= Sing One for the Lord =

Song by Billy Preston

from the album Encouraging Words
- Released: September 11, 1970
- Recorded: February 1969, January 1970
- Genre: Gospel
- Length: 3:49
- Label: Apple
- Songwriter(s): George Harrison, Billy Preston
- Producer(s): George Harrison, Billy Preston

"Sing One for the Lord" is a song by American soul musician Billy Preston that was released in September 1970 on his Apple Records album Encouraging Words. It was written by George Harrison and Preston. Although the pair frequently collaborated as recording artists from 1969 onwards, it is their only formal songwriting collaboration. The song is in the gospel style and was written in praise of the two musicians' respective deities.

"Sing One for the Lord" was one of the first songs that Preston and Harrison worked on together, following Preston's participation in the Beatles' Let It Be sessions in January 1969 and his signing to the band's Apple label. An early mix of the track was made on February 13 that year, but the song was omitted from Preston's 1969 album That's the Way God Planned It. The recording was completed in January 1970 when the Edwin Hawkins Singers overdubbed a gospel chorus at Olympic Sound Studios in London.

== Composition and recording ==
"Sing One for the Lord" is one of several examples of George Harrison collaborating with a songwriter outside the Beatles during the final years of the band's career, alongside his collaborations over 1968–70 with Eric Clapton, Bob Dylan and Doris Troy. While Billy Preston had been brought up in the Southern gospel tradition, gospel music was a new direction for Harrison at the time. When rehearsing with the Beatles at Twickenham Film Studios in early January 1969, Harrison had presented a new composition, "Hear Me Lord", saying it was a gospel song he had just written. Typical of the dysfunctional atmosphere in the group, the latter song received little interest from his bandmates. The film project, which evolved into the Let It Be documentary film, was salvaged by the band relocating to their own Apple Studio on January 22 and by Harrison's invitation to Preston to join the band on keyboards. Having helped to alleviate the disharmony among the band through his presence, Preston was rewarded with an Apple Records recording contract. With Harrison as his producer, Preston began recording for the label in February, and "Sing One for the Lord" was among the first songs they worked on.

Preston said in a 1971 interview, with regard to his and Harrison's respective concepts of "the Lord": "The names change: his is Krishna; mine is Christ. The spiritual promotion praising God, chanting, spreading it, turning people onto it – these are the things we have in common."

The song begins with Preston's piano introduction, playing Edvard Grieg's Piano Concerto in A minor. The main body of the track constitutes a "rolling, lilting evocation of African-American spirituality", according to author Simon Leng, built around Preston's piano, electric piano and Hammond organ, to which Harrison adds descending arpeggios on electric guitar. Apple historian Andy Davis identifies the "shimmering drone" on the recording as an Indian tambura. Davis adds: "The [song's] lyrics are akin to lines of a Sunday sermon, leading up to Billy's exaltation 'God is good! Praise his name.'"

== Release and legacy ==
Apple released Encouraging Words on September 11, 1970 in Britain, five months after the Beatles' break-up, with the US release following on November 9. "Sing One for the Lord" was sequenced as the second track on side two of the LP, between Preston's cover of the Beatles' Let It Be track "I've Got a Feeling" and his own "When You Are Mine". The release followed stringent financial cutbacks at Apple under Allen Klein's management, as the company's press office was shut down in late July. The album received little promotion and failed to achieve commercial success.

Following his work with Preston and Doris Troy, Harrison explored gospel music further with his first post-Beatles solo album, All Things Must Pass, in 1970. Simon Leng describes "Sing One for the Lord" as "the unsung companion piece" to Harrison's first hit as a solo artist, "My Sweet Lord", an early version of which also appeared on Encouraging Words. He says that working with Preston and the Edwin Hawkins Singers was the "catalyst" for Harrison's overt spiritual pronouncements on "Awaiting on You All" to "chant the names of the Lord".

Andy Davis recognizes "Sing One for the Lord" as an "inspirational highlight" on an album that "stands as one of the finest titles in the Apple Records catalogue". In his review for AllMusic, Bruce Eder similarly views Encouraging Words as being among the label's best releases and rues its lack of public recognition at the time. He cites the song as an example of the album's "truly, delightfully strange sound amalgams", in that it "manages to couple soaring gospel with some loud lead guitar and a piano part derived from [Grieg]".

== Personnel ==
- Billy Preston – vocals, piano, electric piano, Hammond organ
- George Harrison – bass guitar, lead guitar
- Ringo Starr – drums
- The Edwin Hawkins Singers – backing vocals
