= Hear Me Lord =

Song by George Harrison

from the album All Things Must Pass
- Released: 27 November 1970
- Genre: Rock, gospel
- Length: 5:46
- Label: Apple
- Songwriter: George Harrison
- Producers: George Harrison, Phil Spector

"Hear Me Lord" is a song by English rock musician George Harrison from his 1970 triple album All Things Must Pass. It was the last track on side four of the original LP format and is generally viewed as the closing song on the album, disc three being the largely instrumental Apple Jam. Harrison wrote "Hear Me Lord" in January 1969 while still a member of the Beatles, who rehearsed it briefly at Twickenham Film Studios that month, but passed it over for inclusion on what became their final album, Let It Be.

The song is in the gospel-rock musical style and the lyrics take the form of a personal prayer, in which Harrison seeks help and forgiveness from his deity. Along with "My Sweet Lord", it is among the most overtly religious selections on All Things Must Pass. The recording was co-produced by Phil Spector and includes musical contributions from Eric Clapton, Gary Wright, Billy Preston, Bobby Whitlock and other musicians from Delaney & Bonnie's Friends band.

On release, Ben Gerson of Rolling Stone described "Hear Me Lord" as the album's "big statement" and a "majestic plea". Harrison included the song in his set list for the Concert for Bangladesh on 1 August 1971. He performed it during the afternoon show only, although the recording has never been issued officially.

== Background and composition ==
George Harrison wrote "Hear Me Lord" over the weekend of 4–5 January 1969, soon after the Beatles had begun the rehearsals for a proposed television special at Twickenham Film Studios. With the band members in disagreement about the nature of the project and whether to return to live performance, this period was one of discord within the group. For Harrison, it contrasted sharply with the two months he had spent in the United States at the end of 1968, when he had enjoyed collaborating with musicians such as Jackie Lomax, members of the Los Angeles Wrecking Crew, Tiny Tim, Bob Dylan and the Band. In addition, his wife, Pattie Boyd, had temporarily left him that same weekend, after discovering that Harrison was having an affair with a French woman they had invited to stay at their home.

Although the song is recognised as a deeply personal statement, "Hear Me Lord" is one of the compositions that Harrison does not mention at all in his 1980 autobiography, I, Me, Mine. Harrison biographer Simon Leng describes the self-revelation evident in its lyrics as "unprecedented", adding: "How many millionaire rock stars use a song to beg forgiveness from God, or anyone else ...?" Leng identifies three "anchors" in the song's lyrics: the phrases "forgive me", "help me" and "hear me".

In their pleas for forgiveness, acknowledgement of weakness and promise of self-improvement, Harrison's words have been described by author Ian Inglis as offering a similar statement to the Christian Lord's Prayer. Inglis highlights the song's final verse – particularly the lines "Help me Lord, please / To burn out this desire" – as being an "almost flagellatory ... self-chastisement" on Harrison's part. Religious academic Joshua Greene recognises the same couplet as an example of Harrison the "life-lover", prone to "sexual fantasies", and just one facet of its parent album's "intimately detailed account of a spiritual journey".

== The Beatles' Get Back sessions ==
On 6 January 1969, the third day of the Beatles' filmed rehearsals at Twickenham, Harrison presented the song to his bandmates, announcing that he had written it over the weekend. Like "Let It Down", "Isn't It a Pity" and other compositions of his around this time, it was met with little enthusiasm from the group's principal songwriters, John Lennon and Paul McCartney. The band barely rehearsed "Hear Me Lord" that day, during which Harrison and McCartney engaged in an on-camera argument culminating in Harrison's resigned comment "Whatever it is that will please you, I'll do it." Even after the location had been moved to the Apple basement later that month and keyboard player Billy Preston brought in – two developments Harrison instigated in an attempt to improve the atmosphere – he would not play the song again at any Beatles session.

Harrison found a more sympathetic collaborator in Preston, a born-again Christian, when he began producing the Texan's debut album on Apple Records in February 1969. The two musicians co-wrote the track "Sing One for the Lord", one of the first songs Preston recorded for Apple, although it would not be released until September 1970, on his Encouraging Words album.

== Recording ==
At Abbey Road Studios on 20 May 1970, a month after the Beatles' break-up, Harrison ran through "Hear Me Lord" alone on electric guitar for producer Phil Spector. Leng suggests that, following Lennon and McCartney's routine dismissal of many of his compositions, Harrison "presented his new songs with reticence, almost with a Pavlovian expectation of their being rejected". In his interview for the 2011 George Harrison: Living in the Material World documentary, Spector explains his positive reaction to Harrison's spiritually themed songs: "He just lived by his deeds. He was spiritual and you knew it, and there was no salesmanship involved. It made you spiritual being around him." (Note: Harrison biographer Gary Tillery notes an additional need for faith on the singer's part in mid 1970 as "pillars of Harrison's old life were passing away", with the demise of his former band and the fatal illness of his mother, Louise.) This solo performance of "Hear Me Lord" was subsequently made available on the bootleg album Beware of ABKCO!

Selected for inclusion on All Things Must Pass, the band performance of "Hear Me Lord" has been described by Leng as "slow-cooking, gospel rock". The musicians on the recording were all those with whom Harrison had briefly toured Europe in December 1969, as a member of Delaney & Bonnie's Friends band, including Preston and Eric Clapton, supplemented by pianist Gary Wright, a mainstay of the extended sessions for All Things Must Pass. The track begins with Jim Gordon's heavily treated drums and features a "rolling" piano commentary from Wright and "sweet slide guitar licks" from Harrison, Leng writes. Author Bruce Spizer remarks on the "soulful" backing-vocal arrangement performed by Harrison, multi-tracked and credited to the George O'Hara-Smith Singers.

The guitar interplay between Harrison and Clapton, notably what Leng terms the track's "'Little Wing' riffs", would be reprised on "Back in My Life Again" and "A Day Without Jesus" for organ player Bobby Whitlock's eponymous solo album, which was recorded in January 1971. In their Solo Beatles Compendium, Chip Madinger and Mark Easter comment that the official take of "Hear Me Lord" ran considerably longer than the released 5:46 running time. On the 2001 reissue of All Things Must Pass, the song's length was extended to 6:01. (Note: Alternate mixes of the track, available on bootleg compilations, reveal that the performance extended to a further 90 seconds than the released version. In one of these mixes, Harrison can be heard directing the musicians when to change to the bridge sections and calling out the ending, which, in music critic Richie Unterberger's description, takes the form of "a cold close with a long, gothic organ chord – one nice touch not heard on the final album".)

== Release and reception ==
"Hear Me Lord" was released on 27 November 1970 as the last track on disc two of All Things Must Pass. It was effectively the final song on the album, since the third LP, titled Apple Jam, was a bonus disc consisting almost entirely of instrumental jams recorded during the sessions. Discussing the impact success of Harrison's triple album, author Nicholas Schaffner wrote in 1977: "George painted his masterpiece at a time when both he and his audience still believed music could change the world. If Lennon's studio was his soap-box, then Harrison's was his pulpit."

The release coincided with a period when the counterculture's interest in spirituality, at the expense of formal religion, received heavy coverage both in the mainstream press and from religious commentators. Reflecting the intentions behind songs such as "Hear Me Lord" and the album's worldwide number 1 hit single, "My Sweet Lord", Harrison said in an interview at the time: "Music should be used for the perception of God, not jitterbugging." He added: "I want to be God-conscious. That's really my only ambition, and everything else in life is incidental." Former Mojo editor Mat Snow includes "Hear Me Lord" among the songs that provided "added vindication" for Harrison, after All Things Must Pass saw him become "by far the most successful" former Beatle by the Christmas of 1970.

In his contemporaneous album review for the NME, Alan Smith described "Hear Me Lord" as an "impassioned hymn" and a "stand-out number within the whole set". To Rolling Stone's Ben Gerson, having bemoaned that "[Harrison's] words sometimes try too hard; [as if] he's taking himself or the subject too seriously", "Hear Me Lord" was "the big statement". "Here George stops preaching," Gerson continued, "and, speaking only to a God, delivers a simple, but majestic plea: 'Help me Lord please / To rise a little higher ...'" Less impressed, Peter Reilly of Stereo Review wrote that, as with "Awaiting on You All", the song demonstrated a "fundamentalist religious strain" that, unlike in Jimmy Webb's work, was not entirely successful, although he deemed it "nonetheless effective".

In The New York Times, Don Heckman called "Hear Me Lord" and "My Sweet Lord" "parallel songs" that conveyed the intensifying of Harrison's spiritual resolve from the Beatles era. In this, as with Harrison's championing of Indian music and authorship of "Something", he recognised Harrison as having been responsible for "major changes in the style and substance of the Beatles" yet still comparatively anonymous within the band's public image, leading Heckman to conclude: "And now, with the break‐up of the Beatles a seeming fact of life, how ironic that it is Harrison who, possibly because of his detachment from the Lennon–McCartney emotional axis, has maintained and even increased his creative momentum."

== Retrospective assessments and legacy ==
Among Beatles and Harrison biographers, Elliot Huntley, Ian Inglis and Robert Rodriguez consider the song to be a perfect album closer, a point to which Chip Madinger and Mark Easter add: "If the Lord hadn't heard him by now, then there wasn't much else [Harrison] could do to get his ear." Huntley praises "Hear Me Lord" as "another soulful hymn ... another number given the full gospel treatment by Spector" and recognises Harrison as "the first white man to combine gospel and rock without sounding ludicrous". Writing in Rolling Stone Press's Harrison tribute in 2002, Greg Kot described the music as "orchestrated into a dense, echo-laden cathedral of rock in excelsis by Phil Spector" before commenting: "But the real stars of this monumental effort are Harrison's songs, which give awe-inspiring dimension to his spirituality and sobering depth to his yearning for a love that doesn't lie." (Note: Having first met Harrison early in the sessions for All Things Must Pass, Gary Wright soon followed him on a path dedicated to Hindu-aligned spirituality. In his autobiography Dream Weaver, Wright says that songs such as "Hear Me Lord" "had spiritual messages, something I had not heard before in pop music – especially to the degree that he used them. He was breaking new ground as an artist to an even greater degree than he had done in the past [with the Beatles].")

Music critic Richie Unterberger describes "Hear Me Lord" as "a lovely, somber number" when first performed by Harrison at Twickenham in January 1969. He adds that the Beatles' disinterest in the song was most likely due to its unsuitability to the band's style, whereas "it truly found its appropriate setting" on All Things Must Pass. In his 2001 album review for The New York Times, Jody Rosen grouped "Hear Me Lord" with "Art of Dying" and "Wah-Wah" as examples of how Spector successfully transformed Harrison's compositions on an "operatic scale". Rosen added: "The symphonic squall of these songs seems less about rock star hubris than Mr. Harrison's straining to express outsized emotions – sorrow, regret, longing, writ very large."

Simon Leng says that the lyrics alone might make "Hear Me Lord" seem "falsely pious" yet he recognises Harrison's sincerity reflected in his performance on the recording, as does Bruce Spizer. Leng adds:

Even more than "My Sweet Lord", the closer to the album proper is the most emotionally compelling piece on an emotionally naked compilation. This is a true outpouring of feeling ... A movingly impassioned vocal completes a picture that is as cathartic as anything on Lennon's Plastic Ono Band album.

Less convinced, Inglis writes that "the impression is of a man cowed, rather than liberated, by his faith." He finds an "uneasy self-righteousness" in Harrison's verse-one lines "Forgive them Lord / Those that feel they can't afford you", and concludes: "The song's gospel-tinged backing matches the evangelical nature of its sentiments, but ['Hear Me Lord'] is a slightly unsettling end to a collection of songs of great power and passion." GQ's George Chesterton says that elsewhere on the album, Harrison addresses his audience in a manner that "betrays a tendency ... to lecture his listeners: you should do this, you shouldn't do that", but as with "All Things Must Pass", the "hymnal lyrics" of "Hear Me Lord" are "heartfelt and vulnerable", adding that "Harrison's enduring strength is his sincerity."

Davy Knowles & Back Door Slam covered the song on their 2009 album Coming Up for Air, produced by Peter Frampton, who was one of several uncredited contributors to All Things Must Pass. In his review of Coming Up for Air, for Blogcritics, Josh Hathaway described the song as a "Harrison classic" and the album's "masterpiece", thanks to Frampton's lead guitar duel with Knowles and Benmont Tench's sympathetic organ playing.

== Live performance ==
"Hear Me Lord" was included in Harrison's proposed setlist for the Concert for Bangladesh when rehearsals got under way at Nola Studios, New York City, in the last week of July 1971. Harrison then performed it during the afternoon show at Madison Square Garden on Sunday, 1 August, immediately following Bob Dylan's surprise set. After what author Alan Clayson describes as a "creaky" performance of the song, a slight reorganisation of the concert program saw it dropped for the second show.

Along with Dylan's "Love Minus Zero/No Limit", "Hear Me Lord" was the only song performed at the Concert for Bangladesh that did not appear on the official live album of the event and in Saul Swimmer's 1972 concert film. Following Harrison's death in November 2001, Chris Carter, an American DJ and a consultant to Capitol Records, spoke of including "Hear Me Lord" on a planned reissue of The Concert for Bangladesh, which was scheduled for release during 2002. Carter added: "there are some technical problems with the recording [of the song] … so that's still up in the air." The reissue took place in October 2005, with "Love Minus Zero/No Limit" included as a bonus track, but without the addition of "Hear Me Lord".

== Personnel ==
According to Simon Leng and Bruce Spizer:

- George Harrison – vocals, electric guitar, slide guitar, backing vocals
- Eric Clapton – electric guitar
- Gary Wright – piano
- Bobby Whitlock – organ
- Billy Preston – keyboards
- Carl Radle – bass
- Jim Gordon – drums
- Jim Price – trumpet, horn arrangement
- Bobby Keys – saxophone
- uncredited – tambourine, shaker

== Sources ==
- Dale C. Allison Jr., The Love There That's Sleeping: The Art and Spirituality of George Harrison, Continuum (New York, NY, 2006; ISBN 978-0-8264-1917-0).
- Keith Badman, The Beatles Diary Volume 2: After the Break-Up 1970–2001, Omnibus Press (London, 2001; ISBN 0-7119-8307-0).
- Harry Castleman & Walter J. Podrazik, All Together Now: The First Complete Beatles Discography 1961–1975, Ballantine Books (New York, NY, 1976; ISBN 0-345-25680-8).
- Alan Clayson, George Harrison, Sanctuary (London, 2003; ISBN 1-86074-489-3).
- The Editors of Rolling Stone, Harrison, Rolling Stone Press/Simon & Schuster (New York, NY, 2002; ISBN 0-7432-3581-9).
- Michael Frontani, "The Solo Years", in Kenneth Womack (ed.), The Cambridge Companion to the Beatles, Cambridge University Press (Cambridge, UK, 2009; ISBN 978-1-139-82806-2), pp. 153–82.
- Joshua M. Greene, Here Comes the Sun: The Spiritual and Musical Journey of George Harrison, John Wiley & Sons (Hoboken, NJ, 2006; ISBN 978-0-470-12780-3).
- Olivia Harrison, George Harrison: Living in the Material World, Abrams (New York, NY, 2011; ISBN 978-1-4197-0220-4).
- Elliot J. Huntley, Mystical One: George Harrison – After the Break-up of the Beatles, Guernica Editions (Toronto, ON, 2006; ISBN 1-55071-197-0).
- Ian Inglis, The Words and Music of George Harrison, Praeger (Santa Barbara, CA, 2010; ISBN 978-0-313-37532-3).
- Simon Leng, While My Guitar Gently Weeps: The Music of George Harrison, Hal Leonard (Milwaukee, WI, 2006; ISBN 1-4234-0609-5).
- Chip Madinger & Mark Easter, Eight Arms to Hold You: The Solo Beatles Compendium, 44.1 Productions (Chesterfield, MO, 2000; ISBN 0-615-11724-4).
- Barry Miles, The Beatles Diary Volume 1: The Beatles Years, Omnibus Press (London, 2001; ISBN 0-7119-8308-9).
- Robert Rodriguez, Fab Four FAQ 2.0: The Beatles' Solo Years 1970–1980, Hal Leonard (Milwaukee, WI, 2010; ISBN 978-0-87930-968-8).
- Nicholas Schaffner, The Beatles Forever, McGraw-Hill (New York, NY, 1978; ISBN 0-07-055087-5).
- Mat Snow, The Beatles Solo: The Illustrated Chronicles of John, Paul, George, and Ringo After The Beatles (Volume 3: George), Race Point Publishing (New York, NY, 2013; ISBN 978-1-937994-26-6).
- Bruce Spizer, The Beatles Solo on Apple Records, 498 Productions (New Orleans, LA, 2005; ISBN 0-9662649-5-9).
- Doug Sulpy & Ray Schweighardt, Get Back: The Unauthorized Chronicle of The Beatles' Let It Be Disaster, St. Martin's Griffin (New York, 1997; ISBN 0-312-19981-3).
- Gary Tillery, Working Class Mystic: A Spiritual Biography of George Harrison, Quest Books (Wheaton, IL, 2011; ISBN 978-0-8356-0900-5).
- Richie Unterberger, The Unreleased Beatles: Music & Film, Backbeat Books (San Francisco, CA, 2006; ISBN 978-0-87930-892-6).
- John C. Winn, That Magic Feeling: The Beatles' Recorded Legacy, Volume Two, 1966–1970, Three Rivers Press (New York, NY, 2009; ISBN 978-0-307-45239-9).
