= Doris Troy (album) =

Studio album by Doris Troy
- Released: 11 September 1970
- Recorded: September 1969–spring 1970
- Studio: Trident and Olympic Sound, London
- Genre: Rock, soul, gospel
- Length: 41:38
- Label: Apple
- Producer: Doris Troy, George Harrison

Singles from Doris Troy
- 1. "Ain't That Cute" Released: 13 February 1970 (UK); 16 March 1970 (US); 2. "Jacob's Ladder" Released: 28 August 1970 (UK); 21 September 1970 (US)

Doris Troy is an album released in 1970 on the Beatles' Apple Records label by American soul singer Doris Troy. It features songs written by Troy and a number of the participants on the sessions, including George Harrison, Stephen Stills, Klaus Voormann and Ringo Starr. Through the extended period of recording, the album became an all-star collaborative effort, typical of many Apple projects during 1968–70, although it was Troy's only album on the Beatles' label. Other guest musicians included Billy Preston, Peter Frampton, Leon Russell, Eric Clapton and members of the Delaney & Bonnie Friends band. Like the Harrison-produced single "Ain't That Cute", Doris Troy failed to chart in Britain or America on release.

The album was reissued in 1992 and 2010 with bonus tracks such as Troy's version of the Beatles' hit song "Get Back".

== Background ==
After having a one-off international hit with her song "Just One Look" in 1963, Doris Troy increasingly looked to Britain for continued success as a solo artist. Her brand of soul music was revered there throughout the 1960s and had produced hits for bands such as the Hollies and the Small Faces. Troy settled in London in 1969 and became a sought-after vocal arranger, most notably contributing the gospel-inflected chorus to the Rolling Stones' song "You Can't Always Get What You Want". In the early summer of 1969, at the invitation of singer Madeline Bell, Troy attended the overdub sessions for Billy Preston's first album on Apple Records, That's the Way God Planned It. On meeting Preston's producer, George Harrison, Troy was surprised to learn that he was a fan of her work, and following the sessions, Harrison offered her a recording contract with Apple.

Having experienced fleeting success on Atlantic Records in America, Troy was more demanding than new label-mates such as Preston, and she in fact signed three contracts with Apple: as an artist, a songwriter, and a producer. She was given her own office at Apple's headquarters, with a piano installed – a provision that encouraged songwriting collaborations with Beatles Harrison and Ringo Starr, and with other visitors to the band's premises at 3 Savile Row.

== Production ==
Some of Troy's material was routined and developed at Harrison's home in Surrey, with input from Preston, whose non-album single "All That I've Got (I'm Gonna Give It to You)" Troy co-wrote during this period. Other songs that Troy would record for her album came about later, in the recording studio, a process that Harrison admitted, in a March 1970 BBC Radio 1 interview, was a "good exercise" after the more regimented approach he was used to with the Beatles. Although he would only receive a production credit for "Ain't That Cute", Harrison co-produced all of Troy's Apple sessions. Other songs recorded for Doris Troy include "Hurry", co-written with "Just One Look" collaborator Greg Carroll and originally recorded years before while Troy was signed to Atlantic; "You Tore Me Up Inside", one of two tracks written with New York guitarist Ray Schinnery; and "I've Got to Be Strong", Troy's rewrite of Apple artist Jackie Lomax's "You've Got to Be Strong".

Sources give the starting date of the Doris Troy sessions variously as June, September October and November 1969. Harrison biographer Simon Leng's claim of early autumn ties in with Harrison's commitments to completing That's the Way God Planned It and the Beatles' Abbey Road; recording for the Troy album continued alongside Harrison's many other projects at the time – including session work on Leon Russell's eponymous solo album and the Plastic Ono Band single "Instant Karma!", producing Preston's Encouraging Words and recordings by Jackie Lomax and Radha Krishna Temple (London), and undertaking a brief tour with Delaney & Bonnie. Through these activities, other associates of Harrison offered to contribute to Troy's album, which, in Leng's words, soon "[mutated] into an all-star affair" with an emphasis on spontaneous collaboration. Peter Frampton recalls turning up at Trident Studios as a 19-year-old for an early session for "Ain't That Cute" in October. In November, just before their European tour, Delaney & Bonnie arrived in London from the United States and immediately participated in Troy's session for the song "So Far", co-written by bassist Klaus Voormann. Stephen Stills was also in London, soon to record his first solo album there, and contributed to a number of tracks, including Troy's R&B rendition of his 1967 Buffalo Springfield composition "Special Care".

Originally intended as a standalone single, "Ain't That Cute", backed with a cover of "Vaya Con Dios", was released in February 1970. It failed to chart in Britain or America, but the A-side was later voted 1970's Soul Record of the Year by readers of Melody Maker. With the Beatles having broken up in April that year, Harrison completed mixing on Troy's album on 7 June, early on in the sessions for his All Things Must Pass triple album.

== Release and reissue ==
Doris Troy was released on 11 September 1970 in the United Kingdom (with Apple catalogue number SAPCOR 13) and 9 November in the United States (as Apple ST 3371). The album cover featured a photo taken by Beatles aide Mal Evans, showing Troy seated at a piano. Harrison and Troy's arrangement of the gospel traditional "Jacob's Ladder" was issued as an advance single, with her "fiery" cover of the Beatles' "Get Back" on the B-side.

Like Billy Preston's concurrently released Encouraging Words, Troy's album suffered from a lack of promotion under Allen Klein's control of Apple Records. Despite receiving good reviews from several music critics, Doris Troy failed to make any commercial impact.

The album was issued on CD in July 1992, with five bonus tracks, including the two 1970 B-sides and Troy's version of "All That I've Got". In August that year, David Nathan wrote in Billboard that due to this reissue and Troy's starring role in the popular musical Mama, I Want to Sing!, her musical career was "enjoying a major revival". Troy helped promote the reissue; she referred to the relevance of some of the song lyrics in the 1990s, with regard to racial tensions within America, and recalled of the project's blending of musical genres and cultures: "Doing that album was a reminder that 'soul' didn't have a color."

In October 2010, Doris Troy was reissued in remastered form, as part of another campaign by Apple to re-release its full catalogue. Also included in the Apple Box Set, this CD added an alternative take of "All That I've Got" as a sixth bonus track. In addition, "Ain't That Cute" appeared on an accompanying two-CD compilation, Come and Get It: The Best of Apple Records. Both this song and "You Tore Me Up Inside" subsequently appeared on Troy's 2011 career retrospective I'll Do Anything: The Doris Troy Anthology.

== Reception ==
Professional ratings
Review scores
Source	Rating
AllMusic	3/5 stars
Billboard	"Vital Reissue"
Blues & Soul	(favourable)
Christgau's Record Guide	B−
Mojo	4/5 stars
Record Collector	3/5 stars
Tom Hull	B+

In his review of Troy's 1972 album The Rainbow Testament, Joe Viglione of AllMusic describes Doris Troy as her "critically acclaimed album on Apple". Beatles author Bruce Spizer views the singer's Apple output as "first rate" and singles out "Ain't That Cute" as "a great gospel-style R&B rocker". Reviewing the 1992 CD, Billboard described the album as an "unjustly neglected gem" and "[a] 14-carat soul nugget", while also praising its "smokingest track, the stormy 'Ain't That Cute'". Record Collector's reviewer wrote that Troy's "self-titled riot of gospel, soul and rock epitomised Apple's fusion of musical cultures".

Also writing for AllMusic, Richie Unterberger finds Troy "in great voice" on the album but bemoans the "pedestrian" quality of much of the material, adding: "[T]he heavy rock/soul arrangements often have an over-beefy, early-'70s super-session feel. It works best when Troy puts the brakes on the hard rock to deliver emotional, slower soul tunes." Simon Leng similarly views some of the tracks' "period heaviness" as regrettable while opining that the "power and panache" of Troy's singing "transcends any rock overkill". Leng identifies "So Far" as the "songwriting highlight" and, with regard to George Harrison's career, "Jacob's Ladder" as the "pivotal" track – "an unlikely companion piece to the 'Hare Krishna Mantra' and a pointer to 'My Sweet Lord'".

David Nathan, an authority on soul music, and a friend of Troy's during (and long after) her brief stint on Apple, regards Doris Troy as "certainly her most personal work", and concludes: "In that sense you could say that it is her best album. It is so reflective of who she was at the time." In his preview of Apple Records' 2010 reissues, for Rolling Stone, David Fricke lists Doris Troy among his top five non-Beatle Apple albums, describing it as "Strong but shy of classic". Sharon Davis of Blues & Soul writes that "from the opening track 'Ain't That Cute' … American born Doris' distinctive R&B vocals settled easily into this pot pourie of musical styles", which "crossed mid tempo, high melody, into rock and red-blooded gospel". Davis rates the album "a must for true soul fans".

Less impressed, Ed Ward of The Austin Chronicle views Harrison's collaborations with Troy and Preston as betraying an "uneasy tension between black American gospel and the attempts of some of the Brits to play backup – the Dixie Flyers they weren't". David Cavanagh of Uncut considers Doris Troy to have been "in many ways a typical Apple LP: some raunchy soul, some heavy friends, and nothing too remarkable".

Writing for the reissues review site The Second Disc, Joe Marchese groups Troy's album with Apple releases by Preston and Lomax, under the term "Harrison's Soulful Trio". Marchese describes Doris Troy as "a rollicking party album" and, with reference to the track "You Give Me Joy Joy", he concludes: "joy – sing[ular]ly or doubly – is assuredly what this album will bring to any classic soul fan."

== Track listing ==
=== Original release ===
Side one

No.	Title	Length
1.	"Ain't That Cute" (George Harrison, Doris Troy)	3:48
2.	"Special Care" (Stephen Stills)	2:54
3.	"Give Me Back My Dynamite" (Harrison, Troy)	4:53
4.	"You Tore Me Up Inside" (Troy, Ray Schinnery)	2:27
5.	"Games People Play" (Joe South)	3:06
6.	"Gonna Get My Baby Back" (Harrison, Richard Starkey, Troy, Stills)	2:17
7.	"I've Got to Be Strong" (Jackie Lomax, Troy)	2:33

Side two

8. "Hurry" (Troy, Greg Carroll) – 3:10
9. "So Far" (Klaus Voormann, Troy) – 4:22
10. "Exactly Like You" (Jimmy McHugh, Dorothy Fields) – 3:08
11. "You Give Me Joy Joy" (Harrison, Starkey, Troy, Stills) – 3:38
12. "Don't Call Me No More" (Troy, Schinnery) – 2:04
13. "Jacob's Ladder" (traditional; arranged Harrison, Troy) – 3:18

=== 1992 reissue ===
Tracks 1–13 as per original release with the following bonus tracks:

14. "All That I've Got (I'm Gonna Give It to You)" (Billy Preston, Troy) – 3:55
15. "Get Back" (John Lennon, Paul McCartney) – 3:06
16. "Dearest Darling" (Troy) – 2:50
17. "What You Will Blues" (Troy) – 4:57
18. "Vaya Con Dios" (Larry Russell, Inez James, Buddy Pepper) – 3:29

=== 2010 remaster ===
Tracks 1–18 as per 1992 reissue with the following bonus tracks:

19. "All That I've Got (I'm Gonna Give It to You)" [alternative version] (Preston, Troy) – 3:21

== Personnel ==
- Doris Troy – lead and backing vocals, piano
- George Harrison – electric guitars
- Billy Preston – organ
- Ringo Starr – drums
- Alan White – drums
- Peter Frampton – lead guitar on "Ain't That Cute"

Additional, unspecified contributions from the following musicians:

- Klaus Voormann
- Stephen Stills
- Eric Clapton (on “Ain’t That Cute”, “Give Me Back My Dynamite”, “I’ve Got To Be Strong”, “You Give Me Joy Joy”, “Don’t Call Me No More”, “Get Back”, "What You Will Blues") wheres eric
- Leon Russell
- Delaney Bramlett
- Bonnie Bramlett
- Bobby Whitlock (on "So Far")
- Jim Gordon (on "So Far")
- Rita Coolidge (on "So Far")
- Art Director John Kosh

== Sources ==
- Keith Badman, The Beatles Diary Volume 2: After the Break-Up 1970–2001, Omnibus Press (London, 2001; ISBN 0-7119-8307-0).
- Harry Castleman & Walter J. Podrazik, All Together Now: The First Complete Beatles Discography 1961–1975, Ballantine Books (New York, NY, 1976; ISBN 0-345-25680-8).
- Alan Clayson, George Harrison, Sanctuary (London, 2003; ISBN 1-86074-489-3).
- Simon Leng, While My Guitar Gently Weeps: The Music of George Harrison, Hal Leonard (Milwaukee, WI, 2006; ISBN 1-4234-0609-5).
- Chip Madinger & Mark Easter, Eight Arms to Hold You: The Solo Beatles Compendium, 44.1 Productions (Chesterfield, MO, 2000; ISBN 0-615-11724-4).
- Barry Miles, The Beatles Diary Volume 1: The Beatles Years, Omnibus Press (London, 2001; ISBN 0-7119-8308-9).
- Chris O'Dell with Katherine Ketcham, Miss O'Dell: My Hard Days and Long Nights with The Beatles, The Stones, Bob Dylan, Eric Clapton, and the Women They Loved, Touchstone (New York, NY, 2009; ISBN 978-1-4165-9093-4).
- Robert Rodriguez, Fab Four FAQ 2.0: The Beatles' Solo Years, 1970–1980, Backbeat Books (Milwaukee, WI, 2010; ISBN 978-1-4165-9093-4).
- Bruce Spizer, The Beatles Solo on Apple Records, 498 Productions (New Orleans, LA, 2005; ISBN 0-9662649-5-9).
