= All That I've Got (I'm Gonna Give It to You) =

- UK picture sleeve

Single by Billy Preston
- B-side: "As I Get Older"
- Released: January 30, 1970
- Genre: Soul rock
- Length: 3:34
- Label: Apple
- Songwriter(s): Billy Preston, Doris Troy
- Producer(s): George Harrison

Billy Preston singles chronology
"Everything's All Right" (1969)	"All That I've Got (I'm Gonna Give It to You)" (1970)	"My Sweet Lord" (1970)

"All That I've Got (I'm Gonna Give It to You)" is a song by American soul musician Billy Preston that was released in January 1970 as his third single on Apple Records. It was written by Preston and his fellow Apple artist Doris Troy and produced by George Harrison. In the United States, the single missed the Billboard Hot 100 chart, peaking at number 108. According to Harrison, the song was Preston's musical response to criticism that he had abandoned his black soul roots by embracing rock music.

Preston and Harrison recorded the track in London in December 1969 with Ringo Starr on drums. The B-side of the single was "As I Get Older", written by Preston and Sly Stone. "All That I've Got" was included as a bonus track on the 1993 and 2010 CD releases of Preston's second Apple album, Encouraging Words. A recording by Troy was first issued in 1992 on the CD release of her album Doris Troy.

== Background and recording ==
George Harrison discussed "All That I've Got (I'm Gonna Give It to You)" and Billy Preston's career on Apple Records in an interview he gave to BBC Radio 1 disc jockey Johnny Moran on March 11, 1970. He said that the song was Preston's attempt to re-engage with his black soul roots after his 1969 hit single "That's the Way God Planned It" had been ignored by soul/R&B radio stations in the United States. Harrison added that Preston had been hurt by criticism from these radio programmers, who said that he was "copping out … going with the whiteys" by embracing rock music.

Preston wrote "All That I've Got" with Doris Troy, another American soul singer who was signed to Apple Records. Preston had intended to record a new single for the label in November 1969 but problems with his work permit for the UK delayed his re-entry into the country. The recording sessions instead began in mid December, in London, after Preston had joined Harrison in Copenhagen as a guest on the Delaney & Bonnie and Friends European tour. Another song, "Right Now", was under consideration for the single but it was kept aside for Preston's forthcoming album, Encouraging Words. Author John Winn describes "All That I've Got" as soul rock, similar to the prevailing style of the album. Aside from Preston on vocals, piano and Hammond organ, the musicians were Harrison on bass guitar and Ringo Starr on drums. A horn section and tambourine also feature on the track.

== Release ==
The single was released on January 30, 1970 in Britain as Apple 21. The US release, with the catalog designation Apple 1817, took place on February 16. The B-side was "As I Get Older", an instrumental written by Preston and Sly Stone. The latter song was produced by Ray Charles, Preston's former mentor and band leader before he began his association with the Beatles in January 1969. As with John Lennon's concurrent Apple single, "Instant Karma!", which also featured Preston and Harrison, the record's face labels included the instruction "PLAY LOUD".

Cash Box's reviewer included the A-side among the magazine's "picks of the week" and wrote: "Preston has been a sideman and studio organist for such people as the Beatles and Ray Charles and now this George Harrison-produced song puts him up front where he obviously belongs. Ties on his heaviest shoes and stomps out the heaviest vocal and instrumental of late." Record World also predicted chart success for the single, saying that "The 'That's the Way God Planned It' organist will do even better this time." As with Preston's previous single, "Everything's All Right", however, "All That I've Got" failed to chart in Britain and was not a commercial success elsewhere. The song spent two weeks on the US Billboard singles chart in March 1970, peaking at number 108. It also missed the Record World Top 100, placing at number 21 on the magazine's Singles Coming Up list.

The song was added as a bonus track to the 1993 CD release of Encouraging Words. It also appeared on the 2010 remastered CD, which was available individually and as part of the multi-artist Apple Records Box Set. A recording of "All That I've Got" by Troy was first issued in 1992, as a bonus track on the CD release of her 1970 Apple album Doris Troy.

== Personnel ==
According to John Winn:

- Billy Preston – vocals, piano, Hammond organ
- George Harrison – bass guitar
- Ringo Starr – drums
- uncredited – horns, tambourine
