= Wah-Wah (song) =

1970 song by George Harrison

- Cover of the original Hansen Publishing sheet music for the song

Song by George Harrison

from the album All Things Must Pass
- Released: 27 November 1970
- Recorded: May 1970
- Studio: EMI (London)
- Genre: Hard rock
- Length: 5:35
- Label: Apple
- Songwriter: George Harrison
- Producers: George Harrison, Phil Spector

"Wah-Wah" is a song by English rock musician George Harrison from his 1970 triple album All Things Must Pass. Harrison wrote the song following his temporary departure from the Beatles in January 1969, during the troubled Get Back sessions that resulted in their Let It Be album and film. The lyrics reflect his frustration with the atmosphere in the group at that time – namely, Paul McCartney's over-assertiveness and criticism of his guitar playing, John Lennon's lack of engagement with the project and dismissal of Harrison as a songwriter, and Yoko Ono's constant involvement in the band's activities. Music critics and biographers recognise the song as Harrison's statement of personal and artistic freedom from the Beatles. Its creation contrasted sharply with his rewarding collaborations outside the group in the months before the Get Back project, particularly with Bob Dylan and the Band in upstate New York.

Recorded shortly after the Beatles' break-up in 1970, "Wah-Wah" was the first track taped for All Things Must Pass. The recording features a dense production treatment from Phil Spector and backing from a large cast of musicians including Eric Clapton, Ringo Starr, Billy Preston, Bobby Keys and the band Badfinger. On release, Rolling Stone magazine described it as "a grand cacophony of sound in which horns sound like guitars and vice versa". While several reviewers find the heavy production appropriate for the song, Harrison considered the recording overproduced and the sound too cluttered.

"Wah-Wah" was the first song Harrison played live as a solo artist when he performed it as his opener for the Western-music portion of the Concert for Bangladesh, in August 1971. Viewed by some commentators as superior to the studio recording, this version re-created Spector's Wall of Sound treatment in a live setting, using many of the participants from the 1970 album sessions. At the Concert for George in November 2002, a year after Harrison's death, "Wah-Wah" was performed by an all-star band that included Clapton, Jeff Lynne, Starr and McCartney. Ocean Colour Scene, Buffalo Tom, Beck and the Tedeschi Trucks Band are among the other artists who have covered the song.

== Background ==
=== October–December 1968 US visit ===
When discussing the song "Wah-Wah" and George Harrison's temporary departure from the Beatles in January 1969, several commentators note the importance of his recent two-month visit to America, which followed the completion of the band's 1968 double album The Beatles, commonly known as the White Album. In Los Angeles, where he was producing a Jackie Lomax solo album for the Beatles' Apple record label, Harrison directed top session players such as Hal Blaine and Larry Knechtel, and met two American musicians with whom he would soon collaborate in London, Delaney Bramlett and Leon Russell. Later in the US trip, Harrison stayed in upstate New York, where he established a musical bond with Bob Dylan and thrived among what author Simon Leng calls the "group ethic and camaraderie" of the Band. Throughout this period, Harrison continued to bloom as a songwriter, having contributed four songs to The Beatles that, in the words of author Nicholas Schaffner, "firmly established him as a contender" beside bandmates John Lennon and Paul McCartney. In addition, he had recently co-written Cream's single "Badge" with Eric Clapton, as well as collaborating with Dylan in Bearsville.

=== January 1969 at Twickenham Film Studios ===
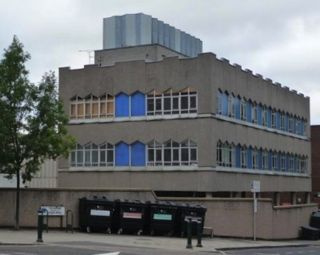
Part of Twickenham Film Studios, in south-west London

Harrison later recalled his two months in the United States as having been "such a good time", yet "the moment I got back with the Beatles [for their Get Back film project], it was just too difficult". These difficulties included having to endure McCartney's habit of dictating how the others should play their instruments and Lennon's increasing withdrawal from the band and emotional dependence on his ever-present partner, Yoko Ono. The couple had recently descended into heroin addiction, leaving Lennon, in author Peter Doggett's words, "emotionally removed and artistically bankrupt". In their study of the Get Back project, Doug Sulpy and Ray Schweighardt write that, as another frustration for Harrison, Lennon and McCartney regularly overlooked his compositions, even when they were "far better than their own". (Note: The previous year, Lennon and McCartney had similarly shown no interest in recording Harrison's "While My Guitar Gently Weeps", a track that author Mark Hertsgaard has described as "perhaps the single most impressive song on the White Album".)

On 6 January 1969, the band's third day at Twickenham Film Studios, in south-west London, an argument was captured on film where McCartney criticised Harrison's guitar playing on the song "Two of Us". A resigned Harrison told him: "I'll play ... whatever you want me to play, or I won't play at all if you don't want me to play. Whatever it is that will please you, I'll do it." With the sessions being recorded by film director Michael Lindsay-Hogg, tapes reveal Beatles associates Neil Aspinall and George Martin sympathising with Harrison's position, recognising that McCartney and Lennon "don't offer him enough freedom within their compositions". Ringo Starr, who had quit the band briefly during the White Album sessions, partly as a result of McCartney's hectoring of his drumming, recalled of Harrison's refusal to be "dominated" by McCartney any longer: "Paul [typically] wanted to point out the solo to George, who would say, 'Look, I'm a guitarist. I'll play the solo.' And he always did, he always played fine solos."

I just got so fed up with the bad vibes – and that arguments with Paul were getting put in the film. I didn't care if it was the Beatles, I was getting out.

— George Harrison to Musician magazine, November 1987

Over the first three days at Twickenham, Harrison had presented new compositions such as "All Things Must Pass", "Let It Down" and "Hear Me Lord" for consideration; these and other "numerous beautiful songs", music journalist Martin O'Gorman writes, "received derision and disinterest from Lennon or heavy-handed interference from McCartney". (Note: Later in January, the Harrison compositions "Something", "Old Brown Shoe" and "Isn't It a Pity" were met with more indifference from Lennon and McCartney.) On 8 January, Harrison debuted "I Me Mine", a song inspired by the bickering and negativity within the band. It was met with ridicule by Lennon and an argument ensued between the two musicians, during which Lennon dismissed Harrison's abilities as a songwriter. According to Sulpy and Schweighardt, Lennon's resentment was most likely a reaction to Harrison's productivity throughout the sessions, since he himself was "unable to write a decent new song". (Note: Music journalist John Harris says that in light of Lennon having offered only a "half-finished" "Don't Let Me Down" and the "pretty execrable" "Dig a Pony", Harrison must have been "enraged ... all the more".) In addition, Harrison had been alone in voicing his objections to Ono's presence, telling the couple how, in Lennon's later recollection, "Dylan and a few people said she's got a lousy name in New York".

Over lunch on Friday, 10 January, a more severe argument took place in which Harrison berated Lennon for contributing nothing positive to the rehearsals. Harrison walked out of the Beatles, saying that the others should advertise in the NME for his replacement. He then drove to his home, Kinfauns, in Surrey, and wrote "Wah-Wah" that same afternoon. Despite the animosity between himself and Lennon on the day he quit the group, Harrison later confirmed a suggestion made by music journalist Timothy White that, just like Lennon's "How Do You Sleep?" and "Crippled Inside", the song was a "swipe" at McCartney.

=== Harrison's return to the Beatles ===
It's a festering wound … It's only this year that [George] has realised who he is. And all the fucking shit we've done to him.

— Lennon to McCartney, discussing Harrison's departure from the Beatles

Harrison's diary records that Lennon and Ono "diverted" him at home over breakfast the following morning, but even after a subsequent band meeting at Starr's house, author Barry Miles writes, their "feud" remained "intractable". At the meeting, much to Harrison's annoyance, Lennon once more chose to have Ono speak on his behalf. Harrison then went to his parents' home in Warrington for a few days before imposing terms for his return to the band – namely, that McCartney's plans for a live concert be abandoned and the project be relocated to the Beatles' own Apple Studio, at London's Savile Row. Commentators have remarked on a change in Harrison's standing within the band as a result of his walkout, and later in 1969, Lennon and McCartney would be speaking admiringly of Harrison's growth as a songwriter. (Note: McCartney told Lennon: "Until this year, our songs have been better than George's. Now this year his songs are at least as good as ours ..." Lennon named Harrison's "Something" as his favourite track on the Beatles' Abbey Road album, released in September 1969.) In an article for Mojo magazine's July 2001 "Solo Beatles Special", John Harris wrote that although Harrison "nominally" remained a Beatle, he was "serving out his notice" after 10 January 1969.

== Composition ==
In his autobiography, I, Me, Mine, Harrison explains that the song title was a reference to "a 'headache' as well as a footpedal", the wah-wah pedal being a guitar effect that he favoured for much of the early Get Back sessions. The message of the song, according to Harrison, was: "you're giving me a bloody headache." Leng identifies "Wah-Wah" as being directed at the "artifice" and "pretense" surrounding the Beatles.

There was too much restriction [in the Beatles]. It had to self-destruct … I could see a much better time ahead being by myself, away from the band … It was like a straitjacket.

— George Harrison, 2000

The song is based around an electric guitar riff that Leng describes as "snarling". Written in the key of E, the tune incorporates chord changes that musicologist Wilfrid Mellers once admired as "audacious"; musically, Harrison biographer Elliot Huntley suggests, the composition mirrors the "intense atmosphere" at Twickenham in January 1969. Referring to the released recording, author Ian Inglis views "Wah-Wah" as a hard rock song where the "forceful rhythm" conveys "the momentum of [Harrison's] anger".

Like "Run of the Mill", which Harrison also wrote in early 1969, the lyrics touch on the failure of friendships within the band, which in the case of Harrison, McCartney and Lennon dated back to school years. Harrison later spoke of their familiarity with one another resulting in McCartney, especially, failing to recognise his artistic growth; in I, Me, Mine, he refers to "Wah-Wah" as reflecting "that concept of how everybody sees and treats everybody else, allowing no consideration for the fact that we are changing all the time".

The second verse reflects Harrison's frustration at being viewed by Lennon and McCartney as subservient to their ambitions, just as his 1968 composition "Not Guilty" had found Harrison defending himself for supposedly leading his fellow Beatles "astray" to the Maharishi's meditation retreat in India. In "Wah-Wah", he states sarcastically:

You've made me such a big star
Being there at the right time
Cheaper than a dime ...

Over the song's two middle eights, Harrison laments that his bandmates never take the time to notice his sorrow or "hear me sighing".

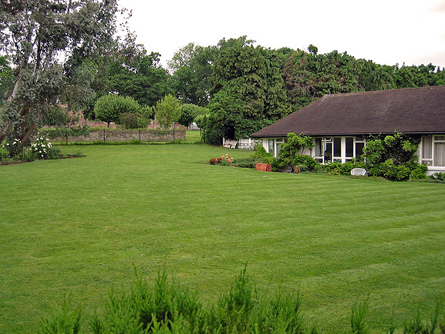
Harrison's Surrey home, Kinfauns, where he wrote "Wah-Wah" immediately after leaving the Beatles

Religious academic Joshua Greene has written of Harrison being "too sure of his life's higher purpose" by January 1969, through his dedication to Hindu spirituality, to continue devoting time to the group's "petty squabbles". In the song's final verse, Harrison provides what AllMusic critic Bill Janovitz terms a "simple, spiritual sentiment", which serves as a statement of his independence from the Beatles:

Now I don't need no wah-wah
And I know how sweet life can be
If I keep myself free …

"Wah-Wah" was never offered to the Beatles once Harrison joined the proceedings at Apple Studio. The choice of Harrison songs that would end up on the Let It Be album in May 1970 – "I Me Mine" and "For You Blue" – has led some authors to speculate that he deliberately withdrew his higher-quality compositions rather than risk having them played without the attention they deserved. Leng lists "Wah-Wah" among a number of solo Beatles songs that are "self-referential" in their lyrical theme and serve as episodes in what he calls "the Beatles soap opera". (Note: Doggett similarly recognises the self-referential nature of Harrison songs such as "Wah-Wah", "Run of the Mill" and "Isn't It a Pity", all of which offered Beatles fans "a teasing glimpse into an intimate world that had previously been off-limits to the public". Later examples include Lennon's "God" and Harrison's "Sue Me, Sue You Blues", and various tracks on McCartney's Ram album and Lennon's Imagine, most notably "Too Many People" and "How Do You Sleep?") Harrison's bitterness at the restrictions imposed on him during the Beatles years resurfaced explicitly in "Who Can See It", a song written in 1972.

== Recording ==
External videos
- "Wah-Wah (Day 2 Demo/Take 1))"
- "Wah-Wah (Session Outtakes and Jams/Take 1)"

=== Demo ===
McCartney's refusal to have the release of his eponymous first solo album delayed until after Let It Be led to him announcing his departure from the band on 9 April 1970, and to Harrison finally deciding to make an album of his many unused songs from the Beatles' later years. He subsequently described the process of recording his songs with outside musicians as "a breath of fresh air". Shortly before starting work on the album, Harrison gave a radio interview to Village Voice reporter Howard Smith, and explained that, although he had some ideological differences with Lennon, his objection to any possible Beatles reunion was based solely on his musical differences with McCartney. (Note: This situation would remain unchanged during a period in the mid 1970s when the other Beatles all began intimating that they would not be opposed to playing together again. Harrison's aversion to working with McCartney was still apparent before and after the band's Anthology project two decades later.)

In the same 1970 radio interview, Harrison announced that he would be co-producing the album with Phil Spector, whose work on the Let It Be album had recently enraged McCartney. On 27 May, having returned to London, Harrison recorded demos of songs intended for his solo album, All Things Must Pass, partly for Spector's benefit. He performed "Wah-Wah" on electric guitar, accompanied by an unnamed bass guitarist. The recording subsequently became available on the Beware of ABKCO! bootleg album. It was formally released in 2021 on the Day 2 Demos disc included in some editions of the 50th anniversary reissue of All Things Must Pass.

=== Basic track ===
Principal recording for the album took place at EMI Studios (now Abbey Road Studios) in London. "Wah-Wah" was the first song recorded for the album. Phil McDonald was the recording engineer for the basic track, which was taped on 28 May, the first day of formal recording for All Things Must Pass.

When we recorded Wah-Wah, the sound in your headphones was reasonably dry, but in the control room to hear the playback, the sound was loud and incredible. I loved it but George didn't: "What are you doing to my song?"

— Klaus Voormann to Mojo magazine, November 2014

In keeping with Spector's signature production style, a large group of musicians took part in the sessions. The line-up has been hard to ascertain due to conflicting recollections and the informal approach of the project. According to Leng and author Bruce Spizer, the musicians on the track included Harrison and Eric Clapton on electric guitars, three members of Badfinger on acoustic rhythm guitars, Billy Preston and Gary Wright on keyboards, bassist Klaus Voormann, Starr on drums, and Badfinger's Mike Gibbins playing tambourine. Wright's first Harrison session was for "Isn't It a Pity", however, which took place on 2 June. Keyboardist Gary Brooker recalled playing on the song and on "My Sweet Lord", the basic track for which they taped later in the 28 May session. While Leng consulted Voormann, Badfinger's Joey Molland and orchestral arranger John Barham for his chapter discussing the recording of All Things Must Pass, Bobby Whitlock, a former sideman with Delaney & Bonnie, has stated that he played electric piano on "Wah-Wah". Whitlock recalls that, having arrived at the session late due to traffic, and finding that the other musicians were all playing on the downbeat on the song, he was left to play alone in the obvious "open spot" – on the upbeat. The former Delaney & Bonnie horn section of Jim Price and Bobby Keys also contributed to "Wah-Wah, although they were not present at the first session.

Speaking in 2000 about the session for "Wah-Wah", Harrison said that the music sounded "really nice" in the room, "with all these nice acoustics and piano, and no echo on anything", but he was shocked during the playback when he heard the sound treatment Spector had given the track. In Leng's words, Spector "[unleashed] his full armory of reverb-flooded production values" on the song. (Note: Whitlock writes of entering the studio and hearing Spector calling out a series of instructions to the engineers: "'Phase the drums,' 'Phase the piano,' followed by 'Phase everything!'") Harrison dismissed the result as "horrible", and recalled that when Clapton said he liked the way it sounded, he replied, "Well, you can have it on your album, then." Although Harrison said "I grew to like it", he subsequently reverted to his original opinion that the song, like much of All Things Must Pass, was overproduced.

=== Overdubbing ===
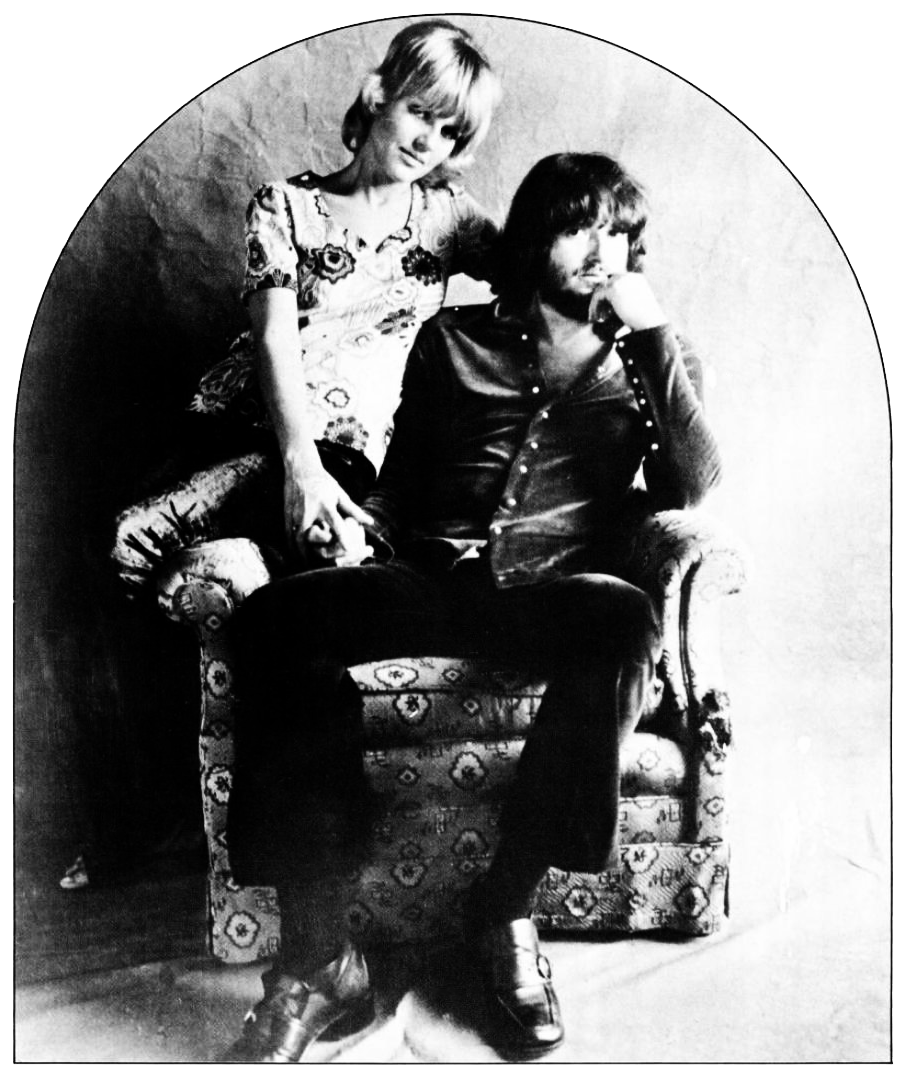
Delaney and Bonnie Bramlett, whose soul revue influenced the sound on "Wah-Wah", after Harrison had toured with them in December 1969

Take 3 of "Wah-Wah" was selected for overdubs. (Note: The Sessions Outtakes and Jams disc of the expanded 50th anniversary reissue of All Things Must Pass includes take 1 of the song.) Overdubbing on many of the album's basic tracks was carried out at EMI and Trident Studios, often without Spector's assistance, from late July onwards. After receiving Harrison's initial mixes, in August, Spector wrote back with suggestions for each song. Harrison later recalled "Wah-Wah" as being one of the "big noise" tracks that benefited from Trident's 16-track equipment, which allowed for more overdubbing opportunities relative to EMI's 8-track facility. The song includes slide guitars, a technique that Harrison adopted for his solos after he had joined Clapton on Delaney & Bonnie's European tour in December 1969. Harrison also sang all the vocal parts on the track, for which he credited himself as "the George O'Hara-Smith Singers" on the album sleeve.

The completed recording begins with Harrison's guitar riff, which is then joined by Clapton's guitar, played through a wah-wah pedal. Leng suggests that the musical arrangement was influenced by the Delaney & Bonnie song "Comin' Home". "Wah-Wah" also features prominent percussion, including uncredited maracas and congas, and, in Leng's description, a "rollicking horn chart" from Price that helps define the middle-eight sections. Adding to the musical tension, Janovitz writes, Harrison sings high in his range throughout, "almost drowned out" by Spector's Wall of Sound, which sees keyboards, horns and the many guitar parts competing for space in the mix. The song fades out on the single-chord main riff, accompanied by the sound of a car engine changing gear.

== Release ==
Apple Records issued All Things Must Pass on 27 November 1970 with "Wah-Wah" sequenced as the third track, between "My Sweet Lord" and "Isn't It a Pity". Despite its unusually high retail price, as one of rock music's first studio triple LP sets, the album was a significant commercial success worldwide, and comfortably outperformed Lennon and McCartney's respective solo releases over 1970–71. Music journalist Anthony DeCurtis later wrote of the album representing "[the] bracing air of creative liberation" for Harrison.

Like "Isn't It a Pity", the song "All Things Must Pass", and Barry Feinstein's cover photo of Harrison surrounded by four comical-looking garden gnomes, "Wah-Wah" served as a comment by Harrison on his Beatle past. In February 1971, he, Lennon and Starr united in London's High Court of Justice to challenge McCartney's suit to dissolve the band's legal partnership; all three submitted affidavits that mentioned their difficult experiences of working with him. (Note: McCartney was especially keen to cut his ties with Apple Records and manager Allen Klein. As an indication of the acrimony between him and his former bandmates, McCartney recalled a telephone conversion in December 1970 in which Harrison told him: "You'll stay on the fucking label – Hare Krishna!") In the context of this post-breakup unity, "Wah-Wah" was widely assumed to be directed at McCartney only, just as Harrison's walkout two years before was thought to have been due solely to McCartney.

== Critical reception and legacy ==
In his book on the Beatles' first decade as solo artists, Robert Rodriguez includes "Wah-Wah" among the "essential components" of All Things Must Pass, and he recalls the "buzz" surrounding the release as having been "about a major talent unleashed, one who'd [previously] been hidden in plain sight" behind Lennon and McCartney. In a contemporary review for Rolling Stone, Ben Gerson suggested that the album was the rock-music equivalent of Tolstoy's epic novel War and Peace, while describing "Wah-Wah" as a "vintage Beatle song" and "a grand cacophony of sound in which horns sound like guitars and vice versa". In The New York Times, Don Heckman commented on the irony that it was Harrison "who, possibly because of his detachment from the Lennon–McCartney emotional axis, has maintained and even increased his creative momentum". He found "the spirit of the Beatles" present throughout the album, adding: "A piece like 'Wah‐Wah' calls up visions of the early days, when the quartet played live music, surrounded by enormous crowds of weeping and wailing teeny‐boppers." By contrast, Alan Smith of the NME found the dense sound oppressive and regarded the song as "inconsequential ... one of the weaker tracks, although it's not short on dressing".

AllMusic's Bill Janovitz sums up the track as "a glorious rocker ... [that's] as edgy as anything Harrison ever sang while in the Beatles, if not more so", and "a driving, majestic song on the edge of being out of control". John Bergstrom of PopMatters says that the best moments on All Things Must Pass "involve Harrison addressing his former band"; of these, the "raucous, killer jam" of "Wah-Wah" dismisses the Beatles' strife-filled final years as "so much white noise". While the song is "cutting", Bergstrom continues, "the sense of liberation is almost palpable." Jayson Greene of Pitchfork describes "Wah-Wah" as "layered with so many different guitar tracks it feels like three guitar rock songs fighting each other", and "possibly Harrison’s most pointed missive as a solo artist". Greene hears the message as "more bemused than pissed-off", citing the "swoop and dip" of the melody and a central riff that together convey "chuckling rather than shouting". GQ's George Chesterton says the song "manages to be exciting and funny at the same time" and describes it as "a quasi-religious nursery rhyme about a guitar effects pedal and not being fully appreciated by Lennon and McCartney".

In a 2001 review for the Chicago Tribune, Greg Kot said that following "My Sweet Lord"'s role as an entrance to Spector's "cathedral of sound", "['Wah-Wah'] reaches sonic overload; three tunes into the album, Harrison is already storming heaven's gate." Kot added: "'Wah Wah' is the guitarist's version of heavy metal, a thunderous ascent that keeps adding instruments until it's almost impossible to imagine anyone even breathing in the saturated-till-bursting mix, a triumphant wail that collapses into the exhausted arms of 'Isn't It a Pity' ..." Writing for Rough Guides, Chris Ingham considers that without Spector's Wall of Sound excesses, All Things Must Pass "wouldn't be the magnificently overblown item that it is", and he writes of "the sheer size of the sound … threatening to trample both song and singer" in the case of "the thunderous Wah-Wah". Writing for Q magazine in 2002, John Harris said that All Things Must Pass was "by some distance, the best Beatles solo album" and the "widescreen sound" used by Harrison and Spector on tracks such as "Wah-Wah" had since been "echoed in the work of such Beatles fans as ELO and Oasis". Former Mojo editor Paul Du Noyer describes the album as "Harrison's handful of earth upon the Beatle coffin", but, less impressed with the composition, he cites "Wah-Wah" as a rare example where "the material is probably too slight to carry the colossal weight of Spector's production".

Among Harrison biographers, Simon Leng writes that the song "trashes the roseate memory of the Beatles". He concludes his discussion of this "unusually heavy chunk of rock" by saying: "It's a song of anger and alienation, redolent of betrayal and hostility. To that extent, it's a good-time number to rival Delaney & Bonnie, with a heart of pure stone." Commenting on the production's "layer upon layer of sonic bombast", Elliot Huntley states that "Spector fans must have been in seventh heaven" when they first heard "Wah-Wah". Huntley refers to it as "one of the outstanding tracks" of Harrison's career, and a welcome though rare "flat-out, kick-ass rocker" in the singer's canon.

Still dissatisfied with Spector's "Cinemascope"-like production on "Wah-Wah", when All Things Must Pass was reissued in January 2001, Harrison admitted that he had been tempted to remix many of the tracks rather than simply remaster the album's original mixes. In an interview with Guitar World magazine to promote the reissue, he also revealed that McCartney had "long since" apologised for his behaviour towards him during the Beatles years. In the 2000 book The Beatles Anthology, Harrison comments: "It's important to state that a lot of water has gone under the bridge ... But talking about what was happening at that time [with McCartney, Lennon and Ono], you can see it was strange."

== Live version ==
On 1 August 1971, Harrison performed "Wah-Wah" as the opening song for the rock-music portion of the two Concert for Bangladesh shows, held at Madison Square Garden in New York. It was therefore the first song he ever played live as a solo artist and, given the humanitarian cause behind the event, Alan Clayson writes, the New York audience "loved him ... before he'd even plucked a string". The running order of the Concert for Bangladesh live album follows the setlist for the second show that day, about which Joshua Greene remarks on the "logical chronology" in Harrison's three-song opening segment: "Wah-Wah" "declared his independence from the Beatles, followed by 'My Sweet Lord,' which declared his internal discovery of God and spirit, and then 'Awaiting on You All,' which projected his message to the world." Since most listeners typically ignored Ravi Shankar's Indian classical set on side one of the triple LP, "Wah-Wah" effectively served as the album's opening track for rock fans. Re-creating the Wall of Sound from All Things Must Pass, Harrison was backed by a large band that again included Clapton, Starr, Preston, Voormann and Badfinger, together with musicians such as Leon Russell, saxophonist Jim Horn and drummer Jim Keltner, and a group of seven backing singers. (Note: In his 2005 album review for Rolling Stone, Anthony DeCurtis commented on Harrison's predicament, having never before led a band in concert: "When you hear the opening roar of 'Wah-Wah', you know that not one of the many musicians onstage was willing to let him fail.")

The recording of "Wah-Wah" that appears on the live album was a composite of the audio from both the afternoon and evening shows. It was therefore one of the few examples of studio manipulation on an otherwise faithful record of the concert. Due to technical problems with the film footage, the "Wah-Wah" segment in Saul Swimmer's concert documentary was created through a series of edits and cuts between visuals from the first and second shows.

Harrison's staging of the two benefit concerts enhanced his standing as the most popular of the former Beatles; Doggett describes him as having become "arguably music's most influential figure" over this period. In a laudatory review of the Concert for Bangladesh album, for Rolling Stone, Jon Landau described "Wah-Wah" as "a simple statement by a musician who knows who he is and what he wants to play". Like Rodriguez, who considers that the song "truly [came] into its own" that day, Andrew Grant Jackson views this live reading as superior to the studio recording. He writes: "The live version is a notch slower, and the cleaner mix allows breathing room to hear the space between the instruments. And more importantly, there's the euphoria of the performance itself." (Note: George Chesterton similarly writes that "stripped of the wall of sound reverb", the live version has "an even greater impact" than the All Things Must Pass track.)

== Cover versions ==
On 29 November 2002, exactly a year after his death from cancer, "Wah-Wah" was the last Harrison composition performed at the Concert for George, held at London's Royal Albert Hall. Jeff Lynne, Eric Clapton and Andy Fairweather-Low shared lead vocals on the song. The band also featured Harrison's son Dhani and many other close musical friends – Starr, Voormann, Keltner, Horn, Brooker, Ray Cooper and Tom Petty among them – as well as Paul McCartney. This performance was released on the album of the concert; although left off the theatrical release of David Leland's Concert for George documentary film, it was subsequently included on the DVD release.

The alternative band B.A.L.L. covered "Wah-Wah" on their 1988 album Bird, as part of their parody of early 1970s rock stars such as the former Beatles. Buffalo Tom recorded "Wah-Wah" live on WMBR in Cambridge, Massachusetts in January 1991, a version that appeared on the band's Fortune Teller EP later that year. Ocean Colour Scene covered the song on their 2005 album A Hyperactive Workout for the Flying Squad, and in 2011 former Jefferson Starship vocalist Mickey Thomas released a version on his album Marauder.

The Tedeschi Trucks Band have often included "Wah-Wah" in their live performances. Beck performed the song on the US television show Conan in September 2014, as part of a week-long promotion for Harrison's The Apple Years box set. Nick Valensi of the Strokes covered it at the George Fest tribute concert that same month, with Matt Sorum, of Guns N' Roses and Velvet Revolver. The Scottish folk-rock band Trembling Bells released a cover of "Wah-Wah" as a single for Record Store Day 2015.

== Personnel ==
According to Simon Leng (except where noted), the following musicians played on "Wah-Wah". Leng states that his keyboard credits for All Things Must Pass are "more indicative than authoritative".

- George Harrison – vocals, electric guitar, slide guitar, backing vocals
- Eric Clapton – electric guitar
- Billy Preston – piano
- Bobby Whitlock – electric piano (Note: Leng lists Gary Wright on electric piano. However, Wright's first session for Harrison was on 2 June, five days after the recording of "Wah-Wah".)
- Gary Brooker – Hammond organ
- Pete Ham – acoustic guitar
- Tom Evans – acoustic guitar
- Joey Molland – acoustic guitar
- Klaus Voormann – bass
- Ringo Starr – drums
- Bobby Keys – saxophones
- Jim Price – trumpet, horn arrangement
- Mike Gibbins – tambourine
- Phil Collins – maracas, congas

== Sources ==
- Keith Badman, The Beatles Diary Volume 2: After the Break-Up 1970–2001, Omnibus Press (London, 2001; ISBN 0-7119-8307-0).
- The Beatles, The Beatles Anthology, Chronicle Books (San Francisco, CA, 2000; ISBN 0-8118-2684-8).
- Harry Castleman & Walter J. Podrazik, All Together Now: The First Complete Beatles Discography 1961–1975, Ballantine Books (New York, NY, 1976; ISBN 0-345-25680-8).
- Alan Clayson, George Harrison, Sanctuary (London, 2003; ISBN 1-86074-489-3).
- Peter Doggett, You Never Give Me Your Money: The Beatles After the Breakup, It Books (New York, NY, 2011; ISBN 978-0-06-177418-8).
- The Editors of Rolling Stone, Harrison, Rolling Stone Press/Simon & Schuster (New York, NY, 2002; ISBN 0-7432-3581-9).
- Anthony Fawcett, John Lennon: One Day at a Time, New English Library (London, 1977; ISBN 978-0-450-03073-4).
- Don Fleming & Richard Radford, Archival Notes – the Making of All Things Must Pass, Capitol Records/Calderstone Productions (Los Angeles, CA/London, 2021).
- George Harrison: Living in the Material World DVD, Village Roadshow, 2011 (directed by Martin Scorsese; produced by Olivia Harrison, Nigel Sinclair & Martin Scorsese).
- Joshua M. Greene, Here Comes the Sun: The Spiritual and Musical Journey of George Harrison, John Wiley & Sons (Hoboken, NJ, 2006; ISBN 978-0-470-12780-3).
- John Harris, "A Quiet Storm", Mojo, July 2001, pp. 66–74.
- George Harrison, I Me Mine, Chronicle Books (San Francisco, CA, 2002; ISBN 0-8118-3793-9).
- Olivia Harrison, George Harrison: Living in the Material World, Abrams (New York, NY, 2011; ISBN 978-1-4197-0220-4).
- Mark Hertsgaard, A Day in the Life: The Music and Artistry of the Beatles, Pan Books (London, 1996; ISBN 0-330-33891-9).
- Elliot J. Huntley, Mystical One: George Harrison – After the Break-up of the Beatles, Guernica Editions (Toronto, ON, 2006; ISBN 1-55071-197-0).
- Chris Ingham, The Rough Guide to the Beatles, Rough Guides/Penguin (London, 2006; 2nd edn; ISBN 978-1-8483-6525-4).
- Ian Inglis, The Words and Music of George Harrison, Praeger (Santa Barbara, CA, 2010; ISBN 978-0-313-37532-3).
- Andrew Grant Jackson, Still the Greatest: The Essential Solo Beatles Songs, Scarecrow Press (Lanham, MD, 2012; ISBN 978-0-8108-8222-5).
- Simon Leng, While My Guitar Gently Weeps: The Music of George Harrison, Hal Leonard (Milwaukee, WI, 2006; ISBN 1-4234-0609-5).
- Ian MacDonald, Revolution in the Head: The Beatles' Records and the Sixties, Pimlico (London, 1998; ISBN 0-7126-6697-4).
- Thomas MacFarlane, The Music of George Harrison, Routledge (Abingdon, UK, 2019; ISBN 978-1-138-59910-9).
- Chip Madinger & Mark Easter, Eight Arms to Hold You: The Solo Beatles Compendium, 44.1 Productions (Chesterfield, MO, 2000; ISBN 0-615-11724-4).
- Wilfrid Mellers, The Music of the Beatles: Twilight of the Gods, Schirmer Books (New York, NY, 1973; ISBN 0-670-73598-1).
- Barry Miles, The Beatles Diary Volume 1: The Beatles Years, Omnibus Press (London, 2001; ISBN 0-7119-8308-9).
- Mojo Special Limited Edition: 1000 Days of Revolution (The Beatles' Final Years – Jan 1, 1968 to Sept 27, 1970), Emap (London, 2003).
- Chris O'Dell (with Katherine Ketcham), Miss O'Dell: My Hard Days and Long Nights with The Beatles, The Stones, Bob Dylan, Eric Clapton, and the Women They Loved, Touchstone (New York, NY, 2009; ISBN 978-1-4165-9093-4).
- Robert Rodriguez, Fab Four FAQ 2.0: The Beatles' Solo Years, 1970–1980, Backbeat Books (Milwaukee, WI, 2010; ISBN 978-1-4165-9093-4).
- Nicholas Schaffner, The Beatles Forever, McGraw-Hill (New York, NY, 1978; ISBN 0-07-055087-5).
- Bruce Spizer, The Beatles Solo on Apple Records, 498 Productions (New Orleans, LA, 2005; ISBN 0-9662649-5-9).
- Doug Sulpy & Ray Schweighardt, Get Back: The Unauthorized Chronicle of The Beatles' Let It Be Disaster, St. Martin's Griffin (New York, 1997; ISBN 0-312-19981-3).
- Bobby Whitlock (with Marc Roberty), Bobby Whitlock: A Rock 'n' Roll Autobiography, McFarland (Jefferson, NC, 2010; ISBN 978-0-7864-6190-5).
- John C. Winn, That Magic Feeling: The Beatles' Recorded Legacy, Volume Two, 1966–1970, Three Rivers Press (New York, NY, 2009; ISBN 978-0-3074-5239-9).
