= Encouraging Words =

Studio album by Billy Preston
- Released: September 11, 1970
- Recorded: February 1969, December 1969−April 1970
- Studio: Trident Studios, London; Olympic Sound Studios, London
- Genre: Soul; rock; gospel
- Length: 44.29
- Label: Apple
- Producer: George Harrison, Billy Preston

Billy Preston chronology
| That's the Way God Planned It (1969) | Encouraging Words (1970) | I Wrote a Simple Song (1971) |

Singles from Encouraging Words
- 1. "My Sweet Lord" Released: December 3, 1970 (US)

Encouraging Words is the fifth studio album by American soul musician Billy Preston, released in September 1970 on Apple Records. It was the last of Preston's two albums for the Beatles' Apple label, after which he moved to A&M Records. The album was co-produced by George Harrison and Preston. Harrison's songs "All Things Must Pass" and "My Sweet Lord" were issued here for the first time, two months before his own recordings appeared on his triple album All Things Must Pass.

Released as a single, Preston's "My Sweet Lord" peaked at number 90 on the US Billboard Hot 100 chart in February 1971 but the album failed to chart in Britain or America. Despite its lack of commercial success, Encouraging Words is considered by some commentators to be among the best Apple albums released by an artist other than the Beatles or one of the band members. The album was reissued in 1993 and 2010 with Preston's non-album single "All That I've Got (I'm Gonna Give It to You)" among the bonus tracks.

== Background and songs ==
As on the previous year's That's the Way God Planned It, Billy Preston worked closely with George Harrison on the album. With the Beatles' career essentially over, after John Lennon had privately announced his departure from the band in September 1969, Harrison dedicated himself to projects by his Apple signings such as Preston, Doris Troy and devotees from the London Radha Krishna Temple. On Encouraging Words, he co-produced with Preston and contributed as a musician, backing vocalist and songwriter.

Typical of Preston's approach to developing his songs over time, some of the album's tracks were first recorded during the sessions for That's the Way God Planned It. "Let the Music Play" and "Use What You Got" dated from his time on Capitol Records, the label to which he was signed until, shortly after Preston played on the Beatles' Let It Be sessions in January 1969, Harrison organized for his transferral to the Beatles' Apple label. "You've Been Acting Strange", written by Ronnie Lee Williams, was a song that Preston rehearsed with the Beatles during the same sessions. Encouraging Words also contains "I've Got a Feeling", a Lennon–McCartney song from Let It Be, which remained unreleased until May 1970. Harrison let Preston record his composition "All Things Must Pass", which the Beatles had also rehearsed in January 1969. "Sing One for the Lord", written by Harrison and Preston, was one of the first recordings the pair made together, in February 1969. In a 1971 interview, Preston said of their respective cross-denominational approach: "The names change: his is Krishna; mine is Christ. The spiritual promotion praising God, chanting, spreading it, turning people onto it – these are the things we have in common."

Harrison also let Preston record "My Sweet Lord", the writing for which began, with input from Preston, when they were in Copenhagen in December 1969 during Delaney & Bonnie and Friends' European tour. Originally titled "Drop Out", the song "Encouraging Words" contains lyrics in which Preston urges: "Be kind, be cool, and be careful / Have hope, keep the faith, baby, and be grateful." In the same 1971 interview, Preston said: "My message is to change the image of most entertainers as 'stars', singing lollipop shit. I want to give people something that they'll really remember, to help their lives ... and what I'm talking about is God – a good, solid message that makes you think." The majority of the songs were written by Preston alone, with occasional input from gospel singers Jesse Kirkland and Joe Greene.

== Recording ==
Following the completion of That's the Way God Planned It in July 1969, Harrison and Preston were due to begin work on further recordings in November, starting with a new single. When Preston's return to Britain was delayed by problems in obtaining a work permit, Harrison used the available time to join his friend Eric Clapton on the Delaney & Bonnie tour. The sessions with Preston instead began in London in mid to late December.

Encouraging Words retained some of the all-star personnel from its predecessor − again featuring Clapton as well as Harrison on guitar − augmented by the likes of Ringo Starr, Klaus Voormann and various members of Delaney & Bonnie's band. Studio records state that Clapton played guitar on "Encouraging Words", along with Delaney Bramlett; on "Right Now", recorded in December 1969, and chosen to open the album; and "Use What You Got", which Harrison decided to remake rather than use the version that Preston had recorded for Capitol in 1968. In the same way, a new version of "Let the Music Play" was taped, at Olympic Studios in January 1970.

Other contributors to the sessions included members of the Temptations' and Sam and Dave's backing bands, since both of these American soul acts happened to be touring in the UK at the time. When the Edwin Hawkins Singers arrived in London in January, they too recorded with Preston, adding gospel vocals to "My Sweet Lord" and "Sing One for the Lord". According to author Simon Leng, the album represents a more sympathetic setting for Preston's music than had been the case on That's the Way God Planned It, and is a more successful blend of soul and rock.

In late April 1970, Harrison arrived in New York, where he was said to be working on Preston's album. It is possible that orchestral strings were overdubbed onto "All Things Must Pass" and "Little Girl" at this point, after which Harrison collaborated briefly with Bob Dylan. Mixing was completed on Encouraging Words by May. That same month, with Preston as one of the many backing musicians, Harrison began recording his All Things Must Pass triple album, which included his versions of "My Sweet Lord" and "All Things Must Pass".

== Release and reception ==
Professional ratings
Review scores
| Source | Rating |
|---|---|
| AllMusic | 4.5/5 stars |
| Tom Hull | B |
| Mojo | 3/5 stars |
| MusicHound Rock | 3/5 stars |

Encouraging Words was released in Britain on September 11, 1970 (with the Apple catalogue number SAPCOR 14) and in America on November 9 (as ST 3370). To tie in with the album's release, "My Sweet Lord" was issued as a single in some European countries. In early December, by which point Harrison's version was dominating the airwaves, the single was released in the US, with "Little Girl" on the B-side. The single peaked at number 90 on the Billboard Hot 100 chart of February 27, 1971.

In Billboard's album review, the writer welcomed Harrison's production and songwriting contributions. The reviewer continued: "Preston's got that church feeling, and gospel backgrounds ring out behind his jazzy, soulful and high revival treatments of the Beatles' 'I Got a Feeling,' 'Right Now' and 'Little Girl.' Preston is a complete musician with a classy concept of gospel-rock."

Although it failed to achieve commercial success, Encouraging Words came to be viewed as one of Preston's best albums by his fans, and one of the best non-Beatle Apple releases. In 1974, by which time Preston had had several major chart hits as an A&M Records artist, Harrison was attempting to acquire the rights to Preston's Apple albums and reissue them. In an interview for the NME that year, Preston attributed his lack of success on the Beatles' label largely to the "internal dissension at Apple" and said that he and Harrison were "convinced that some of those Apple cuts were among the best I've ever done".

In the 2010 BBC Radio program Billy Preston: That's the Way God Planned It, former Yes keyboardist Rick Wakeman, the show's presenter, lamented that Preston's solo career tended to be overshadowed by his work as a sideman for better-known acts such as the Beatles and the Rolling Stones. With reference to That's the Way God Planned It and Encouraging Words, Wakeman said: "It's very frustrating when people only remember Billy as a session man, because these two largely overlooked albums are absolute gems – a perfect combination of gospel and funk." Apple historian and Record Collector journalist Andy Davis describes the two albums as "warm powerful soul records that blend gospel, funk and R&B, shot through with elements of rock", and he highlights Encouraging Words as "one of the finest titles in the Apple Records catalogue".

The 1993 and 2010 CD releases of Encouraging Words included Preston's rare Apple A-side "All That I've Got (I'm Gonna Give It to You)", recorded in December 1969. Released in January 1970, the song was co-written with soul singer Doris Troy, whose self-titled Apple album was originally released on the same day as Encouraging Words.

== Track listing ==
All songs by Billy Preston, except where noted.

=== Original release ===
Side one

1. "Right Now" – 3:14
2. "Little Girl" – 3:28
3. "Use What You Got" – 4:22
4. "My Sweet Lord" (George Harrison) – 3:21
5. "Let the Music Play" (Preston, Joe Greene, Jesse Kirkland) – 2:44
6. "The Same Thing Again" (Preston, James Herndon) – 4:32

Side two

7. "I've Got a Feeling" (John Lennon and Paul McCartney) – 2:51
8. "Sing One for the Lord" (Harrison, Preston) – 3:49
9. "When You Are Mine" – 2:45
10. "I Don't Want You to Pretend" – 2:38
11. "Encouraging Words" – 3:35
12. "All Things (Must) Pass" (Harrison) – 3:43
13. "You've Been Acting Strange" (Ronnie Lee Williams) – 3:27

=== CD bonus tracks (1993 and 2010 remasters) ===
14. "As Long as I Got My Baby" – 2:42
15. "All That I've Got (I'm Gonna Give It to You)" (Preston, Doris Troy) – 3:34

=== New bonus track (added to 2010 remaster) ===
16. "How Long Has This Train Been Gone" (Preston, Bruce Fisher) – 3:17

== Personnel ==
No comprehensive musician credits have ever been compiled for Encouraging Words. The following are named in Andy Davis' liner notes for the 2010 CD.

- Billy Preston – vocals, organ, piano, electric piano, harmonica, backing vocals
- George Harrison – electric guitar, Moog synthesizer, backing vocals
- Eric Clapton – electric guitar (1, 3, 11)
- Delaney Bramlett – electric guitar (11), backing vocals
- Klaus Voormann – bass guitar
- Carl Radle – bass guitar
- Jim Gordon – drums
- Ringo Starr – drums
- Bobby Keys – saxophones
- Jim Price – trumpet, trombone, horn arrangements
- The Edwin Hawkins Singers – backing vocals (4, 12)
- members of the Temptations' tour band – electric guitar, bass guitar, drums
- members of Sam & Dave's tour band – bass guitar, drums
- uncredited string arrangements and percussion
- Richard Polak – photography
