= That's the Way God Planned It =

Studio album by Billy Preston
- Released: 22 August 1969 (UK); 10 September 1969 (US)
- Recorded: late 1968; April–July 1969
- Studio: Capitol (Hollywood), EMI and Olympic Sound (London)
- Genre: Soul; gospel
- Length: 44.29
- Label: Apple
- Producer: George Harrison

Billy Preston chronology
Club Meeting (1967)	That's the Way God Planned It (1969)	Encouraging Words (1970)

Singles from That's the Way God Planned It
- 1. "Hey Brother" Released: 19 October 1968; 2. "That's the Way God Planned It" Released: 27 June 1969 (UK); 7 July 1969 (US); 3. "Everything's All Right" Released: 17 October 1969 (UK); 24 October 1969 (US)

That's The Way God Planned It is the fourth studio album by the American musician Billy Preston, released in August 1969 on Apple Records. The album followed Preston's collaboration with the Beatles on their "Get Back" single and was produced by George Harrison. The title track became a hit in the UK when issued as a single. Aside from Harrison, other contributors to the album include Keith Richards, Eric Clapton, Ginger Baker and Doris Troy.

== 1969 liner notes ==
Derek Taylor's sleevenotes to the original Apple release praised Preston as a wonderful new signing. "Billy Preston is the best thing to happen to Apple this year. He’s young and beautiful and kind and he sings and plays like the son of God."

Preston himself wrote in the notes:

Music is my life and every day I live it, and it’s a good life to everything I want to say through music it gets to you. I may not be the best around but I’m surely not the worst. I learned to play and sing since the age of three, you don’t know how glad I am God laid his hands on me. Apple is the Company for all people that know where it’s at and love love peace love joy and all mankind. I am very grateful to be a part of it. It won’t be long before we change the whole system that holds and keeps the artist’s mind messed up. All thanks must be given to the fab Beatles. People should realize that what they have gone through has not been in vain and they are using it to the best of their ability.

== Reception ==
Professional ratings
Review scores
Source	Rating
AllMusic	4/5 stars
Tom Hull	B+
Mojo	3/5 stars
Record Collector	4/4 stars

Record Collector's reviewer writes that "[The album reveals] the organist to be an accomplished, spiritually engaging singer-songwriter." In his preview of Apple Records' 2010 reissues, for Rolling Stone, David Fricke lists That's the Way God Planned It among his top five non-Beatle Apple albums. Fricke writes of the song "That's the Way God Planned It": "[Preston] would have bigger hits in the Seventies but never make a better one than this album's rapturous title track … The rest of the album is solid church-infused soul, with Preston covering both Bob Dylan and W.C. Handy." Reviewing the album for Blues & Soul, Sharon Davis writes that "this is an extremely worthy release; reminding us of Billy's enormous and irreplaceable contribution to music."

== Track listing ==
All songs by Billy Preston, except where noted.

Side one

1. "Do What You Want" – 3:44
2. "I Want to Thank You" – 3:13
3. "Everything's All Right" (Preston, Doris Troy) – 2:44
4. "She Belongs to Me" (Bob Dylan) – 4:09
5. "It Doesn't Matter" – 2:41
6. "Morning Star" (W. C. Handy, Mack David) – 3:20

Side two

1. "Hey Brother" (Preston, Jesse Kirkland) – 2:34
2. "What About You" – 2:10
3. "Let Us All Get Together (Right Now)" (Preston, Troy) – 4:06
4. "This Is It" (Preston, Troy) – 2:45
5. "Keep It to Yourself" – 2:47
6. "That's the Way God Planned It (Parts 1 & 2)" – 5:34

=== CD bonus tracks (1991 and 2010 remasters) ===
13. "Through All Times" – 3:58
14. "As I Get Older" (Preston, Sly Stone) – 3:42
15. "That's the Way God Planned it" (alternate, previously unreleased version) – 4:13

=== New bonus track (added to 2010 remaster) ===
16. "Something's Got to Change" (Preston, Arthur Fullilove, Melvin Ray Jernigan) – 2:12

== Personnel ==
- Billy Preston – vocals, piano, Hammond organ, tack piano, backing vocals, Fender Rhodes electric piano (CD bonus tracks only)
- George Harrison – electric guitar, acoustic guitar, Moog synthesizer, sitar
- Eric Clapton – electric guitar
- Keith Richards – bass guitar on "Do What You Want" and "That's the Way God Planned It (Parts 1 & 2)"
- Ginger Baker – drums, tambourine
- Doris Troy – backing vocals
- Madeline Bell – backing vocals
- John Barham – string arrangements
