= Doris Troy =

American actress and singer (1937–2004)

Background information
- Also known as: Doris Payne
- Born: Doris Elaine Higginsen; January 6, 1937
- Origin: New York City, U.S.
- Died: February 16, 2004 (aged 67) Las Vegas, Nevada, U.S.
- Genres: R&B, doo-wop
- Occupations: Singer and songwriter
- Instrument: Vocals
- Years active: 1962–2004
- Labels: Apple, Atlantic, People, Toast
- Website: simonbell.com/doristroy.html

Doris Troy (born Doris Elaine Higginsen; January 6, 1937 – February 16, 2004) was an American R&B singer and songwriter, known to her fans as "Mama Soul". Her biggest hit was "Just One Look", a top-10 hit in 1963.

== Life and career ==
She was born as Doris Elaine Higginsen, in the Bronx, the daughter of a Barbadian Pentecostal minister. She later took her grandmother's name and grew up as Doris Payne. Her parents disapproved of "subversive" forms of music like rhythm & blues, so she cut her teeth singing in her father's choir. At the age of 16, she was working as an usherette at the Apollo where she was discovered by James Brown. Under the name Doris Payne, she began songwriting and earned $100 in 1960 for the Dee Clark hit "How About That".

Going into the recording industry, Troy worked as a backup vocalist for Atlantic Records alongside Dionne and Dee Dee Warwick. She was also part of the original lineup of The Sweet Inspirations in 1963, with Cissy Houston and the two Warwicks, who were Houston's nieces. Taking her stage name from Helen of Troy, Troy sang backup vocals for Solomon Burke, the Drifters, Houston, and Dionne Warwick, before she co-wrote and recorded "Just One Look" (the songwriting credits use the name Doris Payne). This song hit No. 10 on the US Billboard Hot 100 in 1963.

"Just One Look" was the only charting US hit for Troy. The song was recorded in 10 minutes in October 1962, with producer Buddy Lucas, as a demo for Atlantic Records. However, after Atlantic Records heard the demo, they decided not to re-record it, instead releasing it unchanged. The musicians included Ernie Hayes on organ, Wally Richardson on guitar, Bob Bushnell on bass, and Bernard "Pretty" Purdie on drums. The song has been covered by The Hollies, Faith, Hope & Charity, Major Lance, Linda Ronstadt, Bryan Ferry, Anne Murray, Klaus Nomi, and Harry Nilsson in a duet with Lynda Laurence. Troy's only foray into the UK Singles Chart, "Whatcha Gonna Do About It", peaked at No. 37 in December 1964.

In 1968, her single "I'll Do Anything" was released in the UK on the Toast label. It was reviewed by Bob "The Bear" Hite of Canned Heat in the "Blind Date" section of Melody Maker. Hite said that he wasn't a fan of records with big symphony backings.

After moving to London in 1969, she was signed by The Beatles to their Apple Records label, and released the Doris Troy album the following year, co-produced by Troy and George Harrison. Troy worked in the UK throughout the 1970s, appearing at Ronnie Scott's Club and recording a live album, The Rainbow Testament. Neither The Rainbow Testament nor her People Records album, Stretching Out, sold well.

As her solo career peaked, she continued to sing back-up for multiple artists and bands. She contributed vocals to The Rolling Stones' 1968 song "You Can't Always Get What You Want", Pink Floyd's The Dark Side of the Moon, and Carly Simon's "You're So Vain". In addition, she also sang for Humble Pie, Kevin Ayers, Edgar Broughton, George Harrison, Johnny Hallyday, Vivian Stanshall, Dusty Springfield, Nick Drake, and Junior Campbell.

In 1974, Troy moved from England back to the United States, where she played casinos and nightclubs.

Mama, I Want to Sing is a stage musical based on her life, and was co-written with her sister, Vy Higginsen, a popular New York City radio personality. It ran for 1,500 performances at the Heckscher Theatre in Spanish Harlem. Troy played her own mother, Geraldine. Chaka Khan played her aunt in the London production, as did Deniece Williams. Mama, I Want to Sing! was also made into a motion picture, starring Ciara, Patti LaBelle, and Hill Harper, which was released on DVD in 2012.

Troy died from emphysema at her home in Las Vegas, Nevada, aged 67.

== Discography ==
=== Studio albums ===
- Sings Just One Look & Other Memorable Selections (1963)
- Doris Troy (1970)
- Rainbow Testament (1972)
- Stretching Out (1974)

=== Singles ===
Year	Title	Peak chart positions		
Year	Title	US Pop	US R&B	UK
1963	"Just One Look"	10	3	―
1963	"What'cha Gonna Do About It"	102	21	37
1963	"Tomorrow Is Another Day"	118	―	―
1964	"Please Little Angel"	128	―	―
1965	"Heartaches"	―	―	―
1965	"I'll Do Anything (He Wants Me to Do)"	―	―	―
1970	"Ain't That Cute"	―	―	―
1973	"Baby I Love You"	―	―	―
1974	"Stretchin' Out"	―	―	―
1976	"Black Star"	―	―	―
1977	"Can't Hold On"	―	―	―
"—" denotes releases that did not chart or were not released in that territory.
