= The Lord Loves the One (That Loves the Lord) =

Song by George Harrison

from the album Living in the Material World
- Published: Material World Charitable Foundation (administered by Harrisongs)
- Released: 30 May 1973
- Recorded: 2 October 1972
- Genre: Rock
- Length: 4:34
- Label: Apple
- Songwriter: George Harrison
- Producer: George Harrison

"The Lord Loves the One (That Loves the Lord)" is a song by English rock musician George Harrison, released on his 1973 album Living in the Material World. Like the album's title track, it was inspired by the teachings of A.C. Bhaktivedanta Swami Prabhupada, founder of the International Society for Krishna Consciousness (ISKCON), more commonly known as the Hare Krishna movement. The song is an uptempo rock track with elements of blues and gospel. Some commentators have described it as the musical highpoint of Living in the Material World, with Harrison's slide guitar playing singled out as being among the finest performances of his career.

The composition originated during a period marked by Harrison's devotion to a Hindu-aligned ascetic life and the height of his public association with the Hare Krishna movement, which included his donation of Bhaktivedanta Manor for use as an ISKCON temple. In his lyrics, Harrison sings of the falsehood of striving for wealth or power in the material world and advocates a direct relationship with one's deity as a genuine life goal. In doing so, he belittles the role of political leaders, as well as his own status as a celebrated rock musician. The song's Krishna Conscious message was also reflected in Harrison's choice of artwork for the Material World album, specifically the reproduction of a painting from a Prabhupada-published edition of the Bhagavad Gita.

Harrison recorded "The Lord Loves the One" between October 1972 and March 1973 with session musicians Nicky Hopkins, Klaus Voormann, Jim Keltner and Jim Horn. While the music has invited critical praise, the devout assertions in Harrison's lyrics typified what some reviewers in 1973 viewed as an overly didactic message on much of the parent album. Among reviewers in the 21st century, the composition continues to divide opinion. Although some commentators consider it an obvious choice as a live track, Harrison performed "The Lord Loves the One" only once in concert – on the opening night of his 1974 North American tour with Ravi Shankar.

== Background ==
[If] I didn't get feedback from Prabhupada on my songs about Krsna or the philosophy, I'd get it from the devotees. That's all the encouragement I needed really ... He's the one who explained to me how we're not these physical bodies. We just happen to be in them.

— George Harrison to ISKCON devotee Mukunda Goswami, 1982

In his 1980 autobiography, I, Me, Mine, George Harrison credits the influence for "The Lord Loves the One (That Loves the Lord)" to A.C. Bhaktivedanta Swami Prabhupada, founder of the International Society for Krishna Consciousness (ISKCON), also known as the Hare Krishna movement. Harrison's association with ISKCON began in December 1968, when he befriended a small group of devotees that Prabhupada had sent to London to establish what became the Radha Krishna Temple. The Gaudiya Vaishnava teachings of Prabhupada, based on Hindu texts such as the Bhagavad Gita, resonated with Harrison, whose quest for an ego-less, God-conscious existence amid the false reality of Beatlemania had first taken him to India in September 1966.

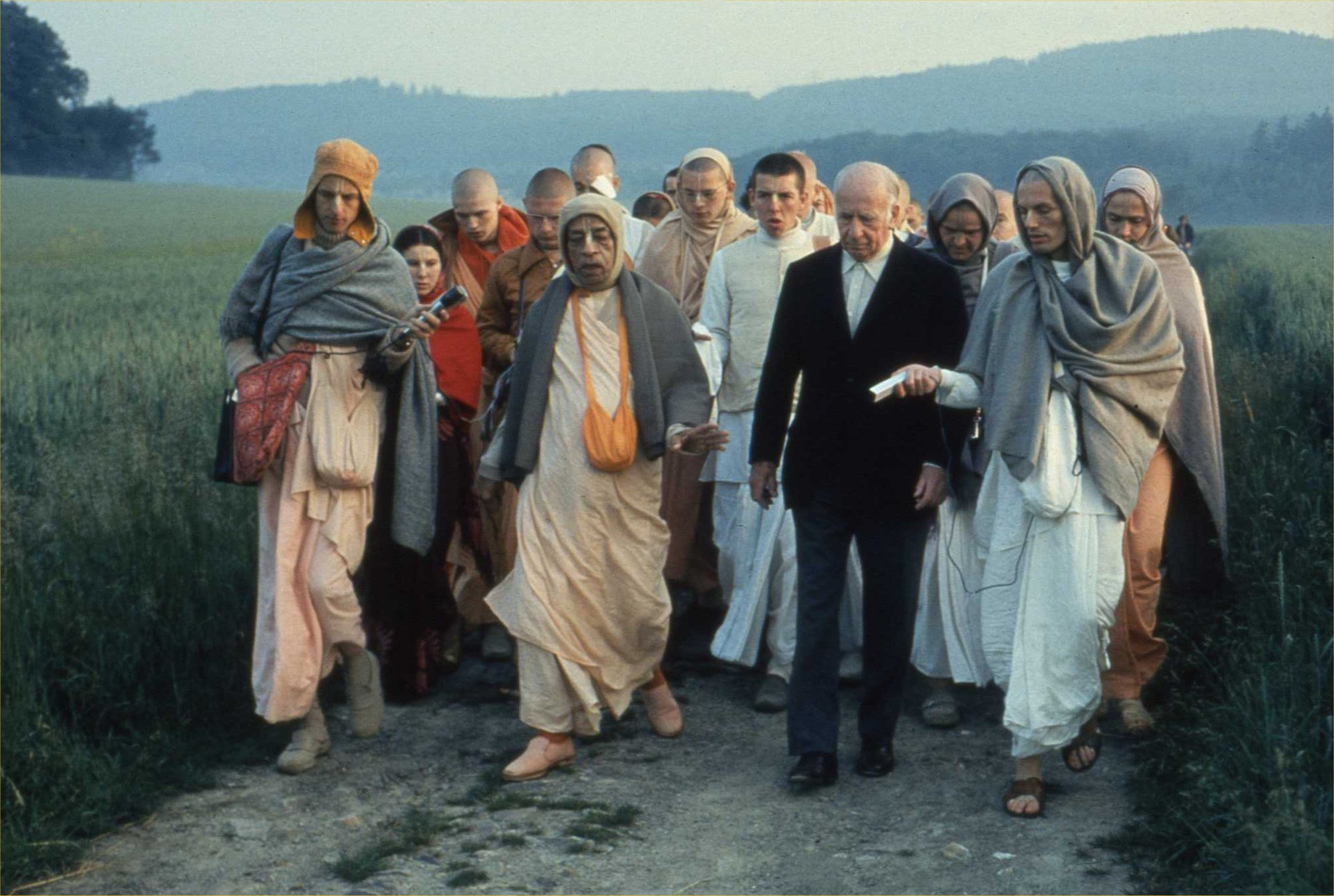
Swami Prabhupada (front row, second from left) and devotees in conversation with Karlfried Graf Dürckheim during the 1970s

Harrison provided the devotees with financial assistance, in addition to producing their hit recording of the 5000-year-old Hare Krishna mantra, to help spread the message of Krishna Consciousness. He then met Prabhupada in England in September 1969 and was impressed by the acharya's declaration that he was merely "the humble servant of the servant of the servant" of the Hindu god Krishna. In line with Prabhupada's contention that the chanting of Sanskrit mantras led to a direct connection with God, Harrison adopted the practice, counting out each mantra on Hindu prayer beads stored inside a cloth bag that he wore over his shoulder.

Further Harrison-produced recordings by the Radha Krishna Temple followed their "Hare Krishna Mantra" single, culminating in an eponymous album released on Apple Records in May 1971. By that time, the devotees were regular guests at Harrison's Friar Park estate, and he subsequently bought permanent accommodation for the growing UK arm of ISKCON, at what became known as Bhaktivedanta Manor. When Prabhupada died in November 1977, he bequeathed one of the rings he was wearing to Harrison, referring to him as the Hare Krishna movement's "archangel".

== Composition ==
Author Dale Allison writes of the lyrical themes in "The Lord Loves the One (That Loves the Lord)": "this song preaches karma, warns about judgment at death, and exalts love as our most important aspiration." Harrison wrote the song over 1971–72, a period of heightened devotion on his part, as well as one of frustration due to the legal and business issues afflicting his Concert for Bangladesh aid project. The idea for the composition came about after a conversation with Prabhupada, when the latter visited Harrison at Friar Park.

The song begins with a riff over the chords of B major and B7, which is then followed by a chorus, rather than a verse. Author Simon Leng describes the musical mood as "mean, dirty blues – funky and low-down", accompanying a "most uncompromising lyric". In Allison's view, the lyrics to the chorus equate love received from one's deity with "human love" (in that it "grows as it is reciprocated"), while also serving as a statement on karmic retribution:

The Lord loves the one that loves the Lord
And the law says if you don't give, then you don't get loving
Now the Lord helps those that help themselves
And the law says whatever you do's gonna come right back on you.

The first verse reflects Harrison and Prabhupada's discussion that day – although the reference to political leaders "acting like big girls" is an example of Harrison reverting to "Scouse parlance", according to author Alan Clayson. The latter also notes the antipathy that Harrison felt towards politicians following the Bangladesh aid project, when the American and British governments continued to withhold funds intended for the millions of starving Bangladeshi refugees. The lyric centres on maya, or the illusory nature of human existence, as Harrison sings of humankind behaving as if "we own this whole world", oblivious to the consequences and the end that awaits the individual in this life. Allison summarises the message to mean: "karma is the law of our existence; substituting ego for God is our problem; we must prepare ourselves for death."

Most of the world is fooling about, especially the people who think they control the world and the community. The presidents, the politicians, the military, etc., are all jerking about acting as if they are Lord over their own domains. That's basically Problem One on the planet.

— Harrison discussing the song with I, Me, Mine editor Derek Taylor, 1979

As with another Prabhupada-inspired track that he wrote during this period, "Living in the Material World", Harrison expresses his belief that the pursuit of fame and riches – particularly in the music industry – is meaningless. In the second verse of "The Lord Loves the One", he sings: "We all fool around, with objectives in mind / To become rich or famous, with our reputations signed ..." While author Joshua Greene compares Harrison's songs from this period to Vedic sutras, Allison specifies this verse-two message to a passage from the Katha Upanishad, which reads: "Intoxicated, deluded by the glamour of riches, the childish do not see that they must pass away. They think, 'This is the world and there is no other.'"

As with the ISKCON-inspired "Awaiting on You All", Allison views the conditions that Harrison imposes in the song's choruses as a rare exception within the singer's work. Elsewhere, Allison continues, Harrison's songwriting reveals "a strong belief in the efficacy of unmerited divine grace". In a 1982 interview, Harrison described his statement on God rewarding those who first look to God as a "flexible" one, adding: "In one way, I'm never going to get out of here [i.e., escape the constant cycle of reincarnation] unless it's by His grace, but then again … [t]he amount of grace I would expect from God should be equal to the amount of grace I can gather or earn."

Among other Harrison biographers' interpretations of the lyrics, Ian Inglis writes of Harrison's unwelcome "evangelical" message regarding "the consequences of a life of selfishness and greed which finds no place for 'the Lord'". In contrast, Leng views the verses as "the singer's inner conversation", in which Harrison acknowledges the futility of his own existence, at a time when he felt overwhelmed by his success as a solo artist following the Beatles' break-up in 1970. Of the apparent sermonising in the choruses, Leng concludes: "'The Lord Loves the One' conveys the same basic message as 'what you put in is what you get out,' so, at one level, it's more a matter of common sense than divine revelation."

== Recording ==
Harrison began sessions for his Living in the Material World album in October 1972, at Apple Studio in London. As a result of the problems associated with the Bangladesh project, author Peter Doggett writes, "[e]verything connected with the physical world seemed to annoy him." The studio manager at the time, former Beatles engineer Geoff Emerick, recalls Harrison wearing his Hindu prayer bag and "mumbling away, chanting his mantra", often unable to reply to questions put to him. As for all the tracks on the album, the recording engineer on "The Lord Loves the One (That Loves the Lord)" was Phil McDonald, who had also worked in that capacity for the Beatles.

The recording opens with Harrison's acoustic guitar and an electric piano riff that creates "a sense of foreboding", according to Inglis, who likens the intro to Three Dog Night's 1970 hit single "Mama Told Me Not to Come". Along with Harrison, the musicians on the basic track were Jim Keltner (drums), Nicky Hopkins (electric piano) and Klaus Voormann (bass). Part of Harrison's guide vocal from the basic track was retained for the official release.

Among the overdubs, which were completed by the end of February 1973, Harrison added slide guitar and Jim Horn played various saxophone parts that Leng describes as "a straight lift from Harrison's favorite 'Savoy Truffle' model", with baritone saxophone prominent in the mix. (Note: Released on the Beatles' White Album in 1968, "Savoy Truffle" features a horn arrangement by Chris Thomas, who also played electric piano on the song.) Assisting Horn on "The Lord Loves the One", Voormann played one of the tenor saxophone parts, a role he had recently provided on Harry Nilsson's Son of Schmilsson album (1972), to which Harrison and Hopkins also contributed.

== Release and representation in album artwork ==
Lyric insert artwork for the Material World album, taken from a Prabhupada-published version of the Bhagavad Gita

Apple released Living in the Material World in May 1973 in the United States (June 1973 in Britain), with "The Lord Loves the One (That Loves the Lord)" sequenced as the first track on side two of the LP. According to authors Chip Madinger and Mark Easter, Harrison had considered an alternative running order, whereby the album opener, "Give Me Love (Give Me Peace on Earth)", began side two. The UK cassette format followed the latter sequence, which also placed "The Lord Loves the One" as the second track on side one, following "Sue Me, Sue You Blues". As with eight other songs on Material World, Harrison donated the copyright to "The Lord Loves the One" to the Material World Charitable Foundation, which he launched in April 1973 with a stated aim "to encourage the exploration of alternative life views and philosophies".

Reflecting the lyrical content of songs such as "The Lord Loves the One" and "Living in the Material World", Tom Wilkes's design for the album artwork contrasted a devout spiritual existence with life in the material world. The front of the inner-sleeve insert reproduced a painting from a Prabhupada-published edition of the Bhagavad Gita, depicting Krishna and the warrior prince Arjuna driving a chariot. (Note: Published by Prabhupada's Bhaktivedanta Book Trust in 1972, the book was titled Bhagavad Gita As It Is.) Part of this image was also used on the LP's side-one face label; in addition, it appeared opposite the words to "The Lord Loves the One" in the lyrics section of the Material World songbook, published by the Charles Hansen sheet music company.

Writing in 1977, author Nicholas Schaffner described the combination of these "color representations of the Hindu scriptures" and the album-wide message espoused by Harrison in "The Lord Loves the One" as "a luxuriant rock devotional designed to transform his fans' stereo equipment into a temple". (Note: As a contrast with the scene from the Bhagavad Gita, the album's inner gatefold contained a photograph showing Harrison and his fellow musicians at a Last Supper-style banquet, behind which are items of material opulence such as a stretch limousine, a sportscar, and a country mansion with attendant staff.) In a 1982 interview with ISKCON's Mukunda Goswami, Harrison discussed the song's lyrics and referred to his use of the Krishna and Arjuna picture, along with the credit he gave Prabhupada's book, as a "plug" for the Hare Krishna movement.

== Critical reception ==
=== Contemporary reviews ===
The song, if not the title alone, was a source of irritation for those critics who deemed Living in the Material World overly preachy and didactic. In a full-page album review in Melody Maker, Michael Watts summarised his impression of Harrison's spiritual message: "One gets this feeling of George, somewhat remote and rarefied, indicting the world for being what it is, although if anybody could change the world it would be an old Beatle." While noting the song as an autobiographical statement on the singer's "struggle to retain personal dignity and peace of mind", Watts wrote: "He's dealing in lofty sentiments and abstractions; not everyone will want to drink of the cup."

In his 1973 album review for the NME, Tony Tyler described Material World as "so damn holy I could scream". Two years later, he and his Beatles: An Illustrated Record co-author Roy Carr remarked of Harrison's religious beliefs: "it's difficult to see why he travelled all the way to India to import a God who, by the sound of him ('The Lord Loves the One [That] Loves the Lord') is as intractable and selfish as the petulant Jehovah of Victorian Sunday schools."

To Stephen Holden of Rolling Stone, the track was "a compelling gospel-flavored rocker ... a stunning achievement that carries the authority of pop scripture". On an album that he considered "a pop religious ceremony for all seasons, one in which Harrison acts as priest, deliberately placing his gifts and his legend into public service for God", Holden added of the song: "I hope that Aretha Franklin gets her hands on it, and soon."

=== Retrospective reviews and legacy ===
Among reviewers in the 21st century, Zeth Lundy of PopMatters and Music Box editor John Metzger highlight "The Lord Loves the One" as one of the standout tracks on Living in the Material World. As with "The Day the World Gets 'Round", Simon Leng sees the lyrics' spiritual framework as a distraction from the true message of the song, which in this case is the "bankruptcy" of the music business. While noting that the media and anyone else associated with "the rock circus" had a vested interest in upholding its importance, Leng comments on the hostile reception afforded the song originally: "In 1973, no one dared point out that the emperor had no clothes on – except Harrison." (Note: In a later example of what he terms "'inspirational' counsel [that] drew naked fire", Leng views Bob Dylan's 1979 single "Gotta Serve Somebody" as a restatement of the sentiments expressed in "The Lord Loves the One" and "The Day the World Gets 'Round". Leng suggests that "there isn't so much as a cigarette paper's thickness" between Dylan's line "You might be a rock 'n' roll addict prancing on the stage" and Harrison's lyrics in verse two of "The Lord Loves the One".)

Some people have thought that in certain songs like this one, I was giving them a telling-off or that I was implying that I was "holier than thou". I do not exclude myself and write a lot of things in order to make myself remember.

— Harrison in I, Me, Mine, responding to detractors of his lyrics to "The Lord Loves the One"

Author Robert Rodriguez describes "The Lord Loves the One" as "not the sanctimonious rant that some characterized it as", but a revelation of Harrison's inner conflict between his "earthly" status as a rock star and that role's "utter triviality in the Grand Scheme of things". Conversely, writing for Rough Guides, Chris Ingham finds the song's "'law says' finger-wagging" the exception on an album that otherwise "conveys his struggle" between the physical and spiritual worlds "with restraint and, in places, considerable grace and beauty", while former Mojo editor Mat Snow commented in 2006 of this and the majority of the songs on Material World: "The rest is Hari Georgeson at his most preachy, but it's never less than musical and often light on its feet." Also writing for Mojo, John Harris pairs "The Lord Loves the One" with "Give Me Love", as two tracks that support Material World's standing as "a Hindu concept album … a pleasing fusion of Eastern religion, gospel, and the ghost of 'For You Blue'".

In his unfavourable assessment of the song, Ian Inglis contrasts it with the "impressive set of lyrics" on "Living in the Material World" and criticises Harrison for his "turgid proselytizing", which he likens to "the imprecations of an evangelical preacher". Inglis concludes: "Harrison's impressive guitar work helps to compensate for the absence of a clear melody, but the song is ultimately undermined by some of his least-effective lyrics; the description of political leaders as 'big girls' is puerile and sexist." Another Harrison biographer, Elliot Huntley, describes "The Lord Loves the One" as a "polished foot-tapper", on which "the drums push the song along nicely but the excessively wordy libretto somehow struggles to fit". Terry Staunton of Record Collector considers Living in the Material World to be "sloganeering with slide guitars" but lacking in any "out-and-out protest" message, such that "the more generalised, universally religious themes of The Lord Loves The One (That Loves The Lord) tend to sound a tad diluted."

Leng praises the track's musical accompaniment, highlighting Horn's sax arrangement and particularly Harrison's slide-guitar playing, which includes a solo that he views as "one of the best of his career". Similar sentiments come from Bruce Eder of AllMusic, who writes: "'The Lord Loves the One (That Loves the Lord)', despite its title, is the high point of the record, a fast, rollicking, funky, bluesy jewel with a priceless guitar break (maybe the best of Harrison's solo career) ..." (Note: Among other sources who compliment the lead guitar part, Rodriguez describes Harrison's playing as "stellar", and Madinger and Easter write of his "superb slide guitar work" on the track.)

In a 2011 article for The Huffington Post, coinciding with the release of Martin Scorsese's documentary George Harrison: Living in the Material World, Steve Rabey describes Harrison as "perhaps the most explicitly and consistently theological rock star of the last half-century". Rabey refers to the song among Harrison's "mini-sermons illustrating Hindu concepts" (in this case, karma) and concludes: "While he failed to convert everyone to his beliefs, he nudged his [Beatles] bandmates – and his listener fans – a bit further to the East, encouraging audiences to open themselves to new (or very old) spiritual influences."

== Performance ==
Harrison performed "The Lord Loves the One (That Loves the Lord)" at the start of his 1974 North American tour with Ravi Shankar. In addition to Jim Horn, the horn players on this live version were Tom Scott and Chuck Findley. Consistent with his perception of an anti-stardom message in the song, Leng writes of there being an "immense [paradox]" in Harrison's attitude to this highly publicised tour, since: "here was one of the world's most famous musicians telling a leading writer from Rolling Stone that he'd 'gladly kiss it all good-bye' and pursue his utterly sincere spiritual quest."

On the first show of the tour, at Vancouver's Pacific Coliseum on 2 November, Harrison played the song following his opening instrumental, "Hari's on Tour (Express)". In Rolling Stone, Ben Fong-Torres began his feature article with the words "Holy Krishna! What kind of an opening night for George Harrison is this?", before writing of Harrison's performance of "The Lord Loves the One": "he sang off key, and the voice, in its first flight, instantly sounded tired." (Note: Harrison contracted laryngitis on the eve of the tour, as a result of having overextended himself on projects such as setting up Dark Horse Records, and then combining tour rehearsals with overdubbing the vocals for his 1974 album Dark Horse.) With Shankar's segments having been poorly received, Harrison then reworked the show's setlist, with the result that "The Lord Loves the One" and another Material World track, "Who Can See It", were dropped for the rest of the tour. Leng writes of the song's removal as "a fate the heavy-funky arrangement did not deserve", and Eder similarly considers that "The Lord Loves the One" belonged at "the heart" of any Harrison concert setlist.

Later on during the West Coast leg of his 1974 tour, Harrison donated the profits from one concert to the Haight-Ashbury Free Medical Clinic in San Francisco. As recorded in Fong-Torres's article, Harrison then visited the clinic and sang the chorus of "The Lord Loves the One" to the grateful staff, as a way to illustrate his point: "Don't thank me ... it's something else over us that acts through people like me. I'm just an instrument."

== Personnel ==
- George Harrison – lead vocals, acoustic guitar, slide guitars, backing vocals
- Nicky Hopkins – electric piano
- Klaus Voormann – bass guitar, tenor saxophone
- Jim Keltner – drums, percussion
- Jim Horn – saxophones, horn arrangement

== Sources ==
- Dale C. Allison Jr., The Love There That's Sleeping: The Art and Spirituality of George Harrison, Continuum (New York, NY, 2006; ISBN 978-0-8264-1917-0).
- Keith Badman, The Beatles Diary Volume 2: After the Break-Up 1970–2001, Omnibus Press (London, 2001; ISBN 0-7119-8307-0).
- Roy Carr & Tony Tyler, The Beatles: An Illustrated Record, Trewin Copplestone Publishing (London, 1978; ISBN 0-450-04170-0).
- Harry Castleman & Walter J. Podrazik, All Together Now: The First Complete Beatles Discography 1961–1975, Ballantine Books (New York, NY, 1976; ISBN 0-345-25680-8).
- Chant and Be Happy: The Power of Mantra Meditation, Bhaktivedanta Book Trust (Los Angeles, CA, 1997; ISBN 978-0-89213-118-1).
- Alan Clayson, George Harrison, Sanctuary (London, 2003; ISBN 1-86074-489-3).
- Peter Doggett, You Never Give Me Your Money: The Beatles After the Breakup, It Books (New York, NY, 2011; ISBN 978-0-06-177418-8).
- Graham Dwyer & Richard J. Cole (eds), The Hare Krishna Movement: Forty Years of Chant and Change, I.B. Tauris (London, 2007; ISBN 1-84511-407-8).
- The Editors of Rolling Stone, Harrison, Rolling Stone Press/Simon & Schuster (New York, NY, 2002; ISBN 0-7432-3581-9).
- Geoff Emerick & Howard Massey, Here, There & Everywhere: My Life Recording the Music of the Beatles, Gotham (New York, NY, 2006; ISBN 978-1-59240-269-4).
- George Harrison Living in the Material World: Sheet Music for Piano, Vocal & Guitar, Charles Hansen (New York, NY, 1973).
- Joshua M. Greene, Here Comes the Sun: The Spiritual and Musical Journey of George Harrison, John Wiley & Sons (Hoboken, NJ, 2006; ISBN 978-0-470-12780-3).
- George Harrison, I Me Mine, Chronicle Books (San Francisco, CA, 2002; ISBN 0-8118-3793-9).
- Olivia Harrison, George Harrison: Living in the Material World, Abrams (New York, NY, 2011; ISBN 978-1-4197-0220-4).
- Elliot J. Huntley, Mystical One: George Harrison – After the Break-up of the Beatles, Guernica Editions (Toronto, ON, 2006; ISBN 1-55071-197-0).
- Chris Ingham, The Rough Guide to the Beatles, Rough Guides/Penguin (London, 2006; 2nd edn; ISBN 978-1-84836-525-4).
- Ian Inglis, The Words and Music of George Harrison, Praeger (Santa Barbara, CA, 2010; ISBN 978-0-313-37532-3).
- Peter Lavezzoli, The Dawn of Indian Music in the West, Continuum (New York, NY, 2006; ISBN 0-8264-2819-3).
- Simon Leng, While My Guitar Gently Weeps: The Music of George Harrison, Hal Leonard (Milwaukee, WI, 2006; ISBN 1-4234-0609-5).
- Ian MacDonald, Revolution in the Head: The Beatles' Records and the Sixties, Pimlico (London, 1998; ISBN 0-7126-6697-4).
- Chip Madinger & Mark Easter, Eight Arms to Hold You: The Solo Beatles Compendium, 44.1 Productions (Chesterfield, MO, 2000; ISBN 0-615-11724-4).
- Nori J. Muster, Betrayal of the Spirit: My Life Behind the Headlines of the Hare Krishna Movement, University of Illinois Press (Champaign, IL, 2001; ISBN 0-252-06566-2).
- Chris O'Dell with Katherine Ketcham, Miss O'Dell: My Hard Days and Long Nights with The Beatles, The Stones, Bob Dylan, Eric Clapton, and the Women They Loved, Touchstone (New York, NY, 2009; ISBN 978-1-4165-9093-4).
- Robert Rodriguez, Fab Four FAQ 2.0: The Beatles' Solo Years, 1970–1980, Backbeat Books (Milwaukee, WI, 2010; ISBN 978-1-4165-9093-4).
- Nicholas Schaffner, The Beatles Forever, McGraw-Hill (New York, NY, 1978; ISBN 0-07-055087-5).
- Bruce Spizer, The Beatles Solo on Apple Records, 498 Productions (New Orleans, LA, 2005; ISBN 0-9662649-5-9).
- Gary Tillery, Working Class Mystic: A Spiritual Biography of George Harrison, Quest Books (Wheaton, IL, 2011; ISBN 978-0-8356-0900-5).
- Bob Woffinden, The Beatles Apart, Proteus (London, 1981; ISBN 0-906071-89-5).
