= Don't Let Me Wait Too Long =

Song by George Harrison

from the album Living in the Material World
- Published: Material World Charitable Foundation (administered by Harrisongs)
- Released: 30 May 1973
- Genre: Rock, pop
- Length: 2:57
- Label: Apple
- Songwriter: George Harrison
- Producer: George Harrison

"Don't Let Me Wait Too Long" is a song by English rock musician George Harrison, released on his 1973 album Living in the Material World. It was scheduled to be issued as a single in September that year, as the follow-up to "Give Me Love (Give Me Peace on Earth)", but the release was cancelled. Music critics have traditionally viewed "Don't Let Me Wait Too Long" as a highlight of the Material World album, praising its pop qualities and production, with some considering the song worthy of hit status.

Harrison wrote and recorded "Don't Let Me Wait Too Long" during a period marked by his heightened devotion to Hindu spirituality, which coincided with marital problems with his first wife, Pattie Boyd, and the financial complications affecting his Bangladesh aid project. The track is an upbeat love song in the tradition of early 1960s Brill Building songwriters. Its lyrics have invited debate among commentators as to whether Harrison is addressing a lover such as Boyd or, like the majority of his lyrics on Material World, God.

Although produced by Harrison alone, the recording employs aspects of the Wall of Sound production synonymous with his former collaborator Phil Spector – through the use of reverb, two drummers and multiple acoustic rhythm guitar parts. The musicians accompanying Harrison on the track are Gary Wright, Nicky Hopkins, Ringo Starr, Klaus Voormann and Jim Keltner. In November 1976, during the filming of their joint appearance on Saturday Night Live, Harrison performed "Don't Let Me Wait Too Long" with singer Paul Simon, but the song did not appear in the broadcast.

== Background ==
As with all the new songs on his 1973 album Living in the Material World, George Harrison wrote "Don't Let Me Wait Too Long" in 1971–72, a period of heightened devotion to Hindu spirituality on his part. "Don't Let Me Wait Too Long" is a love song, and in light of problems in Harrison's marriage to Pattie Boyd at the time, Harrison biographer Elliot Huntley remarks: "it's interesting to speculate as to who it was written about ..." Author Jeff Walker suggests that the song's apparently non-devotional subject matter may have resulted from Harrison and Boyd's marital difficulties.

George is just driving around Portugal and the South of France, staying with friends and at hotels ... Sometimes, George goes off on his own. Sometimes he takes Pattie with him, but I think he just felt like a holiday and wanted to get away.

— Musician Gary Wright, explaining the reason for Harrison holidaying without his wife in August 1972

Against Harrison's wishes, Boyd had resumed her modelling career in May 1971, having long felt isolated by her husband's association with the Hare Krishna movement. His Concert for Bangladesh aid project had then united the couple, according to their friend Chris O'Dell, who recalls Harrison as "attentive and affectionate" towards Boyd while planning the concerts that summer. The project's subsequent business and legal issues became a source of frustration for Harrison, as he spent much of 1972 negotiating with government departments for the release of the funds raised for the refugees. In February 1972, Harrison and Boyd were injured in an automobile accident in England, after which, author Alan Clayson writes, "her recovery was impaired by George's pounding on a drum-kit that he'd set up in the next room."

In August that year, Harrison set off for a driving holiday around Europe without Boyd, a trip that Huntley describes as "the first publicly visible signs" of problems in the Harrisons' marriage. While in Portugal, Harrison stayed with his musician friend Gary Wright, who, Huntley suggests, "play[ed] the diplomat" by telling the press: "He's writing lots of new things and he seems to be having a good time ... Sometimes he takes Pattie with him, but I feel he just felt like a holiday and wanted to get away."

== Composition ==
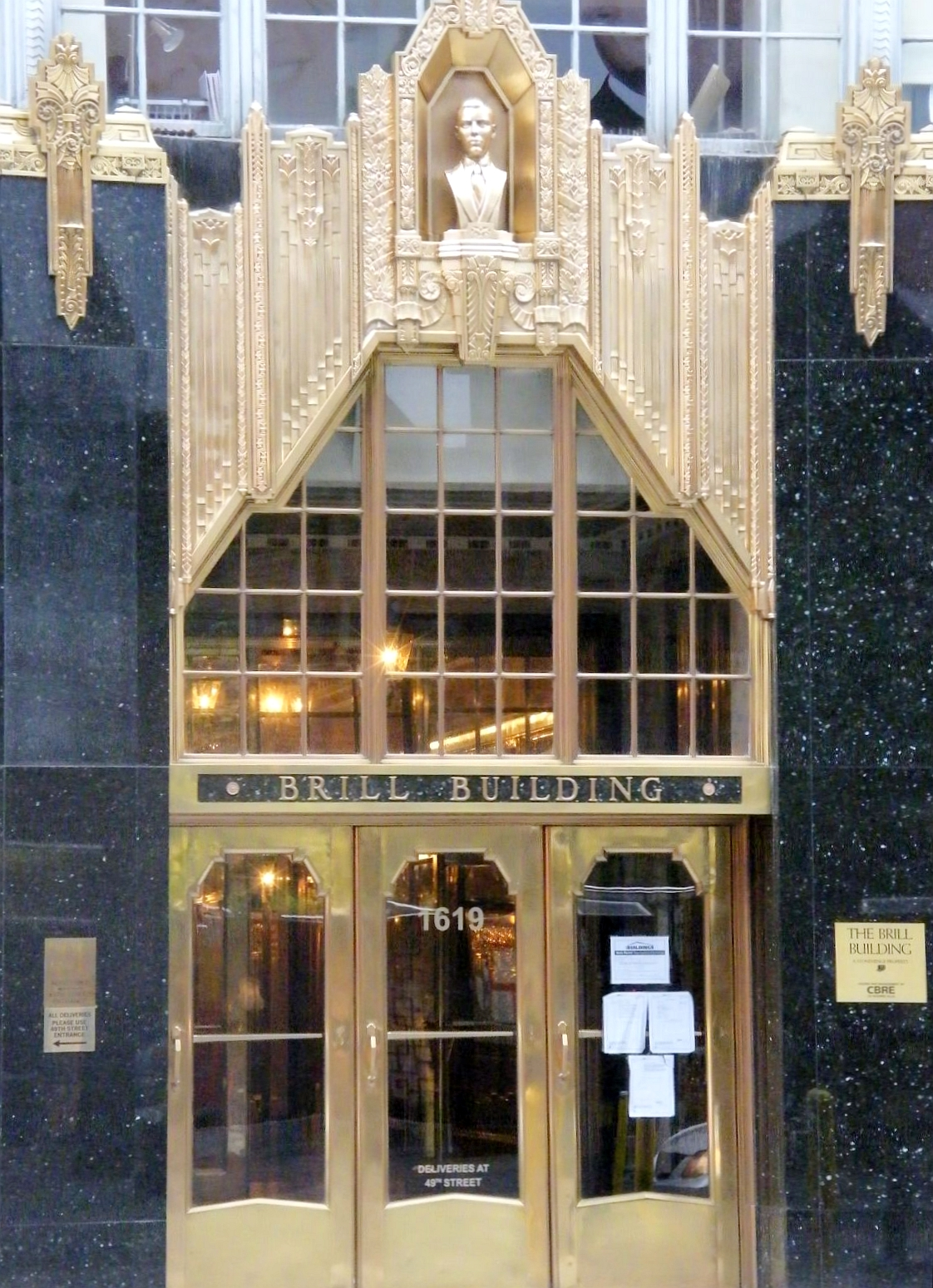
Entrance to the Brill Building, in New York

In his book The Words and Music of George Harrison, Ian Inglis writes that "Don't Let Me Wait Too Long" incorporates many of the elements of pop composition pioneered during the early 1960s at New York's Brill Building, where songwriters such as Barry Mann, Carole King and Gerry Goffin began their careers. Inglis lists these "stock motifs" as "a repetitive and attractive melody", "a stereotypical choice of language", "the familiar topic of lost, or unrequited, love" and "the conventional form of address from a man to a woman, in the persistent use of 'baby'". These elements appear in the song's chorus, where Harrison sings: "How I love you / Baby, so don't let me wait too long."

Harrison biographer Simon Leng views "pop-soul music" as "the obvious root" of "Don't Let Me Wait Too Long" and cites musical tension as one facet of the pop-soul style that Harrison adopts. This tension is evident in the "implie[d] dissonance" during the verses, Leng adds, when Harrison moves from an F major chord to D-flat major. In reference to a lyric in the verses, Clayson suggests: "Although 'Don't Let Me Wait Too Long' betrayed that George's sublimation of lust [in favour of an ascetic path] was by no means total, its consummation was, nonetheless, 'like it came from above'."

Inglis writes that the message of "Don't Let Me Wait Too Long" is "in the title". The theme of waiting is also central to a track that Harrison wrote in 1967 while in the Beatles, "Blue Jay Way", and a similar sentiment appears in his 1970–71 solo hit "My Sweet Lord", through the line "I really want to see you, Lord, but it takes so long". In the latter lyric, Harrison expresses his impatience to see and know God, and Harrison biographer Geoffrey Giuliano interprets "Don't Let Me Wait Too Long" as a further reflection of the singer's spiritual concerns.

All individual love between one person loving another ... is all small parts or small examples of that one universal love ... Singing to the Lord or an individual is, in a way, the same. I've done that consciously in some songs.

— George Harrison, 1976

Whereas Huntley, Inglis and Walker consider that Harrison is addressing a lover in "Don't Let Me Wait Too Long", other commentators, like Giuliano, view the lyrics as being consistent with the predominant theme of Living in the Material World – namely, Harrison's spiritual search amid the temptations of the physical world. (Note: As with his love songs "Let It Down" and "I Don't Care Anymore", released in 1970 and 1974 respectively, Harrison offers no discussion of "Don't Let Me Wait Too Long" in his autobiography.) Of these commentators, Nicholas Schaffner and Bob Woffinden highlight "Sue Me, Sue You Blues" as the album's only song with a non-religious subject matter.

A Christian theologian, Dale Allison has identified a number of Harrison compositions where he finds it "impossible" to discern whether Harrison is proffering love for a woman or his deity, yet he views "Don't Let Me Wait Too Long" as a secular love song. (Note: The lack of clear distinction between the two themes in Harrison's songwriting was first evident in "Long, Long, Long", on the Beatles' White Album (1968). Allison discusses "Your Love Is Forever", "Blow Away", "Love Comes to Everyone" and "Wake Up My Love" among other examples.) Author Chris Ingham similarly writes that, along with the Material World tracks "Who Can See It" and "That Is All", Harrison's expression of love in this song "seems directed as much to an earthly relationship as to any God".

== Recording ==
The sessions for most of the basic tracks for Living in the Material World took place over October and November 1972, with engineer Phil McDonald, but without Harrison's intended co-producer from All Things Must Pass and The Concert for Bangladesh, Phil Spector. (Note: In a 1987 interview, Harrison cited Spector's unreliability and excessive alcohol consumption as reasons for him deciding to produce the new album alone.) According to the album credits, the location for the recording was the Beatles' Apple Studio in London, although bassist Klaus Voormann has stated that the true venue was Harrison's new home studio, FPSHOT, in Oxfordshire.

Aside from Harrison on acoustic guitars, the musicians on the basic track for "Don't Let Me Wait Too Long" were Nicky Hopkins (piano), Wright (keyboards), Voormann (bass), and Ringo Starr and Jim Keltner (both on drums). The Starr–Keltner combination followed their pairing at the Concert for Bangladesh shows; this song was one of three tracks on Material World to which Starr contributed, in between his film work on That'll Be the Day and Son of Dracula. In addition, Pete Ham and Tom Evans of the Apple group Badfinger attended some of the sessions in October, playing acoustic rhythm guitar as they had on much of All Things Must Pass. As with Ham's playing on the 1971-recorded "Try Some, Buy Some", however, any contribution they might have made to "Don't Let Me Wait Too Long" went uncredited on the official release. (Note: Harrison later referred to record companies being "very possessive" of their artists during the early 1970s, and cited this as a reason for EMI-affiliated Apple's omission of contributors such as Eric Clapton from the musician credits for All Things Must Pass. Shortly before the Material World sessions, Badfinger had signed with Warner Bros. Records, a loss to Apple that surprised and upset Harrison.)

Following the completion of the main recording sessions, Harrison carried out overdubbing on the basic tracks through to the end of February 1973. On "Don't Let Me Wait Too Long", the overdubs included his vocals and slide guitar part. Of the last of these, Walker comments that Harrison's playing prior to the refrain further develops the melodic tension evident in the composition.

=== Phil Spector's influence ===
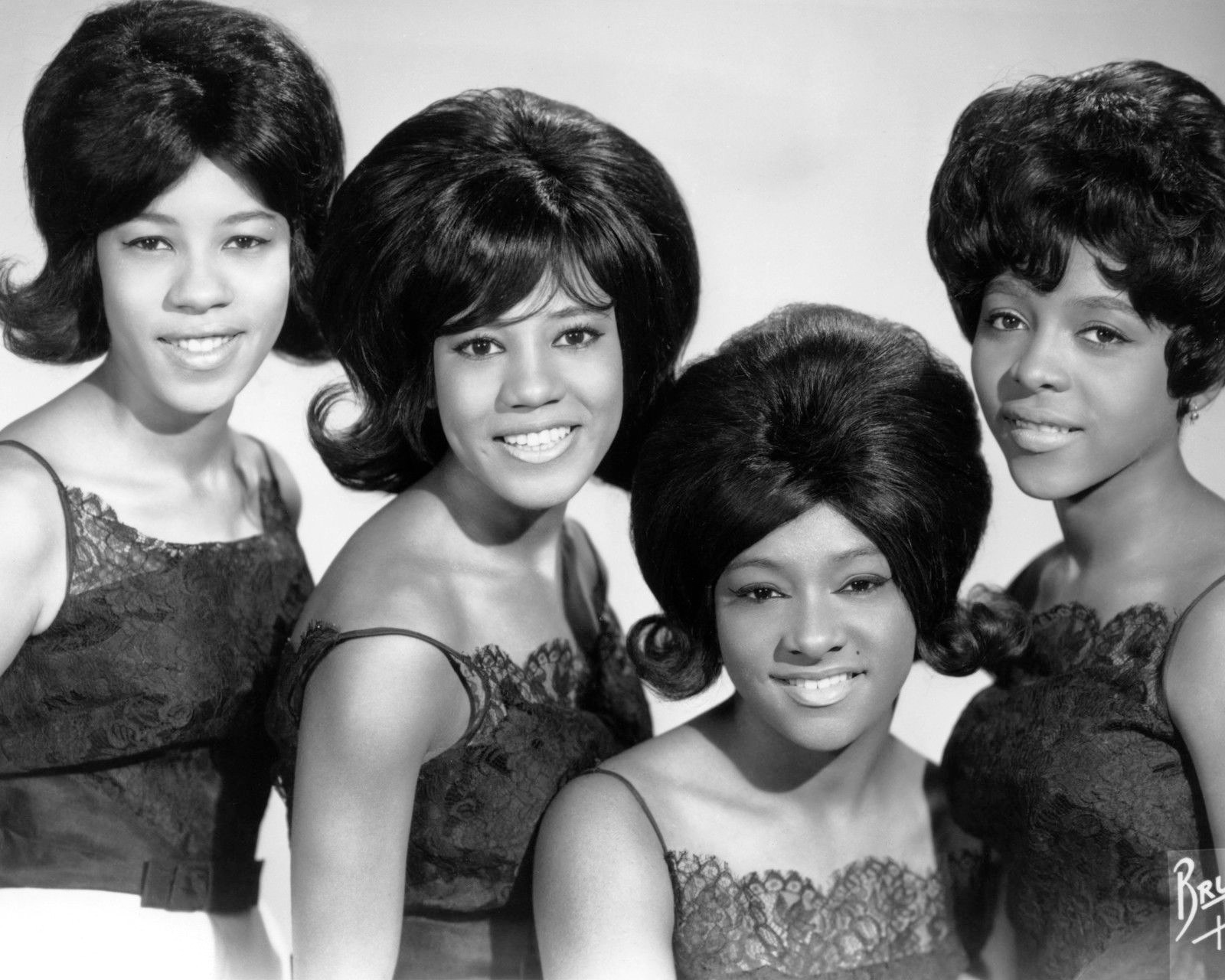
The Crystals (pictured in 1965), recipients of Phil Spector's Wall of Sound production during the 1960s

Despite Spector's absence, the song's production incorporates aspects of his signature Wall of Sound, through the use of reverberation, multiple drummers and layers of rhythm instruments such as acoustic guitars and keyboards. Part of a sound commonly associated with Harrison during the early 1970s, these characteristics were also elements of his 1971 production of Badfinger's "Day After Day" and Lon & Derrek Van Eaton's "Sweet Music". (Note: While working in Los Angeles through the spring of 1973, Harrison adopted a similar sound when producing "I Am Missing You" by Ravi Shankar and in his arrangement for Starr's "Photograph".)

Author Robert Rodriguez describes the recording as "Spector-esque (in a girl group sense)", Harrison having long been an admirer of Spector's work with the Ronettes and the Crystals during the 1960s. Leng writes of "over-the-top tympani" as another Spector influence on "Don't Let Me Wait Too Long"'s "Motown 'orchestration'", while labelling the musical arrangement "English pop". Among other later examples, Harrison revived his version of Spector's Wall of Sound for his 1974 single "Ding Dong, Ding Dong" and the song "If You Believe", from his 1979 album George Harrison.

== Release ==
Apple Records released Living in the Material World on 30 May 1973 in America. "Don't Let Me Wait Too Long" was sequenced on side one of the LP, between the ballads "The Light That Has Lighted the World" and "Who Can See It". The album continued Harrison's run of commercial success following the Beatles' break-up in 1970, topping Billboard's albums chart in the US and peaking at number 2 in Britain, behind the soundtrack to That'll Be the Day. Amid this success, Rodriguez writes, Harrison and Boyd's relationship "finally reached breaking point" in summer 1973, the start of a period through to 1975 that Harrison would describe as his "naughty" years.

=== Planned single release ===
"Don't Let Me Wait Too Long" was scheduled to be the A-side of a second single from the album, as a follow-up to Harrison's US number 1 hit "Give Me Love (Give Me Peace on Earth)". The intended release date was 24 September 1973; an acetate of the single was created, and a US catalogue number assigned (Apple 1866). The release was cancelled at the last minute, for undisclosed reasons.

Noting the song's "hit potential", Leng views the cancellation as "[o]ne of the more anomalous features" of Harrison's musical career. (Note: Whereas the issuing of "What Is Life" as a second single had contributed to the sustained success of All Things Must Pass through most of 1971 – despite the unusually high price tag for Harrison's 1970 triple album – Living in the Material World's chart run on Billboard lasted a comparatively brief 26 weeks.) Leng has speculated that the single was withdrawn because of the similarity between "Don't Let Me Wait Too Long" and "Give Me Love". Author Andrew Grant Jackson suggests that the reason for the cancellation was due to "Don't Let Me Wait Too Long" having a similar sound to "When I'm Dead and Gone", a 1970 hit song by McGuinness Flint. Although Harrison did not enjoy success with "Don't Let Me Wait Too Long" as a single, Leng and Inglis comment that the song anticipated a number of radio-friendly singles by ELO during the 1970s, particularly their 1976 hit "Livin' Thing".

== Reception ==
=== Contemporary reviews ===
An upbeat Harrison song in the mould of "What Is Life" and "You", "Don't Let Me Wait Too Long" has regularly been singled out as one of the highlights of Living in the Material World. In his album review for Rolling Stone, Stephen Holden called the track "a gorgeous, rollicking love song", while Billboard magazine listed it second among the album's "best cuts", after the title track. In Melody Maker, Michael Watts wrote of the song's "Spector touches", including "a crashing two-beat on piano and a great surge of drums, straight from [the Ronettes'] 'Be My Baby'". While otherwise lamenting the overt religiosity of the album, Tony Tyler of the NME identified "Don't Let Me Wait Too Long" as the best track, describing it as "bright and hopeful" with a "memorable melody to commend it".

NME critic Bob Woffinden later remarked on the "exceptionally fine" music on Material World, saying that "Don't Let Me Wait Too Long" "could rank with his best compositions". In his 1977 book The Beatles Forever, Nicholas Schaffner wrote that Harrison and his former bandmates John Lennon and Paul McCartney had "evolved into surprisingly tasteful and meticulous producers" after their long association with Beatles producer George Martin, and added of Harrison: "Surely Phil Spector never had a more attentive pupil."

=== Retrospective assessment ===
Among commentators in the 21st century, authors Chip Madinger and Mark Easter describe "Don't Let Me Wait Too Long" as "a marvelous track" and "a prime piece of pop songwriting", and AllMusic's Bruce Eder praises its "delectable acoustic rhythm guitar" and "great beat". John Metzger of The Music Box writes of the track's "brightly colored radiance" being a "prime example" of how Harrison successfully mixed elements of Spector and Martin's individual styles on Material World. While considering the album's production an improvement on All Things Must Pass, Blogcritics writer Chaz Lipp views the "soaring 'Don't Let Me Wait Too Long'" as a song that "rank[s] right alongside Harrison's best work". Bruce Spizer describes it as "a great rocker", a "hook-laden love song [that] moves at a brisk pace", and concludes: "Had Apple issued the track as planned, it surely would have been a hit." Dale Allison and Elliot Huntley also write of the song deserving hit-single status.

In his review of the 2006 remastered album, for Mojo magazine, Mat Snow said that "this long overdue reissue is worth it alone for four wonderful songs", of which "Don't Let Me Wait Too Long" "reveals the lusty lad within the orange robes" associated with Hare Krishna devotees. More recently, Snow has described Material World as "a treat for the ears" and Harrison as "an old-school pop tunesmith to his marrow, [who] worked hard to ensure the choruses of 'Don't Let Me Wait Too Long,' 'The Day the World Gets 'Round,' and 'Who Can See It' caught the ear with their deep and delicious emotion".

Reviewing the 2014 reissue of Harrison's Apple catalogue, for Classic Rock, Paul Trynka writes that Living in the Material Word "sparkles with many gems", and adds: "but it's the more restrained tracks – Don't Let Me Wait Too Long, Who Can See It – that entrance: gorgeous pop songs, all the more forceful for their restraint." Writing for PopMatters, Scot Elingburg pairs the song with "Be Here Now" as "would-be hits" from Material World that "offer much more than just Harrison's Hindu-inspired teachings; they also offer up the chance for larger dialogue within music." Nick DeRiso, co-founder of the music website Something Else!, includes "Don't Let Me Wait Too Long" among the highlights of Harrison's solo career on Apple Records, and terms it "[a] masterpiece of coiled anticipation".

Simon Leng refers to "Don't Let Me Wait Too Long" as "one of George Harrison's most perfect pop confections", while praising its guitar fills and musical arrangement. Describing it as a "single-that-never-was", Leng suggests that the song would have been a "certain number 1". To Huntley, "Don't Let Me Wait Too Long" is "a superlative slice of almost McCartney-esque pop", with Harrison's "exquisite slide guitar" a particular highlight.

== Other versions ==
In November 1976, Harrison performed "Don't Let Me Wait Too Long" with Paul Simon during the pre-show taping of their joint appearance on NBC Television's Saturday Night Live. The song was omitted from the broadcast, but the performance is available on the bootleg album Living in the Underground, along with other songs that Harrison and Simon played before the studio audience.

In 1977, "Don't Let Me Wait Too Long" was considered for inclusion on Two Man Band, the last of three albums by Splinter on Harrison's Dark Horse record label. Harrison had suggested they cover the track as a compromise between Splinter's vision and the commercial requirements initiated by Dark Horse distributor Warner Bros. Records. As much as singer Bob Purvis admired the song, it did not appear on the official release.

Following Harrison's death in November 2001 at the age of 58, the Late B.P. Helium – formerly Elf Power guitarist Bryan Poole – covered "Don't Let Me Wait Too Long" on his 2003 EP Kumquat Mae. Splendid Media's reviewer wrote that Poole "does the Krishna master proud" with his "soulfully earnest rendition" of Harrison's song.

== Personnel ==
- George Harrison – lead vocals, acoustic guitars, slide guitar, backing vocals
- Nicky Hopkins – piano
- Gary Wright – electric piano, harpsichord
- Klaus Voormann – bass guitar
- Ringo Starr – drums
- Jim Keltner – drums, castanets

== Sources ==
- Allison, Dale C. Jr. (2006). The Love There That's Sleeping: The Art and Spirituality of George Harrison. New York, NY: Continuum. ISBN 978-0-8264-1917-0.
- Badman, Keith (2001). The Beatles Diary Volume 2: After the Break-Up 1970–2001. London: Omnibus Press. ISBN 978-0-7119-8307-6.
- Castleman, Harry; Podrazik, Walter J. (1976). All Together Now: The First Complete Beatles Discography 1961–1975. New York, NY: Ballantine Books. ISBN 0-345-25680-8.
- Clayson, Alan (2003). George Harrison. London: Sanctuary. ISBN 1-86074-489-3.
- Doggett, Peter (2011). You Never Give Me Your Money: The Beatles After the Breakup. New York, NY: It Books. ISBN 978-0-06-177418-8.
- The Editors of Rolling Stone (2002). Harrison. New York, NY: Rolling Stone Press. ISBN 978-0-7432-3581-5.
- Eliot, Marc (2010). Paul Simon: A Life. Hoboken, NJ: John Wiley & Sons. ISBN 978-0-470-43363-8.
- Giuliano, Geoffrey (1997). Dark Horse: The Life and Art of George Harrison. Da Capo Press. ISBN 978-0-306-80747-3.
- Greene, Joshua M. (2006). Here Comes the Sun: The Spiritual and Musical Journey of George Harrison. Hoboken, NJ: John Wiley & Sons. ISBN 978-0-470-12780-3.
- Harrison, George (2002). I, Me, Mine. San Francisco, CA: Chronicle Books. ISBN 978-0-8118-5900-4.
- Huntley, Elliot J. (2006). Mystical One: George Harrison – After the Break-up of the Beatles. Toronto, ON: Guernica Editions. ISBN 978-1-55071-197-4.
- Ingham, Chris (2006). The Rough Guide to the Beatles (2nd edn). London: Rough Guides/Penguin. ISBN 978-1-84836-525-4.
- Inglis, Ian (2010). The Words and Music of George Harrison. Santa Barbara, CA: Praeger. ISBN 978-0-313-37532-3.
- Jackson, Andrew Grant (2012). Still the Greatest: The Essential Solo Beatles Songs. Lanham, MD: Scarecrow Press. ISBN 978-0-8108-8222-5.
- Lavezzoli, Peter (2006). The Dawn of Indian Music in the West. New York, NY: Continuum. ISBN 0-8264-2819-3.
- Leng, Simon (2006). While My Guitar Gently Weeps: The Music of George Harrison. Milwaukee, WI: Hal Leonard. ISBN 978-1-4234-0609-9.
- Madinger, Chip; Easter, Mark (2000). Eight Arms to Hold You: The Solo Beatles Compendium. Chesterfield, MO: 44.1 Productions. ISBN 0-615-11724-4.
- Matovina, Dan (2000). Without You: The Tragic Story of Badfinger. Frances Glover Books. ISBN 0-9657122-2-2.
- O'Dell, Chris; with Katherine Ketcham (2009). Miss O'Dell: My Hard Days and Long Nights with The Beatles, The Stones, Bob Dylan, Eric Clapton, and the Women They Loved. New York, NY: Touchstone. ISBN 978-1-4165-9093-4.
- Rodriguez, Robert (2010). Fab Four FAQ 2.0: The Beatles' Solo Years, 1970–1980. Milwaukee, WI: Backbeat Books. ISBN 978-1-4165-9093-4.
- Romanowski, Patricia; George-Warren, Holly, eds. (1995). The New Rolling Stone Encyclopedia of Rock & Roll. New York, NY: Fireside/Rolling Stone Press. ISBN 0-684-81044-1.
- Schaffner, Nicholas (1978). The Beatles Forever. New York, NY: McGraw-Hill. ISBN 0-07-055087-5.
- Snow, Mat (2013). The Beatles Solo: The Illustrated Chronicles of John, Paul, George, and Ringo After The Beatles (Volume 3: George). New York, NY: Race Point Publishing. ISBN 978-1-937994-26-6.
- Spizer, Bruce (2005). The Beatles Solo on Apple Records. Orleans, LA: 498 Productions. ISBN 0-9662649-5-9.
- Tillery, Gary (2011). Working Class Mystic: A Spiritual Biography of George Harrison. Wheaton, IL: Quest Books. ISBN 978-0-8356-0900-5.
- Walker, Jeff (2011). Let's Put the Beatles Back Together Again 1970–2010. SomethingNow. ISBN 978-0-9867080-0-8.
- Williams, Richard (2003). Phil Spector: Out of His Head. London: Omnibus Press. ISBN 978-0-7119-9864-3.
- Woffinden, Bob (1981). The Beatles Apart. London: Proteus. ISBN 0-906071-89-5.
