= Material world =

Material world may refer to:

- All things of matter
- The physical world
  - Nature, the phenomena of the physical world, and life in general
- As a proper noun:
  - Material World (TV series), a Canadian television sitcom in the 1990s
  - Material World (radio programme), a BBC Radio 4 science programme
  - Material World: A Global Family Portrait, a 1994 photo essay by Peter Menzel

== See also ==
- Living in the Material World, a 1973 album by George Harrison
  - George Harrison: Living in the Material World, a 2011 documentary film directed by Martin Scorsese
  - Material World Charitable Foundation, a charitable organisation founded by Harrison to coincide with the album
- "Spirits in the Material World", a 1981 song by The Police
