= Who Can See It =

Song by George Harrison

from the album Living in the Material World
- Published: Material World Charitable Foundation (administered by Harrisongs)
- Released: 30 May 1973
- Genre: Rock
- Length: 3:52
- Label: Apple
- Songwriter(s): George Harrison
- Producer(s): George Harrison

"Who Can See It" is a song by English musician George Harrison, released on his 1973 album Living in the Material World. The lyrics reflect Harrison's uneasy feelings towards the Beatles' legacy, three years after the group's break-up, and serve as his statement of independence from expectations raised by the band's unprecedented popularity. Some music critics and biographers suggest that he wrote the song during a period of personal anguish, following the acclaim he had received as a solo artist with the 1970 triple album All Things Must Pass and his 1971–72 Bangladesh aid project. The revelatory nature of the lyrics has encouraged comparisons between Living in the Material World and John Lennon's primal therapy-inspired 1970 release, Plastic Ono Band.

A dramatic ballad in the Roy Orbison vein, the composition features unusual changes in time signature and a melody that incorporates musical tension. Harrison self-produced the recording, which includes heavy orchestration and a choir, both arranged by John Barham. Several commentators consider Harrison's vocal performance on "Who Can See It" to be among the finest of his career, while his production style has been likened to that of Beatles producer George Martin. The other musicians on the track are Nicky Hopkins, Klaus Voormann, Jim Keltner and Gary Wright.

Among reviews of the song, "Who Can See It" has been described variously as an "aching, yearning masterpiece" and an "unequivocal statement" on Harrison's identity. In line with his self-image as a musician, regardless of his past as a Beatle, Harrison included "Who Can See It" in the setlist for his 1974 North American tour with Ravi Shankar, the first tour there by a former Beatle since the band's break-up.

== Background and inspiration ==
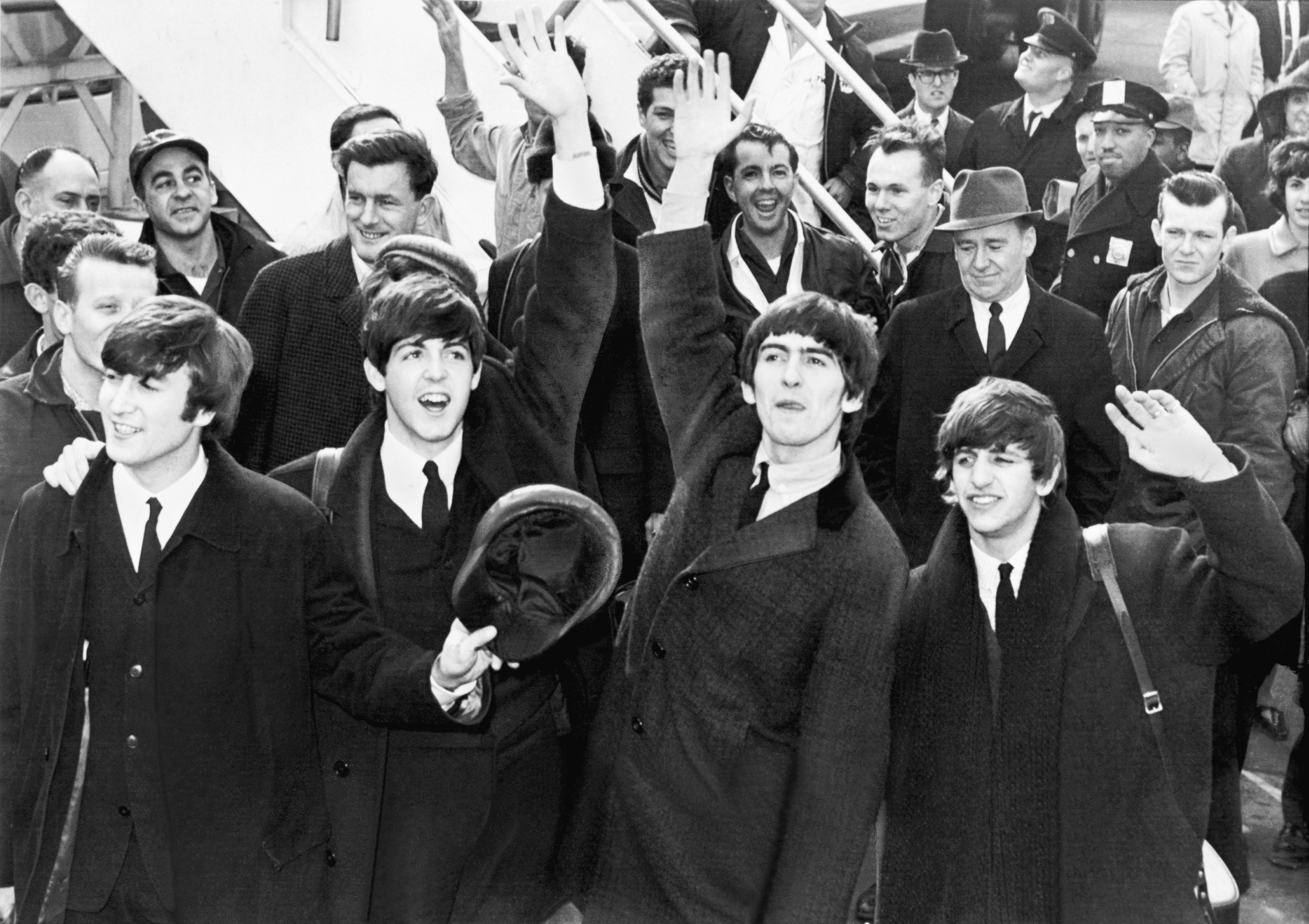
The Beatles (with Harrison third from left) in 1964, during the height of Beatlemania

As with the majority of the songs on his Living in the Material World album, George Harrison wrote "Who Can See It" over 1971–72. In his autobiography, I, Me, Mine, he makes light of the emotion behind the song, describing it as simply "a true story meaning 'Give us a break, squire'". Simon Leng, Harrison's musical biographer, recognises the song as a statement of considerable personal anguish, however. He writes of Harrison having been "deeply traumatized" by the effects of the Beatles' unprecedented popularity, and equally disoriented by his success as a solo artist following their break-up in April 1970. According to Leng, Harrison was in the same state of internal conflict over 1972–73 as John Lennon had been when writing the song "Help!" in 1965, during his self-styled "fat Elvis period". Music critic Stephen Holden highlighted a similar comparison between the two ex-Beatles in July 1973, when he deemed Living in the Material World to be "as personal and confessional" as Lennon's primal therapy-inspired Plastic Ono Band album (1970).

For me, "Beatle George" was a suit or a shirt that I once wore, and the only problem is, for the rest of my life, people are going to look at that shirt and mistake it for me.

– George Harrison to Q, 1995

During the Beatles' career, Harrison had been the first to tire of Beatlemania and the group's celebrity status, and he had written songs rejecting what Leng terms the "artifice" surrounding the band. (Note: Examples of such songs include "Art of Dying", a 1966 composition, and "Wah-Wah".) Lennon himself described the Beatles' predicament as "four individuals who eventually recovered their individualities after being submerged in a myth". In addition, for Harrison, while he began to match Lennon and Paul McCartney as a songwriter towards the end of the group's career, his relatively junior position in the Beatles was a source of frustration to him, which, according to music journalist Mikal Gilmore, left "deep and lasting wounds". (Note: An insecurity regarding his skills as a songwriter was one result. In addition, it took encouragement from Eric Clapton and others for Harrison to regain his confidence as a guitar player after years of enduring McCartney dictating how he should play. In the 1960s, Mojo contributor John Harris notes, Clapton was "among the first to suggest to George that The Beatles' set-up did not do his talent justice".)

Aside from being released from the psychological pressure of being a Beatle in 1970, Harrison was the one who potentially benefited the most from the group's break-up. His 1970 triple album, All Things Must Pass, was a major commercial and critical success, eclipsing releases by both Lennon and McCartney. According to author Ian Inglis, Harrison became "popular music's first statesman" as a result of both All Things Must Pass and his 1971–72 Bangladesh aid project. The last of these established humanitarianism as a new direction for rock music, in addition to focusing on Harrison the level of attention previously afforded the Beatles. While Leng describes "Who Can See It" as a "plea for understanding from a private man living his life in public", Inglis writes that, after the "euphoria" of his recent achievements as a solo artist, Harrison was forced to confront "some of the more unpleasant realities of his everyday life".

== Composition ==
"Who Can See It" is in the musical key of E. The melody incorporates various augmented and diminished chords, which Harrison describes in I, Me, Mine as "all kinds of suspended chords", since he played them in an open tuning on the guitar. The song starts with a solitary guitar figure and then builds in intensity through the verse and into the chorus, as musical tension matches the emotion of the lyrics.

Leng views "Who Can See It" as a "new type of ballad" from Harrison, one that combines a "dramatic edge" with rhythmic sophistication. The time signature shifts throughout the composition, from 4/4 to 6/4 and 5/8, with brief portions in 5/4 and 3/4. In Leng's description, the melody features "sweepingly large chromatic intervals", beginning with the verse's third line – a four-semitone swoop that recalls the ascending melismas commonly used in Indian music. Harrison later remarked, with reference to the boldness of the tune: "['Who Can See It'] reminds me of Roy Orbison for some reason. He could do this good."

Among the material Harrison wrote or finished for Living in the Material World, several songs reflect on his years with the Beatles, and in the case of "Who Can See It", with bitterness. In the opening verse, he states:

I've been held up
I've been run down
I can see quite clearly now through those past years
When I played toeing the line.

Inglis views these lines as a reference to Harrison's working-class upbringing as well as his years as a member of the Beatles. In the chorus that follows, Harrison contends that, having personally lived through these experiences, his sole wish is that his feelings "Should not be denied me now", and he concludes: "I can see my life belongs to me / My love belongs to who can see it." Inglis offers a simple précis of this statement: "he has paid his dues. Now he is his own man ..."

It's just that it wasn't as much fun for us in the end as it was for all of you.

– Harrison, on the weight of fans' expectations that helped bring about the Beatles' break-up, February 1979

In the song's second verse, Harrison sings of having "lived in fear" and witnessed the hatred created by "this sad world". While later discussing his aversion to performing live after 1966, Harrison presented a similar imagery, citing the Beatles' concerns regarding the threat of assassination. He also referred to the band's fame as "very one-sided", since the Beatles "gave their nervous systems" while receiving the adulation of their fans.

Leng finds the words to verse two typical of Harrison's tendency towards "internalization of world events" in some of his songs from this period, whereby "hate, conflict and strife" are projected onto the "wider world" in the likes of "Who Can See It" and "The Light That Has Lighted the World". Theologian Dale Allison views the mention of "this sad world" as a further reference to the essentially "tragic" nature of human existence, after "All Things Must Pass" and in anticipation of later Harrison songs such as "Stuck Inside a Cloud", in that "notwithstanding all the success and adulation", ultimately, "we are all alone". Allison writes of the message behind "Who Can See It": "Here he declares his freedom from his Beatle past, his freedom to be himself."

== Recording ==
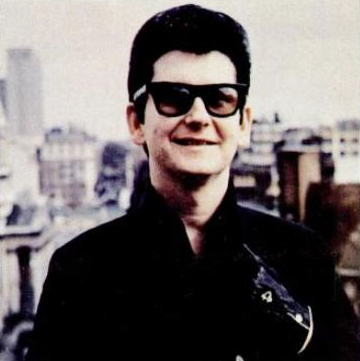
Roy Orbison, whose vocal style Harrison emulated on "Who Can See It"

Harrison had intended to co-produce his long-awaited follow-up to All Things Must Pass with Phil Spector, a mainstay of his career since 1970. Spector's unreliability meant that Harrison was forced to produce Living in the Material World alone – an outcome that music critics Greg Kot and Zeth Lundy find regrettable, in light of how Spector's signature Wall of Sound treatment might have suited ballads such as "Who Can See It" and "The Day the World Gets 'Round". Another regular Harrison collaborator, John Barham, provided orchestral arrangements as before, and noted an "austere quality" in some of the new songs. "George was under stress during Living in the Material World," Barham said later. "I felt that he was going through some kind of a crisis. I think it may have been spiritual, but I cannot be sure." (Note: Besides the Beatles, other issues that impacted on Harrison's songwriting during this period included his increased devotion to Vaishnavist Hinduism, particularly Krishna Consciousness, contrasting with his gradual estrangement from wife Pattie Boyd, and his despondency in response to the business and tax complications surrounding the Bangladesh relief project.)

Harrison taped the basic track for "Who Can See It" between October and December 1972, either at the Beatles' Apple Studio in London or at FPSHOT, his home studio in Henley, Oxfordshire. He recorded his vocals during the first two months of the new year, and Barham's orchestration and choir were added in late February.

I have this tendency to write sort of dramatic, or melodramatic, melodies ... There was a song on Material World that always makes me think it should be sung by someone like Al Jolson or Mario Lanza ...

– Harrison to Paul Gambaccini, September 1975

Harrison's twin electric-guitar parts recall the sound of the Beatles' Abbey Road album, through his use of a Leslie rotary effect – a detail that Leng finds significant, given the song's subject matter. In another Beatles comparison, music journalists Alan Clayson and John Metzger consider Harrison's production on Material World to be similar to George Martin's work with the band. Leng writes of "Who Can See It" having been "conceived with an Orbison vocal", and the singing duly reflects Orbison's more dramatic style. Harrison's vocal reaches falsetto in places, while, in Clayson's description, "swerving from muttered trepidation to strident intensity" during the course of the song. (Note: According to drummer Jim Keltner, Harrison had given up smoking and was "probably at his peak physically" when making the album.)

Aside from Harrison, the musicians on the recording include Nicky Hopkins (piano), Klaus Voormann (bass) and Jim Keltner (drums). As can be heard in the outtake of "Who Can See It" available unofficially on the Living in the Alternate World bootleg, Gary Wright's original contribution was a prominent harmonium part, superseded by Barham's strings and brass on the released version. Leng nevertheless credits Wright with playing organ on the song.

== Release and reception ==
Apple Records released Living in the Material World at the end of May 1973 in the United States and a month later in Britain. "Who Can See It" appeared as track 5 on side one of the LP format, in between what Leng terms the "perfect pop confection" "Don't Let Me Wait Too Long" and another song that referenced Harrison's Beatle past, "Living in the Material World". Reflecting the album's lyrical themes, Tom Wilkes's art design contrasted a devout spiritual existence with life in the material world, by featuring Hindu religious images such as a painting of Krishna and his warrior prince Arjuna, and a photograph of Harrison and his fellow musicians at a banquet, surrounded by symbols of material wealth and success.

The album confirmed Harrison's status as the most commercially successful ex-Beatle, but it drew criticism from some reviewers for the number of slow songs among its eleven tracks, as well as the perceived preachy tone of Harrison's lyrics. According to author Michael Frontani, lines such as "My life belongs to me" in "Who Can See It" "betrayed sentiments of a man increasingly at odds … with fans and critics who wanted him to be 'Beatle George,' or at least to be less fixated on his spirituality".

In his review for Rolling Stone, Stephen Holden wrote that, amid Material World's "miraculous ... radiance", the song represented "passionate testament" and "a beautiful ballad whose ascendant long-line melody is the most distinguished of the album". In Melody Maker, Michael Watts described Living in the Material World as "far, far removed from the Beatles" and "more interesting" lyrically than All Things Must Pass. Watts noted the "large autobiographical insights" provided in Harrison's songwriting, of which "Who Can See It" showed "he's found the way at last". Writing of Harrison's standing on an album he considered "as personal, in its own way, as anything that Lennon has done": Watts said: "Harrison has always struck me before as simply a writer of very classy pop songs; now he stands as something more than an entertainer. Now he's being honest." NME critic Bob Woffinden praised the song also, but suggested it was "ideal material" for someone with a wider vocal range than Harrison.

== Retrospective reviews ==
Some recent reviewers have been less enthusiastic, with PopMatters' Zeth Lundy opining that, rather than Harrison's more "stripped-down" production aesthetic, "Who Can See It" would have benefited from "the hyper-drama of All Things Must Pass' resonant abyss". Writing for Rolling Stone in 2002, Greg Kot similarly bemoaned the "hymn-like calm" of the performance and its falling short of the "transcendent heights" of Harrison's 1970 triple set.

Reviewing the 2006 reissue of Living in the Material World for Q magazine, Tom Doyle included it among the album's best three tracks and wrote: "the introspective moods of The Light That Has Lighted The World and Who Can See It, with their ornate instrumentation and weepy vocals, are lovely things." Former Mojo editor Mat Snow describes Material World as "a treat for the ears" and, while conceding Harrison's limitations as a singer compared with Lennon and McCartney, he writes that Harrison "worked hard to ensure the choruses of ... 'Who Can See It' caught the ear with their deep and delicious emotion". In his review of the 2014 reissue of Harrison's Apple catalogue, for Classic Rock, Paul Trynka refers to Material Word as an album that "sparkles with many gems"; of these, he adds, "it's the more restrained tracks – Don't Let Me Wait Too Long, Who Can See It – that entrance: gorgeous pop songs, all the more forceful for their restraint."

Among Beatles biographers, the Roy Orbison influence in "Who Can See It" is frequently noted, as is the fact that Harrison's lead vocal is one of the best of his career. In addition to admiring the album's disciplined, George Martin-like production, Alan Clayson has written of the "hitherto unprecedented audacity" of the vocals found throughout Material World, adding: "He may have lacked the Big O's operatic pitch, but 'Who Can See It' was among George's most magnificent performances on record. Veering cleanly into falsetto on other tracks, too, never had his pipes been so adept." Elliot Huntley describes "Who Can See It" as a "beautiful ballad" and an "aching, yearning masterpiece". In his chapter on George Harrison in the book The Dawn of Indian Music in the West, Peter Lavezzoli is another who highlights Harrison's singing on this "gorgeous Roy Orbison-esque ballad".

While praising a vocal that "positively bursts with passion", Leng identifies the song's "prevailing emotions" as "bitterness and anger" and notes: "If any Beatles fan was laboring under the misapprehension that George had enjoyed the [Beatles] episode as much as they had, this song tells the exact opposite story." Ian Inglis writes that the "rather ponderous" arrangement on "Who Can See It" limits its "entertainment" value but, like "The Light That Has Lighted the World", the song is an "unequivocal statement of who he is".

== Live performance ==
Why do they want to see if there is a Beatle George? I don't say I'm Beatle George ... If they want to [indulge in nostalgia], they can go and see Wings ... Why live in the past?

– Harrison to Rolling Stone, November 1974

In line with his stated refusal to play the role of "Beatle George" at the time, "Who Can See It" was among the songs rehearsed and played on Harrison's North American tour with Ravi Shankar in November–December 1974. Given the composition's "intensity of sentiment", Leng views it as a notable inclusion in the concert setlist. Harrison dropped the song in a program reshuffle following the opening show, however, due to his laryngitis-ravaged vocals cords being unable to carry such a demanding tune.

The tour was the first North American tour by an ex-Beatle, a fact that encouraged expectations from many critics and concert-goers that were at odds with Harrison's aim – which was to present a musically diverse show featuring a minimum of his Beatles-era songs. In an attempt to justify himself, Harrison took to quoting from the chorus of "Who Can See It" during interviews, as an example of Gandhi's advice to "create and preserve the image of your choice".

== Personnel ==
- George Harrison – vocals, electric guitars
- Nicky Hopkins – piano
- Gary Wright – organ
- Klaus Voormann – bass
- Jim Keltner – drums
- John Barham – string and brass arrangements, choral arrangement

== Sources ==
- Dale C. Allison Jr., The Love There That's Sleeping: The Art and Spirituality of George Harrison, Continuum (New York, NY, 2006; ISBN 978-0-8264-1917-0).
- Keith Badman, The Beatles Diary Volume 2: After the Break-Up 1970–2001, Omnibus Press (London, 2001; ISBN 0-7119-8307-0).
- The Beatles, Anthology, Chronicle Books (San Francisco, CA, 2000; ISBN 0-8118-2684-8).
- Harry Castleman & Walter J. Podrazik, All Together Now: The First Complete Beatles Discography 1961–1975, Ballantine Books (New York, NY, 1976; ISBN 0-345-25680-8).
- Alan Clayson, George Harrison, Sanctuary (London, 2003; ISBN 1-86074-489-3).
- Peter Doggett, You Never Give Me Your Money: The Beatles After the Breakup, It Books (New York, NY, 2011; ISBN 978-0-06-177418-8).
- The Editors of Rolling Stone, Harrison, Rolling Stone Press/Simon & Schuster (New York, NY, 2002; ISBN 0-7432-3581-9).
- Michael Frontani, "The Solo Years", in Kenneth Womack (ed.), The Cambridge Companion to the Beatles, Cambridge University Press (Cambridge, UK, 2009; ISBN 978-1-139-82806-2), pp. 153–82.
- Joshua M. Greene, Here Comes the Sun: The Spiritual and Musical Journey of George Harrison, John Wiley & Sons (Hoboken, NJ, 2006; ISBN 978-0-470-12780-3).
- George Harrison, I Me Mine, Chronicle Books (San Francisco, CA, 2002; ISBN 0-8118-3793-9).
- Mark Hertsgaard, A Day in the Life: The Music and Artistry of the Beatles, Pan Books (London, 1996; ISBN 0-330-33891-9).
- Elliot J. Huntley, Mystical One: George Harrison – After the Break-up of the Beatles, Guernica Editions (Toronto, ON, 2006; ISBN 1-55071-197-0).
- Ian Inglis, The Words and Music of George Harrison, Praeger (Santa Barbara, CA, 2010; ISBN 978-0-313-37532-3).
- Peter Lavezzoli, The Dawn of Indian Music in the West, Continuum (New York, NY, 2006; ISBN 0-8264-2819-3).
- Simon Leng, While My Guitar Gently Weeps: The Music of George Harrison, Hal Leonard (Milwaukee, WI, 2006; ISBN 1-4234-0609-5).
- Ian MacDonald, Revolution in the Head: The Beatles' Records and the Sixties, Pimlico (London, 1998; ISBN 0-7126-6697-4).
- Chip Madinger & Mark Easter, Eight Arms to Hold You: The Solo Beatles Compendium, 44.1 Productions (Chesterfield, MO, 2000; ISBN 0-615-11724-4).
- Chris O'Dell with Katherine Ketcham, Miss O'Dell: My Hard Days and Long Nights with The Beatles, The Stones, Bob Dylan, Eric Clapton, and the Women They Loved, Touchstone (New York, NY, 2009; ISBN 978-1-4165-9093-4).
- Robert Rodriguez, Fab Four FAQ 2.0: The Beatles' Solo Years, 1970–1980, Backbeat Books (Milwaukee, WI, 2010; ISBN 978-0-87930-968-8).
- Nicholas Schaffner, The Beatles Forever, McGraw-Hill (New York, NY, 1978; ISBN 0-07-055087-5).
- Mat Snow, The Beatles Solo: The Illustrated Chronicles of John, Paul, George, and Ringo After The Beatles (Volume 3: George), Race Point Publishing (New York, NY, 2013; ISBN 978-1-937994-26-6).
- Bruce Spizer, The Beatles Solo on Apple Records, 498 Productions (New Orleans, LA, 2005; ISBN 0-9662649-5-9).
- Gary Tillery, Working Class Mystic: A Spiritual Biography of George Harrison, Quest Books (Wheaton, IL, 2011; ISBN 978-0-8356-0900-5).
- Bob Woffinden, The Beatles Apart, Proteus (London, 1981; ISBN 0-906071-89-5).
