= Startling =

Startling may refer to:

- "Pandemic 2: The Startling", an episode of South Park
- Startling Stories, an American pulp science fiction magazine 1939-1955
- Startling Music, a record label founded by Ringo Starr
  - Startling Studios, a music recording studio at Tittenhurst Park

== See also ==
- Startle (disambiguation)
- Startling Odyssey a Japanese videogame
- "Startling! Frightening! Elekid!!", an episode of Pokémon: Battle Frontier
