= The Light That Has Lighted the World =

Song by George Harrison

from the album Living in the Material World
- Published: Material World Charitable Foundation (administered by Harrisongs)
- Released: 30 May 1973
- Recorded: 6 October 1972
- Genre: Folk rock
- Length: 3:31
- Label: Apple
- Songwriter: George Harrison
- Producer: George Harrison

"The Light That Has Lighted the World" is a song by English musician George Harrison released on his 1973 album Living in the Material World. It is viewed as a statement on Harrison's discomfort with the attention afforded him as an ex-Beatle and features a prominent contribution from English session pianist Nicky Hopkins, along with a highly regarded slide guitar solo from Harrison.

Around the time it was recorded, in late 1972, "The Light That Has Lighted the World" was rumoured to be the title track of the forthcoming album. Harrison originally intended it as a song for English singer Cilla Black, whose version of his 1970 composition "When Every Song Is Sung" he produced before starting work on Living in the Material World. An early acoustic demo of the song, a solo performance by Harrison, appeared as the closing track on the 2012 compilation Early Takes: Volume 1.

== Background and composition ==
In early August 1972, in between overseeing the UK release of Saul Swimmer's Concert for Bangladesh documentary and heading up to Liverpool to catch Ravi Shankar's recital at the Philharmonic Hall, George Harrison tried recording "When Every Song Is Sung", a ballad from the All Things Must Pass era, as a single for Cilla Black. Although the project was not completed, just like Harrison's attempt to record the same song with Ronnie Spector the year before, he later decided to write a B-side for her, which would become "The Light That Has Lighted the World". In his autobiography, I, Me, Mine, Harrison explains that the lyrics dealt with the "Local boy/girl makes good" phenomenon, where the public initially supports someone who achieves success yet are then disapproving if fame or success changes that person. Both he and Black were from Liverpool and had become famous quickly, after which many people considered their personalities had changed – a common link that Harrison thought of basing the intended B-side around. After he had come up with the opening two lines, however, the theme soon evolved into something more personal.

At the 27 July 1971 press conference preceding the Bangladesh concerts, Harrison had admitted he was "flattered" and "honour[ed]" to be receiving the same attention and acclaim once reserved for the Beatles. A year later, though, his words to "The Light That Has Lighted the World" were a plea for freedom from public scrutiny regarding his Beatle past, musical biographer Simon Leng writes, to allow him to "pursue his spiritual quest" unencumbered by the weight of others' expectations.

I've heard how some people have said that I've changed
That I'm not what I was, how it really is a shame
The thoughts in their heads manifest on their brow
Like bad scars from ill feeling they themselves arouse.

This negative scrutiny Harrison found "hateful to anyone that is happy or 'free' ", the lyrics continue, while he targets its purveyors as living "their lives without looking to see / The light that has lighted the world."

Harrison argues in I Me Mine that things can never stay the same – "the whole of life is a change: from the morning to the evening, from spring to winter ... from birth to death ..." This viewpoint is reflected in the song's second verse, where he bemoans those who make a point of resisting change, "As if nature itself, they'd prefer rearranged", because for them, "there's so little chance to experience soul". The song ends more optimistically, with his declaration:

I'm grateful to anyone that is happy or "free"
For giving me hope while I'm looking to see
The light that has lighted the world.

Instead of giving the track to Cilla Black, Harrison used it for his own album, Living in the Material World, recording for which began in October 1972.

While analysing the song's lyrics, Leng opines that, like "Who Can See It", "The Light That Has Lighted the World" betrays Harrison's tendency towards "internalization of world events", and the fact that he wrote these words while still in his twenties is a "testament to the sheer psychological pressure" of the Beatles experience and superstardom generally. At its core, Leng suggests, the song is asking: "What right do you have to inspect me, just because I made a few records?"

"He didn't like celebrity," Elton John observed of Harrison in a 2002 Rolling Stone Press tribute book. "I think he'd had enough by 1970 to last three lifetimes ... He found something worth more than fame, more than fortune, more than anything." In her introductory piece to the same publication, written two months after his death, Olivia Harrison quoted from the words to "The Light That Has Lighted the World" as an example of her late husband providing the "live background music to our lives": "If I played three chords on the uke (compulsory instrument in our home), he would be my band. George was so generous and 'grateful to anyone that is happy or free.' A good moment to him was always worth making better."

== Recording ==
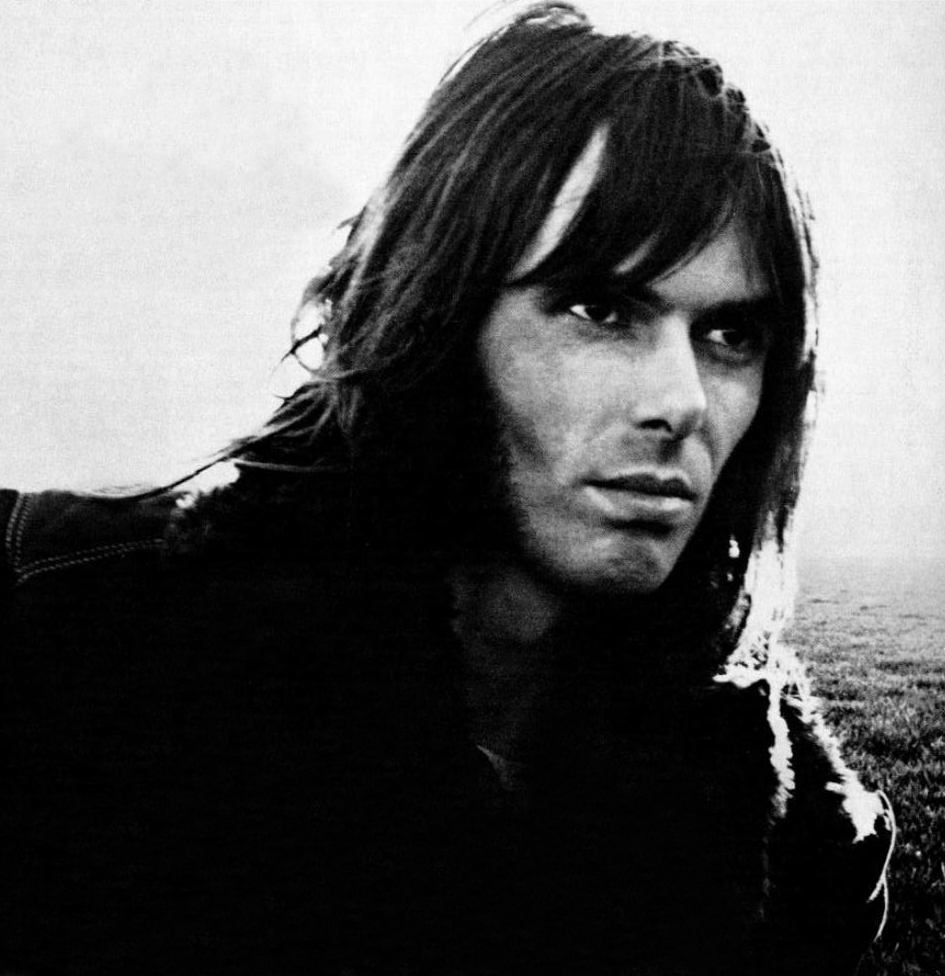
Pianist Nicky Hopkins (pictured in 1973), whose playing features prominently on "The Light That Has Lighted the World" and other songs from Material World

In a December 1971 interview for Disc and Music Echo, Nicky Hopkins – "the world's best-known anonymous pianist", as that magazine termed him – had talked of his plans to start work on his own solo album early the following year. "I'll probably be doing it with George Harrison," he said. "I'd really like to do that because, with George, I feel a very close thing ... We just seem to understand each other on a personal level so well." Like Harrison's long-awaited follow-up to All Things Must Pass, the Hopkins solo project was delayed by other commitments until the autumn of 1972, but the mutual understanding that Hopkins referred to was much in evidence on Living in the Material World; Leng describes the English keyboard player's contributions as "the most prominent instrumental voice" on the album aside from Harrison's distinctive slide guitar.

On "The Light That Has Lighted the World", the recording is underpinned by Gary Wright's stately harmonium and Harrison's acoustic rhythm guitars, and is dominated by Hopkins' piano. The instrumental section, in between the two verses, featuring first Hopkins and then Harrison, has received much positive comment. The track's solemn tempo has been likened to that for "Tears of Rage" and "I Shall Be Released" by the Band. An alternative studio version of the song, an outtake from the October–December 1972 album sessions, appears on the Living in the Alternate World bootleg. Featuring a more prominent and melodic harmonium part from Wright, and devoid of Harrison's overdubbed second and third acoustic-guitar parts and his electric slide guitar, this version of "The Light That Has Lighted the World" ends with an attractive vocal falsetto in place of the official release's bottleneck flourish.

== Release and reception ==
"The Light That Has Lighted the World" was issued in mid 1973 as the third track on Living in the Material World and is the first of a trio of slow-paced songs throughout the album that covers Harrison's preoccupation with breaking free from the past and others' perceptions (the second and third being "Who Can See It" and "Be Here Now"). Some months before this, the working title of the album was said to be The Light That Has Lighted the World. According to author Keith Badman, it was only in January 1973 that the name was changed to Living in the Material World. As with eight other tracks on the album and the 1973 B-side "Miss O'Dell", Harrison donated his publishing royalties and the copyright for "The Light That Has Lighted the World" to his Material World Charitable Foundation.

On release, the song was viewed as possessing both of the traits that some reviewers disliked about its parent album: too slow in tempo, and with lyrics "too smug for rock 'n' roll". Stephen Holden of Rolling Stone described it as "an oblique defense against public criticism and expectations of a Beatle reunion" and, the "sustained" instrumental break aside, "pretty leaden stuff" due to the funereal pace. NME critic Bob Woffinden found the music "exceptionally fine" and opined that the song "could rank with his best compositions". The problem, in Woffinden's opinion, was that, with the advent of glam rock in the UK while Harrison delayed following up on his 1970–71 solo success, "half the record-buying public" were more likely to view the song title as a reference to Gary Glitter.

Writing in Melody Maker, Michael Watts described the album as "Harrison's personal statement", documenting his journey towards "a spiritual goal which for the first time he has been able to define". Amid the "large autobiographical insights" offered in Harrison's new compositions, Watts wrote of "The Light That Has Lighted the World"'s role in the song cycle: "Until finally he climbed over the rocky patches and found his own Shangri-La, becoming transformed in the process."

== Retrospective appraisal ==
Writing for Rolling Stone in 2002, Greg Kot referred to the song's "condescending autobiographical vein", which he found echoed in Harrison's 1974 riposte to his detractors, "Dark Horse". To Bruce Eder of AllMusic, "The Light That Has Lighted the World" is one of the tracks on Material World that suffers from seeming "weighed down with their own sense of purpose, in ways that All Things Must Pass mostly (but not entirely) avoided". Similarly unimpressed, Eight Arms to Hold You authors Chip Madinger and Mark Easter write: "One would think that the 'light' might have given George a bit more happiness to reflect upon, but hey, the slide work's great!" The outtake available on the Alternate World bootleg, they add, was "believe it or not, even more lugubrious that the commercial version".

Beatles biographer Alan Clayson also compliments Harrison's slide-guitar work, writing of his "controlled grace" while "shining up the octaves" during the solo. Another biographer, Elliot Huntley, approves of the "grandiloquent ballad tone" of this and other songs on the album, and admires the "tasteful" rhythm section on "The Light That Has Lighted the World" and Harrison's "jangling" acoustic guitars. Having interviewed Harrison for Guitar World magazine in 1987, Rip Rense has likened the guitar solo to that on the Beatles' "Fixing a Hole", as examples of how Harrison's solos display "structure, syntax, and development" over "pyrotechnic flourishes". Rense adds: "These are thoughtful and original, deceptively simple sounding, invested with feeling." Writing for Goldmine in January 2002, Dave Thompson rated "The Light That Has Lighted the World" an "unquestioned highlight" and "a song hallmarked by distinct echoes of Lennon's Imagine".

In his review of the 2006 reissue of Living in the Material World, for Q magazine, Tom Doyle included the song among the album's best three tracks and wrote: "the introspective moods of The Light That Has Lighted The World and Who Can See It, with their ornate instrumentation and weepy vocals, are lovely things." Reviewing the 2014 Apple Years Harrison reissues, in Mojo, Doyle writes of Material World having "spotlit the spirituality and the dreaminess", through "the gentle, non-preachy The Light That Has Lighted The World and Be Here Now, both great works of look-around-you wonder". In his review for Record Collector, Oregano Rathbone highlights the song among Harrison's output over 1973–75, writing: "Living in the Material World, Dark Horse and Extra Texture may tend towards earnest, careworn, mid-tempo slow-burners, but each contains shivery moments of release: The Light That Has Lighted The World, Far East Man and This Guitar (Can't Keep From Crying) spring to mind."

Writing for the music website No Ripcord, Matt Bevington describes the composition as "perhaps his most revealing lyrical work and exemplary of his ability to convey with both charming humour and coarse honesty". Bevington adds: "it reads like a precious sermon ..."

Simon Leng considers the song "alarmingly direct" lyrically, and melodically strong, but, in the wider context of Harrison's career during the first half of the 1970s, he detects a "scalded-cat reaction" that would encourage critics to pounce on his next release, Dark Horse. Leng draws parallels with Joni Mitchell's "Ludwig's Song" and "Shadows and Light" – two tracks dealing with criticism and harsh judgement that duly attracted more of the same. Like Clayson and Holden, Leng views the mid-song soloing on "The Light That Has Lighted the World" as a highlight: "a rolling, lilting passage from Nicky Hopkins, topped by one of Harrison's finest performances," he writes. "In the closing bars of the statement, repeated as the song's coda, the guitar vocalizes a series of six-string sobs. George finally made his guitar gently weep." While echoing Leng's sentiments, Guitar World editor Damian Fanelli includes the slide soloing on his list of Harrison's best post-Beatles "Guitar Moments".

Unlike Leng, Ian Inglis views the lyrics as Harrison "[resisting] the temptation to criticize", since instead the unenlightened "have his sympathy". To Inglis, the song's weakness is that the "light" Harrison is striving to see is never made clear; whether it's love, spiritual enlightenment, or even the Beatles, "who, after all, have illuminated the world for many millions of people". The meaning is clear to theologian Dale Allison, who sums up "The Light That Has Lighted the World" as an "achingly beautiful" song that "expresses resentment toward those who dislike the ex-Beatle George but thanksgiving for those who reflect the light of God".

== Other versions ==
In Martin Scorsese's 2011 documentary George Harrison: Living in the Material World, the song is played over footage of the April 1970 announcement of the Beatles' break-up, following a clip of Harrison and Paul McCartney signing the "Beatles Agreement" legal papers in December 1974. A solo demo of "The Light That Has Lighted the World" (featuring Harrison on 12-string acoustic guitar) was included with the movie's deluxe-edition release on DVD, in November 2011. Six months later, this version was issued on the Early Takes: Volume 1 compilation.

In an interview with MusicRadar, compilation producer Giles Martin said that the unpolished aspect of Harrison's performance made him uncertain at first about whether to include the song on Early Takes. Martin continued: "It sounds like he's playing it to just one person late one evening, which is very George ... It's a little bit special; it shows how George could make something simple sound very spiritual, almost dreamy in a way ... I think this works beautifully as a closer." In his review for No Ripcord, Bevington writes: "in such a graceful recording there is a profound message which cuts even deeper to something [Harrison] quite obviously understood, yet most never will."

"The Light That Has Lighted the World" was covered by Japanese band Grapevine, featuring guest vocalist Maika Shiratori (daughter of Emiko Shiratori), on the Gentle Guitar Dreams Harrison tribute album, released in May 2002.

== Personnel ==
- George Harrison – lead vocals, acoustic guitars, slide guitar, backing vocals
- Nicky Hopkins – piano
- Gary Wright – harmonium
- Klaus Voormann – bass guitar
- Jim Keltner – drums

== Sources ==
- Dale C. Allison Jr., The Love There That's Sleeping: The Art and Spirituality of George Harrison, Continuum (New York, NY, 2006; ISBN 978-0-8264-1917-0).
- Keith Badman, The Beatles Diary Volume 2: After the Break-Up 1970–2001, Omnibus Press (London, 2001; ISBN 0-7119-8307-0).
- Harry Castleman & Walter J. Podrazik, All Together Now: The First Complete Beatles Discography 1961–1975, Ballantine Books (New York, NY, 1976; ISBN 0-345-25680-8).
- Alan Clayson, George Harrison, Sanctuary (London, 2003; ISBN 1-86074-489-3).
- The Editors of Rolling Stone, Harrison, Rolling Stone Press/Simon & Schuster (New York, NY, 2002; ISBN 0-7432-3581-9).
- George Harrison, I Me Mine, Chronicle Books (San Francisco, CA, 2002; ISBN 0-8118-3793-9).
- Elliot J. Huntley, Mystical One: George Harrison – After the Break-up of the Beatles, Guernica Editions (Toronto, ON, 2006; ISBN 1-55071-197-0).
- Ian Inglis, The Words and Music of George Harrison, Praeger (Santa Barbara, CA, 2010; ISBN 978-0-313-37532-3).
- Peter Lavezzoli, The Dawn of Indian Music in the West, Continuum (New York, NY, 2006; ISBN 0-8264-2819-3).
- Simon Leng, While My Guitar Gently Weeps: The Music of George Harrison, Hal Leonard (Milwaukee, WI, 2006; ISBN 1-4234-0609-5).
- Chip Madinger & Mark Easter, Eight Arms to Hold You: The Solo Beatles Compendium, 44.1 Productions (Chesterfield, MO, 2000; ISBN 0-615-11724-4).
- Jörg Pieper, The Solo Beatles Film & TV Chronicle 1971–1980, lulu.com (2012; ISBN 978-1-4092-8301-0).
- Nicholas Schaffner, The Beatles Forever, McGraw-Hill (New York, NY, 1978; ISBN 0-07-055087-5).
- Bruce Spizer, The Beatles Solo on Apple Records, 498 Productions (New Orleans, LA, 2005; ISBN 0-9662649-5-9).
- Bob Woffinden, The Beatles Apart, Proteus (London, 1981; ISBN 0-906071-89-5).
