= The Day the World Gets 'Round =

Song by George Harrison

from the album Living in the Material World
- Published: Material World Charitable Foundation (administered by Harrisongs)
- Released: 30 May 1973
- Recorded: 4 October 1972
- Genre: Folk rock
- Length: 2:53
- Label: Apple
- Songwriter: George Harrison
- Producer: George Harrison

"The Day the World Gets 'Round" is a song by the English musician George Harrison, released on his 1973 album Living in the Material World. Harrison was inspired to write the song following the successful Concert for Bangladesh shows, which were held in New York on 1 August 1971 as a benefit for refugees from the country formerly known as East Pakistan. The lyrics reflect his disappointment that such a humanitarian aid project was necessary, given the abundance of resources available across the planet, and his belief that if all individuals were more spiritually aware, there would be no suffering in the world. Adding to Harrison's frustration while writing the song, the aid project became embroiled in financial problems, as commercial concerns delayed the release of the Concert for Bangladesh album, and government tax departments failed to embrace the goodwill inherent in the venture.

Harrison recorded "The Day the World Gets 'Round" in England between October 1972 and March 1973. The recording features an orchestral arrangement by John Barham and a similarly well-regarded vocal performance from Harrison. The other contributing musicians were Nicky Hopkins, Klaus Voormann, Ringo Starr and Jim Keltner. Reviewers have described the composition variously as a protest song, a devotional prayer, and a counterpart to John Lennon's peace anthem "Imagine".

As with all the new songs released on Living in the Material World, Harrison donated his publishing royalties from the track to the Material World Charitable Foundation, an organisation he set up to avoid the tax problems that had befallen his Bangladesh relief effort. The song typifies Harrison's ideal for a world unencumbered by national, religious or cultural delineation. In 2009, Voormann and Yusuf Islam covered "The Day the World Gets 'Round" and released it as a single to benefit children in war-torn Gaza.

== Background ==
In his 1980 autobiography, I, Me, Mine, George Harrison describes the period following the two Concert for Bangladesh shows as "very emotional". The concerts took place at Madison Square Garden, New York, on 1 August 1971, as the first part of his fundraising program for the 8–10 million refugees of the Bangladesh Liberation War. The generosity of all the participants, together with the response from the general public, encouraged Harrison to feel "very positive about certain things". At the same time, the fact that it had fallen to musicians such as himself and concert instigator Ravi Shankar to address the issue left Harrison "slightly enraged", given the wealth of resources available to governments around the globe. Author Gary Tillery writes that, through his humanitarian gesture, Harrison had "changed the perception" of rock musicians, "making it clear they could be good world citizens too", while music critic Mikal Gilmore has noted of Harrison's "cautious yet optimistic and tender" worldview: "[it] stood in stark contrast to the ugly dissolution of the Beatles and the defeated idealism that then characterised so much of rock & roll culture." The day after the Madison Square Garden concerts, Harrison began writing the song "The Day the World Gets 'Round", having stayed in New York to work with producer Phil Spector on the proposed live album of the event.

=== The Concert for Bangladesh album release ===
Harrison found frustration in this next phase of the Bangladesh project, as the various record companies associated with the concerts' performers attempted to profit from the forthcoming release. Chief among these was the Beatles' US distributor, Capitol Records, who delayed issuing the album in the hope of negotiating a royalty rate to cover what they perceived as high distribution costs for the boxed three-record set. Harrison was resolute that Capitol should absorb the costs, just as the Beatles' Apple record label had already paid for the album's lavish packaging and full-colour booklet. All those involved with the concerts and post-production on the live album had given their services for free, in keeping with Harrison's hope that, in Tillery's words: "Every penny of income – from the gate receipts to the profits from an album and a film – would go toward alleviating the suffering."

By early October 1971, bootleg recordings of the concerts were available in New York, potentially denying funds to the refugees. On 23 November, Harrison's exasperation with the situation saw him raging against Capitol president Bhaskar Menon during a late-night television interview with Dick Cavett, and threatening to take the album to a rival label. Menon then backed down, ceding much of the distribution rights to Columbia/CBS, whose artist Bob Dylan had made a successful comeback at the Concert for Bangladesh. Further delaying the release until well into December, wholesalers objected to Apple's financial terms, which ensured that wholesalers and retailers could make little profit on each copy shipped. Ignoring the spirit behind the release, author Peter Lavezzoli writes, some US retailers "engaged in shameless price gouging".

=== Legal and taxation issues ===
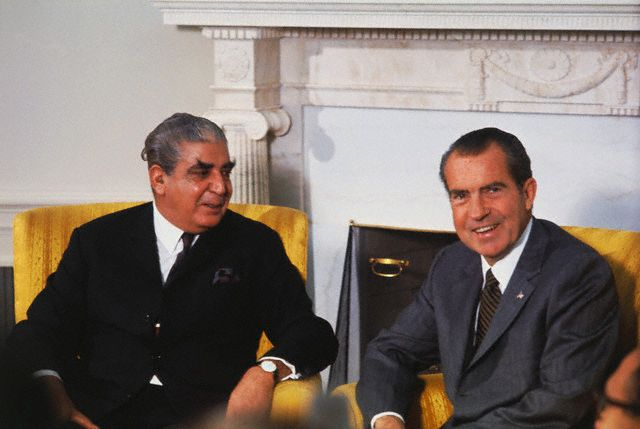
The Nixon administration supported Pakistani president Yahya Khan (left) during the Bangladesh Liberation War.

Of greater detriment to the project in the long term, Harrison's business manager, Allen Klein, had neglected to register the concerts as UNICEF fundraising benefits before they had taken place. As a result, the American and British tax departments were demanding a share of the proceeds from the live album and Saul Swimmer's concert film, ignoring Harrison's appeals that an exception be made in the case of this humanitarian disaster. Until India's defeat of Pakistan on 16 December, America continued to supply arms and financial aid to the Pakistani army, led by General Yahya Khan, despite reports of genocide being committed against the Bangladeshis. In reply to a New Yorker's offer to start a petition to make the US Treasury scrap its tax on the Concert for Bangladesh album, Harrison wrote: "Until the [politicians] become human, we must do our service to others without their help." (Note: According to author Alan Clayson, Harrison, "as the representative of common folk", considered "riding roughshod over official interference by travelling personally to India", in order to ensure that the funds were dispersed correctly.)

Although Rolling Stone and other countercultural publications lauded the Bangladesh concerts as proof that "the Utopian spirit of the Sixties was still flickering", in the words of author Nicholas Schaffner, Harrison addressed, in "The Day the World Gets 'Round", the corporate greed and governmental apathy he had encountered. While staging the concerts Harrison had made a point of distancing himself from the politics behind the war in what was formerly known as East Pakistan, and he similarly advocated peace activist Swami Vishnudevananda's proposal for Planet Earth passports – whereby "[one truth] underlies all nations, all cultures, all colours, all races, all religions". Referring to the song and the moral responsibility of wealthy Western nations, he says in I, Me, Mine: "If everyone would wake-up and do even a little, there could be no misery in the world."

== Composition ==
Let's face it, the whole problem and how to solve it lies within the power of the governments and world leaders. They have resources, food, money and wealth enough for twice our world's population, yet they choose to squander it on weapons and other objects that destroy mankind. It seems to me to be a poor state of affairs when "pop stars" are required to set an example ...

— George Harrison, 1979

Author Robert Rodriguez describes "The Day the World Gets 'Round" as both "an expression of gratitude to all the good hearts that had contributed to the success [of the Bangladesh benefits]", and a "stinging indictment" of governments who had the power to help but instead "turned their backs when it suited their ends to do so". Harrison musical biographer Simon Leng notes also Harrison's dismay at how the 1960s countercultural revolution had failed to influence the motivations of the music business – to the extent that the altruism behind the Concert for Bangladesh "was almost torpedoed by boardroom balance sheets".

A slow-paced ballad, the song's opening verse reflects Harrison's optimism and idealism, on the one hand:

The day the world gets 'round
To understanding where it is
Using all it's found
To help each other, hand in hand.

His frustration is evident from verse two, where, in what Leng terms a "knee-jerk reaction" to the politics behind the Bangladesh crisis, Harrison sings of a world "Losing so much ground / Killing each other, hand in hand".

In the song's middle eight, Leng suggests, Harrison identifies the absence of humility as the root of humankind's problems, and concludes:

I look for the pure of heart
And the ones who have made a start
But Lord, there are just a few
Who bow before you ...

These lines have led to conflicting interpretations among Harrison biographers regarding a supposedly superior attitude on the singer's part. Ian Inglis writes of "an increasingly familiar elitism in his apparent perception of himself", adding: "When [Harrison] sings of 'the pure of heart' and tells the Lord that 'there are just a few who bow before you,' the implied conclusion is that he counts himself among their number." While acknowledging the ambiguity of this message, Leng writes: "This could be taken as Harrison's statement of his own spiritual superiority, or it might be his metaphor for a rejection of conceit. If ego-driven politicians and self-serving military leaders were able to bow before anything, even a 'concept' like God, the world would be a better place. 'The Day the World Gets 'Round' laments human nature and calls for a little humility."

As soon as we can all have Planet Earth passports I'll be grateful, because I'm tired of being British or being white, or being a Christian or a Hindu. I don't have a philosophy, I just believe in the sap that runs throughout.

— Harrison's vision for a global community free of national and racial boundaries, UNICEF press conference, 1974

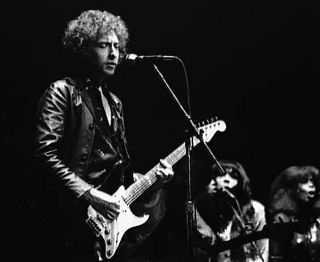
Commentators draw comparisons between "The Day the World Gets 'Round" and the work of Bob Dylan, pictured on stage in 1980, during his born-again Christian period.

Dale Allison, a Christian theologian, views these lyrics as a song-wide message where Harrison "mourns how few are working for a better world and paying homage to God". Allison refutes the idea of any elitism or superiority in Harrison's compositions, suggesting: "George nowhere claims to have arrived [at his spiritual goal]; he is rather always a pilgrim, always on the road. In the words of 'The Day the World Gets 'Round,' he is one of those who has 'made a start,' nothing more."

The same three biographers comment on the comparisons between Harrison and Dylan that were encouraged by this and other Harrison songs from 1971 to 1973, during a period when, author Peter Doggett writes, the ex-Beatle was "arguably music's most influential figure". Leng views Harrison's call for humility in "The Day the World Gets 'Round" as "identical to the thrust" of Dylan's "Masters of War", a protest song written about the 1962–63 Cold War arms race. Inglis suggests that whereas Dylan adopts the more analytical approach of an observer in his politically themed songs, Harrison "appears as a campaigner who is there to convert"; his words duly carry "a suggestion of self-satisfaction", Inglis opines, while also remarking on the "overall pessimism" of "The Day the World Gets 'Round". Allison contrasts the song with "Slow Train Coming", a lyrically uncompromising Dylan composition reflecting the American singer's late-1970s conversion to born-again Christianity, and cites "The Day the World Gets 'Round" as an example of how Harrison's worldview instead "entails a happy ending". (Note: Leng finds more common ground between the two songwriters in the Slow Train Coming track "Gotta Serve Somebody", in which Dylan's refrain echoes the message of Harrison's lines "But Lord, there are just a few / Who bow before you ...")

== Recording ==
Speaking in February 1977, Harrison told BBC Radio's Anne Nightingale that the Bangladesh relief project took "two years solid" of his life. Doggett describes 1972 as a year of "recuperation and retreat" for the ex-Beatle, interspersed with meetings "to determine which department of which government was now stalling the funds so desperately needed in the newly independent nation". Harrison received UNICEF's "Child Is the Father of Man" award in New York on 5 June 1972 and then oversaw the delayed British release of the Concert for Bangladesh film on 27 July, after which he was able to dedicate himself to working on the long-awaited follow-up to his 1970 triple album, All Things Must Pass.

Sessions for Living in the Material World took place at Apple Studio in central London and at Harrison's Friar Park studio, FPSHOT, beginning in October 1972. Despite his original intention to co-produce with Phil Spector as before, Harrison was sole producer throughout the sessions, with Phil McDonald again serving as recording engineer. While Harrison succeeded in paring down the album's production after the Wall of Sound excesses of All Things Must Pass, commentators note that he incorporated aspects of Spector's signature style on this and other songs on Material World, through the use of orchestral strings and brass, a choir and multiple drummers.

On the basic track for "The Day the World Gets 'Round", Harrison used the same rhythm section that had supported him at the Concert for Bangladesh – bassist Klaus Voormann and drummers Ringo Starr and Jim Keltner – along with keyboard players Nicky Hopkins and Gary Wright. The latter's contribution, on harmonium, is prominent on the take available unofficially on Living in the Alternate World, a bootleg compilation containing pre-overdubbed versions of the officially released songs, but was subsequently superseded by John Barham's orchestral arrangements.

As an example of a more subtle production aesthetic compared with Spector's, Harrison "gave the tunes breathing space, allowing the instruments to sparkle", Rodriguez writes. His chiming acoustic-guitar harmonics sound out alone during the occasions when the words "The day the world gets 'round" are sung. Inglis describes Barham's string arrangement on the recording as "almost identical" to that on John Lennon's Beatles composition "Across the Universe", and other reviewers have similarly likened "The Day the World Gets 'Round" to that song, and to the All Things Must Pass tracks "Isn't It a Pity" and "Beware of Darkness". Along with Harrison's vocal parts, the overdubs for Barham's contributions took place in London during the first two months of 1973. Mixing on the album was completed by the start of March, shortly before the Concert for Bangladesh won the Grammy Award for best album of 1972.

== Material World Charitable Foundation ==
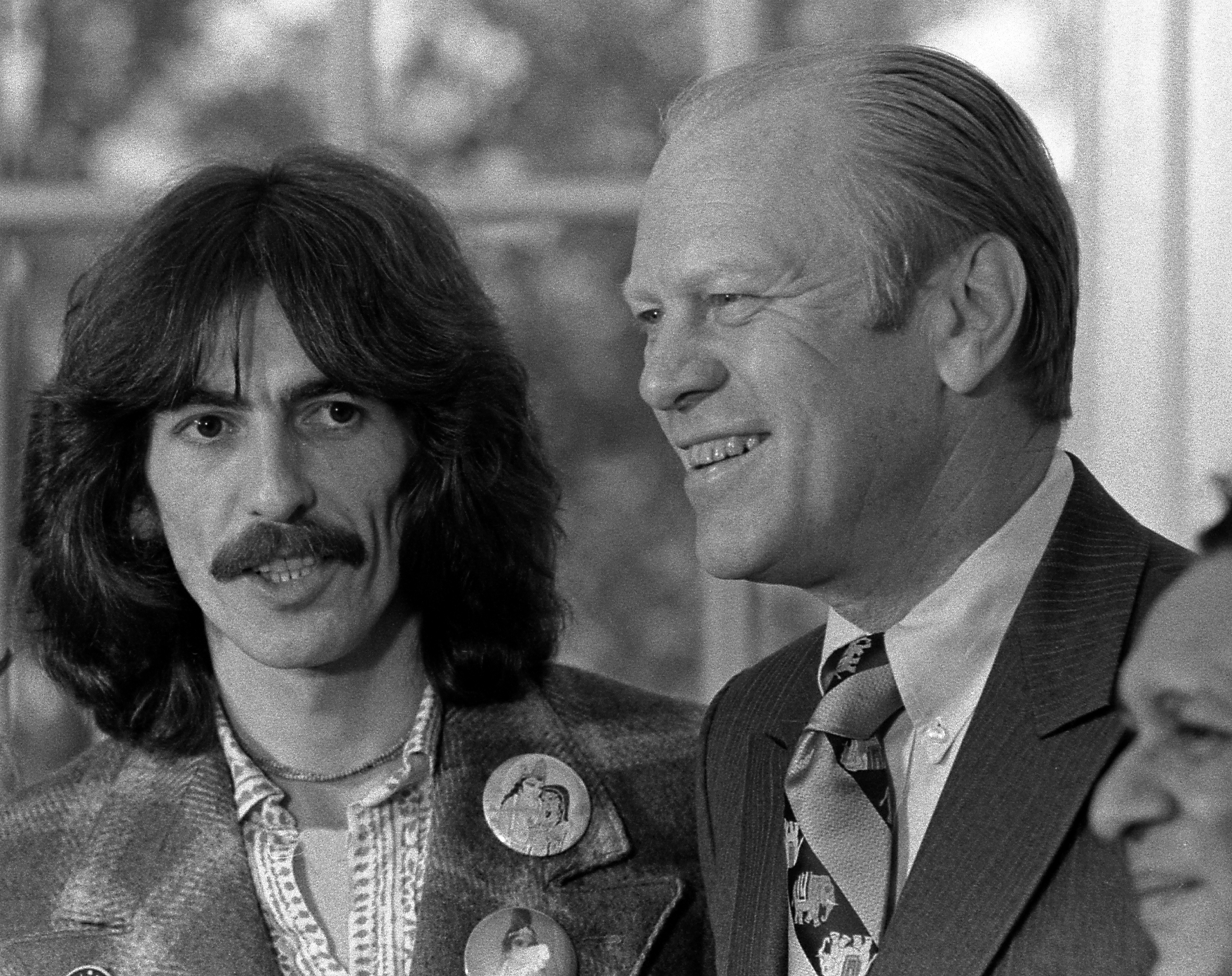
Harrison, President Ford and Shankar at the White House in December 1974

On 26 April 1973, Harrison set up the Material World Charitable Foundation, to which he donated the publishing royalties from "The Day the World Gets 'Round" and eight other songs on Living in the Material World. (Note: The remaining songs on the album, "Sue Me, Sue You Blues" and "Try Some, Buy Some", had been given to other artists before Harrison came to record his own versions. Publishing for these two compositions was already registered with Harrison's company Harrisongs, which served as administrator for the royalties from the nine songs assigned to the Material World Charitable Foundation.) Part of the foundation's mission was to "encourage the exploration of alternative life views and philosophies" and "[support] established charitable organizations with consideration to those with special needs" – so allowing Harrison to donate money without encountering the problems that had hampered the Bangladesh aid project. In his 2009 book You Never Give Me Your Money, Doggett writes that the foundation "continues to fund worthy causes to this day". (Note: In another example of Harrison's humanitarian legacy, the George Harrison Fund for UNICEF, set up in 2005 with the reissue of the Concert for Bangladesh album and film, raised over $1.2 million in 2011 for children in famine- and drought-stricken areas of the Horn of Africa.)

The first event sponsored by the Material World Charitable Foundation was Ravi Shankar's Music Festival from India, in September–October 1974, following which Harrison and Shankar toured North America together. During their stopover in Washington, DC, Harrison used his audience with US president Gerald Ford to ask for presidential intercession into the ongoing IRS audit that was still holding the Bangladesh fund's US proceeds in escrow. (Note: The British Government, whose Treasury representative had insisted in 1971 that Britain needed the tax revenue as much as Bangladesh, received a personal cheque from Harrison for £1 million in July 1973. With this payment, the issue of UK tax liability was "considered closed", according to Rodriguez.)

== Release ==
Apple Records released Living in the Material World in late May 1973, with "The Day the World Gets 'Round" appearing as the penultimate track. Reflecting the album content, Tom Wilkes's design for the LP's face labels contrasted a devout spiritual existence with life in the material world, by featuring a painting of the Hindu god Krishna and his warrior prince Arjuna on side one, and a picture of a Mercedes stretch limousine on the reverse. The latter image was a detail taken from Ken Marcus's inner gatefold photograph, which depicted Harrison and his fellow musicians at a Last Supper-style banquet. The album was a commercial success, topping America's Billboard 200 chart for five weeks, thus ensuring the Material World Charitable Foundation a considerable injection of funds.

The release reflected Harrison's continued belief in the power of music to instigate change in the world, an ideal that distinguished Material World as the last of "rock's grand statements", Leng suggests, and "the final fading of the 1960s dream into middle-age contentment and fiscal luxury". Author and former Mojo editor Mat Snow writes of the timing of the album's US release: "he caught a public mood that craved an echo of 1960s idealism as America was gripped by the cynicism revealed in the Watergate hearings."

== Reception ==
In a highly favourable review in Rolling Stone magazine, Stephen Holden described Living in the Material World as "inspirationally, opulently, romantic" and referred to "The Day the World Gets 'Round" as a "devotional prayer" that, combined with the album-closing "That Is All", left the listener "suspended in ethereality". Decades later, Bruce Eder of AllMusic was likewise impressed, writing that Harrison's singing "soars magnificently in his heartfelt performance".

While Holden admired Harrison's lyrics for imparting "an extraordinary sincerity that transcends questions of craftsmanship", other reviewers bristled at the apparent preachiness in songs such as "The Day the World Gets 'Round". Peter Doggett has commented on the impression left among music critics: "the prevailing tone of the record was moral disapproval, never an attractive quality in a popular singer."

In his 1996 biography on the ex-Beatle, Alan Clayson praised Harrison's vocal performance on a song that, although "naive", "smouldered from the angered question of why a mere pop star rather than a governing body was obliged to pinpoint iniquities", Clayson adding that "never had his pipes been so adept" as on Material World. To Greg Kot, writing in Rolling Stone's posthumous tribute to Harrison, "The Day the World Gets 'Round" and the ballad "Who Can See It" "aspire to a hymnlike calm but never rise to the transcendent heights of [All Things Must Pass]". Writing for Blogcritics, Seattle-based music critic Chaz Lipp views the production on Material World as "meticulous" and superior to its predecessor, such that "[t]he delicate melodies of songs like 'The Day the World Gets 'Round' and 'Be Here Now' are never lost in bombast." In his review of the 2006-remastered album, for Mojo magazine, Mat Snow wrote of "this long overdue reissue" being "worth it alone for four wonderful songs", one of which was "The Day the World Gets 'Round". More recently, Snow has praised the song for its "deep and delicious emotion" and comments that through the idealism Harrison expressed on Living in the Material World, he was "without qualification, perhaps more loved and respected as a human being".

In Simon Leng's opinion, the track is "a classic 1960s protest song" – Harrison's reaction to the failure of that decade's social revolution to create any meaningful change. While comparing the song to Dylan's "epoch-making 'Masters of War'", Leng notes that the "political essence" of "The Day the World Gets 'Round" is often overlooked due to the lyrics' "framework of spiritual redemption". Dale Allison similarly labels it "a passionate protest song of deep disillusionment", reflecting "the broken utopian dreams of the 1960s". Allison groups "The Day the World Gets 'Round" with "Bangla Desh" and "Far East Man" as obvious examples of Harrison's "humanitarian impulse, his concern for the world and its people".

Elliot Huntley views the song as a "strong candidate" for the album's best track, thanks to its "stunning structure and melody twists". Barham's orchestration complements the message "perfectly", according to Huntley, who praises also the middle eight, where Harrison "lets rip with his vocals". Less impressed with the composition, Ian Inglis acknowledges the importance of Barham's contribution – the ascending string arrangement being "the most startling facet" of the song musically. Robert Rodriguez describes the track as an "earnest counterpart" to Lennon's song "Imagine".

== Yusuf & Klaus's version ==
Artwork for 2009 single by Yusuf & Klaus

An avowed fan of the Material World album, and a vocal supporter of Harrison's humanitarian legacy, Klaus Voormann had established himself as an in-demand session musician during the late 1960s and throughout the 1970s before recording his first solo album in 2008. Titled A Sideman's Journey, it included cover versions of Harrison's "The Day the World Gets 'Round" and "All Things Must Pass", both recorded in London with singer Yusuf Islam and credited to Yusuf & Klaus. Islam said that he came across the song while looking through albums by Harrison, whom he described as being "more responsible than any other artist for initiating Pop music's movement to aid people and countries stricken by wars and calamities". Besides Voormann and Islam, the musicians on the recording include Luke Potashnick and Cassiano De Sa (guitars), Nikolaj Torp (keyboards) and Kristoffer Soone (drums).

It's a beautiful plea for peace and understanding ... The song speaks of the split nature of this world: comparing the love and joy of sharing what we all have on this earth, with the "foolishness in man" and his quest for more, thus causing war and loss in the process.

— Yusuf Islam, 2009

In January 2009, Voormann issued "The Day the World Gets 'Round" as an advance single from the album. Proceeds from the single were donated to the United Nations Relief and Works Agency (UNRWA) and Save the Children, to alleviate the suffering in war-torn Gaza. To serve as artwork for the release, Voormann incorporated part of his Grammy Award-winning design for the Beatles' Revolver album (1966), combining the image of Harrison from that album cover with a similar-styled drawing of Islam and a 1966-era photo of himself.

In a press release to announce the single, Yusuf Islam wrote of "The Day the World Gets 'Round": "This song represents for me the great spirit of George Harrison. I hope this song will help remind people of the immense legacy of love, peace and happiness we can share when we get round to looking at mankind's futile wars and prejudices, and start to change our foolish ways."

== Personnel ==
The following musicians played on Harrison's recording of the song:

- George Harrison – lead vocals, twelve-string acoustic guitar, backing vocals
- Nicky Hopkins – piano
- Klaus Voormann – bass guitar
- Ringo Starr – drums
- Jim Keltner – drums
- John Barham – string arrangements, brass arrangements, choral arrangement

== Sources ==
- Dale C. Allison Jr., The Love There That's Sleeping: The Art and Spirituality of George Harrison, Continuum (New York, NY, 2006; ISBN 978-0-8264-1917-0).
- Keith Badman, The Beatles Diary Volume 2: After the Break-Up 1970–2001, Omnibus Press (London, 2001; ISBN 0-7119-8307-0).
- Harry Castleman & Walter J. Podrazik, All Together Now: The First Complete Beatles Discography 1961–1975, Ballantine Books (New York, NY, 1976; ISBN 0-345-25680-8).
- Alan Clayson, George Harrison, Sanctuary (London, 2003; ISBN 1-86074-489-3).
- Peter Doggett, You Never Give Me Your Money: The Beatles After the Breakup, It Books (New York, NY, 2011; ISBN 978-0-06-177418-8).
- The Editors of Rolling Stone, Harrison, Rolling Stone Press/Simon & Schuster (New York, NY, 2002; ISBN 0-7432-3581-9).
- Joshua M. Greene, Here Comes the Sun: The Spiritual and Musical Journey of George Harrison, John Wiley & Sons (Hoboken, NJ, 2006; ISBN 978-0-470-12780-3).
- George Harrison, I Me Mine, Chronicle Books (San Francisco, CA, 2002; ISBN 0-8118-3793-9).
- Olivia Harrison, George Harrison: Living in the Material World, Abrams (New York, NY, 2011; ISBN 978-1-4197-0220-4).
- Elliot J. Huntley, Mystical One: George Harrison – After the Break-up of the Beatles, Guernica Editions (Toronto, ON, 2006; ISBN 1-55071-197-0).
- Chris Ingham, The Rough Guide to the Beatles, Rough Guides/Penguin (London, 2006; 2nd edn; ISBN 978-1-84836-525-4).
- Ian Inglis, The Words and Music of George Harrison, Praeger (Santa Barbara, CA, 2010; ISBN 978-0-313-37532-3).
- Peter Lavezzoli, The Dawn of Indian Music in the West, Continuum (New York, NY, 2006; ISBN 0-8264-2819-3).
- Simon Leng, While My Guitar Gently Weeps: The Music of George Harrison, Hal Leonard (Milwaukee, WI, 2006; ISBN 1-4234-0609-5).
- Chip Madinger & Mark Easter, Eight Arms to Hold You: The Solo Beatles Compendium, 44.1 Productions (Chesterfield, MO, 2000; ISBN 0-615-11724-4).
- Robert Rodriguez, Fab Four FAQ 2.0: The Beatles' Solo Years, 1970–1980, Backbeat Books (Milwaukee, WI, 2010; ISBN 978-1-4165-9093-4).
- Nicholas Schaffner, The Beatles Forever, McGraw-Hill (New York, NY, 1978; ISBN 0-07-055087-5).
- Mat Snow, The Beatles Solo: The Illustrated Chronicles of John, Paul, George, and Ringo After The Beatles (Volume 3: George), Race Point Publishing (New York, NY, 2013; ISBN 978-1-937994-26-6).
- Howard Sounes, Down the Highway: The Life of Bob Dylan, Doubleday (London, 2001; ISBN 0-385-60125-5).
- Bruce Spizer, The Beatles Solo on Apple Records, 498 Productions (New Orleans, LA, 2005; ISBN 0-9662649-5-9).
- Gary Tillery, Working Class Mystic: A Spiritual Biography of George Harrison, Quest Books (Wheaton, IL, 2011; ISBN 978-0-8356-0900-5).
- Bob Woffinden, The Beatles Apart, Proteus (London, 1981; ISBN 0-906071-89-5).
