= Startle (disambiguation) =

The startle response is an unconscious defensive response to sudden or threatening stimuli.

Startle may also refer to:

- Startle display or deimatic behaviour, any pattern of bluffing behaviour in an animal that lacks strong defences
- Startle syndrome or hyperekplexia, a rare neurologic disorder
- Fear-potentiated startle, a reflexive physiological reaction to a presented stimulus

== See also ==
- Startling (disambiguation)
- Startle Evoked Movement, the involuntary initiation of a planned action in response to a startling stimuli.
