= Early Takes: Volume 1 =

2012 compilation album by George Harrison

Compilation album by George Harrison
- Released: 1 May 2012
- Recorded: 1970–1980s
- Genres: Rock, folk
- Length: 30:29
- Label: UM^{e}
- Producer: George Harrison
- Compiler: Giles Martin

George Harrison chronology
Collaborations (with Ravi Shankar) (2010)	Early Takes: Volume 1 (2012)	The Apple Years 1968–75 (2014)

Early Takes: Volume 1 is a compilation album of outtakes and demo recordings by the English rock musician George Harrison, released posthumously on 1 May 2012. The recordings appeared in Martin Scorsese's 2011 documentary film George Harrison: Living in the Material World and were originally issued as part of the deluxe version of the DVD release. Producer Giles Martin compiled the album, working with engineer Paul Hicks. The majority of the tracks date from the sessions for Harrison's 1970 triple album All Things Must Pass.

== Background ==
Giles Martin said he was invited by George Harrison's widow Olivia to hear tapes of Harrison's unreleased recordings in 2009 and to help compile the music for Martin Scorsese's 2011 documentary film George Harrison: Living in the Material World. Martin worked on the project with engineer Paul Hicks at Harrison's Friar Park home in Oxfordshire. In music historian Warren Zanes' description, the creation of the film "will likely be remembered as one of the great archaeological digs in rock and roll’s material history".

According to Olivia Harrison, the decision to release an album of this unissued music was mainly for her late husband's fans. She added: "They wanted to hear it, they've asked for it ... They're so close to the songs, and these early takes really get to the essence of the songs."

== Song selection ==
Six of the album's ten tracks date from the sessions for Harrison's 1970 triple album All Things Must Pass. These include a demo of "My Sweet Lord" that Martin said Harrison taped at the start of the project, with a rhythm section comprising Ringo Starr and Klaus Voormann. Writing in 2014, rock historian Richie Unterberger said that the Early Takes versions of "All Things Must Pass" and "Awaiting on You All" were probably recorded at the same time with this line-up. According to the recording notes compiled for the 50th anniversary release of All Things Must Pass, the demo session with Starr and Voormann took place on 26 May 1970, two days before the start of formal recording for the triple album.

Early Takes also includes Harrison's solo version of "Run of the Mill", which he taped on 27 May during the second day of demo recording. (Note: The fifteen solo demos made that day had become known to collectors via the 1994 bootleg collection Beware of ABKCO! They were officially released in August 2021 as part of the 50th anniversary Special Deluxe Edition of All Things Must Pass.) Citing Martin's comments in a 2012 interview for MusicRadar, Unterberger says that the early take of "Woman Don't You Cry for Me" probably dates from the All Things Must Pass period. Harrison subsequently re-recorded the song for his 1976 album Thirty Three & 1/3. The Early Takes version is performed in a country blues style, with acoustic guitar and jew's harp. (Note: Martin said the jew's harp was possibly played by Jonathan Clyde, an Apple Corps executive.)

The cover versions of Bob Dylan's "Mama You've Been on My Mind" and the Everly Brothers' hit "Let It Be Me" represented new songs in Harrison's solo catalogue. All the other demos and early takes were of songs that he officially released between 1970 and 1976. Harrison recorded "Mama You've Been on My Mind" at his Friar Park studio in the 1980s. Martin decided to strip back Harrison's demo, removing most of the keyboard and drum-machine backing. The demo of "Let It Be Me" dates from 1983 and was made soon after Harrison had attended a concert on the Everly Brothers' reunion tour, at the Royal Albert Hall in London.

Martin chose to end the album with Harrison's demo of "The Light That Has Lighted the World". Harrison had intended the song to be the B-side of a single he was producing for Cilla Black in August 1972. He instead completed it for inclusion on his 1973 album Living in the Material World.

== Release ==
Early Takes: Volume 1 was released as a standalone album on 1 May 2012 by UM^{e} on CD, LP and as a digital download. The album was originally issued in October 2011, as part of a deluxe edition Blu-ray, DVD and CD release of the documentary in the United Kingdom. According to Unterberger, the six All Things Must Pass-era demos and early takes were "ravenously welcomed" by ardent Harrison fans, but there was also disappointment at the lack of recording details supplied with the album. In his MusicRadar interview, Martin said that he still had a large amount of Harrison's recording archive to explore and there was no formal schedule in place for releasing further volumes of his demos and outtakes.

Early Takes debuted at number 66 in the UK and number 20 on the US Billboard 200. In other US charts, it peaked at number 3 on Billboard's Top Soundtracks, number 7 on Top Rock Albums and number 17 on Top Digital Albums. The compilation also debuted at number 51 on the Canadian Albums Chart.

== Critical reception ==
Professional ratings
Aggregate scores
Source	Rating
Metacritic	79/100
Review scores
Source	Rating
AllMusic	3/5 stars
American Songwriter	4/5 stars
The Independent	4/5 stars
Mojo	4/5 stars
Music Story	4/5 stars
No Ripcord	9/10
PopMatters	7/10 stars
Record Collector	4/5 stars
Rolling Stone	4/5 stars
Ultimate Classic Rock	8/10
Uncut	8/10

David Fricke of Rolling Stone said that the album deserved a "brass-band welcome" and concluded: "This set's subtitle suggests there are more rarities to come; based on the quality here, I propose a full-blown Anthology."

Writing in the Uncut Ultimate Music Guide title on Harrison, in 2018, Peter Watts gave Early Takes a five-star review and described it as a "miraculous" collection that featured the best cover art of all the artist's compilation albums and included engaging performances by Harrison, particularly his "rapturous first take" of "Awaiting on You All".

== Track listing ==
All songs written by George Harrison, except where noted.

1. "My Sweet Lord" (demo) – 3:33
2. "Run of the Mill" (demo) – 1:56
3. "I'd Have You Anytime" (early take) (Harrison, Bob Dylan) – 3:06
4. "Mama You've Been on My Mind" (demo) (Dylan) – 3:04
5. "Let It Be Me" (demo) (Gilbert Bécaud, Mann Curtis) – 2:56
6. "Woman Don't You Cry for Me" (early take) – 2:44
7. "Awaiting on You All" (early take) – 2:40
8. "Behind That Locked Door" (demo) – 3:29
9. "All Things Must Pass" (demo) – 4:48
10. "The Light That Has Lighted the World" (demo) – 2:23

== Charts ==
Chart performance for Early Takes: Volume 1
Chart (2012)	Peak Position
Belgian Ultratop (Flanders) Albums	97
Canadian Albums Chart	51
French SNEP Albums	177
Italian FIMI Albums	58
Japanese Oricon Weekly Albums Chart	88
Netherlands Album Top 100	61
Norwegian VG-lista Topp 40 Albums	37
Spanish Promusicae Top 100 Albums	89
UK Albums Chart	66
US Billboard 200	20
US Top Rock Albums	7
