= Startling Music =

British music publishing company

Startling Music Ltd
- Industry: Music publishing
- Founded: 1963
- Founder: Ringo Starr
- Headquarters: England
- Key people: Bruce Grakal; Richard Rees-Pulley; Richard Starkey

Startling Music Ltd is a music publishing company, founded by musician Ringo Starr, drummer of the Beatles.

Starr had initially been signed to Northern Songs, the company set up by publisher Dick James and Beatles manager Brian Epstein on behalf of the band in 1963. As the main songwriting Beatles, John Lennon and Paul McCartney drew a larger share of benefits (and royalties) from their contract, while Starr and George Harrison were sometimes given second-class treatment, and found their songs and interests under-promoted by the company.

When Northern Songs was turned into a public company, Starr and Harrison were each given part-ownership (their shares together totalling about 1.8% of the venture), on top of the writer's royalties from their published songs. This was not incentive enough to re-sign with Northern Songs, though, as Lennon and McCartney (who owned about 15% each) did in 1968, when the band's publishing deal expired. Instead, Harrison started his own publishing company, Harrisongs, and Starr followed suit, establishing Startling Music. Both were thus somewhat insulated when Northern Songs fell victim to a buyout from ATV in 1969. (While Lennon and McCartney made the most of the situation by cashing in their shares in the company they no longer controlled, Starr and Harrison retained theirs, and continued to have a minority voice in Northern Songs.)

While Starr wrote the fewest songs of any Beatle (his contribution was more in ideas for lyrics or themes, occasional one-liners, or titles such as "A Hard Day's Night" and "Tomorrow Never Knows"), owning his own publishing gave Starr a sounder business footing, and a larger share of income than he had had as a "paid writer". Startling Music published "Don't Pass Me By" and "Octopus's Garden" and handled royalties for his co-written material with the other Beatles, on their last albums.

After the Beatles broke up in 1970, Starr wrote or co-wrote much more of his own material for his solo records (with Vini Poncia becoming a longtime collaborator, and Harrison teaming up with Starr on "Photograph" and other songs), and Startling Music continued to publish Starr's new music. He also bought the publishing rights to the songs he recorded in 1970 for Beaucoups of Blues, his second solo album and a venture into the country and western genre. With a string of hit singles and two hit albums in the early 1970s, Starr and his company both prospered.

== See also ==
- Music published by Startling Music
