= George Harrison: Living in the Material World =

2011 film by Martin Scorsese

- Theatrical release poster by F. Ron Miller
- Directed by: Martin Scorsese
- Produced by: Olivia Harrison; Martin Scorsese; Nigel Sinclair
- Cinematography: Robert Richardson; Martin Kenzie
- Edited by: David Tedeschi
- Production companies: Grove Street Pictures; Spitfire Pictures; Sikelia Productions
- Distributed by: HBO
- Release date: 5 October 2011
- Running time: 208 minutes
- Country: United States
- Language: English
- Box office: $367,734

George Harrison: Living in the Material World is a 2011 American documentary film co-produced and directed by Martin Scorsese, based on the life of musician George Harrison, a former member of the Beatles. The film's release was coordinated with both a companion book and an album of Harrison's demo recordings. The film earned Emmy Awards for Outstanding Directing for Nonfiction Programming and Outstanding Nonfiction Special.

== Premise ==
The film offers a biographical perspective on the life of musician George Harrison, from his early life in Liverpool, the Beatlemania phenomenon, his travels to India, the influence of the International Society for Krishna Consciousness in his music, and his relevance and importance as a member of the Beatles. It consists of previously unseen footage alongside a wide range of interviews, including Olivia and Dhani Harrison.

== Appearances ==
- Neil Aspinall
- John Barham
- Jane Birkin
- Pattie Boyd
- Eric Clapton
- Ray Cooper
- Bob Dylan
- Mal Evans
- Terry Gilliam
- Mukunda Goswami
- Dhani Harrison
- Olivia Harrison
- Harry Harrison
- Irene Harrison
- Louise Harrison
- Pauline Harrison
- Peter Harrison
- Damon Hill
- Eric Idle
- Arthur Kelly
- Jim Keltner
- Astrid Kirchherr
- Paul Lanzanic
- John Lennon
- Jeff Lynne
- George Martin
- Paul McCartney
- Gary Moore
- Gordon Murray
- Yoko Ono
- Roy Orbison
- Tom Petty
- Billy Preston
- Red Ronnie
- Ken Scott
- Ravi Shankar
- Phil Spector
- Ringo Starr
- Jackie Stewart
- Joan Taylor
- Klaus Voormann
- Gary Wright
- George Harrison

== Production ==
After Harrison's death in 2001, various production companies approached his widow Olivia about producing a film about her late husband's life. She declined because he had wanted to tell his own life story through his video archive. Upon meeting Scorsese, she gave her blessings and signed on to the film project as a producer.

According to Scorsese, he was attracted to the project because "That subject matter has never left me...The more you're in the material world, the more there is a tendency for a search for serenity and a need to not be distracted by physical elements that are around you. His music is very important to me, so I was interested in the journey that he took as an artist. The film is an exploration. We don't know. We're just feeling our way through."

Throughout 2008 and 2009, Scorsese alternated working between Shutter Island and the documentary. Scorsese, his editor David Tedeschi, and a small army of researchers spent five years assembling interviews, music, film clips, photos, and memorabilia.

== Release ==
The documentary premièred at the Foundation for Art and Creative Technology in Liverpool on 2 October 2011. It was shown on HBO in two parts on 5 and 6 October 2011 in the United States and Canada and as a two-part Arena special on BBC Two on 12 and 13 November 2011 in the United Kingdom. It was first theatrically released in Australia on 20 October 2011.

== Deluxe edition CD ==
All songs written by George Harrison, except where noted.

1. "My Sweet Lord" (Demo) – 3:33
2. "Run of the Mill" (Demo) – 1:56
3. "I'd Have You Anytime" (Early Take) (George Harrison, Bob Dylan) – 3:06
4. "Mama, You've Been on My Mind" (Demo) (Bob Dylan) – 3:04
5. "Let It Be Me" (Demo) (Gilbert Bécaud, Mann Curtis, Pierre Delanoë) – 2:56
6. "Woman Don't You Cry for Me" (Early Take) – 2:44
7. "Awaiting on You All" (Early Take) – 2:40
8. "Behind That Locked Door" (Demo) – 3:29
9. "All Things Must Pass" (Demo) – 4:38
10. "The Light That Has Lighted the World" (Demo) – 2:23

== Book ==
Olivia Harrison authored the book George Harrison: Living in the Material World published by Abrams in 2011. The book was edited by Mark Holborn and contains a foreword by Scorsese and an introduction by author and literary critic Paul Theroux.

== Response ==
=== Box office ===
George Harrison: Living in the Material World was released on television in the United States and Canada so no box office taking was recorded. It had a limited theatrical release in some countries with worldwide total takings of $367,734.

=== Critical reception ===
The film holds an 87% approval rating at Rotten Tomatoes, based on 38 professional reviews, with an average rating of 7.5/10. The website's critics consensus reads, "Clocking in at nearly three and a half hours, George Harrison: Living in the Material World is a moving portrait of the so-called Quiet Beatle's spirituality and troubled existence that highlights the best of Scorsese's sensibilities." On Metacritic, the film holds a score of 74 out of 100, based on 13 critics, indicating "generally favorable" reviews.

=== Accolades ===
The film earned six nominations at the 64th Primetime Emmy Awards, winning two: Outstanding Directing for Nonfiction Programming and Outstanding Nonfiction Special. Other nominations included Outstanding Cinematography, Outstanding Picture Editing, Outstanding Sound Editing, and Outstanding Sound Mixing.
