= Material World Charitable Foundation =

Charitable organisation founded by English musician George Harrison

- Founded: 1973
- Founder: George Harrison
- Region served: Worldwide
- Website: https://www.materialworldfoundation.com/

The Material World Charitable Foundation, also known as the Material World Foundation (MWF), is a charitable organisation founded by English musician George Harrison in April 1973. Its launch coincided with the release of Harrison's album Living in the Material World and came about in reaction to the taxation issues that had hindered his 1971–72 aid project for refugees of the Bangladesh Liberation War. Harrison assigned his publishing royalties from nine of the eleven songs on Living in the Material World, including the hit single "Give Me Love (Give Me Peace on Earth)", to the foundation, in perpetuity.

The MWF's purpose is to donate to various causes and promote diverse artistic endeavours and philosophies. Its first project in the latter regard was sponsoring a 1974 revue of Indian classical music – the Music Festival from India – led by Ravi Shankar and featuring world music pioneers such as Shivkumar Sharma, Hariprasad Chaurasia, L. Subramaniam and Sultan Khan. A year after Harrison's death, proceeds from the 2002 Concert for George, along with accompanying album and film releases, went to the foundation for dispersal to appropriate charities. The Material World Charitable Foundation continues to operate under the objectives outlined by Harrison in 1974, funded by income from his donated copyrights.

== Establishment ==
The Material World Charitable Foundation was established by George Harrison in 1973 to sponsor diverse forms of artistic expression and to encourage the exploration of alternative life views and philosophies. The foundation also supports established charitable organizations with consideration to those with special needs. Funds for the activities of the foundation have and will continue to come from copyrights donated by George Harrison.

— MWF statement, September 1974

George Harrison founded the Material World Charitable Foundation, or MWF, on 26 April 1973, close to two years after he had organised the Concert for Bangladesh in New York as a benefit for refugees of the Bangladesh Liberation War. As effective as this relief effort had been in raising awareness in the Western world and helping to stop the war between what was then West and East Pakistan, the revenue it generated for the refugees had been denied tax-exempt status in America and the UK. In addition, up to $10 million of the funds remained in escrow, subject to an IRS audit. Speaking to British DJ Nicky Horne, Harrison recognised that the existence of a foundation or trust in 1971 would have ensured that all the revenue had reached UNICEF immediately, but that "there was no real planning [for the Concert for Bangladesh] … it was an emergency."

Harrison named the foundation after the title track to his 1973 album, Living in the Material World, a composition in which he contrasts the temptations of the material world with the pursuit of spiritual goals. To fund the MWF, Harrison donated his copyright for nine of the eleven songs on the album, ensuring a perpetual stream of income through his publishing royalties. The album enjoyed considerable commercial success, topping America's Billboard chart for five weeks, and produced one of Harrison's most popular hit songs, "Give Me Love (Give Me Peace on Earth)". Harrison similarly assigned to the MWF his copyright to "Sunshine Life for Me", a track he recorded with Ringo Starr for the latter's Ringo album, another bestseller over 1973–74. (Note: These copyrights were administered by Harrison's publishing company, Harrisongs, which similarly passed on its publishing royalties from the songs to the Material World Charitable Foundation.) For the foundation's logo, Harrison used an adaptation of the traditional Om symbol in Devanagari, as it appeared on the artwork for Material World and his subsequent album, Dark Horse (1974).

According to the stated mission of the Material World Charitable Foundation, its purpose is twofold: to serve as a charitable organisation making donations to various causes, and to sponsor and encourage artistic endeavours and "alternative life views and philosophies". During the same conversation with Horne, in August 1974, Harrison explained that, as with his recently launched Dark Horse record label, his inspiration for the foundation was similar to what the Beatles had intended for their Apple organisation in 1968: "a foundation in which we could help [people]". The establishment of the Material World Charitable Foundation ensured that all the money he personally made through music and wished to donate could find its way to the cause of his choice, whereas otherwise, to donate £10 he had to earn at least ten times that amount. (Note: In the case of the Concert for Bangladesh, Britain's Inland Revenue had viewed earnings from the 1972 live album and film as Harrison's personal income. Having already passed on those earnings to UNICEF, Harrison then had to write the tax department a personal cheque for £1 million.)

== Activities ==
Harrison credited his friendship with Indian musician Ravi Shankar as being instrumental in his aims for the MWF, since Shankar had led him to a greater appreciation of other cultures and their music. The foundation's first venture was to sponsor Ravi Shankar's Music Festival from India, the debut performance of which took place at London's Royal Albert Hall on 23 September 1974. Harrison had first envisioned such a festival of Indian classical music in 1967–68, as a means of presenting India's musical and cultural heritage to a Western audience. The Music Festival brought together established pioneers of the genre, such as Shivkumar Sharma and Hariprasad Chaurasia, and future international stars including L. Subramaniam and Sultan Khan. The foundation also sponsored a series of European concerts by this ensemble of musicians and singers. Harrison biographer Simon Leng writes of the achievement in staging the Music Festival: "In effect, this was the first Indian orchestra to appear in Europe." Three of the concerts on Harrison and Shankar's joint North American tour at the end of that year were benefits for the Material World Charitable Foundation.

After Harrison's death in November 2001, his hit song "My Sweet Lord" was reissued as a charity single, the proceeds from which the MWF distributed to organisations such as Médecins Sans Frontières, Great Ormond Street Hospital and Britain's National Society for the Prevention of Cruelty to Children. The foundation then sponsored the 2002 Concert for George tribute, and the funds raised through associated film and album releases in 2003 similarly went to the MWF for distribution to charitable causes. In his 2009 book You Never Give Me Your Money, author Peter Doggett wrote that the Material World Charitable Foundation "continues to fund worthy causes to this day". Another humanitarian initiative resulting from the Concert for Bangladesh, the George Harrison Fund for UNICEF, remains active with international projects to help provide emergency relief for children in the Horn of Africa in 2011 and fundraising challenges through the Association of College Unions International.

As Harrison had intended, the perpetual donation of his 1973 copyrights has continued to benefit the foundation. Commercial re-releases for the songs include the remastered Living in the Material World in September 2006, which added the long-unavailable B-side "Miss O'Dell", another composition that Harrison assigned to the MWF in 1973; the career-spanning compilation Let It Roll: Songs by George Harrison (2009), containing "Give Me Love"; and Early Takes: Volume 1 (2012), which includes a demo of "The Light That Has Lighted the World".

== Sources ==
- Keith Badman, The Beatles Diary Volume 2: After the Break-Up 1970–2001, Omnibus Press (London, 2001; ISBN 0-7119-8307-0).
- Alan Clayson, George Harrison, Sanctuary (London, 2003; ISBN 1-86074-489-3).
- Collaborations, book accompanying Collaborations box set by Ravi Shankar and George Harrison (Dark Horse Records, 2010; produced by Olivia Harrison; package design by Drew Lorimer & Olivia Harrison).
- Peter Doggett, You Never Give Me Your Money: The Beatles After the Breakup, It Books (New York, NY, 2011; ISBN 978-0-06-177418-8).
- The Editors of Rolling Stone, Harrison, Rolling Stone Press/Simon & Schuster (New York, NY, 2002; ISBN 0-7432-3581-9).
- George Harrison, I Me Mine, Chronicle Books (San Francisco, CA, 2002; ISBN 0-8118-3793-9).
- Olivia Harrison, George Harrison: Living in the Material World, Abrams (New York, NY, 2011; ISBN 978-1-4197-0220-4).
- Ian Inglis, The Words and Music of George Harrison, Praeger (Santa Barbara, CA, 2010; ISBN 978-0-313-37532-3).
- Peter Lavezzoli, The Dawn of Indian Music in the West, Continuum (New York, NY, 2006; ISBN 0-8264-2819-3).
- Simon Leng, While My Guitar Gently Weeps: The Music of George Harrison, Hal Leonard (Milwaukee, WI, 2006; ISBN 1-4234-0609-5).
- Chip Madinger & Mark Easter, Eight Arms to Hold You: The Solo Beatles Compendium, 44.1 Productions (Chesterfield, MO, 2000; ISBN 0-615-11724-4).
- The New Rolling Stone Encyclopedia of Rock & Roll, Fireside/Rolling Stone Press (New York, NY, 1995; ISBN 0-684-81044-1).
- Nicholas Schaffner, The Beatles Forever, McGraw-Hill (New York, NY, 1978; ISBN 0-07-055087-5).
- Bruce Spizer, The Beatles Solo on Apple Records, 498 Productions (New Orleans, LA, 2005; ISBN 0-9662649-5-9).
- Gary Tillery, Working Class Mystic: A Spiritual Biography of George Harrison, Quest Books (Wheaton, IL, 2011; ISBN 978-0-8356-0900-5).
- Bob Woffinden, The Beatles Apart, Proteus (London, 1981; ISBN 0-906071-89-5).
- World Music: The Rough Guide (Volume 2: Latin and North America, Caribbean, India, Asia and Pacific), Rough Guides/Penguin (London, 2000; ISBN 1-85828-636-0).
