= Harrisongs =

British music publishing company

Harrisongs Ltd
- Type: Limited
- Industry: Music publishing
- Genre: Pop, rock
- Founded: England, 1964
- Founder: George Harrison
- Products: See Category:Music published by Harrisongs

Harrisongs Ltd is a music publishing company, founded in 1964 by English musician and songwriter George Harrison, then a member of the Beatles. On 11 September 1964, Harrison created Mornyork Ltd, which, by 7 December that year, had changed its name to Harrisongs Ltd. The company is headquartered at 27 Ovington Square in London's Knightsbridge district, in the same building that houses the Beatles' Apple Corps.

Harrison's earliest Beatles compositions were published by Northern Songs, the company set up in 1963 by Dick James and Brian Epstein on behalf of John Lennon and Paul McCartney, who were the main songwriting Beatles. Harrison and Ringo Starr had both signed contracts with Northern Songs, but neither was satisfied with their subsequent writer's royalties and the lowly status implicit in this business arrangement. In 1967, Harrison wrote "Only a Northern Song" about his dissatisfaction with the company. He duly let his Northern Songs contract expire in March 1968 and adopted Harrisongs for his music publishing, while Starr founded Startling Music.

Harrison's 1968 solo album Wonderwall Music was the last release on which his new compositions were published by Northern Songs and its US counterpart, Maclen Music. That year, Harrisongs published "Sour Milk Sea", together with his four contributions to the Beatles' eponymous double album, including "While My Guitar Gently Weeps".

Harrison's two songs on the band's 1969 album Abbey Road, "Here Comes the Sun" and "Something", became the most widely syndicated compositions from that album, due in part to the number of cover versions they attracted. With over 150 cover recordings and the enduring popularity of the Beatles' version, "Something" provided Harrisongs with what author Mark Lewisohn terms "a rich flow of royalties down the years". Lewisohn also comments that, with Harrison's ownership of the company increasing from 80 per cent to 100 per cent in 1970, the move from Northern Songs proved especially beneficial, as disagreements between Lennon and McCartney had resulted in them losing control and much of the revenue generated from their songs.

Harrison's company also published his early post-Beatles solo work, including the songs from All Things Must Pass. In 1973, Harrison assigned the publishing rights for his new album, Living in the Material World, to the Material World Charitable Foundation, a Harrisongs-administered charitable organisation he set up to aid starving countries.

His songs from 1974's Dark Horse onwards were originally published by Ganga Publishing, B.V. in the United States and Oops Publishing in the United Kingdom and other parts of the world. They are now published by Umlaut Corporation, which is controlled by the composer's widow, Olivia Harrison. As of 2016, the Harrisongs catalogue is administered worldwide by the Bicycle Music Company, a division of Concord Music.

Harrisongs is also the publishing company for Harrison's son Dhani's indie rock band, thenewno2. This portion is administered by BMG Rights Management.

== See also ==
- Category:Music published by Oops Publishing and Ganga Publishing, B.V.
