= Malati Dasi =

Senior spiritual leader of ISKCON

Mālatī Dāsī
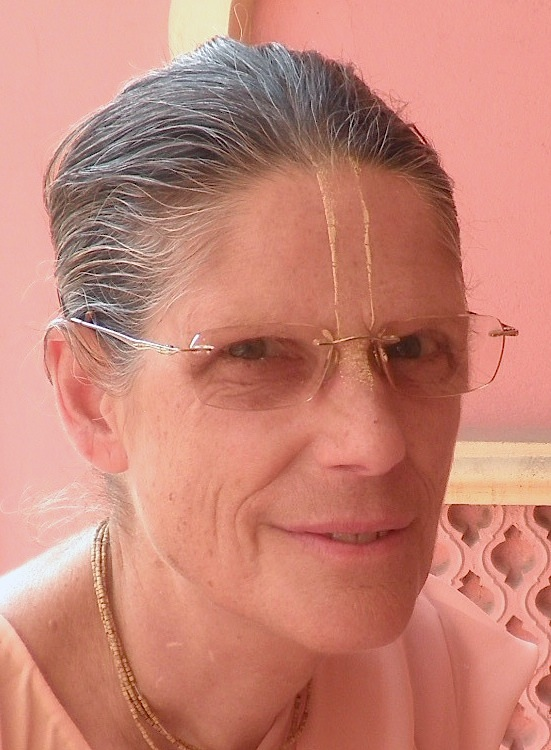
- Malati Dasi in 2011

Personal life
- Born: August 30, 1945 (age 81) Vallejo, California, U.S.
- Other name: Melanie Lee Nagel
- Website: www.newvrindaban.com

Religious life
- Religion: Hinduism
- Philosophy: Achintya Bheda Abheda; Bhakti yoga
- Sect: Gaudiya Vaishnavism
- Initiation: Diksa–1967

Religious career
- Based in: New Vrindaban, West Virginia, USA
- Post: Member of the Governing Body Commission (1998–present)

Sanskrit name
- Sanskrit: मालती दासी

Malati Dasi (Note: Sanskrit: मालती दासी, IAST: Mālatī Dāsī, also Mālatī Devī Dāsī) (born Melanie Lee Nagel on August 30, 1945) is a senior spiritual leader of the International Society for Krishna Consciousness (ISKCON). Born in Vallejo, California, she was part of the hippie movement before becoming an initiated disciple of A. C. Bhaktivedanta Swami Prabhupada in 1967. In the same year, she and her husband, Shyamasundar Das, helped Mukunda Das organize the Mantra-Rock Dance, a countercultural musical event held at the Avalon Ballroom in San Francisco; the dance was a fundraiser for ISKCON's first center on the west coast of the US.

In 1968, together with five other Hare Krishna followers, Malati flew to London to establish ISKCON's foothold in the United Kingdom. There, she helped introduce Beatles guitarist George Harrison to Gaudiya Vaishnava's philosophy and practice. In recognition of her pioneering role in ISKCON's UK missionary activities, Malati was invited as a special guest to attend the 30th anniversary of the Bhaktivedanta Manor, ISKCON's headquarters in England, donated by Harrison to the organization in 1973.

In 1997, Malati helped organize the ISKCON Women's Ministry, which paved the way for the provision of "equal facilities, full encouragement, and genuine care and protection for the women members of ISKCON." In 1998, despite fierce opposition, Malati became the first female member of the Governing Body Commission of ISKCON.

== Early years ==
Melanie Lee Nagel was born on August 30, 1945, in Vallejo, California. After graduating, in 1963, from El Camino Fundamental High School in Sacramento, California, Nagel attended Reed College in Portland, Oregon. She dropped out before graduating and joined the counterculture movement of the 1960s. After her boyfriend, Sam Speerstra, got a position with the US Forest Service, she lived with him in a remote lookout tower near Bend, Oregon, where their job was to spot forest fires and report them to the National Park Service.

== Hare Krishna temple in San Francisco ==
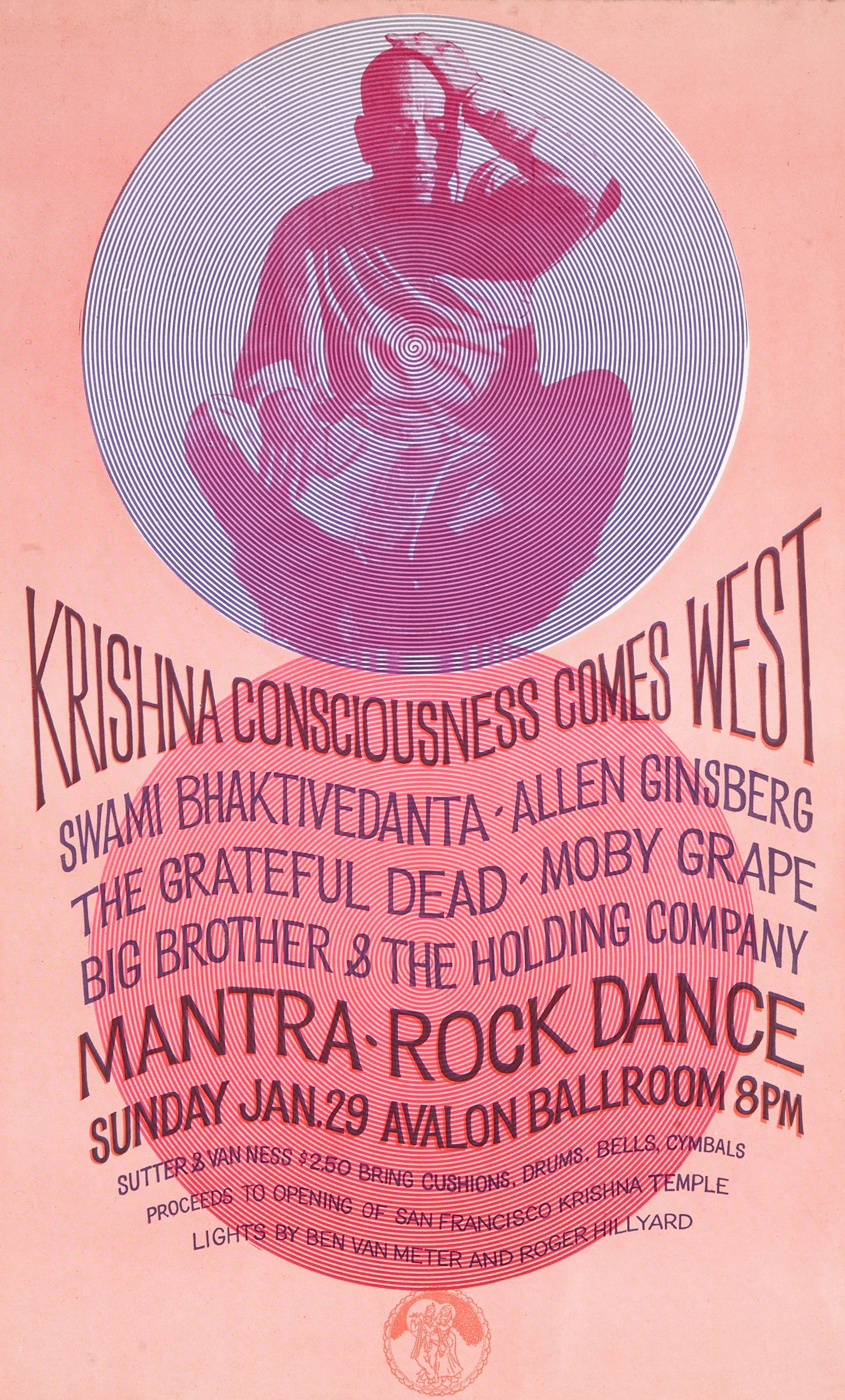
The Mantra-Rock Dance poster by Harvey W. Cohen (created December 1966)

In 1966, Speerstra's old friend from Reed College Michael Grant became one of the first Hare Krishna followers in the United States and was given the name Mukunda Das. A surprise visit in October 1966 by Mukunda and his wife Janaki Dasi inspired Speerstra and Nagel to start following Gaudiya Vaishnava teachings and spiritual practices. Speerstra and Nagel convinced Mukunda to postpone his planned trip to India in order to try to open a Hare Krishna temple in San Francisco, and offered their assistance. When Mukunda agreed, Speerstra and Nagel moved to San Francisco and helped rent a storefront in the San Francisco Haight-Ashbury neighborhood, which at that time was becoming the hub of hippie counterculture. Subsequently, Mukunda, Speerstra, and Nagel converted the storefront into the first Hare Krishna temple on the west coast of the US.

In order to raise funds, win supporters for the new temple, and popularize Prabhupada's teachings among the hippie and countercultural audience of the Haight-Ashbury scene, Mukunda, Speerstra, and Nagel decided to hold a charitable Mantra-Rock Dance concert at the Avalon Ballroom and invited Prabhupada to attend. Using his acquaintance with Rock Scully, manager of the Grateful Dead, and Sam Andrew, founding member and guitarist of the Big Brother and the Holding Company – who were among the most prominent rock groups in the United States at the time – Speerstra secured their consent to perform at the concert, charging only the "musicians’ union minimum" of $250. Preparing for the event, Nagel happened to hear Moby Grape, a relatively unknown group at the time, and convinced the other team members to invite the band to play at the concert as well. Her initiative later proved pivotal for Moby Grape, catapulting the band onto the professional stage, with subsequent gigs with The Doors at the Avalon Ballroom and at the "First Love Circus" at the Winterland Arena, and a contract with Columbia Records.

After Prabhupada arrived in San Francisco, he gave Sam and Melanie initiations and the names Shyamasundara Das Adhikari and Malati Devi Dasi. Malati Dasi became more active in the new temple activities, primarily in shopping, collecting donations of bulk produce, and cooking for what came to be wildly popular with the local hippie community as the "love feasts", or free distribution of prasad, opulent vegetarian food sanctified by being offered to Krishna.

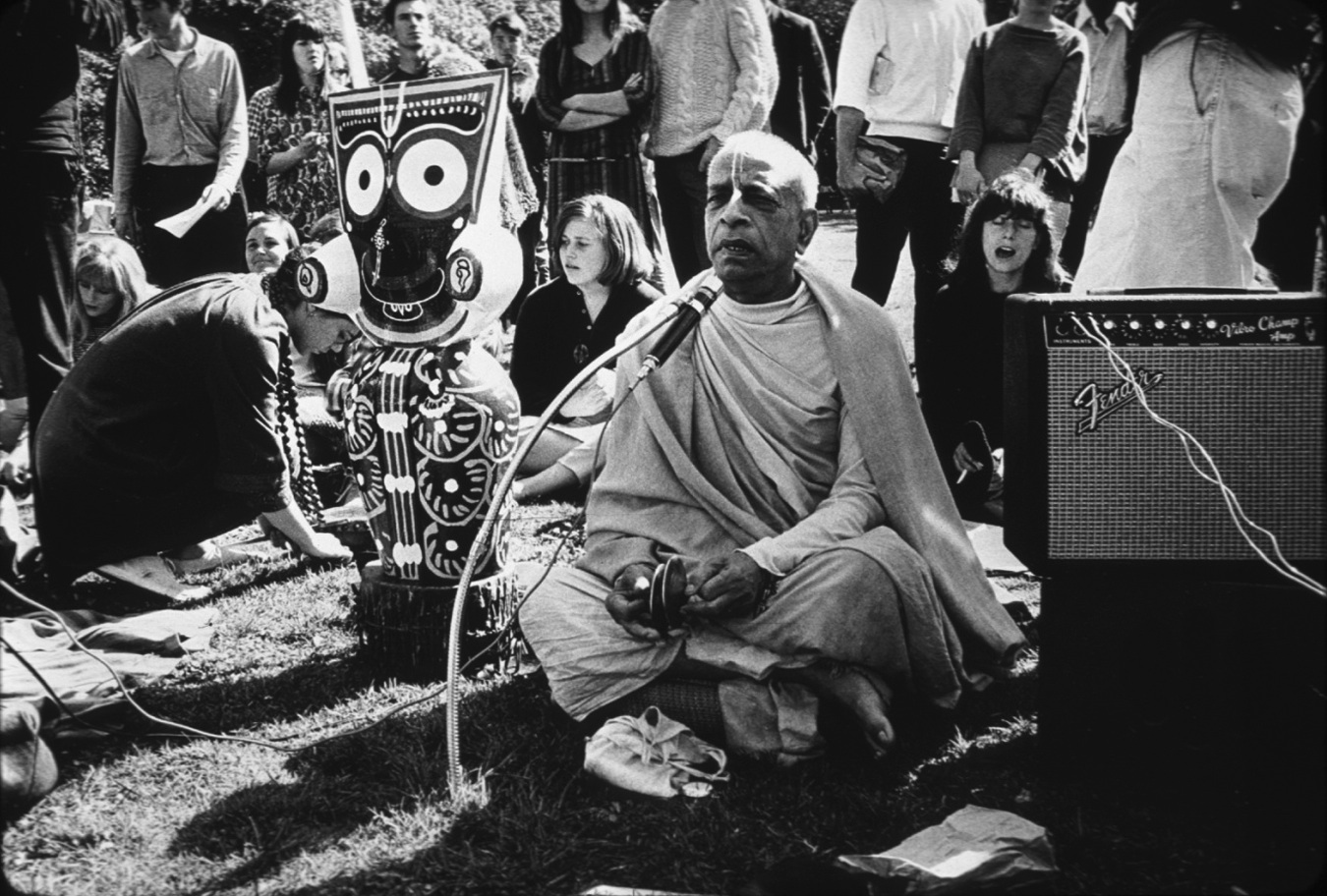
Bhaktivedanta Swami Prabhupada chanting in Golden Gate Park, San Francisco, with the deity of Jagannath to his right. February 1967

Malati is also credited for her role in introducing the worship of Jagannath, a form of Krishna, in ISKCON. Prabhupada's official biographer Satsvarupa Dasa Goswami describes the incident that happened in 1967 in San Francisco:

One day Malati hurried into Prabhupada's apartment, took a small item out of her shopping bag, and placed it on Prabhupada's desk for his inspection. "What is this, Swamiji?"

Shrila Prabhupada looked down and beheld a three-inch wooden doll with a flat head, a black, smiling face, and big, round eyes. The figure had stubby, forward-jutting arms, and a simple green and yellow torso with no visible feet. Shrila Prabhupada immediately folded his palms and bowed his head, offering the little figure respects.<

"You have brought Lord Jagannatha, the Lord of the universe," he said, smiling and bright-eyed. "He is Krsna. Thank you very much." Shrila Prabhupada beamed with pleasure, while Malati and others sat amazed at their good fortune of seeing Swamiji so pleased. Prabhupada explained that this was Lord Jagannatha, a Deity of Krsna worshiped all over India for thousands of years. Jagannatha, he said, is worshiped along with two other deities: His brother, Balarama, and His sister, Subhadra.

Excitedly, Malati confirmed that there were other, similar figures at Cost Plus, the import store where she had found the little Jagannatha, and Shrila Prabhupada said she should go back and buy them. Malati told her husband, Shyamasundara, and together they hurried back and bought the two other dolls in the set.

After acquiring a full set of Jagannath figures, Prabhupada asked Shyamasundara, an expert carpenter, to carve large replicas and then inaugurated their worship in the San Francisco temple, naming it "New Jagannatha Puri". Small duplicates of these deities immediately became a "psychedelic hit" and were worn by many hippies on strings around their necks.

== Preaching in England ==
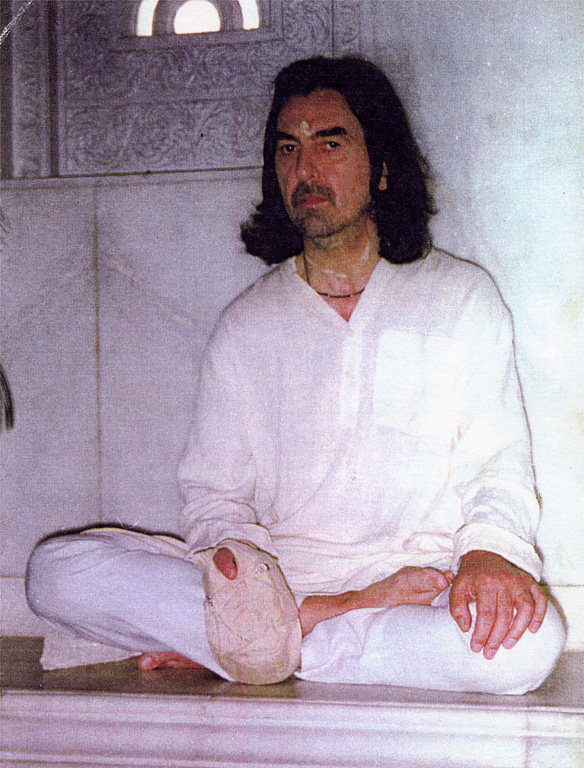
Malati Dasi helped introduce George Harrison to the spiritual practices of Gaudiya Vaishnavism (pictured performing japa, or chanting Hare Krishna on beads). Vrindavan (Uttar Pradesh, India), 1996

In 1968, Malati and Shyamasundara, along with their infant daughter Saraswati, joined two other Hare Krishna couples – Mukunda and Janaki, and Gurudas and Yamuna – on a missionary trip to London in a bid to establish for ISKCON a foothold in England. After arriving in London, the team endured many months of financial insecurity and inadequate living conditions while maintaining their missionary activities including public kirtans, the distribution of promotional leaflets, and the cultivation of members of the local community. They eventually settled in a warehouse complex in Covent Garden. Speaking in 2001 at the 30th anniversary of the Bhaktivedanta Manor, ISKCON's headquarters in England, where she was a special guest in recognition of her pioneering role in establishing ISKCON in the UK, Malati recalled:

There were indeed many special memories, but actually we should not forget something which wasn't so funny. Most of the time in the early days it was very hard: often we would go hungry. [We had] hardly any possessions, no money, no protection. It often got very cold. We had nothing. All we had was love for Shrila Prabhupada.

To gain a wider recognition for their movement, Shyamasundara had the idea of meeting the Beatles in order to inspire them to introduce the Hare Krishna mantra into their songs. Malati recalled, "We chanted and got arrested in front of the Apple Studio. We ultimately got their attention by making and sending in apple pies to the studio." Malati and Shyamasundara once sent into the studio a wind up apple holding a "Hare Krishna" flag. Things changed for the group when Shyamasundara finally met and befriended George Harrison, whom Malati found "receptive and very spiritual" and helped introduce to the Hare Krishna philosophy and practice. The two families became so close that Shyamasundara and Malati lived with Harrison and his wife, Pattie Boyd, for some time.

Inspired by the Vaishnava teachings and lifestyle, Harrison produced two singles – "Hare Krishna Mantra" and "Govinda" – performed by the Hare Krishna devotees from the Radha Krishna Temple in London. Malati participated in both recordings, singing and playing the hand cymbals. Released on Apple Records, "Hare Krishna Mantra" reached number 12 on the UK Singles Chart and significantly boosted ISKCON's popularity in England and worldwide, with the devotees appearing on Top of the Pops. Harrison also helped the devotees rent a building in London's Bury Place near the British Museum for their first Hare Krishna temple, and, in 1973, donated a 17-acre (6.9 ha) estate, which was named "Bhaktivedanta Manor" and became ISKCON's headquarters in England.

== Governing Body Commissioner ==
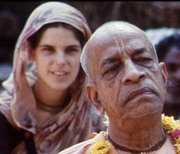
Malati Dasi accompanying Prabhupada on a morning walk in Vrindavan (Uttar Pradesh, India) in 1975.

ISKCON's founder A. C. Bhaktivedanta Swami Prabhupada openly appreciated, encouraged, and supported his female disciples in their diverse roles within ISKCON – females led kirtans, gave public classes and public lectures, managed temples, served as priests, went as missionaries to "ISKCON's unchartered territories," headed his Bhaktivedanta Book Trust, and personally served him as secretaries, cooks, and photographers. He even recommended two women to be named founding members of ISKCON's highest international ecclesiastical and managerial body, the Governing Body Commission (GBC). Prabhupada defended the active involvement of his female followers in ISKCON's spiritual and managerial activities from critics, which included some traditional Gaudiya Matha members and other orthodox followers of Hinduism in India.

Towards the end of the 1970s, however, the growth in number and influence of sannyasis (male lifelong celibates) in ISKCON's spiritual and managerial affairs led to greater male domination of the organization, and the consequent segregation, disempowerment, and denigration of women, who were denied access to prominent roles in ISKCON. In the late 1980s, criticism of the treatment of women within ISKCON and the discrimination against them in the institution's key activities began to take shape in the form of printed articles and women's conventions.

In the mid-1990s, Malati played a leading role in efforts to ensure equality for women in the organization and helped form ISKCON Women's Ministry in 1997, headed by Sudharma Dasi. Malati became a vocal suffragette within ISKCON, which led to her "fiercely debated but historic appointment" to the GBC in 1998. In 2000, the presence of Malati and Sudharma on the GBC led to serious discussion of women's role in the organization at the GBC's annual meeting in Mayapur (West Bengal, India), and called for "an apology for the mistakes of the past, recognition of the importance of women for the health of the movement, and the reinstatement of women's participatory rights." The resultant resolution of the GBC acknowledged the importance of the issue and asserted the priority of providing "equal facilities, full encouragement, and genuine care and protection for the women members of ISKCON."

Malati's responsibilities, as one of the 32 GBC global secretaries, include overseeing the activities of ISKCON in the US (Florida, Michigan, Kentucky, Ohio, Pennsylvania, and the New Vrindaban community in West Virginia), which she visits twice a year. Described as "soft spoken" and having "an uncommon mix of humility and charisma," Malati is respected for her "clear understanding" of ISKCON's history and teachings and often counsels devotees, lectures on Gaudiya Vaishnava's philosophy and practice, and participates in inter-religious meetings.
