= Brahma Samhita =

Hindu Pancharatra text

Cover of Bhakti Siddhānta Sarasvatī's translation of the Brahma Saṁhitā (1st edition, 1932).

The Brahma Samhita (IAST: Brahma-saṁhitā) is a Sanskrit Pancharatra text, composed of verses of prayer spoken by Brahma before the formation of the universe, glorifying Krishna, the supreme personality of godhead.

It is revered within Gaudiya Vaishnavism, whose 16th-century founder, Chaitanya Mahaprabhu (1486–1534), rediscovered a part of the work, the 62 verses of chapter five, which had previously been lost for a few centuries, at the Adikesava Perumal Temple, Kanyakumari, in South India. Mitsunori Matsubara, in his Pañcarātra Saṁhitās and Early Vaisṇava Theology dates the text at c.1300 CE. The text contains a highly esoteric description of Krishna in his abode, Goloka.

In 1970, George Harrison produced a modern recording of these prayers performed by devotees of the Radha Krishna Temple in London. Titled "Govinda", the song took its title from the main chorus line of the prayer "govindam ādi-puruṣam tam ahaṁ bhajāmi", meaning "I worship Govinda, the primeval Lord". This prayer was sung by Yamunā Devi, a disciple of A.C. Bhaktivedanta Swami Prabhupada.

Madhvacharya of Brahma Sampradaya in his Brahmasutra commentary has quoted the Brahma Samhita multiple times.

== Recovered text ==
The recovered fragment of the Brahma Samhita commences at the fifth chapter, whose first verse states:

īśvaraḥ paramaḥ kṛṣṇaḥ sac-cid-ānanda-vigrahaḥ
anādir ādir govindaḥ sarva kāraṇa kāraṇam

This translates to:

Krishna, who is known as Govinda, is the Supreme Personality of Godhead. He has an eternal blissful spiritual body. He is the origin of all. He has no other origin and He is the prime cause of all causes.

The text was first translated from Sanskrit into English by Bhaktisiddhanta Saraswati in 1932 and is often sung or recited as both a devotional and philosophical text.

== See also ==
- Valmiki Samhita
- Satchitananda
- Lord's Prayer
- Achintya Bheda Abheda
- Brahma Sampradaya
- Jiva Goswami
- Garga Samhita
