= Yamuna Devi =

American religious figure, cookbook author, musician and teacher

Yamunā Devī Dāsī
- Born: Joan Agnes Campanella; May 19, 1942; Butte, Montana
- Died: December 20, 2011 (aged 69)
- Occupation: Cookbook author
- Notable work: Lord Krishna's Cuisine (1987); Yamuna's Table (1993)

Yamuna Devi (also Yamunā Devī Dāsī; 19 May 1942 – 20 December 2011), born Joan Agnes Campanella in Butte, Montana, was an American cookbook author, best known for her 1987 International Association of Culinary Professionals/Seagram winning cookbook, Lord Krishna's Cuisine: The Art of Indian Vegetarian Cooking.

She was a senior member of the International Society for Krishna Consciousness (ISKCON).

== Life ==
Yamuna Devi was part of the early 1960s Beat Generation in North Beach, San Francisco before meeting A. C. Bhaktivedanta Swami Prabhupada in New York City in 1966; she became an initiated disciple in 1967. In 1968, with five other Hare Krishna followers, Devi flew to London to establish ISKCON in the United Kingdom. There, she helped introduce Beatles guitarist George Harrison to Gaudiya Vaishnava philosophy and practice. She sang co-lead vocals on the 1969 Apple Records "Hare Krishna Mantra" single, which reached number 12 in the UK Chart. She also sang lead vocals on the 1970 Apple Records "Govinda" single, which reached number 23 in the UK Chart. Both appeared on The Radha Krsna Temple album.

From 1970 to 1974, she lived and travelled in India with Srila Prabhupada as part of the World Sankirtan Party.

She has been cited as an inspiration by figures such as Jahnavi Harrison.

== Cookbooks ==
Food writer Russ Parsons wrote in the Los Angeles Times in 1999 that Lord Krishna's Cuisine: The Art of Indian Vegetarian Cooking "is an absolutely fabulous book and certainly not for vegetarians only. The food here is that of traditional Indian vegetarian cuisines--from Gujarat to Bengal, Kashmir to Kerala. It is inventive, exotic and subtle." Publishers Weekly described it as an "impressive volume" of "elegant dishes [that] might easily grace the most sophisticated table without a whisper of the pedestrian connotations sometimes associated with vegetarian cooking. A prodigious, 800-page labor of love illustrated with lovely, delicate line drawings."

- Lord Krishna's Cuisine: The Art of Indian Vegetarian Cooking. Dutton, 1987. ISBN 978-0525245643.
- The Best of Lord Krishna's Cuisine: Favorite Recipes from the Art of Indian Vegetarian Cooking. Penguin, 1991. ISBN 0-452-26683-1.(abridged version of Lord Krishna's Cuisine)
- Yamuna's Table: Healthful Vegetarian Cuisine Inspired by the Flavors of India. Dutton-Penguin Putnam, 1992. ISBN 978-0525934875.

=== Awards ===
| Year | Awards and honors | Book |
|---|---|---|
| 1993 | James Beard Foundation Award: International | Yamuna's Table: Healthy Vegetarian Cuisine Inspired by the Flavors of India (1992) |
| 1988 | IACP/Seagram Award: Cookbook of the Year | Lord Krishna's Cuisine: The Art of Indian Vegetarian Cooking (1987) |
