= Hare Krishna in popular culture =

Contributions to popular culture involving direct reference to the Hare Krishna mantra include the following.

== In music ==
=== Beatles influence ===
After coming in contact with the Hare Krishnas in 1969, some of the Beatles took an interest in the movement. This interest is reflected in songs recorded by the band and its members.

- The Hare Krishna mantra can be heard sung by George Harrison in the backing vocals of his song "My Sweet Lord" (1970), and the track "Living in the Material World" (1973) contains the lyrics: "I hope to get out of this place by the Lord Sri Krishna's grace. My salvation from the material world." Other Harrison songs that reference Krishna include "It Is 'He' (Jai Sri Krishna)" (1974), "Sat Singing" (1980) and "Life Itself" (1981). Harrison also chanted the Hare Krishna mantra when he was attacked by a man who broke into his home on 30 December 1999. Harrison survived the knife attack, and continued to praise Krishna for the remainder of his life. Of the four Beatles members, only Harrison was actually a Krishna devotee, and after he posthumously received a star on the Hollywood Walk of Fame in 2009, his son Dhani Harrison uttered out the phrase "Hare Krishna" during the ceremony.
- The mantra was released as a single by the Radha Krishna Temple (London) in August 1969 on the Beatles' Apple record label. This single, like the 1971 Radha Krsna Temple album, was produced by George Harrison.
- The words "Hare Krishna" are included in the lyrics of some of John Lennon's songs also, such as "Give Peace a Chance" (1969) and "I Am the Walrus" (1967). They can also be heard in the backing vocals of Ringo Starr's 1971 hit "It Don't Come Easy", which was again produced by Harrison and co-written by Starr and him (although originally credited to Starr only).
- A year and a half after Lennon's apparent adoption of the phrase in "Give Peace a Chance", his song "I Found Out" (from 1970's John Lennon/Plastic Ono Band album) contains a verse on Hare Krishna, dismissing it as "pie in the sky".

=== Music ===
- Jazz clarinetist Tony Scott released a song entitled "Homage to Lord Krishna" on his 1967 album, and a song entitled "Hare Krishna [Hail Krishna]" on his 1968 album Music for Yoga Meditation and Other Joys.
- The Fugs recorded "Hare Krishna" with Allen Ginsberg on their 1968 album Tenderness Junction.
- The Lord Rama mantra appears on The Stooges' 1969 song "We Will Fall" from their eponymous debut
- Bill Oddie recorded a parody in 1970 entitled "Harry Krishna" as the B-side to his "On Ilkla Moor Baht 'at". After leading a group in chanting the traditional mantra, they proceed to chant puns such as "Hare Secombe", "Harevederci Roma" and "Hare Corbett, Sweep and Sooty".
- Alice Coltrane included "Hare Krishna" on her 1971 album Universal Consciousness, and on her 1976 album Radha-Krsna Nama Sankirtana.
- Fleetwood Mac included "Hare Krishna" on their song Miles Away
- Marion Williams included "Hare Krishna" on her 1971 album Standing Here Wondering Which Way to Go.
- Ruth Copeland included "Hare Krishna" on her 1971 album I Am What I Am.
- Frank Zappa's track "The Meek Shall Inherit Nothing", from the 1981 album You Are What You Is, is a barbed takedown of devotion to religion. It includes the line "Is Hare Rama really wrong", followed by a description of devotee attire.
- Hüsker Dü's track "Hare Krsna", from the 1984 album Zen Arcade, is a song about a female member of the Hare Krishna movement. It references the Hare Krishna mantra.
- Rapper KRS-One was influenced by the Hare Krishna movement as a young man. His name derives from "Krishna".
- In their 1990 album DAAS Icon, Australian musical comedians the Doug Anthony All Stars featured a track titled "Krishna". The song presents a comedic take on the Hare Krishnas, but caused the album to be briefly banned in Britain due to a line about getting "Krishna and his shotgun to join the IRA."
- Boy George's track "Bow Down Mister" from 1991 includes the Hare Krishna mantra and other references to the Hare Krishnas. George was openly involved with the Hare Krishna movement, and members of ISKCON appeared in several of his stage performances.
- British Anarchist band Chumbawamba's song "Happiness Is Just a Chant Away" from their 1992 album Shhh ends with a parody of the Hare Krishna, instead chanting the name of cop-killer Harry Roberts.
- Kula Shaker include various Vedic mantras and names of Krishna in their songs, especially in the track "Govinda" from 1996. Lead-singer Crispian Mills named their band after the Vaishnava saint, Kulashekhara.
- Tenacious D created a song they played live about the Hare Krishnas, called "Hare Krishna".
- In 1996, rappers Bhakta Bruce and Bhakta Flesh, operating out of the Coral Gables, Fl temple, put out their album “Scam, Chant and Procreate.”
- The Auteurs have a song called "Sick of Hari Krisna" on their 1999 album How I Learned to Love the Bootboys, in which the title is sung repeatedly.
- When recreating Eric Clapton's 1964 Gibson ES-335 for production in 2005, there was a Hare Krishna sticker which had been given to him by George Harrison on the back of the headstock that was reproduced on the 2005 models.
- Thievery Corporation have a track entitled "Hare Krsna" (featuring Seu Jorge) on their album Radio Retaliation, which was nominated for Best Recording Package Grammy in 2008.
- The Pretenders include a verse about Krishna and reference the mantra in the lyrics to "Boots of Chinese Plastic" on the 2008 album Break Up the Concrete.
- In 2011, Sir Ivan released a hit single named "Hare Krishna" which contained the Hare Krishna mantra.
- In 2012 Rapper N.O.R.E. made a track called Hare Krishna featuring the RZA from the Wu-Tang Clan.
- Brazilian singer Nando Reis released "Mantra" (2003) as a partnership with fellow Titãs member Arnaldo Antunes. The song features a group of Hare Krishna musicians and singers from a temple in Teresópolis and prominently features Sanskrit mantras.
- Boards of Canada's track "Naraka" from their 2026 album Inferno features the Hare Krishna mantra.

=== Straight Edge subculture ===
In the 1980s, several bands and individuals from the punk-related straight edge subculture took interest in the Hare Krishna doctrines, leading to a number of straight edgers becoming official members of the movement. Due to the influence of a Hare Krishna named Larry Pugliese, Krishna Consciousness found its way into the New York hardcore scene in the mid-1980s and became known as Krishnacore.

Early devotees included John Joseph and Harley Flanagan of the band Cro-Mags, Caine Rose and Jai Nitai Holzman of Fed Up!, Ray Cappo of Youth of Today, and Vic DiCara, former guitarist for Los Angeles band Inside Out, who established quite possibly the most famous of all of the newly dubbed bands, namely 108.

=== Mantra-Rock Dance ===
This concert in the San Francisco of the hippie era took place at the Avalon Ballroom on January 29, 1967. American poet Allen Ginsberg and the likes of The Grateful Dead, Janis Joplin, Jefferson Airplane and Moby Grape performed. Founder of the Hare Krishna movement, Prabhupada also entered the stage chanting the Hare Krishna mantra.

== In films ==
- The hippie-themed Hair (1967) contains the whole Hare Krishna chant as a song, and in the Miloš Forman film Hair (1979), Hare Krishna followers are depicted dancing and in addition to the chant singing about other subjects at a be-in: "Marijuana marijuana, Juana juana mari mari, Beads, flowers, freedom, happiness"
- Hare Krishnas have been on the receiving end of several jokes in Zucker, Abrahams and Zucker comedy films including The Kentucky Fried Movie (1977) and Airplane! (1980), in which two Hare Krishna devotees are asked to contribute to "The Church of Religious Consciousness." Their deadpan reply: "We gave at the office."
- Hare Rama Hare Krishna (1971), a Hindi movie which centers around the hippie invasion of Kathmandu, Nepal. The film also features the Hindi hit song "Dum Maro Dum", which includes the chant "Hare Krishna Hare Ram".
- In the John Waters movie Female Trouble (1974), Taffy (Mink Stole) returns home and announces she is joining the "Hare Krishna people", and Dawn (Divine) warns her she will kill her if she does. Later, Dawn performs several crimes including knocking her daughter unconscious with a chair and later killing her for becoming a Hare Krishna.
- In the Cheech & Chong movie Up in Smoke (1978), police detectives attempt to infiltrate a battle of the bands contest dressed in robes taken from a group of Hare Krishnas.
- In ‘’The Muppet Movie’’ (1979), a running joke is when Kermit sees a lost boater in the beginning of the film say to him “I’m lost” to which Kermit replies “Have you tried Harry Krishna?” to which he chuckles. The next time the joke appears is when Fozzie Bear performs in El Sleazo Cafe Kermit sees him bombing and he says “This guy is lost.” to which someone else chimes in with a play on the religion “He should try Harry Krishna.”. Later on the joke appears one more time by having a sign outside a rundown church with the saying “Lost? Have you tried Rev. Harry Krishna?.
- In The Devil and Max Devlin (1981), a sankirtan van hits and kills the main character. The Hare Krishna devotees jump out of the van, surround the man who is dying, and perform a kirtan while the camera pans over their stricken expressions.
- In Stripes (1981), Russell (Harold Ramis) sings the Hare Krishna mantra to Ox (John Candy) in order to mock the latter's mandated military haircut.
- In Death Wish II (1982), actual Hare Krishnas who were found at filming locations for the movie in Los Angeles were hired to provide an authentic portrayal of the local population in the areas that were filmed.
- In Falling Down (1993), actual Hare Krishnas who were found at filming locations for the movie in Los Angeles were hired to provide an authentic portrayal of the local population in the areas that were filmed.
- Devotees performing a kirtan are briefly seen in Blade Runner (1982).
- In The Karate Kid (1984), Daniel (Ralph Macchio) mistakes a pair of deck sanders for bongos and he chants the Hare Krishna mantra while doing so.
- In Hannah and Her Sisters (1986), Mickey Sachs, played by Woody Allen, contemplates joining the Hare Krishna during a midlife crisis.
- In Miami Blues (1990), the lead character (played by Alec Baldwin) breaks the finger of a Hare Krishna in the Miami airport, causing him to go into shock and die, and this leads to the police search for Baldwin's character.
- In National Lampoon's Senior Trip (1995), one of the characters, Herbert Jones, becomes a Hare Krishna after graduating high school.
- In Final Destination (2000), at 6:30, a Hare Krishna devotee at an airport distributes a magazine with a death-related title, foreboding the tragic events that follow.
- In 2001’s Osmosis Jones, as the titular character enters the stomach, several red blood cells are shown to be Hare Krishna members.
- Aaron Naumann, a character in the film Bee Season (2005), becomes a Hare Krishna after rejecting Judaism.
- In Tracy Chapman's music video "Telling Stories" (2009, Atlantic Records) a man dressed first in a black jacket with sunglasses on enters the bus, then he sits down and he is seen praying. His bald head, orange (saffron) robes and his prayer beads (mala) as well as a small booklet are an indication that he is a Hare Krishna devotee.

== In television ==
- In an episode of Lou Grant (episode #18, "Sect", February 6, 1978), Charlie's son joins the Hare Krishna movement, taking the name "Vishnu das".
- Mad TV included a sketch called "Krishna Rock" (Season 1, Episode 105, November 11, 1995). The skit takes place at an airport where four Hare Krishnas in orange robes are chanting and dancing when one of them decides to leave the group for a girl but ends up begging to be allowed back in the group.
- Comedian Ross Noble devoted a portion his show Unrealtime (2003) to discussing an encounter he once had with some Krishnas, a tramp and a London bus.
- In a fifth-season episode of Mad Men ("Christmas Waltz," May 20, 2012), set in late 1966, it is revealed that the character Paul Kinsey (played by Michael Gladis) has joined the Hare Krishna movement. He is depicted as having shaved his head and participates in early ISKCON meetings led by Prabhupada in New York City.
- The Hare Krishna’s also appear in episode 17, season 5 of “[Scrubs]” titled (“My Chopped Liver”). JD shaves his head and is subsequently misidentified as a follower, and essentially joins the movement by accident. The typical Hare Krishna chant can be heard in the episode.
- In an episode of The Monkees Show, ("The Monkee's Paw," episode 51/season 2, episode 19) Hare Krishna is mentioned when they have "all the basics" written on a chalkboard to teach Micky Dolenz to talk again.
- In a few episodes of Gilmore Girls, they mention Hare Krishnas, as well as Hare Krishna.

== In fiction ==
- In The Face on the Milk Carton series (1990), Hannah, Janie's kidnapper, is a Hare Krishna. The movement is described within the first book in the context of a cult.
- In the novel Bee Season (2000) by Myla Goldberg, the character Aaron Naumann joins the local ISKCON temple after rejecting Judaism.
- In Daniel Pinkwater's zany 1978 young adult satire The Last Guru, Hare Krishna was parodied as the "Hairy Cricket."
