= Krishna, the Supreme Personality of Godhead =

Book by A.C. Bhaktivedanta Swami Praphupada

New front cover. Copyright BBT

Kṛṣṇa, the Supreme Personality of Godhead, also known as the KRSNA Book, is a summary and commentary on the Tenth Canto of the Śrīmad Bhāgavatam by A. C. Bhaktivedanta Swami Prabhupada, founder-acharya of the International Society for Krishna Consciousness (ISKCON). It was published in 1970 by the Bhaktivedanta Book Trust. The publication was financed through a contribution of $19,000 from Beatle, George Harrison, who also wrote the book's foreword.

== Background and publication ==
In 1967, A. C. Bhaktivedanta Swami Prabhupada had experienced a severe heart attack and wondered whether he would live to present the world with a translated version of the "divine pastimes" of Krishna on earth. Prabhupada had translated the Second Canto of the Śrīmad Bhāgavatam, but knew that many years of work remained before he would reach the Tenth Canto, where these accounts of Krishna are contained. He therefore decided to write Krishna, the Supreme Personality of Godhead, also known as KRSNA Book, before undertaking the remaining cantos.

Once Prabhupada had completed the manuscript, he requested that Shyamsundar Das, one of the founding devotees of the Radha Krishna Temple in London, ask George Harrison of the Beatles if he would finance its publication. The sum required was $19,000 for an initial print run of 5000 copies.

Harrison's support for the Hare Krishna movement had been crucial to the establishment of ISKCON's UK operation in 1969, and his production of the London devotees' hit single "Hare Krishna Mantra" had promoted ISKCON and the 5000-year-old Maha Mantra worldwide. Shyamsundar was loath to impose further on Harrison, but Prabhupada insisted, saying: "You will see. Krishna will help you to say it." The acharya also emphasised the importance of the book since, although Krishna's name was now being heard throughout the West, people had no knowledge of the deity's life or his physical appearance.

Shyamsundar passed on Prabhupada's request during dinner at the house of the London sculptor David Wynne, who had just helped Harrison choose a marble slab for an altar he was donating to the new temple. The devotee recalls that a thunderstorm raged outside that evening, and Harrison's reaction became "grimmer and grimmer" as it became clear that he was being asked to provide further financial assistance. In Shyamsundar's account, there was then a flash of lightning outside, accompanied by a loud clap of thunder, and all the lights in the house went out. When the power had been restored, Harrison said, "Well, there's no arguing with that, is there?" and agreed to finance the publication.

Harrison authorised the printing in March 1970. The book was printed in Japan by the company Dai Nippon, with advance copies arriving in England by May that year.

== Contents ==
The Tenth Canto of the Bhāgavatam details the activities and pastimes of Krishna at Vrindavan. Within this book, Swami Prabhupada describes the historical events that occurred approximately 5000 years ago.

The book included 54 pages of colour illustrations, with a painting on the front cover that depicted Krishna with his consort Radha. Author Joshua Greene writes of this first edition: "It was massive – a foot tall, weighing two pounds, and running [to] almost four hundred pages … The book was mysterious and beautiful."

Prabhupada invited Harrison to supply the foreword, which begins: "Everybody is looking for Krishna. Some don't realize that they are, but they are." According to Greene, since 1970, KRSNA Book has been translated into twenty languages and has sold over 5 million copies.

== See also ==
- Acintya Bheda Abheda
- Bhagavata
- Gopala Tapani Upanishad
- Hare Krishna (mantra)
- Krishna
- Krishnology
- Para Brahman
- Narayana
- Radha
- Svayam Bhagavan
- Vasudeva
- Vedanta
- Vishnu

== Sources ==
- Clayson, Alan (2003). George Harrison. London: Sanctuary. ISBN 1-86074-489-3.
- Dwyer, Graham; Cole, Richard J. (2007). The Hare Krishna Movement: Forty Years of Chant and Change. New York, NY: I.B. Tauris. ISBN 978-1-84511-407-7.
- Greene, Joshua M. (2006). Here Comes the Sun: The Spiritual and Musical Journey of George Harrison. Hoboken, NJ: John Wiley & Sons. ISBN 978-0-470-12780-3.
- Lavezzoli, Peter (2006). The Dawn of Indian Music in the West. New York, NY: Continuum. ISBN 0-8264-2819-3.
- Muster, Nori J. (2001). Betrayal of the Spirit: My Life Behind the Headlines of the Hare Krishna Movement. Champaign, IL: University of Illinois Press. ISBN 0-252-06566-2.
- A. C. Bhaktivedanta Swami (1970). Kṛṣṇa, the Supreme Personality of Godhead. Bhaktivedanta Book Trust.
- Tillery, Gary (2011). Working Class Mystic: A Spiritual Biography of George Harrison. Wheaton, IL: Quest Books. ISBN 978-0-8356-0900-5.
