= Radha Krishna Temple =

Headquarter of ISKCON in United Kingdom

Radha-Krishna Temple (London)
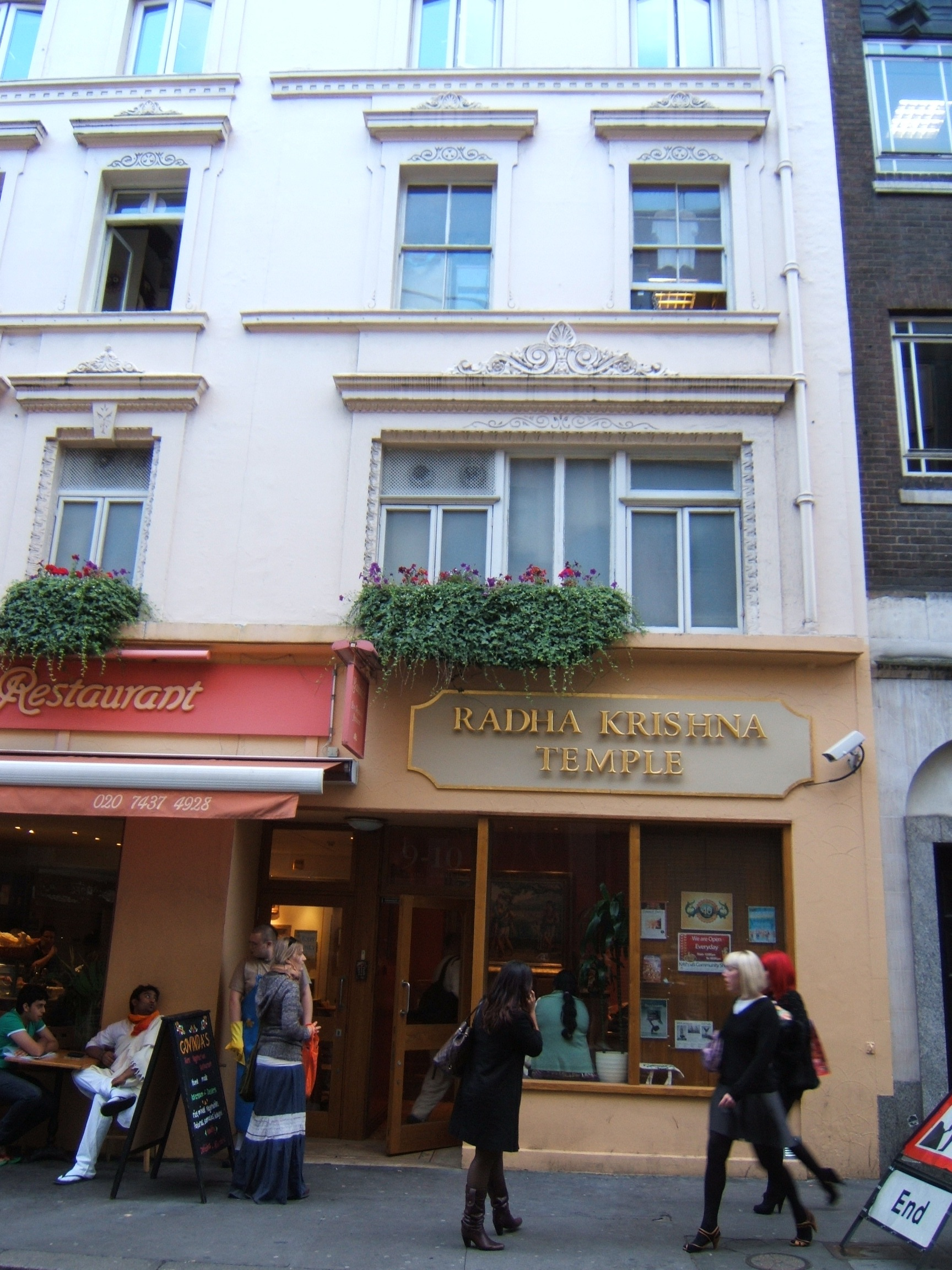
- ISKCON Radha-Krishna Temple, central London, 2009

Background information
- Also known as: ISKCON London
- Origin: London, England
- Genres: Devotional; Indian
- Years active: 1969–present
- Label: Apple
- Past members: Principal: Mukunda; Yamuna; Shyamsundar; Gurudas; Janaki; Malati; Other: Harivilas; Isham; Tamal Krishna; Yogesvara
- Website: iskcon.london

The Radha-Krishna Temple (also Radha-Krsna Temple) has been the headquarters of the International Society for Krishna Consciousness (ISKCON) in the United Kingdom since the late 1960s. It was founded in Bury Place, Bloomsbury, by six devotees from San Francisco's Radha-Krishna Temple, who were sent by ISKCON leader A.C. Bhaktivedanta Swami Prabhupada to establish a UK branch of the movement in 1968. The Temple came to prominence through George Harrison of the Beatles publicly aligning himself with Krishna consciousness. Among the six initial representatives in London, devotees Mukunda, Shyamsundar and Malati all went on to hold senior positions in the rapidly growing ISKCON organisation.

As Radha-Krishna Temple (London), the Temple devotees recorded an album of devotional music with Harrison, which was issued on the Beatles' Apple record label in 1971. Among these recordings were "Hare Krishna Mantra", an international hit single in 1969 that helped popularise the Maha Mantra in the West, and "Govinda". With Harrison's financial support, the Radha-Krishna Temple secured its first permanent premises, at Bury Place in central London, then acquired a country property in Hertfordshire, known as Bhaktivedanta Manor. In 1979, following legal proceedings over the use of the Bury Place site, the central London temple moved to new premises in Soho Square.

== Background ==
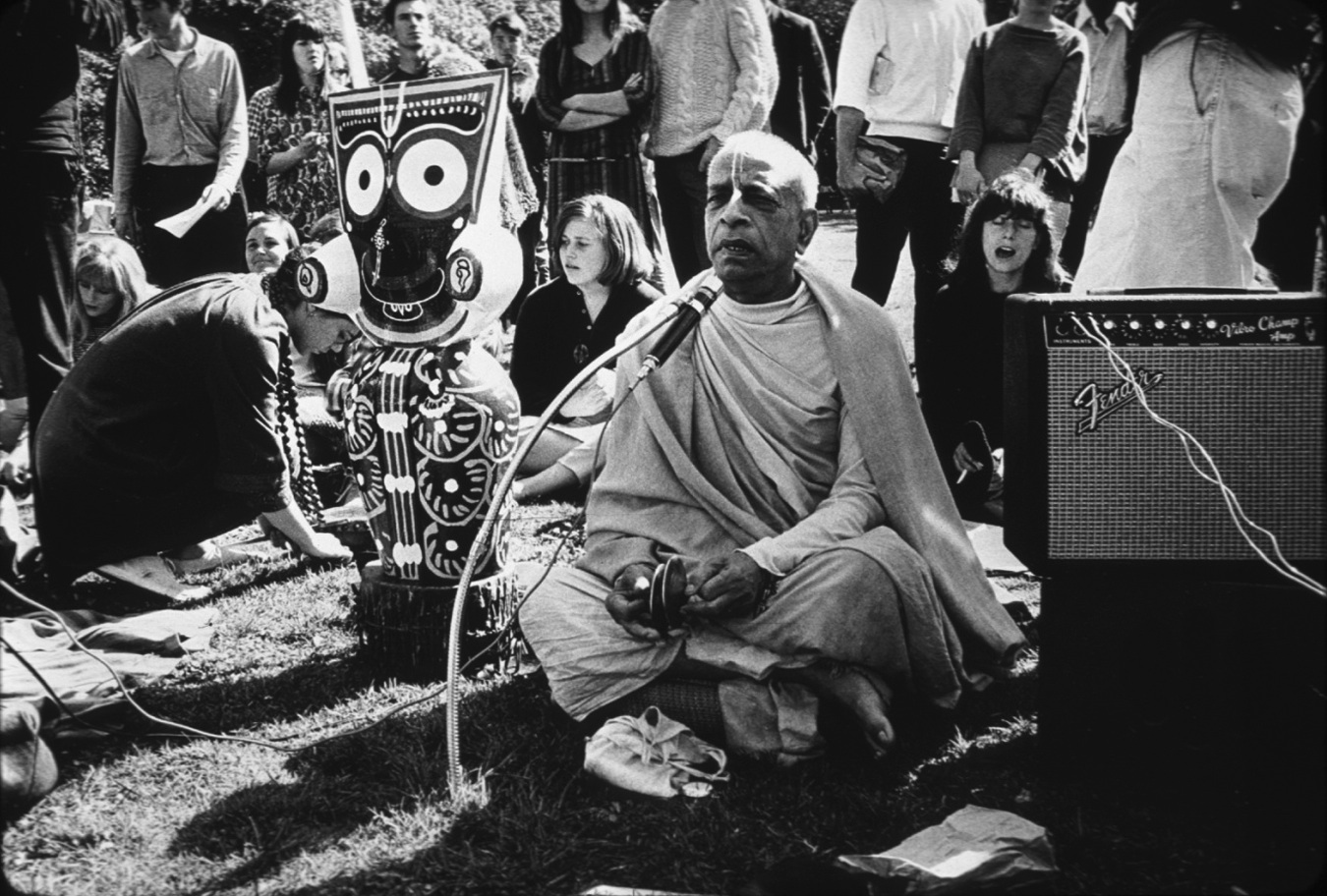
Prabhupada (with the deity of Jagannath to his right) chanting in San Francisco's Golden Gate Park in February 1967

As founder and acharya (leader) of the International Society for Krishna Consciousness (ISKCON), A.C. Bhaktivedanta Swami Prabhupada established the first Radha-Krishna Temple in New York in 1966, followed by a branch in the Haight-Ashbury district of San Francisco. In 1968, as the movement continued to expand in North America, he asked three married couples who had served at the San Francisco temple to establish a base in England. One of the devotees, Shyamsundar Das, later explained that "The scene, the centre of activity, was shifting from San Francisco to London [in 1968]", and that the 72-year-old Prabhupada was drawn to having a base in the United Kingdom due to his upbringing as "an Indian in the British Empire".

Formerly known as Sam Speerstra, and a Fulbright Scholar who had worked as a professional skier, Shyamsundar was accompanied by his wife, Malati Dasi, and their baby daughter, Saraswati. Also among the six devotees was Shyamsundar's friend from Reed College, Mukunda Das – formerly Michael Grant, a New York session musician and pianist with jazz saxophonist Pharoah Sanders – and Mukunda's wife, Janaki. In October 1966, Shyamsundar and Malati had been working for the US Forest Service in Oregon at a fire lookout post when Mukunda and Janaki visited them and awakened their interest in Prabhupada's Gaudiya Vaishnava teachings. The third couple was Gurudas and Yamuna. Before joining the Hare Krishna movement, Gurudas had spent five years in Alabama as one of Martin Luther King Jr.'s human rights supporters and then worked among San Francisco's underprivileged communities.

== Early months in London ==
After arriving in Britain, the three couples lived in separate accommodation across London and struggled financially. They met to perform their missionary activities – which included kirtans (public chanting), attending notable public events, the distribution of promotional leaflets in busy areas such as Oxford Street, and the cultivation of new members. Having previously relied on the generosity of the local Indian community, they eventually settled in a warehouse complex in Covent Garden, which also served as their temporary temple. Malati later recalled of this early period in England: "[We had] hardly any possessions, no money, no protection. It often got very cold … All we had was love for Srila Prabhupada."

To gain wider recognition for their message, Shyamsundar had the idea of meeting the Beatles and asking them to introduce the Hare Krishna mantra, or Maha Mantra, into their songs. In October 1968, Mukunda and Shyamsundar went to the band's Apple Records offices, on Savile Row, where Peter Asher subsequently passed a recommendation on to George Harrison, the Beatle most interested in Indian philosophy and culture. The following month, the devotees' public appearances in Oxford Street received national attention in London's Times newspaper. The article carried a quote from Gurudas that read: "Hare Krishna is a chant that sets God dancing on your tongue. Try chanting 'Queen Elizabeth, Queen Elizabeth' and see the difference."

=== Meeting George Harrison ===
With Harrison busy finishing the band's double album The Beatles and then undertaking a two-month trip to America, the meeting between him and Shyamsundar took place at Apple in December. Harrison was aware of the devotees of Krishna, having first experienced kirtana while in Vrindavan in September 1966; he had also enjoyed Prabhupada's album Krishna Consciousness and had begun chanting the Maha Mantra, sometimes with John Lennon. When they met in December 1968, Harrison greeted Shyamsundar with the words: "Hare Krishna. Where have you been? I've been waiting [years] to meet you."

Harrison subsequently visited the devotees at their warehouse. At a time when he felt a degree of isolation within the Beatles, following his bandmates' mixed experiences on Maharishi Mahesh Yogi's Transcendental Meditation course in Rishikesh, India, Harrison told the devotees, "I'm inspired here." He introduced Shyamsundar to the other Beatles in January 1969, in an effort to curb the friction that enveloped the band during their film project Let It Be, and the devotees became regular visitors to both his house in Surrey and the Apple offices.

== Recording for Apple Records ==
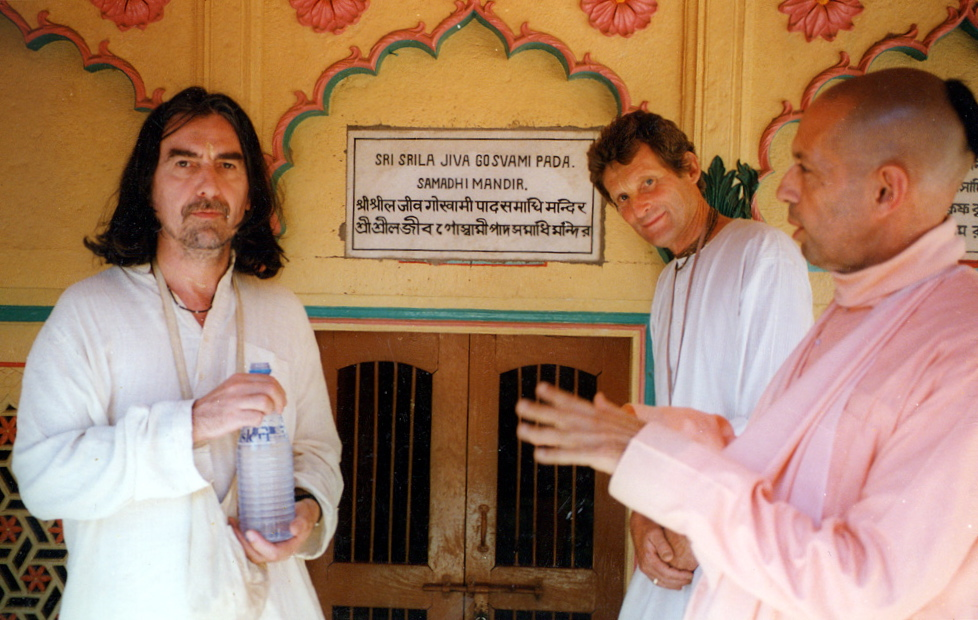
Harrison, Shyamsundar and Mukunda in the Hindu holy city of Vrindavan in 1996

As a director of Apple, Harrison valued the record label as a means to working with acts other than the Beatles. In July 1969, he invited the devotees to Abbey Road Studios to make a recording of the Maha Mantra for release as a single. Harrison produced and performed on the song, for which Mukunda provided the musical arrangement and played mrdanga, and Yamuna and Shyamsundar served as lead vocalists. Malati, Janaki, Gurudas and others joined in as chorus singers, (Note: An Apple Records employee at the time, Chris O'Dell recalls that there were "perhaps a dozen Krishnas" on the recording.) in addition to playing percussive instruments such as kartal.

Released by Apple Records in August, and credited to Radha-Krishna Temple (London), "Hare Krishna Mantra" peaked at number 12 on the UK's national singles chart and was a commercial success around the world. The devotees twice performed the song on BBC-TV's Top of the Pops. The 11 October issue of the New Musical Express announced that, in addition to supporting the rock band Humble Pie at London's Royal Festival Hall, the Radha-Krishna Temple would be performing eleven concerts at the Holborn Conway Hall between 15 October and 22 December, for which audiences were encouraged to bring their own musical instruments and participate. The same report said that further performances were scheduled in Oxford, at the Revolution Club in London, and in Amsterdam. The Temple devotees went on to play concerts across Europe to meet public demand. Mukunda later said: "We went from street people to celebrity status. Overnight."

Aided by the association with Harrison, the single established the ancient mantra in the cultural mainstream, while also attracting many new members to ISKCON's centres. For the growing London branch, this achievement was accompanied by a more tolerant attitude from a previously wary public. In addition, in the Gaudiya Vaishnava faith, the international popularity of the Temple's recording was viewed as the fulfilment of a prediction by the Hare Krishna movement's sixteenth-century avatar, Chaitanya Mahaprabhu, who had written: "One day, the chanting of the holy names of God will be heard in every town and village of the world."

== Establishing the London temple, and Prabhupada's first visit ==
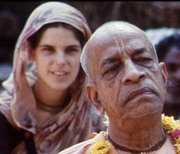
Malati with Prabhupada in Vrindavan in 1975

Prabhupada was pleased with his disciples' progress but had stated that he would only visit London once they had established a formal ISKCON temple. For this purpose, Mukunda found a seven-storey premises at 7 Bury Place, close to the British Museum in London's Bloomsbury area, for which Harrison was co-signee on the lease and helped fund. Gurudas has spoken of the problems the devotees experienced, with complaints being made against them by their former neighbours, and objections being raised by members of the community at Bury Place, and that it was only through Harrison's guarantee that they were able to secure the new site.

With the building in a state of disrepair, Lennon offered the Temple devotees temporary accommodation on his recently purchased estate, Tittenhurst Park, near Ascot, while renovations were underway at Bury Place. The devotees occupied the servants' quarters at Tittenhurst Park, close to the main house, and assisted in their hosts' renovation of the 72-acre property.

In September 1969, Prabhupada finally came to visit the new UK base, reuniting with his disciples and meeting Harrison and Lennon for the first time. Held in a former recital hall in the grounds of Tittenhurst Park, Prabhupada's meeting with the two Beatles and Yoko Ono, Lennon's wife, led to a philosophical discussion about topics such as the Bhagavad Gita, mantras and Krishna. Their conversation was taped by Shyamsundar and later made available as Lennon '69: Search for Liberation, the first publication in Mukunda's Vedic Contemporary Library Series. Of the two bandmates, Lennon was the one most impressed with Prabhupada initially. Harrison, who was preoccupied with news that his mother had been taken severely ill, later admitted to having underestimated the acharya at first.

Prabhupada stayed in a guesthouse at Tittenhurst Park, at Lennon's invitation. The recital hall – which had been one of the locations for what would turn out to be the Beatles' final photo shoot as a band, on 22 August 1969 – became known as "the Tittenhurst Temple" from this point.

In what Gurudas would deem "not the best move", the devotees' numbers had been bolstered with some recent recruits who provided a disruptive influence. (Note: Gurudas described these newcomers as "just a hair short of lunatic".) As a result, Prabhupada's followers "outstayed their welcome" at Lennon's home, according to author Alan Clayson, while Joshua Greene writes of the devotees later recalling "few … friendly exchanges with their hosts" there, compared to the warm relationship they shared with Harrison.

In December 1969, Prabhupada and the devotees – which now numbered 25, in Gurudas' estimation – moved into the new Radha-Krishna Temple at Bury Place. The location allowed for easy access to Oxford Street, which continued to be the Krishnas' main area of interaction with the public in central London. Harrison donated the temple's altar, which was made of Siena marble selected by his sculptor friend David Wynne.

== Prabhupada and Harrison ==
Harrison came to revere Prabhupada as a teacher and a friend, as well as "a perfect example of everything he preached". Harrison was particularly taken with the guru's insistence that he was merely a servant of God, telling Mukunda in 1982:

A lot of people say, "I'm it. I'm the divine incarnation. I'm here and let me hip you." … But Prabhupada was never like that … I always liked his humility and his simplicity: "the servant of the servant of the servant" is really what it is, you know. None of us are God – [we're] just His servants.

Harrison once asked Prabhupada if he should also shave his head and formally become a devotee, to which the acharya replied that he could do more for Krishna through his music. When Prabhupada heard Harrison's orchestrated version of the Govindam prayers for the first time, in Radha-Krishna Temple (London)'s 1970 single "Govinda", he was moved to tears and asked for the song to be played every morning during the daily greeting of the deities, or darshan arati. This practice continues today, at all ISKCON centres around the world.

== 1970 activities ==
The Temple members made other devotional recordings with Harrison in 1970, for an intended album, while keeping up their schedule of live performances. Among the latter were concerts with Joe Cocker, Deep Purple and the Moody Blues, and an appearance at the Midnight Sun Festival in Stockholm, Sweden, in June. An organ player in his university band, Joshua Greene joined the London temple during the 1969–70 holiday season, taking the devotee name Yogesvara. Tamal Krishna, a flute player, was among the members of ISKCON's American centres who also joined the London chapter over this period.

The devotees again appeared on Top of the Pops to promote "Govinda". Richard Williams of Melody Maker described their performance as "a fresh wind blowing in the midst of turgid dishonesty"; he added: "There they were – a dozen or so people with happiness on their faces, completely unselfconscious, radiating a weird inner strength of the kind which easily unsettles less secure people, even those of a so-called 'enlightened' generation." Sung primarily by Yamuna, "Govinda" peaked at number 23 in the UK.

Greene has written of the devotees "jok[ing] about a Harrison Bat-Light", whereby, in a scenario akin to the comic-book stories of Batman, the Beatles' guitarist would summon his Krishna friends at a moment's notice, and "off they would go on another adventure". One such moment, in March 1970, was when he, Shyamsundar and others travelled to Paris, where the local authorities had displayed hostility towards ISKCON's fledgling branch. Amid a chaotic press conference at Maxim's restaurant, this gesture increased Harrison's public affiliation with the movement, as did his financing of Prabhupada's 400-page book Krishna, the Supreme Personality of Godhead, for which he also wrote a foreword.

That same spring, Harrison invited three families from the London temple to stay at his newly purchased Oxfordshire estate, Friar Park, where they helped restore the property's parkland and formal gardens. The devotees' arrival at Friar Park sated Harrison's love of chanting and inspired themes on his first post-Beatles solo album, All Things Must Pass (1970), but left his wife, Pattie Boyd, feeling increasingly isolated. While Boyd welcomed Shyamsundar's presence, as the leader of this group, she and others close to Harrison were disturbed by the devotees' approach to childrearing when a young boy twice came close to drowning in the property's fountains.

== Apple Records album ==
Yamuna suggested to Prabhupda that the Radha Krishna Temple (London) album might be released "in time for Christmas [1970]", with the title Bhaja Hunre Mana, Mana Hu Re. Apple issued it as The Radha Krsna Temple, in May 1971, compiling the two hit singles with new tracks, one of which was the eight-minute "Bhaja Hunre Mana".

The album cover depicted the deities situated in the Bury Place temple. Mukunda was again credited (as Mukunda Das Adhikary) for the musical arrangements. Two months after its release, Shyamsundar and other devotees were present during rehearsals for Harrison's Concert for Bangladesh benefit shows in New York, where they supplied prasadam for the musicians and crew. (Note: Harrison told Shyamsundar that he had considered including a kirtan in the concerts, but having a set of Indian classical music performed by Ravi Shankar and Ali Akbar Khan was "already too much Far East stuff for most people".)

The album was subsequently released as Goddess of Fortune on the Spiritual Sky record label and again through the Prabhupada-founded Bhaktivedanta Book Trust. Following an initial CD release on Apple Records in 1993, The Radha Krsna Temple was remastered and reissued in October 2010 as part of Apple's ongoing reissue campaign, and featured in the sixteen-disc Apple Box Set.

== Bhaktivedanta Manor and the founding devotees' later careers ==
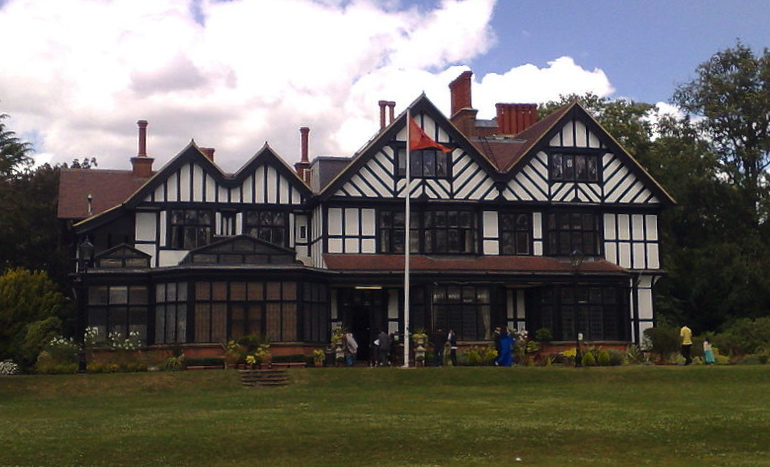
Bhaktivedanta Manor temple

ISKCON's London chapter continued to grow during the early 1970s, such that by 1972 the temple at Bury Place became too small to accommodate all its members. Harrison once more offered to help, and instructed Scottish-born devotee Dhananjaya to purchase a 17-acre property in Hertfordshire, close to London, on his behalf. Harrison donated the property, subsequently named Bhaktivedanta Manor, to the movement in February 1973. In addition to serving as the new UK headquarters, Bhaktivedanta Manor has since become one of the most popular Krishna temples in Europe. Out of appreciation for Harrison's various contributions, Prabhupada called him ISKCON's "archangel". In 1979, following legal proceedings over the use of the Bury Place site, the central London temple moved to a new premises at Soho Square. The Radha-Krishna deities were installed there and became known as "Radha-Londonishvara".

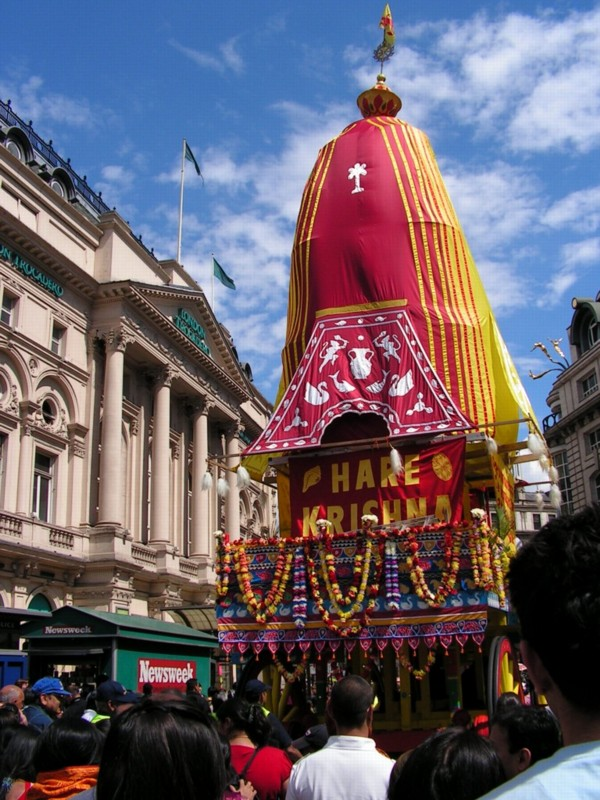
A Ratha-Yatra festival procession in central London

In their book on the first four decades of the Hare Krishna movement, authors Graham Dwyer and Richard Cole describe the three couples who founded the UK mission as "pioneer devotees". By 1971, when he met Harrison in New York before the Concert for Bangladesh, Shyamsundar had become Prabhupada's assistant, accompanying the acharya as he continued to propagate Krishna Consciousness around the world. The London temple hosted a visit by Prabhupada in July 1973, when Shyamsundar arranged a procession through the city to celebrate the annual Hindu Ratha-Yatra festival. From Marble Arch and ending at Trafalgar Square via Piccadilly, the acharya walked the whole route, dancing and chanting in front of a chariot carrying the deities of Jagannath, Balarama and Subhadra. Prabhupada's strength amazed his devotees, since he had been diagnosed with dysentery the previous week, while in Calcutta, and was considered to be too sick to travel.

Gurudas and Yamuna were based in Vrindaban in early 1974, where Gurudas was overseeing the construction of ISKCON's centre there. While Janaki left both Mukunda and the Hare Krishna movement, Mukunda ran the UK centres until relocating to Los Angeles in 1976, four years after which he founded the organisation's public relations department. Like Malati, Mukunda served on ISKCON's Governing Body Commission; in Malati's case, her 1998 appointment provided a breakthrough for gender equality within the movement.

== See also ==
- Hare Krishna in popular culture
