= Mukunda Goswami =

American ISKCON guru (born 1942)

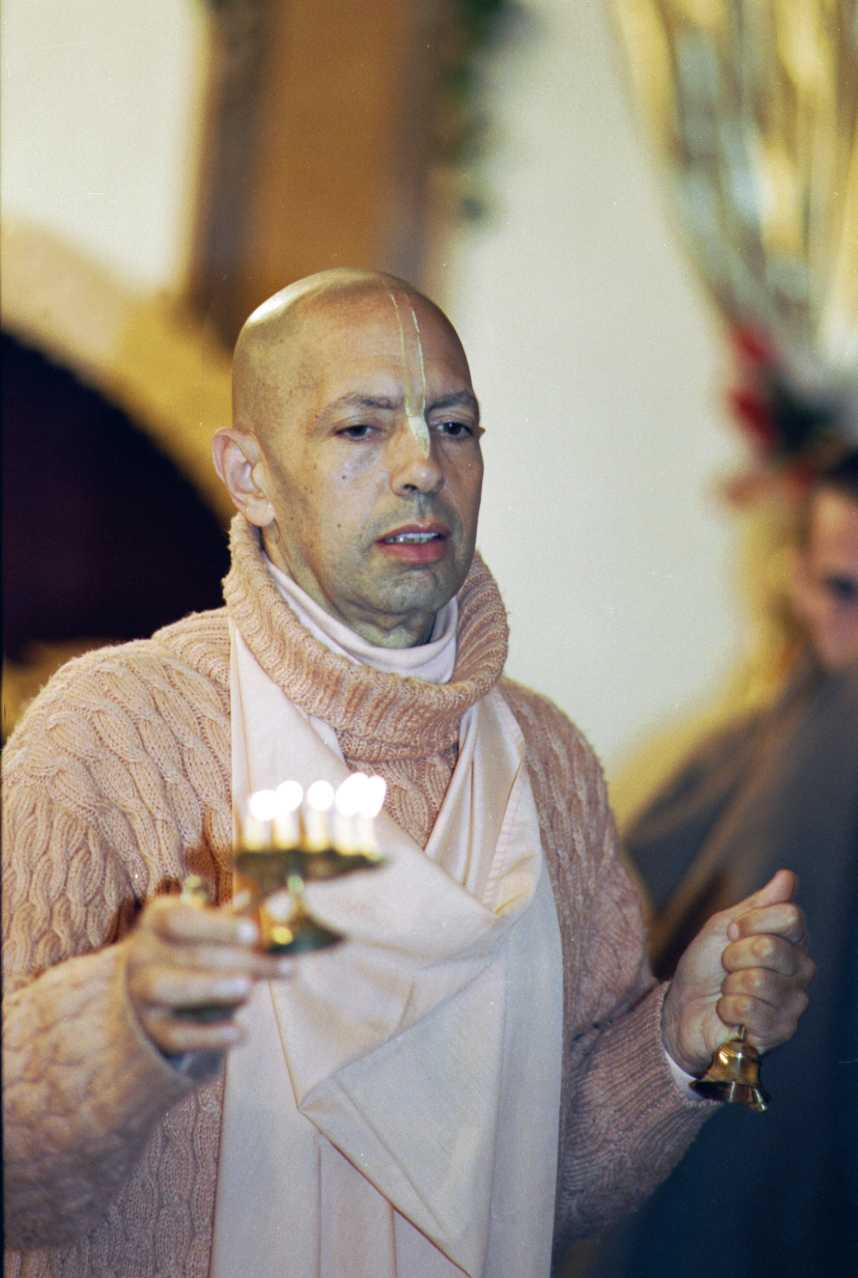
- Goswami in 1997

Personal life
- Born: Michael Grant; April 10, 1942 (age 84) Portland, Oregon, U.S.
- Website: http://www.mukundagoswami.org/

Religious life
- Religion: Hinduism
- Initiation: Diksa–1966, Sannyasa–1982

Religious career
- Post: ISKCON Guru, Sannyasi, Member of the Governing Body Commission (1984–1999)

Sanskrit name
- Sanskrit: मुकुन्द गोस्वामी

Mukunda Goswami (Sanskrit: मुकुन्द गोस्वामी; born Michael Grant, April 10, 1942) is a spiritual leader (guru) in the International Society for Krishna Consciousness (popularly known as ISKCON or the Hare Krishnas).

== Early life ==
Mukunda Goswami was born as Michael Grant in Portland, Oregon. After graduating from Reed College he became a professional jazz musician and moved to New York to pursue his music career. In 1965 Michael met the Hare Krishna founder A. C. Bhaktivedanta Swami Prabhupada. The next year he was in the first group of initiated disciples, receiving the Sanskrit name Mukunda Dasa.

Mukunda was a pioneer in the early days of the Hare Krishna movement. In 1966 in New York City he helped Bhaktivedanta Swami rent a storefront for the first Hare Krishna temple. In 1967 he founded the first Hare Krishna temple in San Francisco and organized a major music event, the Mantra-Rock Dance.

== England, George Harrison, and Apple Records ==
A.C. Bhaktivedanta Swami Prabhupada sent Mukunda and wife, Janaki, and two other devotee couples to London in 1968, where they established ISKCON in England.

The devotees met Beatle George Harrison. As well as assisting them in opening the Radha Krishna Temple there, Harrison produced an album of their devotional music, titled The Radha Krsna Temple. The album was released on Apple Records in 1971. Mukunda (credited as Makunda Das Adhikary) wrote the musical arrangements for the songs. The Temple's 1969 hit single, "Hare Krishna Mantra", climbed the pop charts, including the UK Singles Chart. The devotees toured Europe and also appeared on England's Top of the Pops TV show. The song made the devotees famous and proved to be a significant event in establishing ISKCON in Europe. George Harrison considered Mukunda and the others who first came to England to be his lifelong friends.

== ISKCON public affairs ==
Mukunda established the ISKCON Communications Office in Los Angeles in 1977. Publications included the ISKCON World Review (starting in 1981) and a series of paperback books: Search for Liberation, Chant and Be Happy, Coming Back, and A Higher Taste vegetarian cookbook. Other publications included Who Are They? magazine, Omni magazine, and the ISKCON Communications Journal (ICJ). Mukunda Goswami is still an ICJ Advisory Board Member.

== Personal life and achievements ==
Mukunda's wife left him and ISKCON in England, and Mukunda never remarried. In 1982 he accepted Sannyasa (the renounced order of life) from Jayapataka Swami. From 1984 to 1999, Mukunda Goswami served on the Governing Body Commission as the ISKCON Minister of Communication. Whenever the ISKCON organization was mired in legal troubles Mukunda worked at damage control, but has since left the position in the hands of his assistants. The public relations effort has been based in Washington, DC, since the late 1990s. Mukunda lived in San Diego until the late 1990s, then moved to New Zealand, then to the ISKCON New Govardhana community, near Murwillumbah, NSW, Australia. Mukunda's brother, Tom Grant, is a jazz musician in Portland, Oregon.

== Publications ==
- Mukunda Goswami & Drutakarma Dasa. Chant and be Happy ... The Story of the Hare Krishna Mantra. — 1st ed. — Los Angeles, CA: Bhaktivedanta Book Trust, 1982. — xvi, 108 p. — (Contemporary Vedic Library Series). — ISBN 0-89213-118-7
- Mukunda Goswami. Coming Back: The Science of Reincarnation. — 1st ed. — Los Angeles, CA: Bhaktivedanta Book Trust, 1982. — xvii, 134 p. — (Contemporary Vedic Library Series). — ISBN 0-89213-114-4
- Mukunda Goswami & Drutakarma Dasa. The Higher Taste: A Guide to Gourmet Vegetarian Cooking and a Karma-Free Diet. — 1st ed. — Los Angeles, CA: Bhaktivedanta Book Trust, 1983. — xi, 156 p. — (Contemporary Vedic Library Series). — ISBN 0-89213-128-4
- Mukunda Goswami & Michael A. Cremo. Divine Nature: A Spiritual Perspective on the Environmental Crisis / Foreword by William McDonough. — 1st ed. — Los Angeles, CA: Bhaktivedanta Book Trust, 1995. — xx, 108 p. — ISBN 0-89213-297-3 (hc). — ISBN 0-89213-296-5 (pbk)
- Mukunda Goswami. Inside the Hare Krishna Movement: An Ancient Eastern Religious Tradition Comes of Age in the Western World / Foreword by Malory Nye. — 1st ed. — Badger, CA: Torchlight Publishing, 2001. — xxv, 278 p. — ISBN 1-887089-28-4
- Mukunda Goswami. Miracle on Second Avenue: Hare Krishna Arrives in the West: New York, San Francisco, and London, 1966–1969 — 1st ed. — Badger, CA: Torchlight Publishing, 2011. — 440 p. — ISBN 978-0-9817273-4-9
