= Living in the Material World: 50th Anniversary Edition =

Compilation album by George Harrison
- Released: 15 November 2024
- Genre: Rock
- Length: 1:32:20
- Label: Dark Horse
- Producers: Dhani Harrison; Olivia Harrison

George Harrison chronology
George Harrison – The Vinyl Collection (2017)	Living in the Material World: 50th Anniversary Edition (2024)

Living in the Material World: 50th Anniversary Edition is an expanded edition of George Harrison's 1973 album Living in the Material World. The reissue was released on 15 November 2024 and includes Dolby Atmos mixes by three time Grammy winning engineer and mixer Paul Hicks.

== Background ==
In 2020, Paul Hicks oversaw and mixed the 50th anniversary edition of George Harrison's 1970 album All Things Must Pass. In 2024, Hicks oversaw the mixing of the deluxe edition of Living in the Material World, which included alternate takes of every song on the album and "Miss O'Dell", as well as Harrison's version of Ringo Starr's "Sunshine Life for Me (Sail Away Raymond)" which was written by Harrison.

== Release and promotion ==
The compilation was released on 15 November 2024 and was promoted with a lyric video of take 18 of "Give Me Love (Give Me Peace on Earth)", and a music video for George Harrison's version of "Sunshine Life for Me (Sail Away Raymond)", the latter was also included as a 7" single in the box set.

== Reception ==
Professional ratings
Aggregate scores
Source	Rating
Metacritic	90/100
Review scores
Source	Rating
Classic Rock	4/5 stars
Clash	8/10
The Line of Best Fit	9/10
Pitchfork	8/10
Rolling Stone	4/5 stars
Uncut	5/5 stars

On Metacritic, the reissue has an aggregated review score of 90/100, indicating "universal acclaim" based on 8 critic reviews. Beatles author Kenneth Womack praised the remixed version as "affording the recordings with greater definition while being assiduously careful about maintaining the artist's five-decade-old vision". Uncut's Tom Pinnock similarly praised the remix's brightened orchestral parts, Harrison's "cleaner and sharper" vocals and "the album's peculiar air of dry, ascetic starkness is increased". In a four-star review for Rolling Stone, Rob Sheffield called the album Harrison's "most profoundly weird" but a "slept-on masterpiece" that gets a "long-overdue appreciation" with the 50th anniversary reissue. Writing for Clash magazine, Emma Harrison praised the box set for allowing listeners to digest Living in the Material World for the first time: "It encourages the listener to slow down, extend grace to one another and live in the moment. After all, it's what George would have wanted." In Pitchfork, Stephen Thomas Erlewine noted how the remix emphasises the "intimacy" of the original album. Still, he found the alternate takes "offer little more than subtle differences", but believed the additions of "Miss O'Dell" and "Sunshine Life for Me (Sail Away Raymond)" "add a dose of good cheer" that the original album lacked.

== Track listing ==
Disc one: Remix of original album

1. "Give Me Love (Give Me Peace on Earth)" – 3:36
2. "Sue Me, Sue You Blues" – 4:48
3. "The Light That Has Lighted the World" – 3:31
4. "Don't Let Me Wait Too Long" – 2:57
5. "Who Can See It" – 3:52
6. "Living in the Material World" – 5:31
7. "The Lord Loves the One (That Loves the Lord)" – 4:34
8. "Be Here Now" – 4:09
9. "Try Some, Buy Some" – 4:08
10. "The Day the World Gets 'Round" – 2:53
11. "That Is All" – 3:43

Disc two: Alternate takes and singles

1. "Give Me Love (Give Me Peace on Earth)" (Take 18; Acoustic Version) – 3:38
2. "Sue Me, Sue You Blues" (Take 5) – 4:23
3. "The Light That Has Lighted the World" (Take 13) – 3:54
4. "Don't Let Me Wait Too Long" (Take 49; Acoustic Version) – 2:57
5. "Who Can See It" (Take 93) – 4:01
6. "Living in the Material World" (Take 31) – 5:29
7. "The Lord Loves the One (That Loves the Lord)" (Take 3) – 4:31
8. "Be Here Now" (Take 8) – 4:16
9. "Try Some, Buy Some" (Alternative Version) – 4:28
10. "The Day the World Gets 'Round" (Take 22; Acoustic Version) – 5:07
11. "That Is All" (Take 24) – 3:45
12. "Miss O'Dell" (2024 Mix) – 2:33
13. "Sunshine Life for Me (Sail Away Raymond)" – 2:49

== Charts ==
Chart (2024)	Peak position
Austrian Albums (Ö3 Austria)	18
Belgian Albums (Ultratop Flanders)	87
Belgian Albums (Ultratop Wallonia)	79
German Albums (Offizielle Top 100)	12
Japanese Albums (Oricon)	50
Scottish Albums (Official Charts)	6
Swiss Albums (Schweizer Hitparade)	35
UK Albums (Official Charts)	46
