= Be Here Now (George Harrison song) =

Song by George Harrison

from the album Living in the Material World
- Published: Material World Charitable Foundation (administered by Harrisongs)
- Released: 30 May 1973
- Recorded: 12 October 1972
- Genre: Folk rock
- Length: 4:09
- Label: Apple
- Songwriter: George Harrison
- Producer: George Harrison

"Be Here Now" is a song by English musician George Harrison from his 1973 album Living in the Material World. The recording features a sparse musical arrangement and recalls Harrison's work with the Beatles during 1966–1968, through its Indian-inspired mood and use of sitar drone. Part of Harrison's inspiration for the song was the popular 1971 book Be Here Now by spiritual teacher Ram Dass – specifically, a story discussing the author's change in identity from a Western academic to following a guru in the Hindu faith. Some Harrison biographers interpret "Be Here Now" as a comment from him on the public's nostalgia for the past following the Beatles' break-up.

Harrison wrote the song in Los Angeles in 1971, while working on the soundtrack to the Ravi Shankar documentary Raga, and shortly before organising the Concert for Bangladesh. The recording took place in late 1972 at his Friar Park home, with musical contributions from Klaus Voormann, Nicky Hopkins, Gary Wright and Jim Keltner. Contrary to the song's message, its release coincided with heightened speculation regarding a possible Beatles reunion, following Harrison, Ringo Starr and John Lennon recording together in Los Angeles in March 1973.

"Be Here Now" has received critical attention for its dreamlike sound and the quality of Harrison's acoustic guitar playing. Stephen Holden of Rolling Stone described the track as a "meltingly lovely meditation-prayer", while author Ian Inglis views it as a moving musical expression of "the spiritual, scientific, and metaphysical implications of time". Singers Robyn Hitchcock, Ian Astbury, and Beck have each covered the song.

== Background and composition ==
In his 1980 autobiography, I, Me, Mine, George Harrison recalls coming up with the tune for "Be Here Now" while staying in Nichols Canyon, Los Angeles, in the spring of 1971. At the time, Harrison was in Los Angeles producing the soundtrack to Raga, an Apple Films documentary about Indian sitarist Ravi Shankar. The same visit led to Harrison staging the Concert for Bangladesh in New York that summer, following a plea from Shankar, a Bengali Hindu, that something be done to raise international awareness for refugees of the Bangladesh Liberation War. In his autobiography, Harrison says of writing the song: "I was almost falling asleep. I had the guitar in bed and the melody came fast." In keeping with this description, the mood and melody of "Be Here Now" have a meditative and dreamlike quality.

The song is in the musical key of A, with a time signature of 4/4 throughout. According to his handwritten note on the lyrics reproduced in I, Me, Mine, Harrison played the guitar part in open G tuning – which would typically require the placing of a capo on the guitar's second fret, to attain an open chord of A major. Author and music journalist Paul Trynka writes of "Be Here Now" containing "modal folk riffs". The composition includes a recurring guitar motif, played over the chords of A major and A major 7, and is structured into two sections of verse separated by a middle eight.

== Lyrical inspiration and interpretation ==
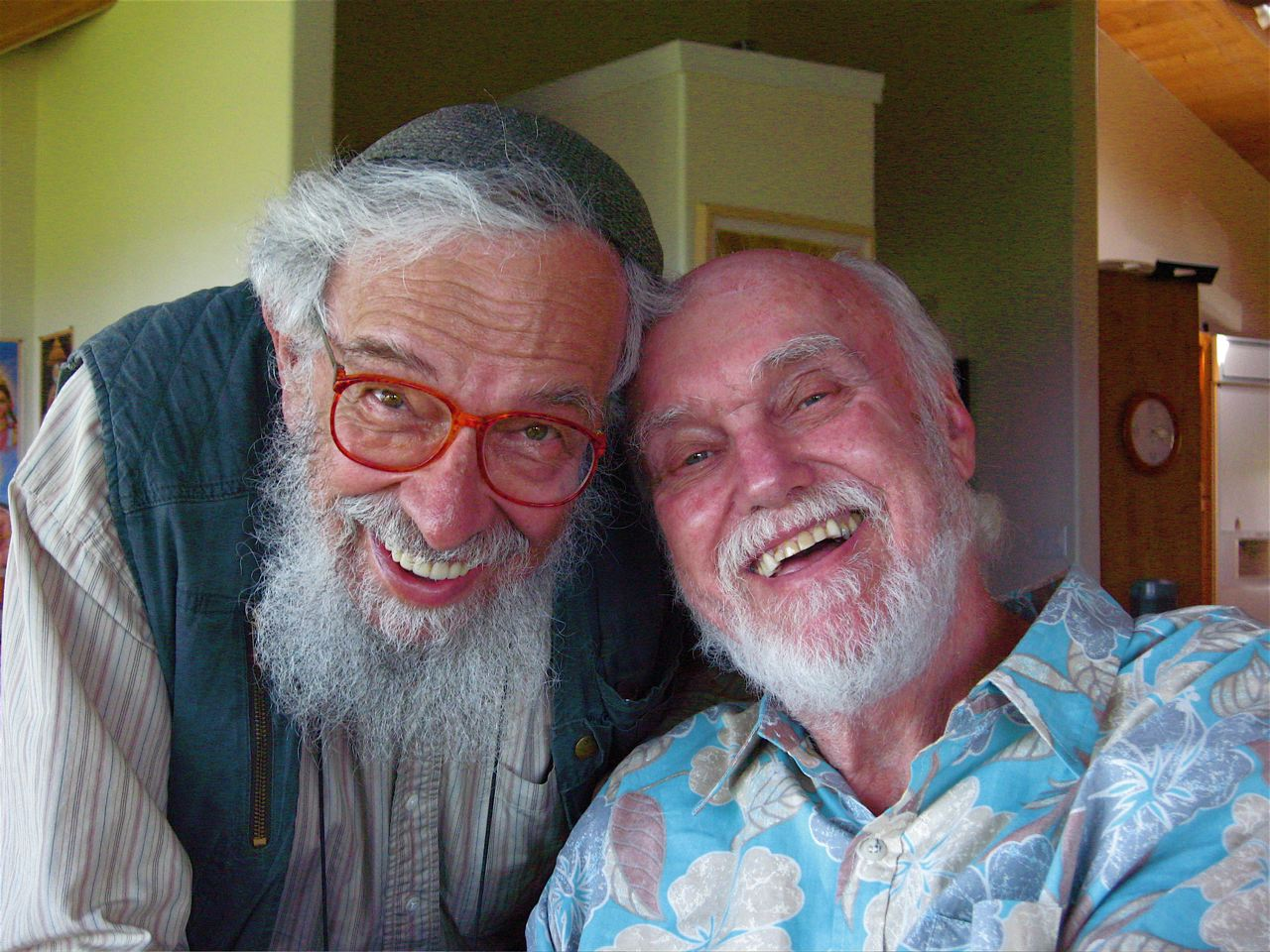
Ram Dass (right, pictured with Zalman Schachter-Shalomi), whose autobiographical story "The Transformation" inspired Harrison's song

Harrison drew inspiration for the song's lyrics from "The Transformation: Dr. Richard Alpert, PhD. into Baba Ram Dass". A humorous story, "The Transformation" was the first of four sections in Ram Dass's book Be Here Now, a popular introductory text to Hindu spirituality. As Richard Alpert, Dass had been a Harvard academic and an associate of Timothy Leary during the early 1960s, before embracing Hinduism – like Harrison in 1966, via experimentation with hallucinogenic drugs – and changing his name. Before the book's publication in 1971, according to musicologist Ian MacDonald, the phrase "Be here now" had become a "hippie maxim", reflecting a fundamental contention of Hindu philosophy regarding the all-importance of the present moment. For Harrison, the present meant his identity outside the public's perception of him as a Beatle, a role he had already tired of in 1965–66, during the height of the band's fame.

Author Ian Inglis writes of the parallels between "Be Here Now" and one of Harrison's 1968 compositions for the Beatles, "Long, Long, Long", due to the two songs' "common subject matter: time". In "Be Here Now", Harrison delivers his message in simple terms, stating that "The past was", whereas "Now is". According to theologian Dale Allison, the song also addresses the Hindu concept of maya, whereby the physical world is an illusion and the only truth is to realise the divine nature of one's soul. Harrison warns against what Allison terms "mistak[ing] the material world, which is only a grand illusion, for the real world", particularly in the lyrics to the middle eight:

Why try to live a life
That isn't real
No how?
A mind that wants to wander
'Round a corner
Is an unwise mind.

Harrison's musical biographer, Simon Leng, views "Be Here Now" as the singer questioning the validity of his role as a world-famous musician. Leng writes of Harrison yearning to escape "a Fab Four prehistory that so obsessed the media and his fans", and draws parallels between the former Beatle's predicament and a comedy sketch by Monty Python, featuring the character Arthur "Two Sheds" Jackson. In the sketch, Jackson is a composer of modern symphonies, yet the interviewer fixates on the trivial detail of how he acquired his unusual nickname.

In his book discussing the religious themes in Harrison's songwriting, Allison qualifies the literal message of "Be Here Now" by stating, "this song must be understood as an endorsement [of Dass's book]", yet it is "hardly the typical George". Allison cites many compositions from throughout Harrison's career, all covering issues of karma and reincarnation, as evidence that Harrison "encourages all of us to ponder our inescapable end and so imagine the future", rather than focusing only on the here and now. (Note: Allison's list begins with "Within You Without You", released on the Beatles' Sgt. Pepper's Lonely Hearts Club Band in 1967, and includes the songs "All Things Must Pass", "Living in the Material World", "The Answer's at the End" and "Heading for the Light", among others.) Harrison returned to the specific theme of "Be Here Now" in later songs such as "Flying Hour" and "Just for Today", the last of which adopts the here-and-now message as an inspirational statement for members of Alcoholics Anonymous.

== Recording ==
Harrison recorded "Be Here Now" for his second post-Beatles solo album, Living in the Material World, the sessions for which began in October 1972. With Phil McDonald serving as engineer, the recording took place at Apple Studio in London, according to the album credits. Bassist Klaus Voormann has stated that Harrison's Friar Park home studio in Oxfordshire was the true location, however, a contention supported by Jim Keltner, the drummer at the sessions. Harrison self-produced Material World and deliberately pared down the sound, keen to avoid the big production employed by Phil Spector on All Things Must Pass, his acclaimed 1970 triple album. Author Robert Rodriguez writes that, as a producer, Harrison "gave the tunes breathing space, allowing the instruments to sparkle", which included "a nearly imperceptible undercurrent of sitar" on "Be Here Now". Inglis views the recording as "musically evoking the mystery and profundity of time", as a complement to the song's lyrics.

I love that song … I remember we were playing it and I said, "I'd love to play the upright bass on that." And it was difficult to record, so I went into the bathroom at Friar Park and the microphone was put in there. What happened was that Mal Evans came and flushed the toilet while I was playing the bass! I did a drawing of that, and it was still there at Friar Park in that bathroom the last time I was there.

— Musician and artist Klaus Voormann, 2003, recalling the recording of "Be Here Now"

Besides Harrison, the musicians on the song were Gary Wright (on organ), Nicky Hopkins (piano) and the rhythm section of Voormann and Keltner – all of whom served as the core band on Material World. Behind Harrison's acoustic guitar and the sitar drone, the sparse instrumentation provides what author Elliot Huntley terms "a lesson in understatement". In the search for a good sound, Voormann recorded his part, on standup bass, in one of the bathrooms at Friar Park; he remembers being interrupted during a take by longtime Beatles aide Mal Evans flushing the toilet. (Note: An alternate take, released unofficially on bootlegs such as Living in the Alternate World, contains more-prominent contributions from Keltner and Hopkins, with Wright playing harmonium, and a rough guide vocal from Harrison.)

In his book The Beatles Forever, Nicholas Schaffner describes Harrison's use of Indian instrumentation on "Be Here Now" and "Living in the Material World" as marking "a return to the quasi-Indian mode" of his work with the Beatles during 1966–68, following which, Harrison admitted, he had rarely played the sitar. (Note: From 1966 to 1968, Harrison received sitar tuition from Shankar, the latter's protégé Shambhu Das and others. In addition to his playing on Material World, Harrison gave a rare demonstration on the instrument when he and Shankar appeared on The David Frost Show in November 1971, while promoting the film Raga.) Although Schaffner credits the part as a tambura, other commentators describe the instrument as a sitar.

Among the other tracks recorded for the album, "The Light That Has Lighted the World" and "Who Can See It" similarly reflect Harrison's desire to escape his Beatles past. In March 1973, following the completion of Material World, Harrison recorded "I'm the Greatest" in Los Angeles with his former bandmates Ringo Starr and John Lennon, for inclusion on Starr's first rock solo album, Ringo. The session immediately led to rumours of a possible Beatles reunion, partly encouraged by the three musicians having severed ties with manager Allen Klein. (Note: Klein's appointment as business manager in 1969 had traditionally been an obstacle in their relationship with Paul McCartney.)

== Release and reception ==
Apple Records released Living in the Material World on 30 May 1973, with "Be Here Now" sequenced as the second track on side two of the LP. It followed what Rodriguez describes as the "funky, up-tempo" "The Lord Loves the One (That Loves the Lord)" and was the first of four consecutive ballads that otherwise filled the LP's second side. As with all the new compositions on the album, Harrison donated his publishing royalties for the song to the Material World Charitable Foundation, a charitable trust he set up to avoid the tax problems that had hindered his aid effort for the Bangladeshi refugees. The album was a commercial success, continuing the run Harrison had enjoyed as a solo artist with All Things Must Pass and The Concert for Bangladesh.

Among contemporary reviews of Material World, some music critics objected to the abundance of ballads and to the increasingly religious focus of Harrison's songwriting. Never a fan of Harrison's solo work, Robert Christgau later commented on the album: "Harrison sings as if he's doing sitar impressions, and four different people, including a little man in my head who I never noticed before, have expressed intense gratitude when I turned the damned thing off during 'Be Here Now'." By contrast, Stephen Holden of Rolling Stone admired Material World as "a pop religious ceremony for all seasons" and described the song as "a meltingly lovely meditation-prayer, the ultimate aural refinement of 'Blue Jay Way'". (Note: Harrison wrote "Blue Jay Way" in August 1967 while staying in a house in the Hollywood Hills West area of Los Angeles. The song documents Harrison's struggle with the effects of jet lag as he waited for friends to find their way to the house through heavy fog.) In his review for Melody Maker, Michael Watts wrote of "Be Here Now"'s middle eight providing a "Confucius-like 'truth'" and commented that reading the album's lyric sheet was "rather like finding yourself at the feet of some Tibetan [lama]".

== Retrospective appraisal and legacy ==
=== Cultural influence and 2006 reissue ===
The phrase "Be Here Now" was used by the English band Oasis for the title of their third album, issued in 1997. Further to the group naming their hit song "Wonderwall" after Harrison's 1968 solo album, as well as their appropriation of various musical influences from his work, Harrison was not flattered by the apparent compliment, and was outspoken in his criticism of the band following the release of Be Here Now. (Note: Speaking to music journalist Mat Snow in 2014, Voormann said: "I did not know Oasis used the same title [as Harrison's song 'Be Here Now']. George hated them: 'Fucking Oasis – can't stand them!'") Harrison provided songs, including "Be Here Now", and other music for the 2001 documentary film Ram Dass: Fierce Grace.

Living in the Material World was reissued in remastered form in 2006, five years after Harrison's death from cancer at the age of 58. Among reviews at that time, Music Box editor John Metzger wrote that the "meditative fragility" of "Be Here Now" contributes to "the Zen-like beauty that emanates from Harrison's hymns to a higher power" on the album, while two years before, in The Rolling Stone Album Guide, Mac Randall described the tune as "rank[ing] among Harrison's prettiest". In his 2006 album review, for Mojo, Mat Snow considered it a "wonderful song" that "blends two of George's Beatle peaks, 'Blue Jay Way' and 'Long, Long, Long', to movingly transcendental effect". Less impressed, PopMatters' Zeth Lundy bemoaned the stripped-down sound of Living in the Material World after the "thunderous extravagance" of All Things Must Pass, such that "Be Here Now" was rendered "a little too slow-moving and dramatically anaemic".

Writing for The Huffington Post in 2011, Steve Rabey cited Harrison's drawing of inspiration from Dass's book, as from the Tao Te Ching and Autobiography of a Yogi in other songs, as an example of his standing as both a "cafeteria Hindu" and "perhaps the most explicitly and consistently theological rock star of the last half-century". Rabey concludes: "While he failed to convert everyone to his beliefs, he nudged his [former] bandmates – and his listener fans – a bit further to the East, encouraging audiences to open themselves to new (or very old) spiritual influences."

=== Biographers' assessments ===
Among Beatles and Harrison biographers, Chip Madinger and Mark Easter admire the "hypnotic, droning effect" on "Be Here Now", which they describe as "a lovely track"; Elliot Huntley views the arrangement as a "masterpiece"; and Alan Clayson praises the production and Harrison's "decorative fingering and harmonics" on guitar, which he rates "on a par with the acoustic virtuosity of John Renbourn". In The Rough Guide to the Beatles, Chris Ingham cites "the graceful 'Be Here Now'" as an example of how Harrison's "melodious gifts and distinctive ear for a harmony are in evidence throughout [Material World]".

Ian Inglis admires the song as "one of Harrison's most haunting and mysterious compositions", and writes of the recording: "The gentle, largely acoustic backing, and Harrison's achingly beautiful vocal give the song a nebulous, yearning quality, almost as if something barely understood is slipping out of sight." Inglis likens "Be Here Now" to the performance monologue "Time" by English actress and author Joyce Grenfell, whose conclusion that "there is no such thing as time – only this very minute, and I am in it" he finds echoed in Harrison's "sense of wonder and helplessness in the face of the spiritual, scientific, and metaphysical implications of time".

=== 2014 appraisal ===
The song continues to receive attention following the 2014 Apple Years Harrison reissues. In Mojo, Tom Doyle writes of Living in the Material World "spot[lighting] the spirituality and the dreaminess" in Harrison's songwriting, through "the gentle, non-preachy 'The Light That Has Lighted the World' and 'Be Here Now', both great works of look-around-you wonder". In a review for Blogcritics, Chaz Lipp views the production on the album as "meticulous" and superior to All Things Must Pass, such that "[t]he delicate melodies of songs like 'The Day the World Gets 'Round' and 'Be Here Now' are never lost in bombast." Writing for PopMatters, Scot Elingburg pairs "Be Here Now" with "Don't Let Me Wait Too Long" as Material World tracks that "offer much more than just Harrison's Hindu-inspired teachings; they also offer up the chance for larger dialogue within music."

Nick DeRiso, co-founder of the music website Something Else!, includes "Be Here Now" among the highlights of Harrison's solo career on Apple Records, and describes the track as "[a]n enveloping moment of wonder".

In his review for Classic Rock magazine, Paul Trynka writes:

The towering achievement of this album is, you might say, the preachiest song, "Be Here Now". A straightforward evocation of Buddhist philosophy, its modal folk riffs and wavering melody are enchanting. Writer Ian MacDonald suggested that Nick Drake's "River Man" was based on this same Buddhist notion of mindfulness, and there's a similar combination of dreaminess and fierce intensity in this song, which is a masterpiece.

== Cover versions ==
The 5th Dimension covered "Be Here Now" as part of the opening medley on their 1975 album Earthbound, produced and arranged by Jimmy Webb. Singer Robyn Hitchcock recorded the track, along with covers of songs by Johnny Cash, Bob Dylan, David Bowie and others, for a download-only album released in December 2010. Described by the website Slicing Up Eyeballs as a "pristine acoustic take", Hitchcock's version of "Be Here Now" appeared as the opening track on the collection. In 2024, Beck released a cover of the song, it was described as "atmospheric" by NME.

Coinciding with the release of The Apple Years, "Be Here Now" was one of 27 Harrison songs played at George Fest, an all-star concert organised by his son Dhani and held at the Fonda Theatre, Los Angeles, on 28 September 2014. The song was performed by Cult vocalist Ian Astbury. In a review of the concert, for No Depression magazine, C.J. Gronner described Astbury's performance as "my favorite part of the night".

== Personnel ==
According to Simon Leng:

- George Harrison – lead vocals, acoustic guitar, sitar, backing vocals
- Nicky Hopkins – piano
- Gary Wright – organ
- Klaus Voormann – standup bass
- Jim Keltner – drums

== Sources ==
- Dale C. Allison Jr, The Love There That's Sleeping: The Art and Spirituality of George Harrison, Continuum (New York, NY, 2006; ISBN 978-0-8264-1917-0).
- Keith Badman, The Beatles Diary Volume 2: After the Break-Up 1970–2001, Omnibus Press (London, 2001; ISBN 0-7119-8307-0).
- The Beatles, The Beatles Anthology, Chronicle Books (San Francisco, CA, 2000; ISBN 0-8118-2684-8).
- Andy Bennett & Jon Stratton (eds), Britpop and the English Music Tradition (rev. edn), Ashgate Publishing (Farnham, UK, 2013; ISBN 978-1-4094-9407-2).
- Nathan Brackett & Christian Hoard (eds), The New Rolling Stone Album Guide (4th edn), Fireside/Simon & Schuster (New York, NY, 2004; ISBN 0-7432-0169-8).
- Harry Castleman & Walter J. Podrazik, All Together Now: The First Complete Beatles Discography 1961–1975, Ballantine Books (New York, NY, 1976; ISBN 0-345-25680-8).
- Alan Clayson, George Harrison, Sanctuary (London, 2003; ISBN 1-86074-489-3).
- Jim DeRogatis, Milk It!: Collected Musings on the Alternative Music Explosion of the 90's, Da Capo Press (Cambridge, MA, 2003; ISBN 0-306-81271-1).
- Peter Doggett, You Never Give Me Your Money: The Beatles After the Breakup, It Books (New York, NY, 2011; ISBN 978-0-06-177418-8).
- The Editors of Rolling Stone, Harrison, Rolling Stone Press/Simon & Schuster (New York, NY, 2002; ISBN 0-7432-3581-9).
- Joshua M. Greene, Here Comes the Sun: The Spiritual and Musical Journey of George Harrison, John Wiley & Sons (Hoboken, NJ, 2006; ISBN 978-0-470-12780-3).
- George Harrison, I Me Mine, Chronicle Books (San Francisco, CA, 2002 [1980]; ISBN 0-8118-3793-9).
- Bill Harry, The George Harrison Encyclopedia, Virgin Books (London, 2003; ISBN 978-0-7535-0822-0).
- Elliot J. Huntley, Mystical One: George Harrison – After the Break-up of the Beatles, Guernica Editions (Toronto, ON, 2006; ISBN 1-55071-197-0).
- Chris Ingham, The Rough Guide to the Beatles, Rough Guides/Penguin (London, 2006; 2nd edn; ISBN 978-1-84836-525-4).
- Ian Inglis, The Words and Music of George Harrison, Praeger (Santa Barbara, CA, 2010; ISBN 978-0-313-37532-3).
- Peter Lavezzoli, The Dawn of Indian Music in the West, Continuum (New York, NY, 2006; ISBN 0-8264-2819-3).
- Simon Leng, While My Guitar Gently Weeps: The Music of George Harrison, Hal Leonard (Milwaukee, WI, 2006; ISBN 1-4234-0609-5).
- Ian MacDonald, Revolution in the Head: The Beatles' Records and the Sixties, Pimlico (London, 1998; ISBN 0-7126-6697-4).
- Chip Madinger & Mark Easter, Eight Arms to Hold You: The Solo Beatles Compendium, 44.1 Productions (Chesterfield, MO, 2000; ISBN 0-615-11724-4).
- Robert Rodriguez, Fab Four FAQ 2.0: The Beatles' Solo Years, 1970–1980, Backbeat Books (Milwaukee, WI, 2010; ISBN 978-1-4165-9093-4).
- Nicholas Schaffner, The Beatles Forever, McGraw-Hill (New York, NY, 1978; ISBN 0-07-055087-5).
- Ravi Shankar, Raga Mala: The Autobiography of Ravi Shankar, Welcome Rain (New York, NY, 1999; ISBN 1-56649-104-5).
- Mat Snow, "George Harrison: Quiet Storm", Mojo, November 2014, pp. 66–73.
- Bruce Spizer, The Beatles Solo on Apple Records, 498 Productions (New Orleans, LA, 2005; ISBN 0-9662649-5-9).
- Gary Tillery, Working Class Mystic: A Spiritual Biography of George Harrison, Quest Books (Wheaton, IL, 2011; ISBN 978-0-8356-0900-5).
- Bob Woffinden, The Beatles Apart, Proteus (London, 1981; ISBN 0-906071-89-5).
