= Give Me Love (Give Me Peace on Earth) =

- French picture sleeve

Single by George Harrison

from the album Living in the Material World
- B-side: "Miss O'Dell"
- Released: 7 May 1973 (US); 25 May 1973 (UK)
- Recorded: 9 October 1972
- Genre: Folk rock; gospel
- Length: 3:36
- Label: Apple
- Songwriter: George Harrison
- Producer: George Harrison

George Harrison singles chronology
"Bangla Desh" (1971)	"Give Me Love (Give Me Peace on Earth)" (1973)	"Dark Horse" (1974)

"Give Me Love (Give Me Peace on Earth)" is a song by English musician George Harrison, released as the opening track of his 1973 album Living in the Material World. It was also issued as the album's lead single, in May that year, and became Harrison's second US number 1, after "My Sweet Lord". In doing so, the song pushed Paul McCartney and Wings' "My Love" from the top of the Billboard Hot 100, marking the only occasion that two former Beatles have held the top two chart positions in America. The single also reached the top ten in Britain, Canada, Australia, and The Netherlands.

"Give Me Love (Give Me Peace on Earth)" is one of Harrison's most popular songs, among fans and music critics, and features a series of much-praised slide-guitar solos from Harrison. The recording signalled a deliberate departure from his earlier post-Beatles work, in the scaling down of the big sound associated with All Things Must Pass and his other co-productions with Phil Spector over 1970–71. Aside from Harrison, the musicians on the track are Nicky Hopkins, Jim Keltner, Klaus Voormann and Gary Wright. In his lyrics, Harrison sings of his desire to be free of karma and the constant cycle of rebirth; he later described the song as "a prayer and personal statement between me, the Lord, and whoever likes it".

Harrison performed "Give Me Love" at every concert during his rare tours as a solo artist, and a live version was included on his 1992 album Live in Japan. The original studio recording appears on the compilation albums The Best of George Harrison (1976) and Let It Roll: Songs by George Harrison (2009). At the Concert for George tribute to Harrison, in November 2002, Jeff Lynne performed "Give Me Love" with Andy Fairweather-Low and Marc Mann playing the twin slide-guitar parts. Marisa Monte, Dave Davies, Elliott Smith, Ron Sexsmith, Sting, James Taylor, Elton John, and Grace Vanderwaal are among the other artists who have covered the song.

== Background and inspiration ==
I want to be God-conscious. That's really my only ambition, and everything else in life is incidental.

— George Harrison, speaking in early 1971 about his plans following the success of All Things Must Pass

As with most of the songs on his Living in the Material World album, George Harrison wrote "Give Me Love (Give Me Peace on Earth)" over 1971–72. During this period, he dedicated himself to assisting refugees of the Bangladesh Liberation War, by staging two all-star benefit concerts in New York and preparing a live album and concert film for release. In addition, much of his time was spent occupied with the business and legal problems afflicting the humanitarian aid project. Author Andrew Grant Jackson writes that Harrison's frustration with this last issue resulted in a sombre quality pervading much of Material World, yet he "pushed his disillusionment aside for the lead single ['Give Me Love']".

The same period coincided with the height of Harrison's devotion to Hindu spirituality. As with his religious-themed 1970–71 hit, "My Sweet Lord", and his subsequent singles "What Is Life" and "Bangla Desh", Harrison wrote "Give Me Love" very quickly. Author Alan Clayson describes it as having "flowed from George with an ease as devoid of ante-start agonies as a Yoko Ono 'think piece'". In his autobiography, I, Me, Mine, Harrison recalls of the writing process:

Sometimes you open your mouth and you don't know what you are going to say, and whatever comes out is the starting point. If that happens and you are lucky, it can usually be turned into a song. This song is a prayer and personal statement between me, the Lord, and whoever likes it.

== Composition ==
"Give Me Love (Give Me Peace on Earth)" continues the precedent that Harrison set on "My Sweet Lord", through its fusion of the Hindu bhajan (or devotional song) with Western gospel tradition. Author Simon Leng comments that the song repeats another of its composer's hit formulas, by using a three-syllable lyrical hook as its title, like "My Sweet Lord", "What Is Life" and "Bangla Desh".

The song's time signature is primarily 4/4, with a meter change to 2/4 at the end of the intro, and to either 3/4 or 7/4 at the end of each pre-chorus (depending on the interpretation of the scorer). The musical key is F major. As on Harrison's recording, this can be accomplished by placing of a capo on the guitar's third fret, to transpose the chords from D up to the correct key. The intro features strummed acoustic guitar, similar in style to the opening of Bob Dylan's "Mr. Tambourine Man". The song builds gradually from its understated introduction, with the rhythm section only fully arriving after the first bridge segment. Harrison biographer Gary Tillery describes the musical mood as "bouncy yet soothing".

In his lyrics, Harrison expresses his vision for life in the physical world. Following the opening instrumental passage, the song begins with a chorus in which he first pleads for a life devoid of the karmic burden of reincarnation (rebirth): "Give me love, give me love, give me peace on earth / Give me light, give me life, keep me free from birth." These lyrics bear a simple, universal message, one that, in the context of the time, related as much to the communal "peace and love" idealism of the 1960s as it did Harrison's personal spiritual quest. (Note: Harrison biographer Elliot Huntley views the words to "Give Me Love" as a "lyrically dumbed-down version" of the singer's Hindu-aligned spiritual message. The theme regarding deliverance from rebirth in the physical world features more overtly in other tracks on Living in the Material World, particularly "The Lord Loves the One (That Loves the Lord)" and "Living in the Material World".)

Harrison also asks for divine assistance to "cope with this heavy load", while his stated attempt to "touch and reach you with heart and soul" recalls the same plea for a direct relationship with his deity that he expresses in "My Sweet Lord". These two lines, which complete the chorus, imply a deficiency or unfulfilment on the singer's part. According to author Ian Inglis, they serve as "an acknowledgment of the trials and tribulations he was facing in a more earthly setting" in the aftermath to the Concert for Bangladesh. (Note: Leng has cited Harrison's failing marriage to Pattie Boyd in 1972, as well as the possibility of Harrison having experienced a spiritual "crisis" in reaction to both the acclaim he had received as a solo artist since the Beatles' break-up, and the problems that had befallen his Bangladesh relief effort.)

During the two bridge sections, Harrison incorporates the sacred term "Om" within his extended phrase "Oh ... my Lord". Author Joshua Greene describes this as an example of a theme found in several songs on Material World, whereby Harrison "distilled" spiritual concepts into phrases "so elegant they resembled Vedic sutras: short codes that contain volumes of meaning". The use of the word "Om" was a further comment from Harrison on the universality of faith, after his switching in "My Sweet Lord" from "hallelujah" refrains to the Hare Krishna mantra. Referring to the second half of the bridges in "Give Me Love", Inglis views the drawn-out "Please …" as "highly symbolic", given the "unresolved conflict" that appears to be at the heart of the composition. (Note: As with "Om", the word "Please" is rendered in capital letters on the printed lyrics.)

== Recording ==
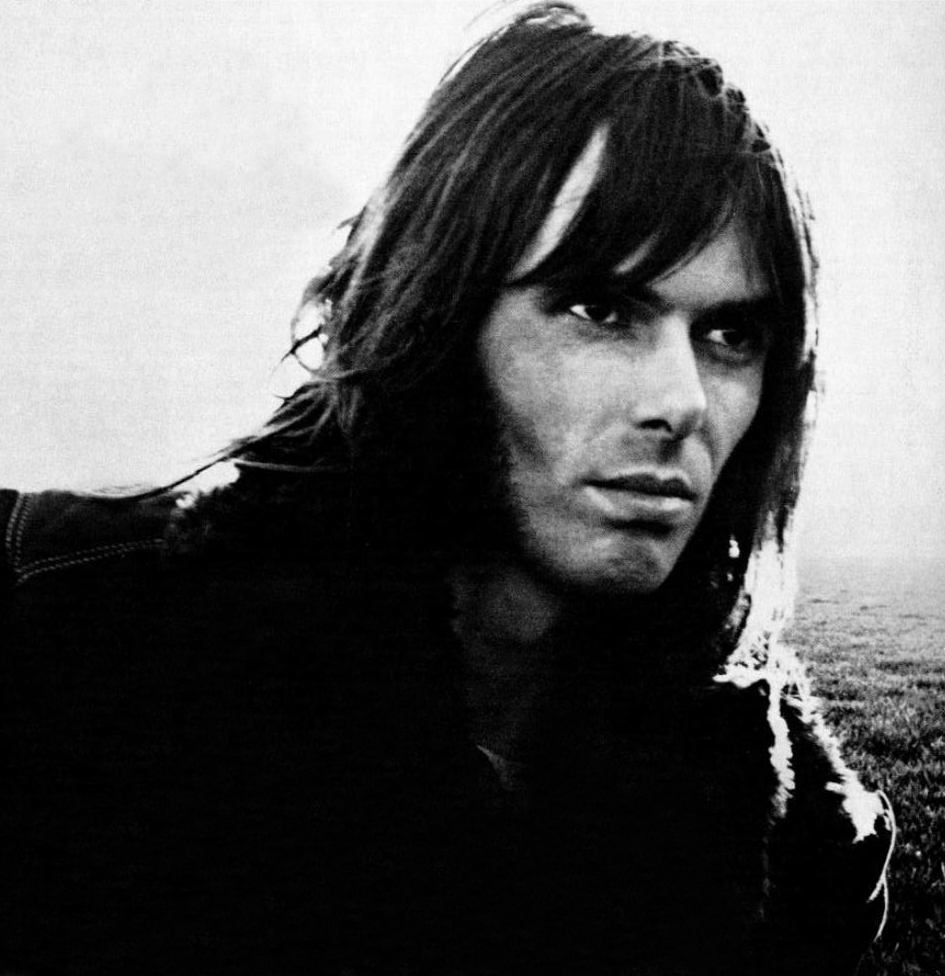
Pianist Nicky Hopkins, whose playing features prominently on the song, along with Harrison's slide guitar

Harrison's commitment to overseeing the release of the Concert for Bangladesh documentary film prevented him from being able to start on the follow-up to his All Things Must Pass triple album until midway through 1972. Another delay was caused by producer Phil Spector's unreliability, as Harrison waited for him to turn up for the start of the sessions. Author Bruce Spizer writes that "the eccentric producer's erratic attendance caused George to realize the project would never get done if he kept waiting for Spector", and by October that year, Harrison had decided to produce the album alone.

["Give Me Love"] perfectly encapsulates Harrison's guitar technique and production: economical in notes, it demonstrates virtuosity instead in its augmentation of the melody, rendered in the layering of two or more fluid slide guitar parts painstakingly arranged and impeccably recorded.

— Michael Frontani, writing in The Cambridge Companion to the Beatles

As for the majority of Living in the Material World, Harrison recorded the basic track for "Give Me Love" in the autumn of 1972 with the assistance of former Beatles engineer Phil McDonald. The recording location was either FPSHOT, Harrison's new home studio at Friar Park in Henley-on-Thames, or Apple Studio in London. In a departure from Harrison's co-productions with Spector, where a large line-up of musicians had been standard, "Give Me Love" featured a pared-down arrangement and more subtle instrumentation. Another contrast was Harrison's adoption of a production style that partly recalls George Martin's work with the Beatles. On "Give Me Love", Inglis notes the same "supple and clear [acoustic] guitar-playing that distinguished 'Here Comes the Sun'" in 1969, while the less grand production, relative to All Things Must Pass, allowed greater expression for Harrison as a slide guitarist.

Harrison carried out overdubs on the backing track, including twin slide-guitar parts, during the first two months of 1973. (Note: According to Beatles Diary compiler Keith Badman, an alternative version of "Give Me Love" exists, which Harrison gave to BBC Radio 1 DJ Alan Freeman for promotional purposes.) Aside from Harrison's guitar work, the most prominent instrument on the recording is Nicky Hopkins' piano, double-tracked and played in his usual melodic style. The rhythm section consisted of bassist Klaus Voormann and drummer Jim Keltner. The organ player on the song was American musician Gary Wright, whose 1971 album Footprint was one of many musical projects in which Harrison was involved between All Things Must Pass and Material World. (Note: Harrison also contributed to Hopkins' solo album The Tin Man Was a Dreamer, recording for which took place at Apple Studio in between sessions for Living in the Material World.) Peter Lavezzoli, author of The Dawn of Indian Music in the West, comments on how quickly Harrison's "unique approach" to slide-guitar playing had matured since 1970, to incorporate sitar, veena and other Hindustani musical stylings, and rates the mid-song solo on "Give Me Love" as "one of his most intricate and melodic".

== Release ==
"Give Me Love (Give Me Peace on Earth)" was Harrison's first single in close to two years, after "Bangla Desh" in July 1971. As with Living in the Material World, however, its release was delayed to allow for other items on Apple Records' release schedule during the first half of 1973: the Beatles' compilations 1962–1966 and 1967–1970, and Paul McCartney and Wings' second album, Red Rose Speedway. In the years since All Things Must Pass, according to author Robert Rodriguez, the public bickering between John Lennon and McCartney and their "subpar" music had done much to diminish the "cachet of being an ex-Beatle". In his 1977 book The Beatles Forever, Nicholas Schaffner wrote that, because of the altruism inherent in the Bangladesh project compared to the twin "fiascos" of McCartney's Wild Life album and the Lennon–Ono collaboration Some Time in New York City, "[a] receptive audience was guaranteed" for Harrison's new songs.

Backed by "Miss O'Dell", "Give Me Love" was issued on 7 May 1973 in America (as Apple R 5988) and 25 May in Britain (Apple 1862). Three weeks later, the song appeared as the opening track on Living in the Material World. As with all the songs on the album bar the 1971-copyright "Sue Me, Sue You Blues" and "Try Some, Buy Some", Harrison assigned his publishing royalties for "Give Me Love" to his newly launched Material World Charitable Foundation.

Apple's US distributor, Capitol Records, mastered the single to run at a faster speed than the album track, in order to make the song sound brighter on the radio. (Note: Although the A-side's running time read 3:32 on the single, "Give Me Love" actually ran to about 3:25.) Unusually for an Apple release by a former Beatle, the single was packaged in a plain sleeve in the main markets of Britain and the United States. A variety of picture sleeves were available in European countries, including a design incorporating Harrison's signature and a red Om symbol, both of which were aspects of Tom Wilkes's artwork for the Material World album.

=== US chart feat ===
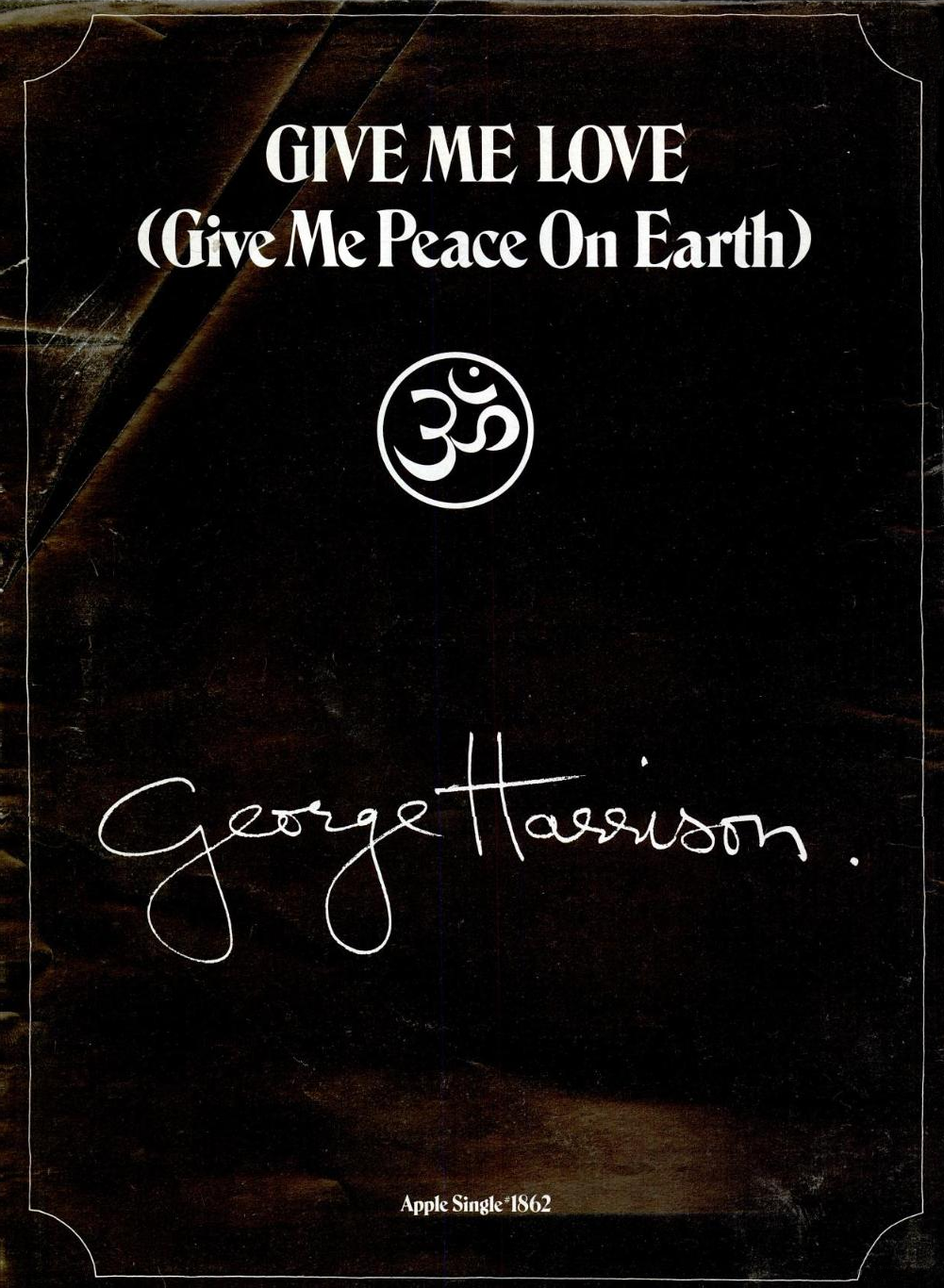
Trade ad for the single, May 1973

The single topped the Billboard Hot 100 at the end of June, for one week, and peaked at number 8 on the UK Singles Chart. Repeating the feat of January 1971, when "My Sweet Lord" and All Things Must Pass sat atop the Billboard charts simultaneously, "Give Me Love" hit number 1 part-way through Material World's five-week stay at the top of the albums listings. (Note: "Give Me Love" also topped the US charts compiled by Cash Box and Record World. In the UK, Melody Maker's chart recorded the single at number 7.)

"Give Me Love (Give Me Peace on Earth)" replaced Wings' "My Love" at number 1 on the Hot 100 singles chart, and in turn was replaced by "Will It Go Round in Circles", by Harrison's former Apple Records protégé Billy Preston. For the week ending 30 June that year, the Harrison, McCartney and Preston songs were ranked numbers 1, 2 and 3, respectively, on the Billboard Hot 100, marking the first time since 25 April 1964 that the Beatles occupied the top two positions on that chart. Schaffner described this period as "reminiscent of the golden age of Beatlemania", due to the amount of Beatles-related product dominating the charts in America. (Note: Thanks to Preston's appearances in the Beatles' 1970 documentary Let It Be and the Concert for Bangladesh film, he would long remain associated with the band. This was particularly so in mid 1973 when press reports tied him to a possible Beatles reunion, following the Los Angeles sessions for Ringo Starr's Ringo album.) As of October 2013, the week of 30 June 1973 remained the only time that two former members of the Beatles held the first and second positions on a US singles chart.

=== Reissue ===
"Give Me Love" later appeared on the 1976 compilation The Best of George Harrison, as one of just six selections from the artist's solo career. The song was also included on 2009's Let It Roll: Songs by George Harrison.

In Martin Scorsese's 2011 documentary George Harrison: Living in the Material World, released ten years after Harrison's death, the song plays over footage of the Friar Park grounds and of Harrison making music in the house with Keltner and Voormann. During the segment, Voormann discusses Harrison's practice of preparing the studio with incense to create a suitable environment, adding: "He really made it into a real tranquil, nice surrounding – everybody felt just great."

A stop motion animated music video directed by Finn Wolfhard was released on 17 December 2025.

== Reception ==
=== Contemporary reviews ===
"Give Me Love (Give Me Peace on Earth)" became one of Harrison's most popular songs, both from his years with the Beatles and from his subsequent solo career. On release, McCartney described it as "very nice", adding: "The guitar solo is ace and I like the time changes." Billboard magazine's reviewer wrote: "Harrison's voice and sweet, country tinged guitar work within a rippling but controlled rhythm base, lends itself to this plea for human understanding. His sincere sound engulfs the listener and brings [them] into the story." In Rolling Stone, Stephen Holden lauded the song for its "strong, short-phrased melody whose lyrics are sheer exhortation", and said that the single was "every bit as good as 'My Sweet Lord'". Record World called it "an outstanding message song that will please fans around the world."

In Britain, where the national economy was heading into recession after the boom years of the 1960s, lines such as "help me cope with this heavy load", according to Alan Clayson, "touched a raw nerve or two". (Note: Harrison's idealism was generally welcomed in the United States during this time. According to former Record Collector editor Peter Doggett, however, Lennon and McCartney's respective activities over 1971–72, particularly their public support for the republican cause in Northern Ireland, ensured that many music critics in the UK responded with hostility towards the former Beatles.) In the NME, Tony Tyler derided Harrison for "lay[ing] the entire Krishna-the-Goat trip on us", while Michael Watts of Melody Maker suggested that "Living in the Material World" might have been a better choice for the album's lead single. Writing in their 1975 book The Beatles: An Illustrated Record, Tyler and Roy Carr said that "Give Me Love" bore "more than a distant resemblance" to Dylan's "I Want You", but praised the track for its "excellent and highly idiosyncratic slide-guitar playing".

=== Retrospective reviews and legacy ===
Reviewing the song for AllMusic, Lindsay Planer highlights Harrison's guitar contribution to this "serene rocker" and likewise acknowledges Hopkins' "warm and soulful keyboard runs and fills". Zeth Lundy of PopMatters describes "Give Me Love" as "effervescent" and "a #1 single that remains one of Harrison's most iconic and well-loved". In his liner notes to the Let It Roll compilation, music historian Warren Zanes views "Give Me Love" as "perhaps the best example" of how Harrison's "post-Beatles songwriting blurs the line between music and prayer without ever sacrificing the pure melodic force for which he was known". (Note: Writing in the 2004 Rolling Stone Album Guide, Mac Randall described the tune as one of "Harrison's prettiest".)

Mojo contributor John Harris cites "Give Me Love" as evidence of Material World's standing as "something of a Hindu concept album … a pleasing fusion of Eastern religion, gospel, and the ghost of 'For You Blue'". Hugh Fielder of Classic Rock admires Harrison's "painstaking craftsmanship" and "sublime playing" on this and other Material World tracks and describes it as "one of Harrison's finest songs". Writing for Uncut, David Cavanagh considers the album to be a "utopian follow-up" to All Things Must Pass, on which "Give Me Love" "encapsulates the deal: simple message of hope, with gorgeous slide guitar … and fantastic rhythm section".

George had such a beautiful touch on the slide [guitar] ... When I hear certain songs that he played slide on, it just takes me right to a place ...

— Drummer Jim Keltner, in the "Give Me Love" segment of Martin Scorsese's documentary George Harrison: Living in the Material World

Among Harrison and Beatles biographers, Robert Rodriguez recognises Harrison's achievement in "cloak[ing] philosophical concerns in a thoroughly commercial package", which included his "impossibly compelling slide work". Simon Leng finds more superlatives for the song's guitar lines, describing them as "almost too euphonious to be true". Leng continues: "Living in the Material World could hardly have reveled in a stronger opening song ... A gorgeous ballad, awash with marvelously expressive guitar statements, 'Give Me Love' retains the emotional power of All Things Must Pass in a compelling three minutes."

Writing in Still the Greatest: The Essential Solo Beatles Songs, Andrew Grant Jackson considers that with "Give Me Love", Harrison "captured the essence of what he had set out to do with the [Bangladesh] concerts – and what the Beatles had tried to do in their more idealistic moments". Describing it as Harrison's "finest plea to God", with a vocal that "perfectly suits the yearning" implicit in the lyrics, Jackson adds: "'Give Me Love (Give Me Peace on Earth)' stands alongside 'All You Need Is Love,' 'Let It Be,' and 'Imagine' as the purest expression of the Aquarian Age dream." In his Harrison obituary for The Guardian in December 2001, former Melody Maker critic Chris Welch concluded with a reference to the track, saying that the ex-Beatle's "feelings and needs were best expressed in one of his simplest songs – 'Give Me Love (Give Me Peace on Earth)'".

In the Concert for George documentary film (2003), Eric Clapton names "Give Me Love" as one of his favourite Harrison compositions, along with "Isn't It a Pity". AOL Radio listeners voted the track fifth in a 2010 poll to find Harrison's best post-Beatles songs, while Michael Gallucci of Ultimate Classic Rock placed it fourth on a similar list that he compiled. Guitar World editor Damian Fanelli includes the track among his choice of Harrison's ten best post-Beatles "Guitar Moments", praising the mid-song solo as "simply one of the most intricate and melodic things the former Beatle ever played on slide". David Fricke includes "Give Me Love" in his list of "25 essential Harrison performances" for Rolling Stone magazine, and describes it as "a soft, intimate hymn, a small-combo reaction to the Wagnerian spectacle of All Things Must Pass".

== Performance ==
Harrison performed "Give Me Love (Give Me Peace on Earth)" throughout both his 1974 North American tour with Ravi Shankar and his 1991 Japanese tour with Eric Clapton, and during his 1992 benefit show for the Natural Law Party. The latter took place at London's Royal Albert Hall on 6 April that year and was Harrison's only full concert as a solo artist in Britain.

At his press conference in Los Angeles before the 1974 tour, Harrison said he would be playing "Give Me Love" with a "slightly different" arrangement, adding that, as with "My Sweet Lord", "It should be much more loose." The song usually appeared midway through the shows and featured Billy Preston's synthesizer and a flute solo from Tom Scott instead of the familiar slide-guitar breaks. Although widely bootlegged, no version of the song from this tour has been released officially.

=== Live in Japan version ===
The Japanese tour in December 1991 was Harrison's only other tour as a solo artist. His 1992 album Live in Japan contains a version of "Give Me Love" from this tour, recorded at Tokyo Dome on 15 December 1991. Harrison again delegated the solos to a fellow musician: in this case Andy Fairweather-Low reproduced the slide-guitar parts from the original studio recording. Ian Inglis notes the "impressive interplay", particularly towards the end of the song, between Harrison and his backup singers, Tessa Niles and Katie Kissoon.

This live version of "Give Me Love", along with the accompanying concert footage, was subsequently included in the Living in the Material World reissue in September 2006, as part of a deluxe CD/DVD package. The performance also appears on the DVD included in the eight-disc Apple Years 1968–75 box set, released in September 2014.

== Cover versions ==
Lindsay Planer writes that two covers of the song "worth noting" are a version by Bob Koenig, issued on his Prose & Icons album in 1996, and one by Brazilian singer Marisa Monte from the same year. Monte's version appeared on her album Barulhinho Bom, later released in English-speaking countries as A Great Noise. In 1998, "Give Me Love (Give Me Peace on Earth)" was one of five Harrison songs that composers Steve Wood and Daniel May adapted for their soundtrack to the documentary film Everest; part of the piece "The Journey Begins" incorporates "Give Me Love". (Note: Harrison had agreed to the adaptations by Wood and May on the understanding that no advance publicity would mention his connection.)

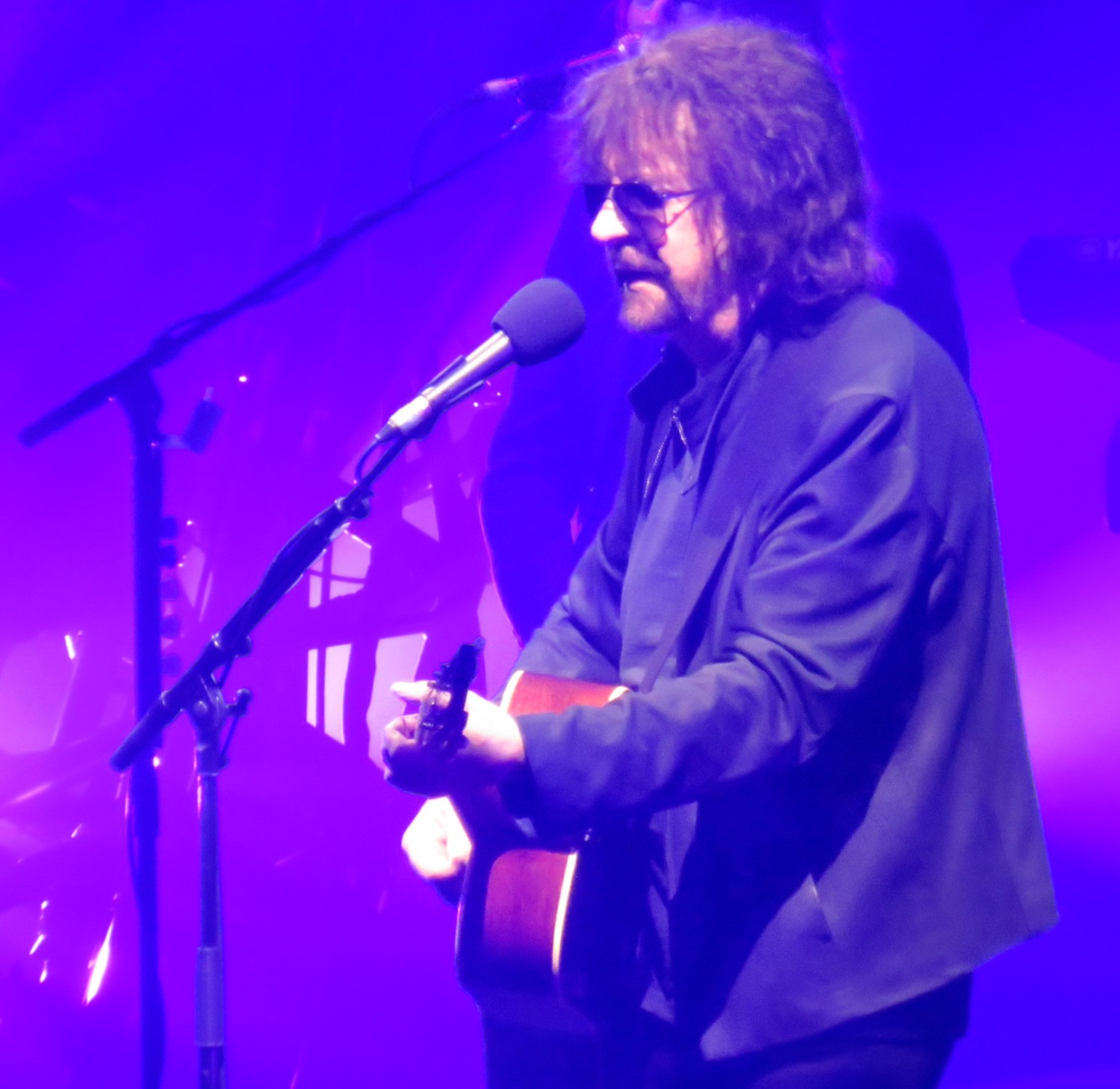
Jeff Lynne (pictured in 2016) performed the song at the Concert for George tribute in November 2002, a year after Harrison's death.

Artists other than Harrison who have performed the song live include Elliott Smith and, in April 2002, Sting, James Taylor and Elton John. These three musicians played "Give Me Love" as part of a tribute to Harrison during the Rock for the Rainforest benefit concert at Carnegie Hall in New York City. In what Planer describes as a "stirring reading", Jeff Lynne performed the song at the Concert for George on 29 November 2002, held at the Royal Albert Hall exactly a year after Harrison's death. Lynne was supported by a band comprising Harrison's friends and musical associates, including Eric Clapton, Andy Fairweather-Low, Marc Mann, Jim Keltner, Dhani Harrison, Niles and Kissoon.

Dave Davies of the Kinks contributed a version of "Give Me Love" to the multi-artist compilation Songs from the Material World: A Tribute to George Harrison in 2003. In a statement released in advance of the compilation, Davies explained that he was normally reluctant to perform other artists' songs yet had made "an exception" with "Give Me Love", in order to honour Harrison "as a great musical talent but primarily as an advanced soul who was unafraid to share his spiritual vision and journey with us". Davies subsequently issued the recording on his 2006 album Kinked.

In 2010, Broadway actress Sherie Rene Scott featured "Give Me Love" in her autobiographical musical Everyday Rapture as the show's final number. Canadian singer Ron Sexsmith has included the song in his live performances; a version by him appeared on Harrison Covered, a tribute CD accompanying the November 2011 issue of Mojo magazine. In December 2016, singer, songwriter and record producer Jem did her own version of "Give Me Love" for her album titled A Tribute to George Harrison. In January 2017, the Avett Brothers performed "Give Me Love (Give Me Peace on Earth)" live on The Late Show with Stephen Colbert.

In 2020 Disney+ released the movie Stargirl. During the closing credits Grace Vanderwaal sings her version of "Give Me Love". It also appears in the soundtrack.

== Personnel ==
According to Simon Leng:

- George Harrison – lead vocals, acoustic guitar, slide guitar, backing vocals
- Nicky Hopkins – piano
- Gary Wright – harmonium
- Klaus Voormann – bass guitar
- Jim Keltner – drums

== Charts ==
=== Weekly charts ===
Chart (1973)	Peak position
Australian Go-Set National Top 40	9
Belgian Singles Chart	27
Canadian RPM 100 Top Singles	9
Canadian RPM Adult Contemporary	2
Dutch MegaChart Singles	7
Irish Singles Chart	10
Japanese Oricon Singles Chart	37
New Zealand Listener Chart	9
Norwegian VG-lista Singles	7
UK Melody Maker Pop 30 Singles	7
UK Singles Chart	8
US Billboard Easy Listening	4
US Billboard Hot 100	1
US Cash Box Top 100	1
US Record World Singles Chart	1
West German Media Control Chart	28

=== Year-end charts ===
Chart (1973)	Rank
Canadian RPM Top Singles	110
US Billboard Year-End	42
US Cash Box Top 100	60

== Sources ==
- Dale C. Allison Jr., The Love There That's Sleeping: The Art and Spirituality of George Harrison, Continuum (New York, NY, 2006; ISBN 978-0-8264-1917-0).
- Keith Badman, The Beatles Diary Volume 2: After the Break-Up 1970–2001, Omnibus Press (London, 2001; ISBN 0-7119-8307-0).
- Nathan Brackett & Christian Hoard (eds), The New Rolling Stone Album Guide (4th edn), Fireside/Simon & Schuster (New York, NY, 2004; ISBN 0-7432-0169-8).
- Roy Carr & Tony Tyler, The Beatles: An Illustrated Record, Trewin Copplestone Publishing (London, 1978; ISBN 0-450-04170-0).
- Harry Castleman & Walter J. Podrazik, All Together Now: The First Complete Beatles Discography 1961–1975, Ballantine Books (New York, NY, 1976; ISBN 0-345-25680-8).
- Alan Clayson, George Harrison, Sanctuary (London, 2003; ISBN 1-86074-489-3).
- Peter Doggett, "George Harrison: The Apple Years", Record Collector, April 2001, pp. 34–40.
- The Editors of Rolling Stone, Harrison, Rolling Stone Press/Simon & Schuster (New York, NY, 2002; ISBN 0-7432-3581-9).
- Michael Frontani, "The Solo Years", in Kenneth Womack (ed.), The Cambridge Companion to the Beatles, Cambridge University Press (Cambridge, UK, 2009; ISBN 978-1-139-82806-2), pp. 153–82.
- George Harrison: Living in the Material World DVD (Village Roadshow, 2011; directed by Martin Scorsese; produced by Olivia Harrison, Nigel Sinclair & Martin Scorsese).
- Joshua M. Greene, Here Comes the Sun: The Spiritual and Musical Journey of George Harrison, John Wiley & Sons (Hoboken, NJ, 2006; ISBN 978-0-470-12780-3).
- George Harrison, I Me Mine, Chronicle Books (San Francisco, CA, 2002; ISBN 0-8118-3793-9).
- Elliot J. Huntley, Mystical One: George Harrison – After the Break-up of the Beatles, Guernica Editions (Toronto, ON, 2006; ISBN 1-55071-197-0).
- Ian Inglis, The Words and Music of George Harrison, Praeger (Santa Barbara, CA, 2010; ISBN 978-0-313-37532-3).
- Andrew Grant Jackson, Still the Greatest: The Essential Solo Beatles Songs, Scarecrow Press (Lanham, MD, 2012; ISBN 978-0-8108-8222-5).
- Peter Lavezzoli, The Dawn of Indian Music in the West, Continuum (New York, NY, 2006; ISBN 0-8264-2819-3).
- Simon Leng, While My Guitar Gently Weeps: The Music of George Harrison, Hal Leonard (Milwaukee, WI, 2006; ISBN 1-4234-0609-5).
- Ian MacDonald, Revolution in the Head: The Beatles' Records and the Sixties, Pimlico (London, 1998; ISBN 0-7126-6697-4).
- Chip Madinger & Mark Easter, Eight Arms to Hold You: The Solo Beatles Compendium, 44.1 Productions (Chesterfield, MO, 2000; ISBN 0-615-11724-4).
- Chris O'Dell (with Katherine Ketcham), Miss O'Dell: My Hard Days and Long Nights with The Beatles, The Stones, Bob Dylan, Eric Clapton, and the Women They Loved, Touchstone (New York, NY, 2009; ISBN 978-1-4165-9093-4).
- Robert Rodriguez, Fab Four FAQ 2.0: The Beatles' Solo Years, 1970–1980, Backbeat Books (Milwaukee, WI, 2010; ISBN 978-1-4165-9093-4).
- Nicholas Schaffner, The Beatles Forever, McGraw-Hill (New York, NY, 1978; ISBN 0-07-055087-5).
- Mat Snow, The Beatles Solo: The Illustrated Chronicles of John, Paul, George, and Ringo After The Beatles (Volume 3: George), Race Point Publishing (New York, NY, 2013; ISBN 978-1-937994-26-6).
- Bruce Spizer, The Beatles Solo on Apple Records, 498 Productions (New Orleans, LA, 2005; ISBN 0-9662649-5-9).
- Gary Tillery, Working Class Mystic: A Spiritual Biography of George Harrison, Quest Books (Wheaton, IL, 2011; ISBN 978-0-8356-0900-5).
