= Living in the Material World (song) =

- Cover of the original Hansen Publishing sheet music for the song

Song by George Harrison

from the album Living in the Material World
- Published: Material World Charitable Foundation (administered by Harrisongs)
- Released: 30 May 1973
- Recorded: 5 October 1972
- Genre: Rock
- Length: 5:31
- Label: Apple
- Songwriter(s): George Harrison
- Producer(s): George Harrison

"Living in the Material World" is a song by English rock musician George Harrison that was released as the title track of his 1973 album. In the song's lyrics, Harrison contrasts the world of material concerns with his commitment to a spiritual path, and the conflict is further represented in the musical arrangement as the rock accompaniment alternates with sections of Indian sounds. Inspired by Gaudiya Vaishnava teacher A.C. Bhaktivedanta Swami Prabhupada, the song promotes the need to recognise the illusory nature of human existence and escape the constant cycle of reincarnation, and thereby attain moksha in the Hindu faith. The contrasts presented in "Living in the Material World" inspired the Last Supper-style photograph by Ken Marcus that appeared inside the album's gatefold cover, and also designer Tom Wilkes's incorporation of Krishna-related symbolism elsewhere in the packaging.

Harrison references his Beatles past as one of the trappings of the material world and refers by name to each of his three former bandmates. Ringo Starr, the Beatles' former drummer, plays drums on the track, which was recorded in England between October 1972 and February 1973. The rock portions include a slide guitar solo by Harrison, saxophone solos, two drummers, and prominent Hammond organ, while the meditative Indian interludes feature flute, tabla and a rare post-Beatle sitar contribution from Harrison. Jim Horn, Gary Wright and Zakir Hussain are among the other musicians on the recording.

The production and musicianship on the track has received favourable comments from several reviewers. On release, Stephen Holden of Rolling Stone described the song as "an incantatory, polyrhythmic rocker with a falsetto-on-sitar refrain". In addition to providing the title for the Living in the Material World album, it inspired Harrison's choice for a name for his charity, the Material World Charitable Foundation, to which he donated his publishing royalties from the composition. The 2006 reissue of the album includes a film clip of "Living in the Material World", featuring archival footage of the vinyl LP's manufacturing process. Film-maker Martin Scorsese used the song's title for that of his 2011 documentary on the life of George Harrison.

== Background ==
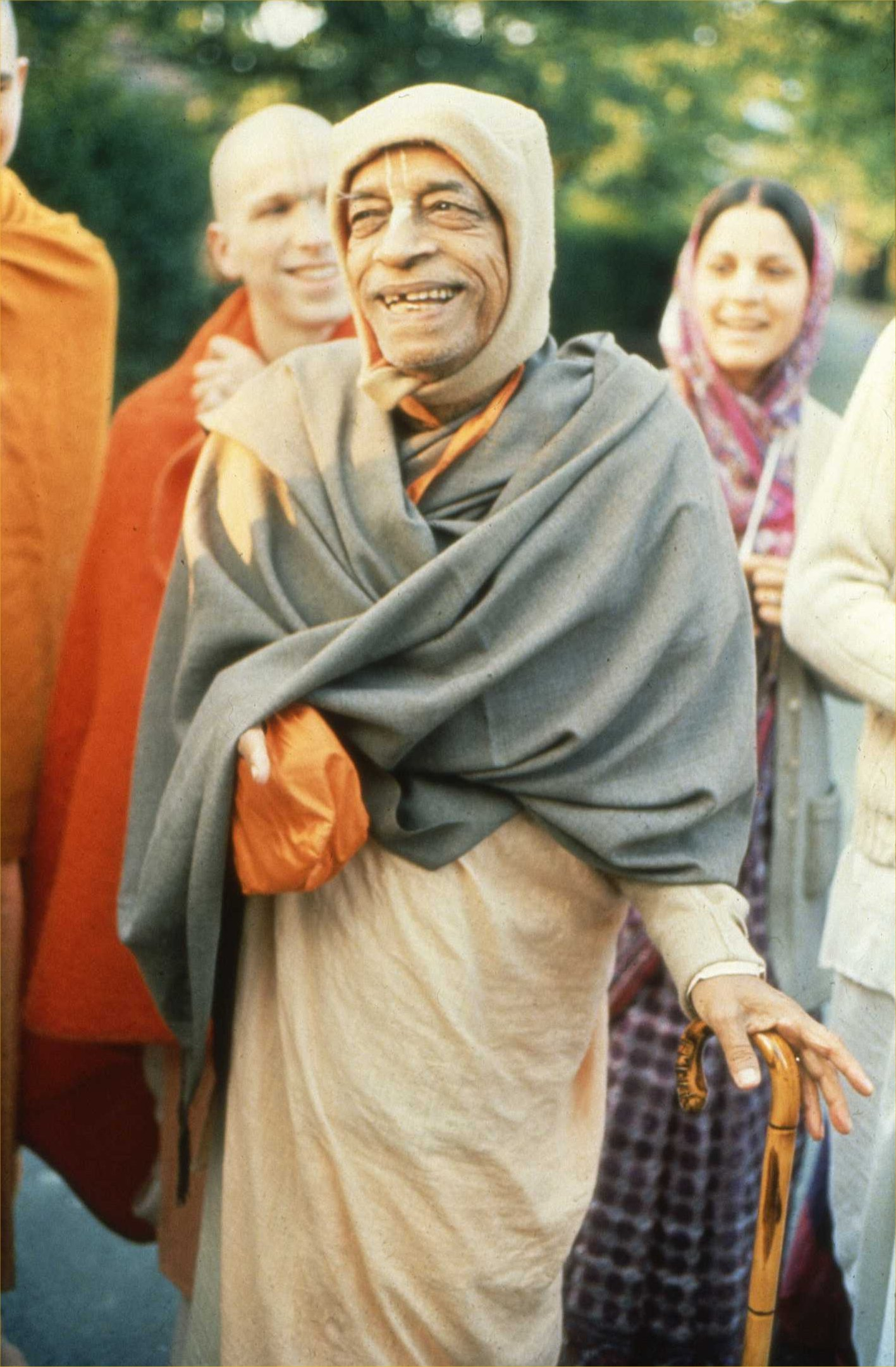
A.C. Bhaktivedanta Swami Prabhupada, whose Gaudiya Vaishnavan teachings influenced the song

In his 1980 autobiography, I, Me, Mine, George Harrison credits the influence for "Living in the Material World" to A.C. Bhaktivedanta Swami Prabhupada, the founder and leader of the International Society for Krishna Consciousness (ISKCON), commonly known as the Hare Krishna movement. Harrison adds that the song specifically espouses the message that "we are not these bodies, we are in these material bodies in the physical world." His friend Ravi Shankar once observed that Harrison exhibited tyagi, a trait meaning non-attachment or renunciation, a point to which Shankar added: "He had everything – all the wealth, the fame, whatever he wanted. But he was not attached to it ... because he was searching for something much higher, much deeper. It does seem like he already had some Indian background in him [from a previous life]." Harrison later said of life in the material world, referring to the need to break the cycle of rebirth associated with reincarnation: "The whole point to being here, really, is to figure a way to get out."

Author Gary Tillery draws parallels between Harrison's approach to "[going] through the motions of living in the material world" and the way someone in the 21st century might play a virtual reality game. Tillery writes that "what we see and experience during the game is actually an illusion" – or maya in the Hindu belief to which Harrison subscribed – and that "[w]hat does matter in the great scheme of things is to wake up from the dreamlike state we mistake for reality." Speaking at a 1974 press conference, in reply to whether there was a "paradox" between his spiritualism and the lifestyle of a musician, Harrison conceded: "It is difficult ... You can go to the Himalayas and miss it completely and [yet] be stuck in the middle of New York and be very spiritual ... I think one by one we all free ourselves from the chains that we have chained ourselves to, whatever we're chained to."

== Composition ==
As reproduced in I, Me, Mine, Harrison wrote the lyrics to "Living in the Material World" on portions of a torn-up envelope, which was previously addressed to Terry Doran at Apple Corps in central London, its postmark dated 7 November 1971. The song contrasts the world of material things against spiritual concerns. The verses describing the material world are set to rock music, over what author Simon Leng terms Harrison's "favourite 'Get Back' rhythm". The two sections describing the spiritual world serve as the song's middle eights and use a more gentle melody backed by Indian instrumentation. In Leng's view, these sections recall Harrison's 1967 composition "Within You Without You". While remarking on how Harrison's lyrics from his 1973 album Living in the Material World "resembled Vedic sutras", author Joshua Greene writes that in the song "Living in the Material World", he "condensed a lengthy passage from the Bhagavad Gita into a dozen simple words".

In the opening verse, Harrison states that he "Can't say what I'm doing here" in the material world, an admission that theologian Dale Allison identifies as Kafkaesque until Harrison offers "eschatological hope" with the subsequent line, "But I hope to see much clearer". Harrison then states that he uses his body "like a car / Taking me both near and far". Author Ian Inglis regards this as an apt metaphor, since human bodies "are merely the vehicles that carry us on our journeys".

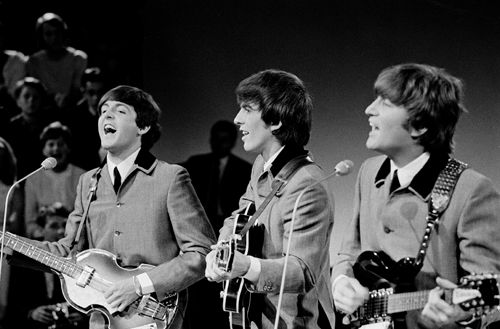
Harrison (centre) performing with the Beatles in 1964

Harrison refers to his years as a member of the Beatles. He names his former bandmates John Lennon, Paul McCartney and Ringo Starr in a verse that introduces a humorous aspect into the narrative: (Note: In I, Me, Mine, Harrison discusses the lyrics' spiritual qualities but adds: "It's also a comedy song with a few jokes in case you didn't notice!")

Met them all here in the material world
John and Paul here in the material world
Though we started out quite poor
We got Richie on a tour.

Inglis comments on Harrison's pun on the word "Richie", which can refer to the Beatles' financial success from 1963 onwards, in the sense of "riches", and to the improvements in musicianship brought about by the arrival of drummer Richard Starkey, also known as Ringo Starr, who replaced Pete Best in late 1962. While noting Harrison's "laconic humor" in the song, Leng describes him as "still caught in the yin-yang of his Beatles identity", further to the various "instalments of 'the Beatles soap opera'" that Harrison provided on his 1970 triple album All Things Must Pass.

This place's not really what's happening. We don't belong here [in the material world], but in the spiritual sky.

– Harrison to ISKCON devotee Mukunda Goswami, 1982

In the Indian-styled middle eight, Harrison sings about his "sweet memories" of "the spiritual sky" and prays not to "get lost or go astray". Allison writes that Harrison's "true home" is in the mediative spiritual sky, since however impressive his achievements with the Beatles might be to others, they brought him no "meaningful contentment".

After returning to the rock-music setting, Harrison sings of his frustrations in the material world, which rather than satisfying human desires, merely leaves the senses "swelling like a tide". Tillery writes of Harrison not being immune to "the siren call of the world" despite his spiritual goals; in his autobiography, Harrison refers to 1973–74 as "the naughty period", a reaction to the failure of his marriage to Pattie Boyd. (Note: Harrison acknowledged in a 1992 interview: "I am an extreme person ... I was always extremely up or extremely down, extremely spiritual or extremely drugged.")

In line with teachings that Harrison had absorbed from both Maharishi Mahesh Yogi in 1967 and the Bhagavad Gita, Allison suggests, the lines "Got a lot of work to do / Try to get a message through" demonstrate "a sort of prophetic self-conception" on the singer's part. In the final verse, Harrison expresses his desire for moksha, or release from the cycle of reincarnation, with the words: "I hope to get out of this place / By the Lord Sri Krsna's Grace."

Inglis writes that "Living in the Material World" contrasts not only the physical with the spiritual for Harrison, but also issues such as "past and present, West and East, noise and calm". Leng notes the irony in the fact that although Harrison's experience with the Beatles "cast him into the material world", his exposure to Eastern philosophy came through that same experience, and thus the Beatles were "both his nemesis and his saviors". While citing the Bhagavad Gita as a significant influence on "Living in the Material World", Allison views the "dualistic anthropology" expressed in the song as "central to [Harrison's] self-conception and worldview". Harrison himself attributed this dualism to his Pisces astrological sign, an issue he addresses in the posthumously released "Pisces Fish".

== Production ==
=== Initial recording ===
From mid 1971, Harrison had been largely sidetracked from his musical career for over a year, through his commitment to the humanitarian aid project that he and Shankar had initiated with the Concert for Bangladesh. As a result, Harrison only began recording his second post-Beatles solo album, the highly anticipated follow-up to All Things Must Pass, in October 1972. The Magic Is Here Again and The Light That Has Lighted the World were each rumoured to be the title of the new album until Apple Records announced it as Living in the Material World. Inglis views "Living in the Material World" as an ideal title track for the album, given "the internal dialogue in which he was engaging at the time". Leng describes Harrison as "a man positively pregnant with vision" following his achievements over the two years since the Beatles' break-up; like author Robert Rodriguez, Leng considers that a visit Harrison made to India with American musician Gary Wright, in early 1972, was a contributing factor in his artistic ambitions for the album. (Note: In I, Me, Mine, Harrison mentions a 1974 visit to India as having been his first there since 1968, however. In her 2011 book George Harrison: Living in the Material World, Olivia Harrison includes photos of Harrison and Wright in India, and similarly gives 1974 as the year, as does Wright in his 2014 autobiography, Dream Weaver.)

Harrison was keen to pare down the production after the Wall of Sound excesses employed by Phil Spector on All Things Must Pass, and chose to use a small group of backing musicians throughout the sessions. Aside from himself on electric guitar, the line-up on the basic track for "Living in the Material World" was Nicky Hopkins (piano), Wright (Hammond organ), Klaus Voormann (bass) and Starr and Jim Keltner (both on drums). Inglis describes the music as "a powerful rock backing", while Leng views "Living in the Material World" as "the one time in his career that Harrison deliberately set out to create a big, showpiece rock number".

The recording took place at the Beatles' Apple Studio, according to the album's sleeve credits, although Voormann maintains that Harrison's new home studio, FPSHOT, was the main location. Harrison had intended to co-produce with Spector as before, but he became the album's sole producer due to Spector's unreliability. Session tapes, since made available unofficially on the Living in the Alternate World bootleg, reveal that the rock instrumentation on "Living in the Material World" continued, at a reduced volume, over the "spiritual sky" portions originally.

With Phil McDonald as recording engineer, the basic tracks for most of the album were completed by December 1972, before Hopkins departed for Jamaica to work on the Rolling Stones' new album, Goats Head Soup. Harrison, McDonald and Indian classical musician Zakir Hussain then produced the recording of a recent New York performance by Shankar and Ali Akbar Khan, released on Apple Records in January 1973 as the double live album In Concert 1972.

=== Overdubbing ===
A raunchy Reeperbahn quality exploded from striking keyboard riffs, a wailing guitar, a heavy saxophone, and a driving percussion. Then he stopped the music and a gentle, tabla-filled interlude lifted the song to a meditative realm ... then bang! He brought listeners back into the material world ... See how easy it is, the abrupt return declared, to forget and again get caught up in maya, in illusion?

– Author Joshua Greene, commenting on the effect of Harrison's musical arrangement for the song

Work continued on Living in the Material World during January and February. Hussain and Jim Horn were among those who made contributions to the overdubs on the title track, and Horn also played on "The Lord Loves the One (That Loves the Lord)", another song directly inspired by Prabhupada. (Note: Author Peter Lavezzoli describes the overdubbing session as the first major recording for Hussain, who went on to join his father, Alla Rakha, as one of Indian classical music's foremost tabla players.) Over the two "spiritual sky" sections, Hussain added tabla, replacing the rock rhythm section, while Horn played flute and Harrison played sitar. (Note: Rather than sitar, Leng suggests that the Indian string instrument providing the drone is a tambura.) Author Alan Clayson likens Harrison's production style on Material World to that of Beatles producer George Martin and notes that "this moderation resulted in arrangements flexible enough for the title track to flit smoothly" between the contrasting rock and "celestial" Indian sections. The use of Indian instrumentation recalls Harrison's work with the Beatles during 1966–68, following which, Harrison admitted, he rarely played the sitar. Adding to the pun behind the "Richie" line in the verse referencing the Beatles, Starr provides a drum fill. Later in the track, Horn's flute similarly acknowledges the mention of Krishna – flute being synonymous with Krishna in the Hindu faith.

For the solos on "Living in the Material World", Harrison and Horn overdubbed slide guitar and tenor saxophone, respectively. Leng likens Harrison's soloing to the "passionate, rocking slide guitar" he supplied on "Edward" for Hopkins's The Tin Man Was a Dreamer album, also recorded at Apple in late 1972. The recording ends with what Clayson terms "a syncopated blues run-down", emphasising the song's "big production" status.

== Release and representation in album artwork ==
Apple Records released Living in the Material World on 30 May 1973. The title track was sequenced to end side one of the LP, and followed another Harrison composition reflecting on his years with the Beatles, "Who Can See It". In keeping with the album content, Tom Wilkes's design for the record's face labels contrasted a devout spiritual existence with life in the material world, by featuring a painting of Krishna and his warrior prince Arjuna on side one and a picture of a Mercedes stretch limousine on the reverse. The painting of Krishna and Arjuna came from a version of the Bhagavad Gita published by Prabhupada under the title Bhagavad-Gītā As It Is.

Inner gatefold image from the Material World album, showing Harrison and his fellow musicians at a Last Supper-style banquet; photo by Ken Marcus

Author Elliot Huntley views Living in the Material World as a concept album on which the material–spiritual "quandary" evident in the title track is "eloquently expressed" through the artwork's mix of religious symbolism and an inner-gatefold photograph that showed "[Harrison's] band indulging in a gratuitously sumptuous feast". The stretch-limousine image was a detail taken from this photo, the concept for which reflected Harrison's view that the material world is not only related to money and possessions, but to "everything which is gross, physical, or material as opposed to the subtle, astral or casual", as he puts it in I, Me, Mine when discussing the song. NME critic Bob Woffinden also commented on the symbolism of this picture showing "Harrison with his musicians (Nicky Hopkins, Klaus Voormann, Jim Keltner, Ringo – the usual lot) enjoying a hearty repast, passing the no-doubt vintage wine, while in the background the longest limousine in the world awaits their convenience". (Note: The same photograph appeared opposite the words to "Living in the Material World" at the start of the lyrics section of the Material World songbook, published by the Charles Hansen sheet music company.)

A parody of da Vinci's The Last Supper, the picture was taken by Hollywood glamour photographer Ken Marcus. Clayson has speculated on the symbolism and hidden messages within the photo: whether the nurse with a pram, set back from and to the left of the dining table, was a reference to Boyd's inability to conceive a child; and the empty, distant wheelchair in memory of Harrison's late mother. Allison finds evidence of Harrison's antipathy towards organised religion in this inner-gatefold photo, following on from the lyrics to his 1970 song "Awaiting on You All". (Note: Harrison is dressed as a Catholic priest, all in black, and sports an Old West six-shooter – an appearance that Allison interprets as "a slam at the perceived materialism and violence of the Roman church".) To add to Harrison's "mystique", author Bruce Spizer writes, Wilkes placed a colour image of him over the main, black-and-white print. The same detail echoed the contrast in "Living in the Material World" between the illusory nature of human existence and what Allison describes as the "vital, eternal reality" offered by spiritual enlightenment.

The song also provided the inspiration for the title of Harrison's charity, the Material World Charitable Foundation, launched in April 1973. Harrison donated the copyright to "Living in the Material World" and eight other tracks on the album to the foundation, one of the stated aims of which was "to encourage the exploration of alternative life views and philosophies".

== Critical reception ==
In his album review for Rolling Stone, Stephen Holden wrote of Harrison having "inherited the most precious Beatle legacy – the spiritual aura that the group accumulated" and suggested that he had "maintained its inviolability with remarkable grace". Holden described "Living in the Material World" as "an incantatory, polyrhythmic rocker with a falsetto-on-sitar refrain" and viewed the music as "some of the most complex on the album". Billboard magazine listed the song first among the "best cuts" on a collection whose themes included "the Beatles and their mish-mash" and a "spiritual undercoat". In Melody Maker, Michael Watts described "Living in the Material World" as "brilliant" and suggested that it might have made a superior lead single to "Give Me Love (Give Me Peace on Earth)". In his 1981 book The Beatles Apart, Bob Woffinden wrote admiringly of Harrison "grappling with the problem" of "striving for spiritual goals when you're a young and famous multi-millionaire". Woffinden dismissed the title track as a "flop", however, citing Harrison's failed attempts "to elide the syllables of 'material'" with the melody.

More recently, AllMusic critic Lindsay Planer has described "Living in the Material World" as "one of the more profound observations to be made about the somewhat schizophrenic struggle between universal existence and monetary-driven survival". Planer praises the recording as "a testament to the artist's ability to deliver the goods [as a guitarist], with searing albeit brief interaction with saxophonist Jim Horn" and similarly compliments the playing of Starr and Hopkins. While opining that Material World "suffers from a more anonymous tract" next to All Things Must Pass, Zeth Lundy of PopMatters pairs "Living in the Material World" with "The Lord Loves the One" as the album's "most uptempo rock songs", which "fare much better [than some of the ballads] as eager bids for secession from this life, or at least from the clutches of its material concerns".

Writing in 2014, Joe Marchese of The Second Disc highlights "Living in the Material World" among tracks that combine to form the album's "earnest and intensely personal, yet wholly accessible, statement". While describing Material World as "meticulously produced", Blogcritics writer Chaz Lipp considers the "galloping title track" to be a song that "rank[s] right alongside Harrison's best work". In another 2014 review, for the Lexington Herald-Leader, Walter Tunis includes the track among the "stunners" found on Material World, and labels it a "comparatively whimsical title tune".

Among Beatles and Harrison biographers, Chip Madinger and Mark Easter describe "Living in the Material World" as "superb" and Robert Rodriguez views Harrison's "deft blending of Western and Eastern sounds" as a "production marvel". Although he admires the "vaguely Indian middle eight[s]", Elliot Huntley bemoans the "complex, powerhouse arrangement" used elsewhere and finds Horn's sax playing "a little overbearing". Simon Leng calls "Living in the Material World" a "musical Roman Candle", and a "highly effective track" that is "the work of a very confident musician". Ian Inglis praises Harrison's "inventive" lyrics, of which the "got Richie on a tour" line is "one of his cleverest puns", and notes that the song's positioning in the running order "echoes George Martin's policy of always selecting a strong track to close each side of every Beatles album".

== Subsequent releases and legacy ==
The song was remastered in 2006 for EMI's reissue of Living in the Material World, five years after Harrison's death. The final selection on the DVD accompanying this reissue featured "Living in the Material World" set to archival footage of the manufacturing process behind the album. The footage had been commissioned by Harrison in 1973, and it includes an executive undertaking a test pressing, preparation of the face labels, vinyl cutting, and the album being hand-packaged in EMI's warehouse. During the first "spiritual sky" section, the film cuts to footage of Harrison raising a yellow and red Om flag on the roof of his Friar Park home – a demonstration he adopted in the early 1970s to reflect when he was living true to his spiritual goals. (Note: Conversely, he signified periods of transgression from this path by flying a skull-and-crossbones pirate flag. This scene showing Harrison on the Friar Park roof originally appeared in the promotional video for his 1974 Christmas–New Year single "Ding Dong, Ding Dong".) The clip ends with a colourised still of Marcus's inner gatefold photo. With production credited to Abbey Road Interactive, this film of "Living in the Material World" also appears on the DVD included in Harrison's 2014 The Apple Years 1968–75 box set.

The song provided the title for Martin Scorsese's 2011 documentary George Harrison: Living in the Material World and for Olivia Harrison's book accompanying the film. During her interview in the documentary, Olivia discusses her late husband's determination to "work out" all his karma in the one lifetime rather than have his soul return to earth in a new incarnation. Writing for The Huffington Post at the time of the film's release, Religion News Service reporter Steve Rabey referred to "Living in the Material World" as a song that "illuminates [Harrison's] theology and sense of artistic vocation", and he said of the former Beatle: "his greatest legacy may be the way his decades-long spiritual quest shaped the ways the West looks at God, gurus and life." On Harrison's official website, the Material World Charitable Foundation page continues to use "Living in the Material World" as its featured audio.

== Personnel ==
- George Harrison – lead vocals, electric guitar, slide guitar, sitar, backing vocals
- Nicky Hopkins – piano
- Gary Wright – Hammond organ
- Klaus Voormann – bass guitar
- Ringo Starr – drums, tambourine
- Jim Keltner – drums, maracas
- Zakir Hussain – tabla
- Jim Horn – tenor saxophone, flute

== Sources ==
- Dale C. Allison Jr., The Love There That's Sleeping: The Art and Spirituality of George Harrison, Continuum (New York, NY, 2006; ISBN 978-0-8264-1917-0).
- Keith Badman, The Beatles Diary Volume 2: After the Break-Up 1970–2001, Omnibus Press (London, 2001; ISBN 0-7119-8307-0).
- Harry Castleman & Walter J. Podrazik, All Together Now: The First Complete Beatles Discography 1961–1975, Ballantine Books (New York, NY, 1976; ISBN 0-345-25680-8).
- Chant and Be Happy: The Power of Mantra Meditation, Bhaktivedanta Book Trust (Los Angeles, CA, 1992; ISBN 978-0-89213-118-1).
- Alan Clayson, George Harrison, Sanctuary (London, 2003; ISBN 1-86074-489-3).
- Peter Doggett, You Never Give Me Your Money: The Beatles After the Breakup, It Books (New York, NY, 2011; ISBN 978-0-06-177418-8).
- The Editors of Rolling Stone, Harrison, Rolling Stone Press/Simon & Schuster (New York, NY, 2002; ISBN 0-7432-3581-9).
- Joshua M. Greene, Here Comes the Sun: The Spiritual and Musical Journey of George Harrison, John Wiley & Sons (Hoboken, NJ, 2006; ISBN 978-0-470-12780-3).
- George Harrison, I Me Mine, Chronicle Books (San Francisco, CA, 2002; ISBN 0-8118-3793-9).
- Olivia Harrison, George Harrison: Living in the Material World, Abrams (New York, NY, 2011; ISBN 978-1-4197-0220-4).
- Elliot J. Huntley, Mystical One: George Harrison – After the Break-up of the Beatles, Guernica Editions (Toronto, ON, 2006; ISBN 1-55071-197-0).
- Ian Inglis, The Words and Music of George Harrison, Praeger (Santa Barbara, CA, 2010; ISBN 978-0-313-37532-3).
- Peter Lavezzoli, The Dawn of Indian Music in the West, Continuum (New York, NY, 2006; ISBN 0-8264-2819-3).
- Simon Leng, While My Guitar Gently Weeps: The Music of George Harrison, Hal Leonard (Milwaukee, WI, 2006; ISBN 1-4234-0609-5).
- Chip Madinger & Mark Easter, Eight Arms to Hold You: The Solo Beatles Compendium, 44.1 Productions (Chesterfield, MO, 2000; ISBN 0-615-11724-4).
- Robert Rodriguez, Fab Four FAQ 2.0: The Beatles' Solo Years, 1970–1980, Backbeat Books (Milwaukee, WI, 2010; ISBN 978-1-4165-9093-4).
- Nicholas Schaffner, The Beatles Forever, McGraw-Hill (New York, NY, 1978; ISBN 0-07-055087-5).
- Bruce Spizer, The Beatles Solo on Apple Records, 498 Productions (New Orleans, LA, 2005; ISBN 0-9662649-5-9).
- Gary Tillery, Working Class Mystic: A Spiritual Biography of George Harrison, Quest Books (Wheaton, IL, 2011; ISBN 978-0-8356-0900-5).
- Bob Woffinden, The Beatles Apart, Proteus (London, 1981; ISBN 0-906071-89-5).
- Gary Wright, Dream Weaver: A Memoir; Music, Meditation, and My Friendship with George Harrison, Tarcher/Penguin (New York, NY, 2014; ISBN 978-0-399-16523-8).
- Bill Wyman, Rolling with the Stones, Dorling Kindersley (London, 2002; ISBN 0-7513-4646-2).
