= World of Stone =

- 1975 B-side face label

Song by George Harrison

from the album Extra Texture (Read All About It)
- A-side: "You"
- Released: 22 September 1975
- Recorded: 2 May – 27 June 1975
- Studio: A&M (Los Angeles)
- Genre: Rock, soul
- Length: 4:40
- Label: Apple
- Songwriter: George Harrison
- Producer: George Harrison

"World of Stone" is a song by English rock musician George Harrison, released in 1975 on Extra Texture (Read All About It), his final album for Apple Records. It was also issued as the B-side of the album's lead single, "You". Harrison wrote the song in 1973 but recorded it two years later, following the unfavourable critical reception afforded his 1974 North American tour with Ravi Shankar and the Dark Horse album. Due to its context on release, commentators view "World of Stone" as a plea from Harrison for tolerance from these detractors. According to some of his biographers, the lyrics reflect Harrison's doubts regarding his devotion to a spiritual path – an apparent crisis of faith that followed his often-unwelcome spiritual pronouncements during the tour, and which permeated his work throughout 1975.

Harrison recorded "World of Stone" in Los Angeles with backing from musicians such as David Foster, Gary Wright and Klaus Voormann. The downbeat mood of the recording and the piano-based arrangement typify the Extra Texture album while also demonstrating the influence of soul music on Harrison's career during this period. While some reviewers have described the track as a moving ballad, several of his biographers hold it in low regard. Author and theologian Dale Allison describes the song as an "expression of alienation from the world".

== Background ==
Much of the critical reaction to George Harrison's 1974 album Dark Horse was scathing and focused on his near-completed North American tour with Ravi Shankar, which took place in November and December that year. Harrison had planned these concerts during a pilgrimage to India in February 1974, midway through a period that was otherwise blighted by rock-star excess and the failure of his marriage to Pattie Boyd. According to author Gary Tillery, Harrison envisaged the tour as a development of his acclaimed 1971 Concert for Bangladesh shows, where Shankar's Indian music set and Harrison's spiritually themed rock songs had been warmly received. Tillery writes of Harrison's motivation at the time: "Why not carry the idea further and proselytize? One tour might open tens of thousands of minds to the wisdom found in Eastern mysticism."

I'm not up here jumping like a loony for my own sake, but to tell you that the Lord is in your hearts. Somebody's got to tell you.

– George Harrison to a concert audience during his "Dark Horse Tour", November 1974

Harrison's workload throughout 1974, particularly his dedication to setting up Dark Horse Records as the Beatles' Apple record label was being wound down, left him rushing to prepare for the tour by October while also completing Dark Horse. Another issue that compromised Harrison's enthusiasm for the concerts was the attention afforded them as the first US tour by a former Beatle, resulting in a clash between the artist's self-image and the expectations of many critics and concertgoers. Among the criticism levelled at him during the tour, Harrison's declarations of his Hindu-aligned religious beliefs came across as harangues rather than uplifting messages to his fans, and were symbolic of what NME critic Bob Woffinden later described as a "didactic, sermonising mood" on the singer's part. For the shows' encore, Harrison turned his biggest solo hit, "My Sweet Lord", into an "exhortation to chant God's name", author Alan Clayson writes, be it Krishna, Buddha, Christ or Allah. At times during Shankar's set, he chastised the audience for their lack of respect for Indian music and a God-conscious path. Early in the tour, Harrison also used religiosity to defend his decision to feature few Beatles-era songs in the setlist, telling Ben Fong-Torres of Rolling Stone magazine: "Gandhi says create and preserve the image of your choice. The image of my choice is not Beatle George ... My life belongs to the Lord Krishna ... I'm the servant of the servant of the servant of the servant of the servant of Krishna."

Simon Leng, Harrison's musical biographer, describes the period immediately following the tour as "open season on Harrison". Whereas Rolling Stone had declared in 1973 that Harrison had "inherited the most precious Beatle legacy – the spiritual aura that the group accumulated", now the magazine's album reviewer attacked him for his "insufferable" spiritual preoccupations. Writing in the NME, Woffinden similarly dismissed Dark Horse as "the product of a complete egotist ... someone whose universe is confined to himself. And his guru." Privately, Harrison descended into a "spiritual funk", Tillery writes. Another biographer, Joshua Greene, concludes of Harrison's post-tour mindset: "He grappled with the depressing realization that most people simply didn't care to hear about Krishna or maya or getting liberated from birth and death ... A man whose natural instinct was to share his life-transforming discoveries with others had been rejected ..."

== Composition ==
=== Music ===
Author Robert Rodriguez suggests that one of the reasons for Harrison's follow-up album, Extra Texture (Read All About It), being rushed into production in April 1975 was to "redeem the artist from negative fallout" created by Dark Horse over the winter of 1974–75. (Note: Another factor was that Harrison was in Los Angeles overseeing projects by acts signed to his Dark Horse label when studio time became available, through the postponement of sessions for Splinter's second album.) Having come up with little new material in the previous six months, Harrison revisited songs he had written or begun writing in 1973, one of which was titled "World of Stone". While discussing the song in September 1975, with BBC Radio 1 disc jockey Paul Gambaccini, Harrison commented: "There's not much of a story to it ... it's really just down to saying that everybody has their own opinion and right to be ... It's a nice melody."

The composition is a slow ballad set to 4/4 time. On the released recording, it is dominated by piano, which provides the main instrumentation over the first two verses, before what author Elliot Huntley describes as the song's "sped up second section", featuring a full band backing. Leng says that this structure partly mirrors that of Harrison's 1971 charity single "Bangla Desh": "a slow explanatory introduction followed by a stomping rocker – except that 'World of Stone' is more softshoe shuffle than stomp".

The chord pattern differs little throughout the song. On guitar, it consists of the chords (played with a capo at the fifth fret) of Bm^{7}–F♯m–Am^{7}–F–C–E^{7sus4}–E^{7}. A variation from this sequence occurs during the repeated last line of each second verse, with the addition of the chords D^{7}/F♯ and F^{maj7}.

=== Lyrics ===
In his 1980 autobiography, I, Me, Mine, Harrison explains the message of "World of Stone" as being "Don't follow me", as outlined in its opening verse:

Wise men you won't be
To follow the like of me
In this world made of stone
Such a long way to go.

Because of its context when he recorded the song, these lyrics serve as an abdication by Harrison of his role as an avatar for Eastern mysticism. Leng notes the precedent set in the late 1960s, when the Beatles were "recast" as "the bearers of fundamental spiritual truths", yet here Harrison was observing that "rock stars have no cure for the world's spiritual malaise". Author Ian Inglis interprets this verse as either a "rebuke" to listeners looking to the Beatles for philosophical answers, or a "frank confession" from Harrison that "his own quasi-religious search for enlightenment has brought him little contentment".

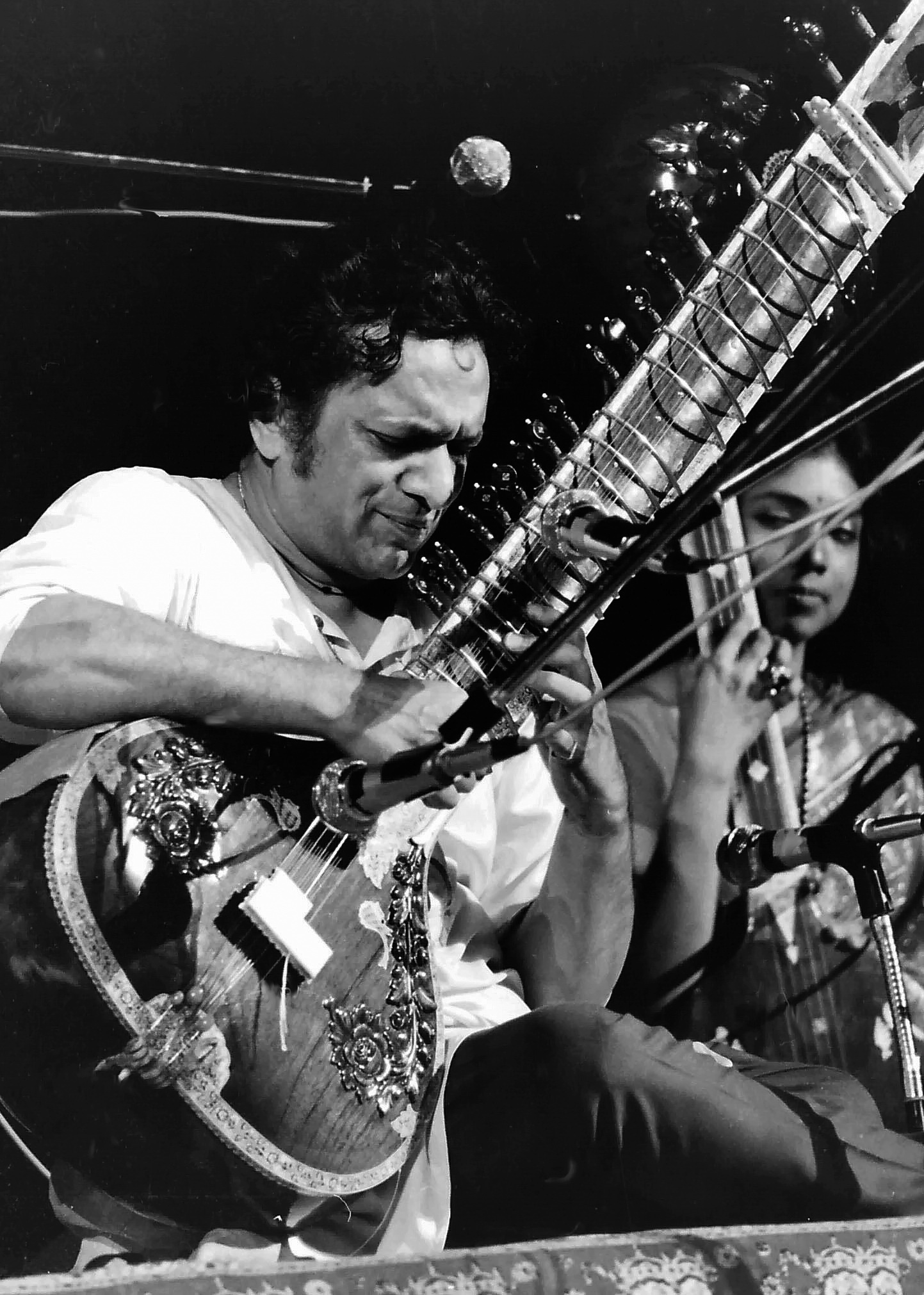
Ravi Shankar performing in 1969. In "World of Stone", Harrison's lyrics suggest a divergence from the spiritual path he had espoused throughout his and Shankar's 1974 tour.

In the second verse, the lines "You may disagree / We all have the right to be" represent Harrison's plea for tolerance from his critics, Leng writes, as on other Extra Texture songs such as "The Answer's at the End". Leng adds that the eponymous "world of stone" is "the material world under another guise".

Before the first of the song's two instrumental breaks, Harrison states that this world is "Such a long way from home" – home being "spiritual understanding", according to Inglis. This repeated line is viewed as significant by Tillery and by Christian theologian Dale Allison, on the basis of whether Harrison intended the final word to be "home" or the sacred Sanskrit term "Om". Tillery writes: "Where does he find himself? 'Such a long way from home' ... but in his autobiography, he renders it, 'Such a long way from OM' – confessing his inner turmoil at having strayed from his faith." (Note: In I, Me, Mine, the line appears as "Such a long way from OM" in Harrison's discussion of the composition. The page containing the typed song lyrics reads "Such a long way from home", yet Harrison's handwritten lyrics in the same publication give the final word as "OM" in the song's last verse.) Allison identifies Extra Texture as being unique among Harrison's post-Beatles solo albums due to its complete avoidance of "positive theological statements", mirroring the "emptiness" of Harrison's apparently faithless existence in 1975, and he interprets this particular lyric as the singer "expressing his remoteness from both God and his ideals". While noting that the ancient Hindu text Bhagavad Gita "identifies the sound 'OM' with Brahman and promises that chanting it with attention on one's deathbed will lead one to 'the highest goal'", Allison writes of its possible inclusion in the context of "World of Stone": "All pontifical pronouncements have ceased. George has come to doubt what matters to him most."

Allison says that in the lyrics to "World of Stone", Harrison "abandons his earlier religious content for ambiguity". Leng identifies this quality in two lines in the song's final verse: "The wiser you may be / The harder it can be to see". Leng presents three possible interpretations for this couplet: "another play on the blind seer idea"; Harrison's rejection of the concept espoused in his 1968 Beatles composition "The Inner Light", "that knowledge is the key to enlightenment"; or, like his 1975 rebuttal to detractors such as Rolling Stone, "This Guitar (Can't Keep from Crying)", a "dig at smartass rock journalists".

== Recording ==
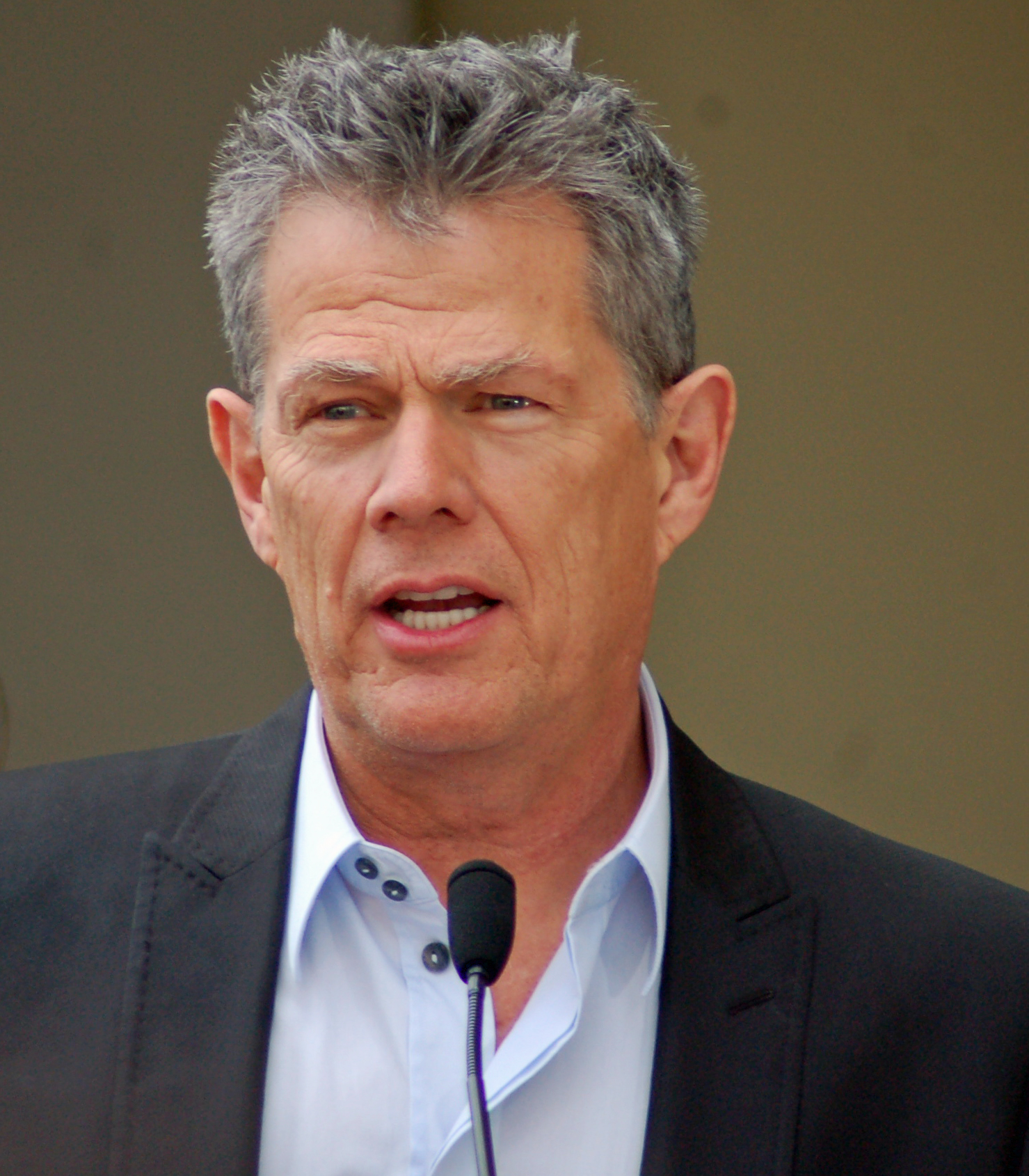
David Foster (pictured in 2010) contributed the piano part that dominates the track.

The sessions for Extra Texture took place at A&M Studios in Hollywood, starting in the third week of April 1975. Harrison taped the basic track for "World of Stone" on 2 May. Aside from Harrison on vocals and electric guitar, the musicians on the recording are David Foster (on piano and ARP Strings), Gary Wright (organ), Jesse Ed Davis (electric guitar), Klaus Voormann (bass) and Jim Keltner (drums). A friend of Harrison's since the Beatles' years in Hamburg, Voormann was dismayed at the prevalence of drugs at the sessions. Recognising that Harrison was "bottoming out from events of the past couple of years", according to Rodriguez, Voormann's participation on "World of Stone" marked a relatively rare appearance by the German bass player at the Extra Texture sessions. Foster, who had recently arrived in Los Angeles from Canada, says he was "overjoyed" to be invited to contribute to a Harrison album, but he was shocked at how the musicians would imbibe midway through rehearsing a song. (Note: Foster told Mojo magazine in 2014: "We would be playing with the piano facing the wall for soundproof reasons, so I couldn't see the other musicians. The bass would drop out, then the drums, then the guitar, so I thought maybe this is where I should play a solo. I was so young and naive I didn't realise they were leaving the room – to do whatever they were doing.")

"World of Stone" is typical of its parent album's keyboard-based sound. Leng identifies this sound as "tend[ing] toward moody, piano-driven soul-jazz" and says that Wright's "gospel flourishes" on Hammond organ add to the song's soul music qualities. (Note: Leng also describes Extra Texture as sounding like a "soul album for lovers", given the soft presence of Harrison's vocals in the mix. Rodriguez terms it "an LP-length excursion" into soul music.) The instrumental sections feature guitar solos by Harrison and a shouted, crowd-like backing chorus. Authors Chip Madinger and Mark Easter write that overdubbing on the basic track took place on 2 June and that the song was "revisited" on 27 June. Although the album's musicians credits provide no personnel for the chorus singing, Madinger and Easter list Harrison, Davis, Foster and Attitudes singer Paul Stallworth as having participated in the 2 June session. (Note: Los Angeles-based Attitudes was a band signed to Dark Horse Records, comprising Keltner, Foster, Stallworth and guitarist Danny Kortchmar. As well as possibly singing on "World of Stone", Stallworth contributed bass or backing vocals to three other songs on Extra Texture, including "The Answer's at the End".)

== Release ==
"World of Stone" was selected as the B-side of the album's lead single, "You", which Harrison had recorded in 1971 with producer Phil Spector and then completed during the sessions for Extra Texture. The release took place on 12 September 1975 in Britain and three days later in the United States. Author Bruce Spizer describes the pairing as an "up-beat love song" backed by a "philosophical ballad". Rodriguez comments on the "joyous" quality of the Motown-inspired A-side compared with the "slower or darker groove" of the album's more recent songs, of which "World of Stone" was "every bit as downbeat as the [title] suggested".

For the first time as a solo artist, Harrison undertook promotion for one of his albums, which included an interview with Melody Maker. In the interview, he voiced his continuing support for meditation and the Beatles' former teacher, Maharishi Mahesh Yogi, and he said that, while he might still be religious relative to most rock stars, "Compared to what I should be, I'm a heathen." Having shown a patronising attitude towards his former Beatles bandmates earlier in the year, according to author and journalist Peter Doggett, Paul McCartney spoke out in support of Harrison in an interview with the NME, saying: "He's so straight and so ordinary and so real. And he happens to believe in God. That's what's wrong with George, to most people's minds … [In truth] he's a grown-up teenager, and he refuses to give in to the grown-up world." (Note: By contrast, in the April 1975 issue of Playboy, McCartney had said of Harrison, John Lennon and Ringo Starr: "I really ought to talk to those boys, tell them the facts of life. I thought we were finished with all those immature things – religious kicks, drug kicks, chasing birds …")

Apple issued Extra Texture (Read All About It) on 22 September, with "World of Stone" sequenced as the last track on side one of the LP. While the album's lyrics contained only minimal religious or spiritual references, its artwork (which was based on sketches provided by Harrison) included a blue Om symbol displayed prominently on the vivid orange cover. The same design elements appeared on the face labels for both the single and the LP.

== Critical reception ==
Leng describes the critical reception to Extra Texture as "only slightly less vituperative than the one Dark Horse had received". In Rolling Stone, Dave Marsh dismissed most of the album's first side as "padded subterfuges" and concluded of the collection as a whole: "Finally, we are faced with the fact that Harrison's records are nothing so much as boring. They drone, and while chants and mantras may be paths to glory in other realms, in pop music they are only routes to tedium." Ray Coleman of Melody Maker admired the words to "World of Stone", which he said was "an insistently strong track" with "the sort of lyric and 'read between-the-lines' melody John Lennon would write".

Writing in 1981, Bob Woffinden commented in response to "World of Stone" and other songs that "again plead plaintively with critics not to judge too severely": "In this different context [a year on from Dark Horse], such pleas are more sympathetic. Very well, then, we will not." In a 2001 review for Record Collector, Peter Doggett said that Extra Texture merited reappraisal and that "In retrospect, side one of the album was most commendable, from the upbeat 'You' … to the portentous 'World of Stone'."

Among Harrison's biographers, Dale Allison describes the song as an "expression of alienation from the world" and comments: "The disparity between this confused melancholy and the confident religious advocacy on All Things Must Pass and Living in the Material World is remarkable." (Note: Allison writes that on the 1976 album Thirty Three & 1/3, Harrison's first on Dark Horse Records, "the old religion ... is back, and it never leaves." Among its tracks, Allison continues, "Dear One" marks Harrison's "religious renewal" after the doubts expressed in "World of Stone" and other songs from his 1975 album.) Gary Tillery groups the song with the Extra Texture tracks "Grey Cloudy Lies" and "Tired of Midnight Blue" as examples of Harrison having reached "rock bottom" in 1975. Elliot Huntley views "World of Stone" as overlong, with the shouted backing vocals "annoying" and Harrison's guitar sound "thin and weedy", and he bemoans that "the melody doesn't really deviate from its beginnings". Like Leng, Ian Inglis gives over much of his discussion of the song to possible interpretations of its lyrics, but he otherwise writes: "Harrison returns to his view of the world as a place of obstacles and trials in which there is little hope ... The variations in his vocal range fail to add variety or interest to what is, by now, a predictable and cheerless message, set to a leaden and monotonous score."

Reviewing the 2014 reissue of Harrison's Apple catalogue, Paul Trynka of Classic Rock considers that Extra Texture's "confessional songs" such as "World of Stone" have "worn well". Trynka writes that the track exemplifies its composer's "knack for taking a sweet melody in an unpredictable direction", and he adds: "Today, when pop stars swig Cristal and flash their pecs on Instagram, we can appreciate the irony of Harrison being attacked for preaching enlightenment."

== Personnel ==
- George Harrison – vocals, electric guitar, backing vocals
- David Foster – piano, ARP synthesizer
- Gary Wright – organ
- Jesse Ed Davis – electric guitar
- Klaus Voormann – bass
- Jim Keltner – drums
- uncredited – backing vocals

== Sources ==
- Dale C. Allison Jr., The Love There That's Sleeping: The Art and Spirituality of George Harrison, Continuum (New York, NY, 2006; ISBN 978-0-8264-1917-0).
- Keith Badman, The Beatles Diary Volume 2: After the Break-Up 1970–2001, Omnibus Press (London, 2001; ISBN 0-7119-8307-0).
- Harry Castleman & Walter J. Podrazik, All Together Now: The First Complete Beatles Discography 1961–1975, Ballantine Books (New York, NY, 1976; ISBN 0-345-25680-8).
- Alan Clayson, George Harrison, Sanctuary (London, 2003; ISBN 1-86074-489-3).
- Peter Doggett, You Never Give Me Your Money: The Beatles After the Breakup, It Books (New York, NY, 2011; ISBN 978-0-06-177418-8).
- The Editors of Rolling Stone, Harrison, Rolling Stone Press/Simon & Schuster (New York, NY, 2002; ISBN 0-7432-3581-9).
- Joshua M. Greene, Here Comes the Sun: The Spiritual and Musical Journey of George Harrison, John Wiley & Sons (Hoboken, NJ, 2006; ISBN 978-0-470-12780-3).
- George Harrison, I Me Mine, Chronicle Books (San Francisco, CA, 2002; ISBN 0-8118-3793-9).
- Kevin Howlett, liner-note essay, Extra Texture (Read All About It) CD booklet (Apple Records, 2014; produced by George Harrison).
- Elliot J. Huntley, Mystical One: George Harrison – After the Break-up of the Beatles, Guernica Editions (Toronto, ON, 2006; ISBN 1-55071-197-0).
- Ian Inglis, The Words and Music of George Harrison, Praeger (Santa Barbara, CA, 2010; ISBN 978-0-313-37532-3).
- Peter Lavezzoli, The Dawn of Indian Music in the West, Continuum (New York, NY, 2006; ISBN 0-8264-2819-3).
- Simon Leng, While My Guitar Gently Weeps: The Music of George Harrison, Hal Leonard (Milwaukee, WI, 2006; ISBN 1-4234-0609-5).
- Chip Madinger & Mark Easter, Eight Arms to Hold You: The Solo Beatles Compendium, 44.1 Productions (Chesterfield, MO, 2000; ISBN 0-615-11724-4).
- Robert Rodriguez, Fab Four FAQ 2.0: The Beatles' Solo Years, 1970–1980, Backbeat Books (Milwaukee, WI, 2010; ISBN 978-1-4165-9093-4).
- Nicholas Schaffner, The Beatles Forever, McGraw-Hill (New York, NY, 1978; ISBN 0-07-055087-5).
- Mat Snow, "George Harrison: Quiet Storm", Mojo, November 2014, pp. 66–73.
- Bruce Spizer, The Beatles Solo on Apple Records, 498 Productions (New Orleans, LA, 2005; ISBN 0-9662649-5-9).
- Gary Tillery, Working Class Mystic: A Spiritual Biography of George Harrison, Quest Books (Wheaton, IL, 2011; ISBN 978-0-8356-0900-5).
- Bob Woffinden, The Beatles Apart, Proteus (London, 1981; ISBN 0-906071-89-5).
