= Grey Cloudy Lies =

Song by George Harrison

from the album Extra Texture (Read All About It)
- Released: 22 September 1975
- Genre: Rock, soul
- Length: 3:41
- Label: Apple
- Songwriter: George Harrison
- Producer: George Harrison

"Grey Cloudy Lies" is a song by English rock musician George Harrison from his 1975 album Extra Texture (Read All About It). Harrison wrote it in 1973 during a period that he characterised as his "naughty" years, coinciding with the failure of his marriage to Pattie Boyd and his divergence from the ascetic path of his Hindu-aligned faith. He returned to the song two years later when filled with despondency and self-doubt in response to the scathing reviews that his 1974 North American tour with Ravi Shankar and Dark Horse album had received from several music critics.

Harrison recorded "Grey Cloudy Lies" in Los Angeles at a time when his disenchantment was increased through excessive use of cocaine. The track typifies the sombre, keyboard-oriented sound of Extra Texture, in comparison with the multitracked guitars typical of Harrison's previous work as a solo artist. Aside from musical contributions by David Foster, Jesse Ed Davis and Jim Keltner, the recording features Harrison playing various parts on ARP and Moog synthesizers. The song has received unfavourable comments from several reviewers, and particularly from some of Harrison's spiritual biographers. One of these, Dale Allison, describes the track as a "relentlessly despondent offering", while author Ian Inglis views it as a song of "great charm, energy, and beauty".

== Background ==
It really is a test. I either finish the tour ecstatically happy or I'll end up going back into my cave for another five years.

— George Harrison to Melody Maker, on the eve of his 1974 tour

George Harrison said he wrote "Grey Cloudy Lies" in 1973 on an upright piano in the hall of his Oxfordshire home, Friar Park, about eighteen months before its release in September 1975. In his 1980 autobiography, I, Me, Mine, he attributes the song to his "naughty" period of 1973–74, when he indulged in rock star-type excess in response to the failure of his marriage to Pattie Boyd. This behaviour marked a deviation from the spiritual path he had espoused on his 1973 album Living in the Material World. Having recently purchased Bhaktivedanta Manor in Hertfordshire for the Hare Krishna movement, Harrison visited their leader, Swami Prabhupada, at the property in August 1973 and shared his doubts. Harrison told Prabhupada that he feared alienating his loved ones through his commitment, and that he alternated between long periods of devotion to Krishna and others when he "turn[ed] into a demon again".

Harrison reaffirmed his commitment while visiting India in early 1974, when he also planned a joint concert tour with Indian classical musician Ravi Shankar for later that year. The tour was the first in North America by a member of the Beatles since the band's visit in August 1966, and the only major tour Harrison would undertake as a solo artist. Harrison had been keen to present rock audiences with a new concert experience – one that blended Shankar's Music Festival from India orchestra with his own, jazz-funk inspired musical direction, while also promoting a Krishna-conscious message. Instead, the tour frustrated music critics and fans who were nostalgic for the Beatles, and many reviewers were scathing in their assessment of the concerts. Chief among these detractors was Rolling Stone magazine, which, amid what author Elliot Huntley terms the "tsunami of bile" unleashed on Harrison following the tour, used its review of his delayed Dark Horse album to attack him personally and as an artist. Writing in the 2002 Rolling Stone Press tribute book Harrison, Mikal Gilmore said that Harrison felt "battered" as a result of this critical mauling, which, combined with the failure of his marriage in 1974, led to a period of depression.

Harrison returned to the United States in February 1975 to oversee projects by artists signed to his Dark Horse record label in Los Angeles, and in order to spend time with his new girlfriend, Olivia Arias, in her hometown. Having not written any songs since the previous October, he revisited "Grey Cloudy Lies", together with some other old or unfinished compositions, for inclusion on a new album, titled Extra Texture (Read All About It). With regard to "Grey Cloudy Lies" and the similarly downbeat "World of Stone", Arias recalls that Harrison "was being very hard on himself at that time".

== Composition ==
Although in his autobiography he makes light of the song's significance, during a 1987 interview with Musician magazine, Harrison said he was "in a real down place" when making Extra Texture. (Note: In I, Me, Mine, Harrison offers little detail about the track, and instead makes a pun on the title "Grey Cloudy Lies": "It's about a dishonest Red Indian Chief (JOKE)." Harrison later said that the song "describes the clouds of gloom that used to come over me, a difficulty I had".) In September 1975, during his track-by-track discussion of the album with BBC Radio 1's Paul Gambaccini, he described "Grey Cloudy Lies" as "one of those depressing, 4 o'clock in the morning sort of songs". Harrison biographers Simon Leng, Dale Allison and Gary Tillery each view the composition as alarmingly direct in its depiction of the singer's despair.

Leng identifies a similarity between the song's opening sequence of chords and those in Billy Preston's 1969 single "That's the Way God Planned It", which Harrison produced for the Beatles' Apple record label, yet "Grey Cloudy Lies" is "emotionally a million miles away from that stirring gospel mood". The first verse sets the tone for what Leng describes as "an uncomfortable few minutes":

Now, I thought to close my mouth
With a padlock on the night
Leave the battlefield behind me
Stay out the fight
Not lose my sight.

Harrison quoted these words in his interview with Gambaccini, to illustrate the point that "after talking for a lot, you know, sometimes it's nice to be quiet". The depiction of human life as a battlefield is an allegory commonly associated with the ancient Hindu text Bhagavad Gita, in which the warrior-prince Arjuna is counselled by Krishna in the form of a charioteer. The same theme appears in Harrison's songs from the early 1970s, beginning with "Let It Down". (Note: When expressing doubt about his ability to adhere to a spiritual path in August 1973, Harrison told Swami Prabhupada that he still consulted the Bhagavad Gita regularly. Prabhupada assured him: "If you take risk for Krishna, even if you stand to lose everything, Krishna comes to help and protect. Just like Arjuna. Because Krishna was there with him on the battlefield, he came out victorious. Krishna always protects his devotee.")

Author Ian Inglis says that the song's slowly descending melody "parallels [Harrison's] personal descent into an aimless and isolated existence". Common to Harrison compositions such as "Who Can See It" and "Ding Dong, Ding Dong", its time signature shifts during the verses, implying missed beats within a bar. Harrison told Gambaccini that this rhythmic effect particularly interested him about "Grey Cloudy Lies".

Inglis comments on Harrison's use of words such as "padlock" and "fight" to "immediately conjure images of imprisonment that convey the repressive nature of his life". Another example is the word "pistol", in verse two:

Now, I only want to be
With no pistol at my brain
But at times it gets so lonely
Could go insane
Could lose my aim.

You either go crackers and commit suicide or you try to realise something and attach yourself more strongly to an inner strength.

— Harrison to Crawdaddy, December 1976

Interpretation of the "pistol at my brain" lyric varies among Harrison's biographers. While Leng and Inglis observe that the singer appears to have courted death and even contemplated suicide, Allison, a Christian theologian, attaches significant importance to the line, on an album that he identifies as "the anomaly" in Harrison's solo work, due to the absence of "positive theological statements" in any of the songs. According to Allison: "['Grey Cloudy Lies'] documents the dreadful temptation to commit suicide ... It is natural to guess that the absence of God from the lyrics of Extra Texture mirrors a perceived absence of God in George's personal life; and the emptiness was so intensely troubling that it fostered, at least momentarily, thoughts of taking his own life." Joshua Greene, another religious academic and an ISKCON devotee, instead interprets the song as part of its parent album's "modest appeal for tolerance". "No longer an Arjuna", Greene writes of Harrison's deliberate "religious restraint" on Extra Texture, "all George wanted now was to leave the battlefield behind and simply live 'with no pistol at my brain'." (Note: Citing "The Answer's at the End", which he pairs with "Grey Cloudy Lies" as "part calls for tolerance and part expression of downright despair", Leng also views Harrison's lyrics on the album as representing a calculated toning down of his religious message rather than "a change in fundamental beliefs". In Leng's view, Extra Texture is characterised by a commercial sound in the soul style and "absolutely no references to Krishna".)

Tillery cites the same line as an example of "Grey Cloudy Lies"' place as the "darkest" of the "downbeat tracks" found on most of the album. Tillery also highlights the hopelessness implicit in the song's final verse, where Harrison states he only wants to live "with no teardrops in my eyes", yet "at times there seems like no chance". The song title appears only at the end of this third verse, within the couplet "No clear blue skies / Grey cloudy lies".

Among other Harrison songs of the 1970s, Leng sees thematic parallels between this composition and two Dark Horse tracks that deal with the end of Harrison's marriage to Boyd: "So Sad" and "Bye Bye, Love". (Note: Although Harrison's "Bye Bye, Love" is ostensibly a cover version of the 1957 hit song by the Everly Brothers, it bears little resemblance to the earlier tune musically, and Harrison is credited for having provided "parody lyrics".) These three songs, Leng continues, constitute a cycle of "sheer unhappiness" in the singer's life that was only alleviated by the positive presence of Arias, who, following their marriage in 1978, remained Harrison's life partner until his death in November 2001. Leng also compares "Grey Cloudy Lies" to the posthumously released "Stuck Inside a Cloud", which he terms the lyrical "blood brother" to this 1975 song, due to its "harrowing" description of the cancer that would claim Harrison's life.

== Recording ==
Harrison recorded "Grey Cloudy Lies" in Los Angeles, while immersed in the city's music-business scene – and with it, author Robert Rodriguez notes, "LA's 1970s drug culture" – during the spring and summer of 1975. Harrison's role as owner of A&M-distributed Dark Horse Records saw him overseeing projects there by new signings Attitudes, Stairsteps and Henry McCullough, as well as socialising in circles that he admitted to finding depressing. (Note: One night out became the focus of another Extra Texture track, "Tired of Midnight Blue".) Harrison's friend since the Beatles' Hamburg years, German bassist Klaus Voormann, has spoken of the abundance of drugs at the sessions, particularly cocaine. He said of Harrison: "I didn't like his frame of mind when he was doing this album – I don't play on it too much."

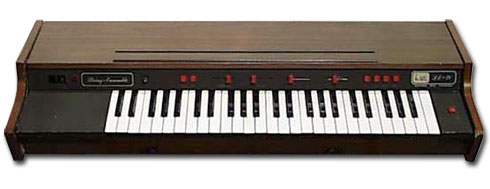
The recording features various parts played by Harrison on an ARP synthesizer.

Harrison taped the basic track for "Grey Cloudy Lies" at A&M Studios in Hollywood on 24 April 1975. (Note: On the same day, Pete Ham, lead singer with the band Badfinger and a friend of Harrison's, hanged himself at home in Surrey. During a radio interview with WNEW-FM's Dave Herman days later, Harrison cited this tragedy as an example of the despondency then prevalent in the music industry, post-1960s, and suggested that Rolling Stone's recent dramatic reversal of editorial opinion about himself was another example. Herman had sought an interview with Harrison out of indignation at how Rolling Stone, Creem and other publications had "murdered" the recent tour, and after he himself had been "blown away" by the New York show he attended.) The line-up on the track was Harrison on electric guitar; David Foster on piano; Jesse Ed Davis on Leslie-effected guitar, played through a wah-wah pedal; Voormann on bass; and drummer Jim Keltner, another regular participant at Harrison recording sessions. In their book Eight Arms to Hold You, Chip Madinger and Mark Easter suggest that Foster may have added his piano part during the album's overdubbing phase, however, between 31 May and 6 June. According to author Bruce Spizer, Harrison was dissatisfied with Voormann's contribution, and so replaced it with a bass part he performed himself on Moog synthesizer. The song also features ARP synthesizer extensively, played by Harrison. Dated 23 June, the album's master-reel tracking sheet lists separate ARP horn, string and "growl" tracks on "Grey Cloudy Lies", in addition to handclaps.

The dominance of keyboards on the recording, particularly ARP synthesizer, was typical of Harrison's choice of instrumentation on Extra Texture and contrasts with what Rodriguez terms "the standard guitar-drenched Harrison sound". In his comments to Gambaccini, Harrison said that he purposefully left space in the arrangement for this and other songs on the album. He also acknowledged that this approach differed from the sound he had achieved earlier in the 1970s, especially in his work with producer Phil Spector. Inglis comments on the track's "dramatic" introduction and a "top-heavy" production that anticipates the power ballad style adopted by Whitney Houston and others during the 1980s.

== Release and reception ==
The song was sequenced as the penultimate track on Extra Texture (Read All About It), between "Tired of Midnight Blue" and "His Name Is Legs". The release took place on 22 September 1975 in the United States and early October in Britain. Although the cover of Melody Maker carried a headline declaring "George Bounces Back!", many reviewers bemoaned the album's preponderance of melancholic ballads such as "Grey Cloudy Lies". According to author Nicholas Schaffner, "even his disciples tended to find the music plodding and aimless."

Dave Marsh of Rolling Stone noted the lack of religious references in the album's lyrics before adding: "But 'Grey Cloudy Lies' makes up in its cathectic repetition of Krishna homiletics for whatever the others have skipped ... Witless and ponderous as any previous hymn to the godhead, they drag Extra Texture down with them after its brief flurry of excitement." In Melody Maker, Ray Coleman said the album was a "lovely collection of songs by a musician with integrity" and that "Grey Cloudy Lies" was "perhaps the most difficult of all the tracks to grab hold of" on initial listening. He also highlighted the song's "unusual chords" and the "especially pretty" piano part.

== Retrospective assessments ==
Among Harrison's biographers, Simon Leng comments on "Grey Cloudy Lies": "Even though Leonard Cohen and, later, the Smiths made a living from songs about depression, the justification for recording a piece like this on what was ostensibly an entertainment product is questionable. This is one of the few Harrisongs that would have been better left in the can." Dale Allison writes: "A profoundly depressing meditation on despair and suicide … One has trouble imagining anyone enjoying it." Elliot Huntley considers the problem to be the musical arrangement rather than the composition itself, and laments how the Moog and ARP synthesizers "seem to soak the song". Writing for the music website Something Else!, Nick DeRiso opines that, with Extra Texture, Harrison "couldn't have strayed further from his religious moorings – or from the free-spirited uplift that made his initial post-Beatles projects such pleasant surprises", and he dismisses "Grey Cloudy Lies" as "one of [the album's] most wrist-slashingly awful songs".

Ian Inglis offers a favourable assessment, describing it as one of Harrison's "simplest and most poignant" compositions, and a song of "great charm, energy, and beauty" with lyrics that have "the status and structure of a poem". Inglis concludes: "Despite the inappropriate production, Harrison gives a memorable performance of a beautiful song, whose absolute honesty is reminiscent of the music of Leonard Cohen and Townes Van Zandt."

Reviewing the 2014 reissue of Extra Texture, for Paste magazine, Robert Ham views "the desperate 'Grey Cloudy Lies'" as a "[moment] when Harrison's focus returns", and a ballad that "cut[s] deep". Shawn Perry of vintagerock.com considers the track to be a highlight of "a creative and introspective album that's aged well", and "a song that, despite its solemn, down-trodden lyrics, resonates with a level of reflection that somehow makes you feel everything is going to be OK". In his review for Classic Rock, Paul Trynka similarly opines that this and other "confessional songs" on Extra Texture have "worn well". Trynka continues: "['Grey Cloudy Lies' is] a dark exploration of the depression into which he'd sunk in 1974, after being mocked for his spiritual homilies. Today, when pop stars swig Cristal and flash their pecs on Instagram, we can appreciate the irony of Harrison being attacked for preaching enlightenment."

== Personnel ==
- George Harrison – vocals, electric guitar, Moog synthesizer, ARP synthesizers, backing vocals
- David Foster – piano
- Jesse Ed Davis – electric guitars
- Jim Keltner – drums

== Sources ==
- Dale C. Allison Jr, The Love There That's Sleeping: The Art and Spirituality of George Harrison, Continuum (New York, NY, 2006; ISBN 978-0-8264-1917-0).
- Keith Badman, The Beatles Diary Volume 2: After the Break-Up 1970–2001, Omnibus Press (London, 2001; ISBN 0-7119-8307-0).
- Harry Castleman & Walter J. Podrazik, All Together Now: The First Complete Beatles Discography 1961–1975, Ballantine Books (New York, NY, 1976; ISBN 0-345-25680-8).
- Alan Clayson, George Harrison, Sanctuary (London, 2003; ISBN 1-86074-489-3).
- The Editors of Rolling Stone, Harrison, Rolling Stone Press/Simon & Schuster (New York, NY, 2002; ISBN 0-7432-3581-9).
- Joshua M. Greene, Here Comes the Sun: The Spiritual and Musical Journey of George Harrison, John Wiley & Sons (Hoboken, NJ, 2006; ISBN 978-0-470-12780-3).
- George Harrison, I Me Mine, Chronicle Books (San Francisco, CA, 2002 [1980]; ISBN 0-8118-3793-9).
- Elliot J. Huntley, Mystical One: George Harrison – After the Break-up of the Beatles, Guernica Editions (Toronto, ON, 2006; ISBN 1-55071-197-0).
- Ian Inglis, The Words and Music of George Harrison, Praeger (Santa Barbara, CA, 2010; ISBN 978-0-313-37532-3).
- Ashley Kahn (ed.), George Harrison on George Harrison: Interviews and Encounters, Chicago Review Press (Chicago, IL, 2020; ISBN 978-1-64160-051-4).
- Peter Lavezzoli, The Dawn of Indian Music in the West, Continuum (New York, NY, 2006; ISBN 0-8264-2819-3).
- Simon Leng, While My Guitar Gently Weeps: The Music of George Harrison, Hal Leonard (Milwaukee, WI, 2006; ISBN 1-4234-0609-5).
- Chip Madinger & Mark Easter, Eight Arms to Hold You: The Solo Beatles Compendium, 44.1 Productions (Chesterfield, MO, 2000; ISBN 0-615-11724-4).
- Robert Rodriguez, Fab Four FAQ 2.0: The Beatles' Solo Years, 1970–1980, Backbeat Books (Milwaukee, WI, 2010; ISBN 978-1-4165-9093-4).
- Robert Rodriguez, Solo in the 70s: John, Paul, George, Ringo: 1970–1980, Parading Press (Downers Grove, IL, 2013; ISBN 978-0-9892555-0-9).
- Nicholas Schaffner, The Beatles Forever, McGraw-Hill (New York, NY, 1978; ISBN 0-07-055087-5).
- Howard Sounes, Fab: An Intimate Life of Paul McCartney, HarperCollins (London, 2010; ISBN 978-0-00-723705-0).
- Bruce Spizer, The Beatles Solo on Apple Records, 498 Productions (New Orleans, LA, 2005; ISBN 0-9662649-5-9).
- Gary Tillery, Working Class Mystic: A Spiritual Biography of George Harrison, Quest Books (Wheaton, IL, 2011; ISBN 978-0-8356-0900-5).
