= Extra Texture (Read All About It) =

Studio album by George Harrison
- Released: 22 September 1975
- Recorded: 21 April – 9 June 1975, August–September 1974, 2–3 February 1971
- Studios: A&M, Hollywood; FPSHOT, Oxfordshire; Abbey Road, London
- Genres: Rock, soul
- Length: 41:53
- Label: Apple
- Producer: George Harrison

George Harrison chronology
| Dark Horse (1974) | Extra Texture (Read All About It) (1975) | The Best of George Harrison (1976) |

Singles from Extra Texture (Read All About It)
- 1. "You" Released: 12 September 1975 (UK); 2. "This Guitar (Can't Keep from Crying)" Released: 8 December 1975 (US)

Extra Texture (Read All About It) is the sixth studio album by the English musician George Harrison, released on 22 September 1975. It was Harrison's final album under his contract with Apple Records and EMI, and the last studio album issued by Apple. The release came nine months after his troubled 1974 North American tour with Ravi Shankar and the poorly received Dark Horse album.

Among Harrison's post-Beatles solo releases, Extra Texture is the only album on which his lyrics are devoid of any obvious spiritual message. It was recorded mostly in the United States rather than England, while Harrison was working in Los Angeles in his role as head of Dark Horse Records.

Gary Wright, David Foster, Jim Keltner, Jesse Ed Davis, Leon Russell, Tom Scott, Billy Preston and Jim Horn were among the many contributing musicians. The keyboard-heavy arrangements incorporate elements of soul music and the influence of Smokey Robinson, signalling a further departure from the rock and folk-rock sound of Harrison's popular early-1970s work. Contrasting with the musical content, the album's art design conveys an upbeat mood and includes an unusual die-cut cover with a textured surface.

Although critical reception to the album was largely unfavourable, Extra Texture was certified gold by the Recording Industry Association of America within two months of release. It produced a hit single in the Motown-inspired "You", originally recorded in London in 1971 with co-producer Phil Spector. The album also includes "This Guitar (Can't Keep from Crying)", which was both a sequel to Harrison's 1968 composition "While My Guitar Gently Weeps" and a rebuttal to his detractors. The album was remastered and reissued in September 2014, as part of the Harrison box set The Apple Years 1968–75.

== Background ==
When I got off the plane and back home, I went into the garden and I was so relieved. That was the nearest I got to a nervous breakdown. I couldn't even go into the house.

— George Harrison, discussing his return to Friar Park after the 1974 North American tour

In its 13 February 1975 issue, Rolling Stone magazine derided George Harrison's North American tour with Ravi Shankar over November–December 1974, and the accompanying Dark Horse album, as "disastrous". Previously viewed as "the surprise winner of the ex-Beatle sweepstakes", in the words of author Nicholas Schaffner – the dark horse – Harrison had disappointed many fans of his former group by failing to acknowledge the Beatles' legacy, both in the content of his 1974 shows and in his dealings with the media. In addition, his commitment to launching his Dark Horse record label had left Harrison rushing to finish the album while rehearsing for the concerts; as a result, he contracted laryngitis and sang hoarse on many of the recordings and throughout the tour. While Dark Horse sold well initially in America, it failed to place at all on Britain's top 50 albums chart. (Note: By contrast, all of Harrison's album releases over 1970–73 – All Things Must Pass, The Concert for Bangladesh and Living in the Material World – had either topped or peaked at number 2 on both the UK's official albums chart and the US chart compiled by Billboard magazine.)

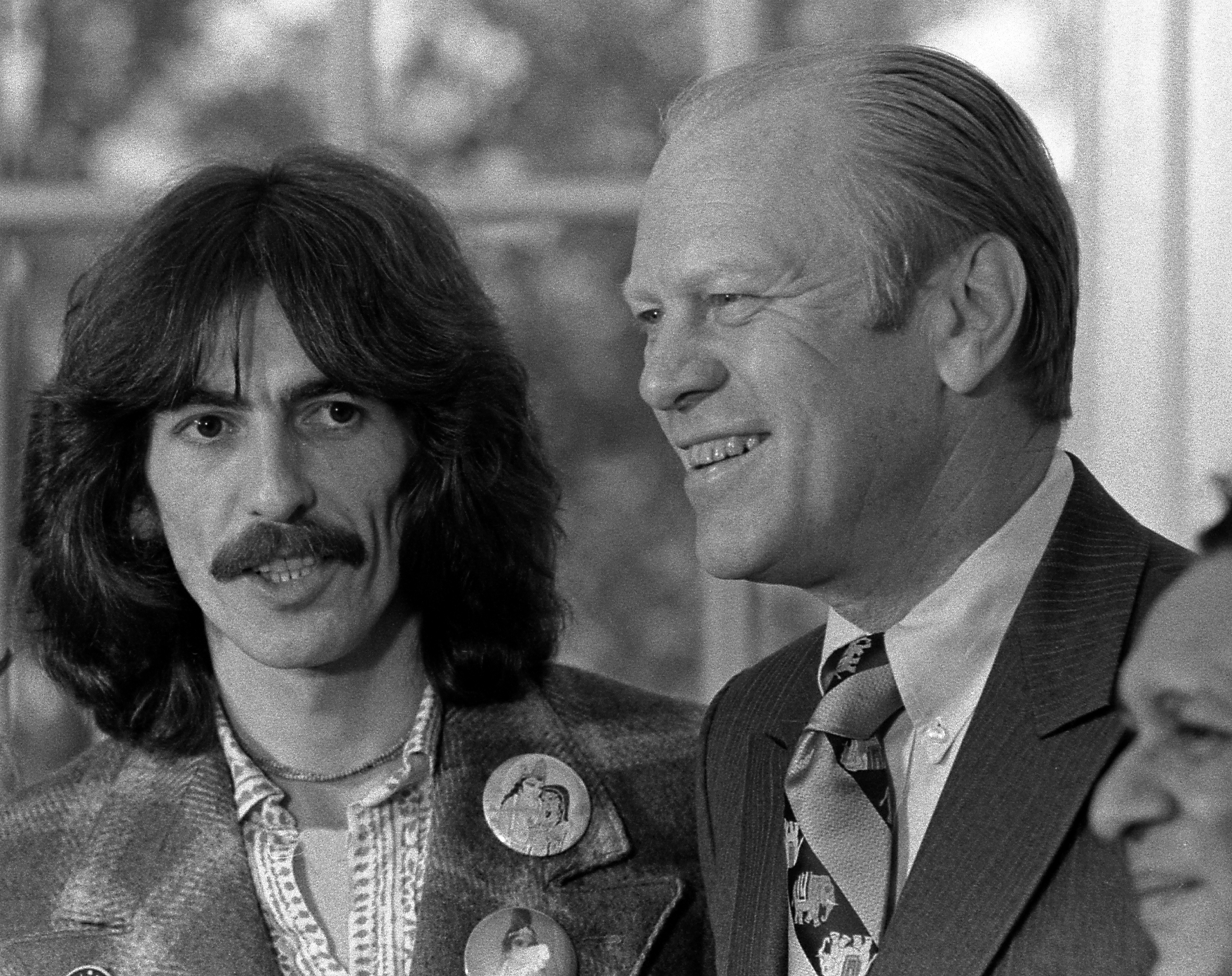
Harrison, US president Gerald Ford and Ravi Shankar at the White House in December 1974, towards the end of the tour

Despite Harrison's claims during the tour that the negative press only made him more determined, the criticism hit him hard, following the end of his marriage to Pattie Boyd. In a radio interview with Dave Herman of WNEW-FM in April 1975, recorded in Los Angeles, Harrison said that he accepted the validity of professional criticism, but objected when it came continually from "one basic source"; then, he added, it became "a personal thing". Author Simon Leng writes that the "bitterness and dismay" Harrison felt manifested itself on his follow-up to Dark Horse, titled Extra Texture (Read All About It), which would be the final studio album issued on the Beatles' Apple record label.

The album came about while Harrison was in Los Angeles overseeing projects by some of his Dark Horse signings, one of which, Splinter, became unavailable to attend sessions booked for them at A&M Studios. Although Harrison was unimpressed with the recording facility, he chose to use the vacated studio time himself. Authors Chip Madinger and Mark Easter suggest that this decision was influenced by his business relationship with A&M Records, who were Dark Horse's worldwide distributor and the company with which Harrison was widely expected to sign as a solo artist, following the expiration of his EMI/Capitol-affiliated Apple contract in January 1976. Having barely written a song in the six months since completing Dark Horse, in late October 1974, he swiftly completed some half-finished compositions and wrote "a couple of new ones". Leng cites these circumstances, together with Harrison's eagerness "to cut a new album as soon as possible, to extricate himself from the Capitol/EMI contract", as part of an expedient quality that defines Extra Texture.

== Songs ==
Writing for Rolling Stone in 2002, Mikal Gilmore commented that "the crises [Harrison] faced in the mid-1970s changed him", and that depression was a key factor. Depression permeated many of the songs that Harrison wrote during this period, an issue that was not helped by his continued heavy drinking and cocaine use. While viewing this mindset as an extension of the artist's "unholy coping mechanisms" over 1973–74, author Robert Rodriguez writes: "What's interesting is how he chose to address what he'd been grappling with, musically. In the end, Extra Texture is unique within the Harrison catalog as essentially an LP-length excursion into soul [music]."

With this new album of mine, all I want is to be able to sing the tunes I have and to do them as warm and as simple as possible ... You know, I don't see my music anymore as being top 20 somehow ... It matters more to me that I can simply sing it better, play it better and, with less orchestration, get over more feeling.

— Harrison to WNEW-FM, April 1975

Lyrically, "The Answer's at the End", "This Guitar (Can't Keep from Crying)", "World of Stone" and "Grey Cloudy Lies" all steer clear of his usual subject matter – Hindu spirituality – and instead appear to ask the listener for compassion. According to author and theologian Dale Allison, Extra Texture is "the sole Harrison album that fails to make any positive theological statements". Allison adds that its "confused melancholy" provides a sharp contrast with the "confident religious advocacy" of the artist's previous successes All Things Must Pass (1970) and Living in the Material World (1973). Harrison's wavering from his Krishna-conscious path was most evident in "World of Stone", writes author Gary Tillery: "'Such a long way from home,' he says, but in his autobiography he renders it, 'Such a long way from OM' – confessing inner turmoil at having strayed from his faith." The same despair was evident in "Grey Cloudy Lies", a track that Harrison described to Paul Gambaccini in September 1975 as "one of those depressing, 4 o'clock in the morning sort of songs". (Note: The lyrics to "Grey Cloudy Lies" include the lines "Now I only want to be / With no pistol at my brain", a statement that Allison and author Ian Inglis interpret as a reference to Harrison's possibly suicidal frame of mind.)

Harrison had begun writing "World of Stone", "Grey Cloudy Lies" and the soul-pop love song "Can't Stop Thinking About You" in 1973. He started "This Guitar (Can't Keep from Crying)" in Hawaii over Christmas 1974, while holidaying with his new girlfriend (later his wife), Olivia Arias, a secretary at Dark Horse's LA office. The song is a sequel to Harrison's popular Beatles track "While My Guitar Gently Weeps", and the lyrics serve as a rebuttal to his critics, particularly Rolling Stone, whose savaging of the tour he would never forgive.

Harrison wrote "Tired of Midnight Blue" in Los Angeles, where he continued to be based for much of 1975 on business relating to Dark Horse Records. (Note: After Splinter and Ravi Shankar had inaugurated the label, in May 1974, Harrison had signed the US-based acts Jiva, Stairsteps, Henry McCullough and Attitudes to Dark Horse.) In his 1980 autobiography, I, Me, Mine, he says that the song's lyrics focused on his "depressed" state following a night in an LA club with "a lot of grey-haired naughty people". In Tillery's estimation, with its chorus line "Made me chill right to the bone", "Tired of Midnight Blue" was Harrison reaching "rock bottom". As the most obvious example of his embracing of soul music on the album, he wrote "Ooh Baby (You Know That I Love You)" as the first of two tributes to Smokey Robinson, a singer whose work with the Miracles he had admired since the early 1960s. (Note: The second Robinson tribute was "Pure Smokey", which Harrison went on to record for his 1976 album Thirty Three & 1/3.)

In addition to these compositions, Harrison revisited two unused recordings: the Motown-styled "You", and "His Name Is Legs (Ladies and Gentlemen)", which open and close the album, respectively. Co-produced with Phil Spector in London, "You" was among the basic tracks taped in February 1971 for a planned Apple solo album by Spector's wife, Ronnie, formerly Veronica Bennett of the Ronettes. A reprise of the completed song, in the form of a brief instrumental titled "A Bit More of You", also appears on Extra Texture, opening side two in the LP format. "His Name Is Legs" was recorded at Harrison's Friar Park studio, FPSHOT, shortly before the 1974 tour, with Billy Preston, Tom Scott, Willie Weeks and Andy Newmark. In a private joke that few listeners were able to appreciate, the song features a hard-to-decipher monologue performed by "Legs" Larry Smith, formerly a member of Bonzo Dog Doo Dah Band. The inclusion of these two older tracks provided some upbeat material on an album predominantly filled with ballads.

== Production ==
=== Recording ===
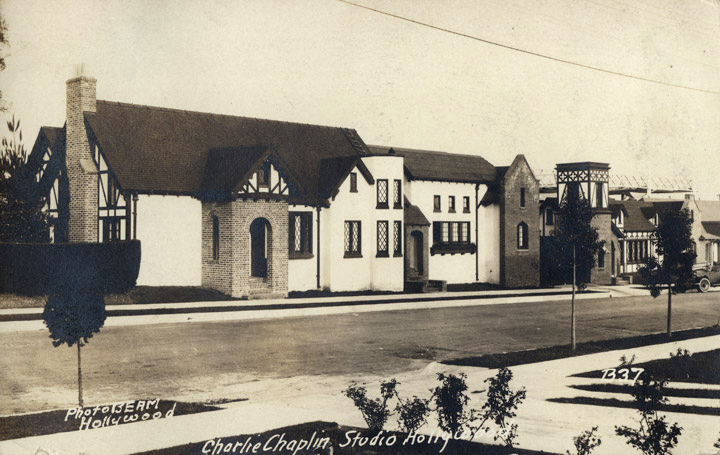
A&M Records' headquarters (including the company's recording studios), pictured in 1922 in their former guise as Charlie Chaplin Studios

Alone among the studio albums that Harrison released between the break-up of the Beatles and his death in 2001, (Note: The posthumously issued Brainwashed (2002) was finished at producer Jeff Lynne's studio in Los Angeles in 2002, after the main recording had taken place at FPSHOT and in Switzerland. Otherwise, except for this 1975 release, the majority of the work on all Harrison albums since 1970 took place at either FPSHOT or other studios in England.) most of the recording for Extra Texture was carried out in the United States. The sessions took place on part of A&M's block along La Brea Avenue in Hollywood, where both the studio and the record company were based. Throughout the spring and summer of 1975, Harrison regularly attended Dark Horse's office, located in a bungalow shared with A&M-distributed Ode Records, and otherwise became fully involved in the Los Angeles music scene. Shortly before starting work on the album, he was among the guests at Wings' party on the Queen Mary ocean liner, at Long Beach, where a "drawn"-looking Harrison was seen socialising with Paul McCartney for the first time since the Beatles' break-up five years before. Often accompanied by Arias, Harrison caught shows by Bob Marley & the Wailers, Smokey Robinson and Santana, socialised with Ringo Starr, and met up with Preston and Ronnie Wood backstage after one of the Rolling Stones' concerts at the LA Forum. New friends such as Eric Idle entered Harrison's social circle that summer, although the Python's influence only extended to Extra Texture's quirky artwork and packaging rather than its musical content.

With Norman Kinney as engineer, Harrison recorded the basic tracks for the new songs between 21 April and 7 May 1975, beginning with "Tired of Midnight Blue" and "The Answer's at the End". Among the musicians on the album were many of Harrison's previous collaborators and associates, including Jim Keltner (drums), Gary Wright (keyboards), Jesse Ed Davis (guitar), Klaus Voormann (bass), and Tom Scott, Jim Horn and Chuck Findley (all horns). Along with Keltner, the most regular participant was a young David Foster, then the piano player in Keltner's band, Attitudes, while the group's bassist and singer, Paul Stallworth, also contributed. On what would turn out to be a keyboard-dominated sound, Leon Russell and Nicky Hopkins made guest appearances as well.

Voormann, a close friend of Harrison's since 1960, found the atmosphere at the sessions unpleasant; he later cited the heavy drug use typical of the LA music scene, and the ex-Beatle's "frame of mind when he was doing this album". (Note: Recalling the Extra Texture sessions in 2014, Voormann told music journalist Mat Snow: "In LA I was not happy about the way George was developing, and I think he felt embarrassed about that. When they do too much cocaine, people lose their reliability ... It was not the old George.") Keltner, who described his own friendship with Harrison as "like brothers", has similarly spoken of Los Angeles as an unsuitable environment for Harrison during this period, while commenting that Arias "came into the picture at just the right time, a crazy, dark time". With Voormann choosing to absent himself, Harrison played some of the album's bass parts himself, using either ARP or Moog synthesizer.

Where on previous records George was living at home in Friar Park, in LA he was staying in a hotel and he was a big deal. Too many people wanted to get to him, too many bad things were available. He should never have made a record outside Friar Park.

— Jim Keltner, commenting on the Los Angeles recording sessions

=== Overdubbing and mixing ===
After a few weeks' break, the overdubbing phase began at A&M on 31 May. That day, instruments were added to the 1971 basic track for "You", including a saxophone solo (played by Horn), extra keyboards and a second drum part. Over 2–3 June, Scott and Findley overdubbed horns on "Ooh Baby" and "His Name Is Legs". The Foster-arranged strings for "This Guitar", "The Answer's at the End" and "Can't Stop Thinking About You" were recorded between 6 and 9 June. Final mixing of the album's ten songs lasted through July and possibly into August.

Between June and October 1975, Preston's It's My Pleasure album, Peter Skellern's Hard Times and Splinter's Harder to Live were released, and sessions took place in August for Scott's New York Connection. All of these albums include guitar cameos from Harrison (often credited to his pseudonym "Hari Georgeson"), yet his playing on Extra Texture was surprisingly minimal. Harrison's signature instrument since 1970, the slide guitar, appeared significantly on "Tired of Midnight Blue" only, and in his extended solo on "This Guitar", on which he shared the lead guitarist's role with Jesse Ed Davis.

Harrison's voice had fully recovered from the effects of laryngitis, allowing him to reach falsetto and indulge in gospel-style scat singing. In author Alan Clayson's estimation, with Harrison adopting a new, "close-miked" soft vocal style, much of Extra Texture reflected "the more feathery emanations from Philadelphia by the likes of The Stylistics and Jerry Butler". (Note: During this period, Harrison cited Smokey Robinson as a major influence, and Stevie Wonder and Bob Marley as other examples of his preferred listening.) Leng considers that Harrison "was clearly targeting the mainstream U.S. audience" and adds: "There were few spiritual lyrics and absolutely no references to Krishna, while his much-criticized vocals were stronger, but recorded at a low level, as if the goal was to create a Harrison soul album for lovers."

== Album artwork and title ==
Inner-sleeve picture of Harrison, taken by 1974 tour photographer Henry Grossman; copyright Apple Records

The album's art design was credited to Capitol's in-house designer, Roy Kohara. Harrison supplied sketches for each item of the artwork, which adopted a humorous, "wacky" theme throughout the packaging. The vivid-orange front cover featured a die-cut design around the words "EXTRA TEXTURE", through which an inner-sleeve, blue-tinted picture of Harrison was visible. Some vinyl editions presented the words as simple blue text on an orange background, however, doing away with the expensive cut-out detail. In keeping with the album title, the thin cardboard used for the LP cover was similar in texture to the "animal skin used on a football", according to Beatles author Bruce Spizer. The front cover included an Om symbol, positioned below the angled title text and also coloured blue. On the back of the inner sleeve, there was a second Henry Grossman tour photo of Harrison, enjoying himself on stage.

Seen as a joke referencing the demise of the Beatles' record label, the Apple logo was styled on Extra Texture as an eaten-away apple core. In addition, the blue inner-sleeve photo of Harrison – "grinning like a Monty Python choirboy", in the words of music critic Robert Christgau – was captioned "OHNOTHIMAGEN" ("Oh not him again"), which was Harrison's self-deprecating take on his dwindling popularity in 1974–75. The album's full title referenced the media outcry during and immediately after his US tour; it was a pun on the slogan that street-corner paperboys would yell out to sell late-breaking news editions of their newspapers: "Extra! Extra! Read all about it!" Harrison had intended to call the album Ohnothimagen, until a studio discussion with Paul Stallworth suggested an alternative. According to Harrison, just as he himself was talking about an overdub needing something "extra", Stallworth happened to say the word "texture".

As Dark Horse had the contributing musicians for each song listed on the album's custom inner sleeve, this time, Harrison listed them on the LP's back cover, but with an additional list for those not appearing. The first of these is guitarist Danny Kortchmar, the fourth member of Attitudes; others include Derek Taylor, Eric Idle, Peter Sellers and Dark Horse executive Dino Airali.

== Release ==
Appearing nine months after Dark Horse, Extra Texture (Read All About It) was completed more quickly than any of Harrison's previous post-Beatles solo albums. The haste with which it was made was out of character for Harrison, and apparently symbolic of a wish to redeem himself with his audience before he left EMI for A&M Records. Preceded by its advance single, "You" backed with "World of Stone", the album was issued on 22 September 1975 in America (as Apple SW 3420) and on 3 October in Britain (Apple PAS 10009). Coinciding with the release of Extra Texture, Harrison's interview with Herman was broadcast on many stations around the US. (Note: The interview was sufficiently popular to gain release as a bootleg record, titled A Conversation with George Harrison (Hear All About It).)

In another departure from past form, Harrison undertook promotion for his new album in Britain. One of these activities, broadcast on 6 September, was his track-by-track discussion with Paul Gambaccini on the BBC Radio 1 show Rockweek. The same day, Melody Maker published an interview with Harrison, the magazine's cover declaring: "George Bounces Back!" Although he later admitted to being "in a real down place" while making the album, the Melody Maker interview found Harrison in good humour, pointing the way to a return in form the following year; "I'd rather be an ex-Beatle than an ex-Nazi!" he joked, referring to his recent uneasy experience with the musical John, Paul, George, Ringo … and Bert. Harrison's other activities in late 1975 likewise centred on comedy, beginning with his production of Monty Python's single "The Lumberjack Song", released in November, and including a humorous star turn, again with Eric Idle, on Rutland Weekend Television's Christmas special.

Extra Texture peaked at number 8 on the Billboard Top LPs & Tape chart on 25 October, holding the position for three weeks, and was certified gold by the Recording Industry Association of America on 11 November. The album marked a welcome, though brief, return for Harrison to the official UK Albums Chart (now a top 60), reaching number 16 there in late October. "You" peaked at number 20 on Billboard's Hot 100 singles listings, while in the UK, despite the song receiving substantial airplay on Radio 1, its highest position was number 38, equalling that of his Dark Horse single "Ding Dong, Ding Dong". As the follow-up to "You", Apple issued "This Guitar (Can't Keep from Crying)" backed by the 1974 album track "Māya Love", in December, with a UK release following in February 1976. Apple's final single in its original incarnation, "This Guitar" failed to chart in either America or Britain, a fate that Rodriguez partly attributes to a lack of promotion from a label that was "[r]unning on fumes".

=== Reissue ===
Extra Texture (Read All About It) was remastered for CD release in January 1992. The album was remastered again and reissued in September 2014, as both a separate release and as part of the Harrison box set The Apple Years 1968–75. The 2014 reissue includes a liner note essay by radio producer and author Kevin Howlett, and adds a new version of "This Guitar", based on a demo that Harrison recorded in 1992 for Dave Stewart. Previously issued only as a digital download for the latter's Platinum Weird project, in 2006, the track features overdubs from Stewart, Harrison's son Dhani, Ringo Starr and singer Kara DioGuardi. Previewing the release on georgeharrison.com, Olivia Harrison spoke of the "strong melodies and thought-provoking lyrics" of many of the songs on Extra Texture, adding: "They are moody and personal and some of my favourites."

== Critical reception ==
=== Contemporary reviews ===
Discussing the album's reception in his 1977 book The Beatles Forever, Nicholas Schaffner wrote: "Harrison's worldly critics, who had long found his sermons insufferable, responded like bulls to a red flag to Extra Texture, which contains a number of treatises on how reviewers always 'miss the point.'" Even Harrison's loyal "disciples", Schaffner continued, tended to view the album as "plodding and aimless". Rolling Stone's reviewer, Dave Marsh, highlighted "You" as a return to All Things Must Pass-style grandeur, and "Can't Stop Thinking About You" and "Tired of Midnight Blue" as "the most effective nine minutes of music" the artist had made since 1970. Generally, on an album that was "sketchy at best", however, Marsh bemoaned the over-reliance on "merely competent" keyboards and Harrison's "affectingly feeble voice", before concluding: "Harrison is no longer a Beatle, as he has reminded us more than we have asked. But if he learned nothing else from his experience in that organization, it ought to have been that a good guitar player isn't worth much without a band."

In the NME, Neil Spencer wrote that "Though Extra Texture isn't the Harrison revival that many might have hopes for, it's still several leagues superior to Hari's more recent efforts; and just as All Things Must Pass would have made a great single album, so Extra Texture would make a more than commendable single side." Spencer described the album's content as "the customary mournful and doom-laden Harrison we've come to know and fear, only this time the rigours of love take precedence over matters spiritual", and he advised his readers: "I've played it, I don't mind it ... Hari fans can anticipate purchase with glee. Others approach with cautious optimism." Reviewing for Melody Maker, Ray Coleman described it as "splendid" and approved of Harrison's return to his 1960s musical influences. Coleman especially admired the first three songs and said that the album was a "re-statement of the fundamentals we should all cherish".

In the 1977 edition of their book The Beatles: An Illustrated Record, Roy Carr and Tony Tyler described Extra Texture as "another lugubrious offering" and concluded: "the needle of the listener's personal Ecstatograph points sullenly towards zero throughout." Harrison's pleas for tolerance and understanding, like his self-deprecation on the album sleeve, seemed to backfire. (Note: Harrison himself acknowledged in a January 1976 BBC interview: "People who were never really keen on me just really hate my guts right now. It has become complete opposites, completely black and white.") Writing in 1981, Bob Woffinden found that the album showed signs that Harrison was "no longer so scornful of his audience" compared with Dark Horse. Woffinden wrote of the songs that "plead plaintively with critics not to judge too severely": "In this different context, such pleas are more sympathetic. Very well, then, we will not. Extra Texture wasn't really very good musically ... but it did have some appealing qualities, and barely any disagreeable ones."

=== Retrospective reviews and legacy ===
Professional ratings
Review scores
| Source | Rating |
|---|---|
| AllMusic | 3.5/5 stars |
| Blender | 2/5 stars |
| Christgau's Record Guide | C− |
| Encyclopedia of Popular Music | 2/5 stars |
| Mojo | 3/5 stars |
| MusicHound | 2/5 |
| Music Story | 3/5 stars |
| OndaRock | 6/10 |
| The Rolling Stone Album Guide | 3/5 stars |
| Uncut | 2/5 stars |

In his book subtitled The Beatles' Solo Years, 1970–1980, Robert Rodriguez features Extra Texture in a chapter dedicated to the worst solo albums released by the four ex-Beatles between 1970 and 1980 – the only one of Harrison's albums to be included there. (Note: By comparison, Rodriguez includes four albums by McCartney and two each by John Lennon and Starr.) Rodriguez writes: "To be sure, Extra Texture boasted several fine cuts ... but the remainder of the collection was almost entirely weary in tone, amounting to a prolonged buzz kill." Nick DeRiso of the music website Something Else! includes it on his list of the five worst solo albums by either John Lennon, McCartney or Harrison, and describes it as a "grinding, relentlessly downbeat album, where even the name Extra Texture has come to feel like a cruel joke".

Several Harrison biographers likewise hold Extra Texture in low esteem, with Alan Clayson describing it as his "artistic nadir" and "a bedsit record rather than a dancing one". Simon Leng writes that Harrison's post-Dark Horse "rehabilitation disc" came way too soon, resulting in an uncharacteristically passionless work, with its singer sounding "punch drunk". Aside from the uplifting "You", both authors identify "Tired of Midnight Blue" as the only saving grace. Gary Tillery notes the "darkly sarcastic" album title for a collection full of such "downbeat" tracks, the darkest of which is "Grey Cloudy Lies". Harrison himself rated Extra Texture as his worst solo release of the 1970s. Speaking to Musician magazine in 1987, he dismissed it as "a grubby album" and added: "The production left a lot to be desired, as did my performance ... Some songs I like, but in retrospect I wasn't very happy about it."

The album has its admirers. Writing in a Rolling Stone Press tribute book, Greg Kot labels Extra Texture as "something of a return to form for Harrison". AllMusic's Richard Ginell views "You", "The Answer's at the End" and "This Guitar (Can't Keep from Crying)" as some of Harrison's best post-Beatles compositions and identifies other "musical blossoms" on a collection that stands up relatively well to the passing of time. Writing in the 2004 Rolling Stone Album Guide, Mac Randall considered it to be an album that "starts off well, then runs out of steam midway through", while John Harris, in his 2011 review for Mojo, described it as "a classic case of contractual obligation" but still a "decided improvement" on Dark Horse. More impressed, Harrison biographer Elliot Huntley admires the album as "a welcome return to form" that offers "some gorgeous love songs, a truly commercial lead single, and flashes of the humour that define George Harrison as a songwriter".

Reviewing the Apple Years box set for Blogcritics, Seattle-based critic Chaz Lipp opines of Extra Texture: "Though not without a few notable tracks, it's the least satisfying album of Harrison's entire career ... The essential cut is the grooving 'Tired of Midnight Blue.'" In his review for Classic Rock, Paul Trynka writes that the album "boasts neither the highs nor lows of its predecessors" and is "the work of a man wounded by criticism". In Trynka's assessment, whereas "You" "sounds dull today", "confessional songs" such as "World of Stone", "Tired of Midnight Blue" and "Grey Cloudy Lies" "have worn well". Writing for the website Vintage Rock, Shawn Perry similarly considers "You" to be "out of sync", and he highlights "This Guitar" and "Grey Cloudy Lies" on "a creative and introspective album that's aged well".

In another 2014 review, for the Lexington Herald-Leader, Walter Tunis writes: "[Extra Texture (Read All About It)] is a delight from the start of the brightly orchestrated pop of 'You' to a series of light soul-savvy reveries that culminate in the playful 'His Name is Legs'. The record places the secular and spiritual concerns of Harrison's music in animated balance to close out The Apple Years in a state of hapless harmony." Writing in Mojo, Tom Doyle concedes that, being the final album in the box set, "It's possibly a downbeat note to end on", but welcomes the reissue for "allow[ing] us time to dig for the diamonds in the dirt".

== Track listing ==
All songs written by George Harrison.

Side one

1. "You" – 3:41
2. "The Answer's at the End" – 5:32
3. "This Guitar (Can't Keep from Crying)" – 4:11
4. "Ooh Baby (You Know That I Love You)" – 3:59
5. "World of Stone" – 4:40

Side two

1. "A Bit More of You" – 0:45
2. "Can't Stop Thinking About You" – 4:30
3. "Tired of Midnight Blue" – 4:51
4. "Grey Cloudy Lies" – 3:41
5. "His Name Is Legs (Ladies and Gentlemen)" – 5:46

2014 remaster bonus track

11. "This Guitar (Can't Keep from Crying)" (Platinum Weird version) – 3:55

== Personnel ==
Track numbering refers to CD and digital releases of the album.

- George Harrison – vocals (1–5, 7–10), electric and acoustic guitars (1–10), ARP synthesizer (3, 9), Moog synthesizer (9), piano (10), backing vocals (1, 2, 7–10)
- David Foster – piano (2, 3, 5, 9), organ (1, 6), ARP string synthesizer (1, 5, 6), electric piano (7), tack piano (10), string arrangement (2, 3, 7)
- Gary Wright – organ (2, 5), electric piano (1, 4, 6), ARP synthesizer (3, 7)
- Jim Gordon – drums (1, 6), percussion (1, 6)
- Jim Keltner – drums (1–9), percussion (8)
- Andy Newmark – drums (10)
- Jesse Ed Davis – electric guitar (3–5, 7, 9)
- Carl Radle – bass guitar (1, 6)
- Paul Stallworth – bass guitar (2, 8), background vocals (7)
- Klaus Voormann – bass guitar (4–5, 7)
- Willie Weeks – bass guitar (10)
- Leon Russell – piano (1, 6, 8)
- Tom Scott – saxophones (4, 10)
- Chuck Findley – trumpet (4, 10), trombone (10)
- Nicky Hopkins – piano (7)
- Jim Horn – saxophone (1, 6)
- Billy Preston – electric piano (10)
- "Legs" Larry Smith – vocal (10)
- Ronnie Spector – vocal (1)
- Norm Kinney – percussion (2)

Supplementary credits for 2014 reissue (track 11)

- George Harrison – vocals, acoustic guitars
- Dave Stewart – electric guitars, bass, organ
- Dhani Harrison – acoustic guitar
- Ringo Starr – drums
- Kara DioGuardi – backing vocals

== Chart positions ==
| Chart (1975–76) | Peak position |
|---|---|
| Australian Kent Music Report | 36 |
| Canadian RPM Top Albums | 63 |
| French SNEP Albums Chart | 19 |
| Japanese Oricon LP Chart | 9 |
| Norwegian VG-Lista Albums | 8 |
| UK Albums Chart | 16 |
| US Billboard Top LPs & Tape | 8 |
| US Cashbox Top 100 Albums | 9 |
| US Record World Album Chart | 9 |

== Certifications ==
| Region | Certification | Certified units/sales |
|---|---|---|
| United States (RIAA) | Gold | 500,000^{^} |
^{^} Shipments figures based on certification alone.

== Sources ==
- Allison, Dale C., Jr. (2006). The Love There That's Sleeping: The Art and Spirituality of George Harrison. New York, NY: Continuum. ISBN 978-0-8264-1917-0.
- Badman, Keith (2001). The Beatles Diary Volume 2: After the Break-Up 1970–2001. London: Omnibus Press. ISBN 0-7119-8307-0.
- Brackett, Nathan; Hoard, Christian, eds. (2004). The New Rolling Stone Album Guide (4th ed.). New York, NY: Fireside/Simon & Schuster. ISBN 0-7432-0169-8.
- Carr, Roy; Tyler, Tony (1978). The Beatles: An Illustrated Record. London: Trewin Copplestone Publishing. ISBN 0-450-04170-0.
- Castleman, Harry; Podrazik, Walter J. (1976). All Together Now: The First Complete Beatles Discography 1961–1975. New York, NY: Ballantine Books. ISBN 0-345-25680-8.
- Clayson, Alan (2003). George Harrison. London: Sanctuary. ISBN 1-86074-489-3.
- The Editors of Rolling Stone (2002). Harrison. New York, NY: Rolling Stone Press/Simon & Schuster. ISBN 0-7432-3581-9.
- Graff, Gary; Durchholz, Daniel, eds. (1999). MusicHound Rock: The Essential Album Guide. Farmington Hills, MI: Visible Ink Press. ISBN 1-57859-061-2.
- Greene, Joshua M. (2006). Here Comes the Sun: The Spiritual and Musical Journey of George Harrison. Hoboken, NJ: John Wiley & Sons. ISBN 978-0-470-12780-3.
- Harrison, George (2002). I Me Mine. San Francisco, CA: Chronicle Books. ISBN 0-8118-3793-9.
- Herman, Dave (24 May 1975). "A Conversation with George Harrison". Capitol Radio. WNEW-FM., (recorded 26–27 April).
- Hunt, Chris, ed. (2005). NME Originals: Beatles – The Solo Years 1970–1980. London: IPC Ignite!.
- Huntley, Elliot J. (2006). Mystical One: George Harrison – After the Break-up of the Beatles. Toronto, ON: Guernica Editions. ISBN 1-55071-197-0.
- Inglis, Ian (2010). The Words and Music of George Harrison. Santa Barbara, CA: Praeger. ISBN 978-0-313-37532-3.
- Kahn, Ashley, ed. (2020). George Harrison on George Harrison: Interviews and Encounters. Chicago, IL: Chicago Review Press. ISBN 978-1-64160-051-4.
- Larkin, Colin (2011). The Encyclopedia of Popular Music (5th ed.). London: Omnibus Press. ISBN 978-0-85712-595-8.
- Lavezzoli, Peter (2006). The Dawn of Indian Music in the West. New York, NY: Continuum. ISBN 0-8264-2819-3.
- Leng, Simon (2006). While My Guitar Gently Weeps: The Music of George Harrison. Milwaukee, WI: Hal Leonard. ISBN 1-4234-0609-5.
- Madinger, Chip; Easter, Mark (2000). Eight Arms to Hold You: The Solo Beatles Compendium. Chesterfield, MO: 44.1 Productions. ISBN 0-615-11724-4.
- Rodriguez, Robert (2010). Fab Four FAQ 2.0: The Beatles' Solo Years 1970–1980. Milwaukee, WI: Hal Leonard. ISBN 978-0-87930-968-8.
- Schaffner, Nicholas (1978). The Beatles Forever. New York, NY: McGraw-Hill. ISBN 0-07-055087-5.
- Snow, Mat (November 2014). "George Harrison: Quiet Storm". Mojo. pp. 66–73.
- Sounes, Howard (2010). Fab: An Intimate Life of Paul McCartney. London: HarperCollins. ISBN 978-0-00-723705-0.
- Spizer, Bruce (2005). The Beatles Solo on Apple Records. New Orleans, LA: 498 Productions. ISBN 0-9662649-5-9.
- Tillery, Gary (2011). Working Class Mystic: A Spiritual Biography of George Harrison. Wheaton, IL: Quest Books. ISBN 978-0-8356-0900-5.
- Woffinden, Bob (1981). The Beatles Apart. London: Proteus. ISBN 0-906071-89-5.
