= The Answer's at the End =

Song by George Harrison

from the album Extra Texture (Read All About It)
- Released: 22 September 1975
- Genre: Rock, soul
- Length: 5:32
- Label: Apple
- Songwriter: George Harrison
- Producer: George Harrison

"The Answer's at the End" is a song by English rock musician George Harrison, released in 1975 on his final album for Apple Records, Extra Texture (Read All About It). Part of the song lyrics came from a wall inscription at Harrison's nineteenth-century home, Friar Park, a legacy of the property's original owner, Sir Frank Crisp. This aphorism, beginning "Scan not a friend with a microscopic glass", had resonated with Harrison since he bought Friar Park in 1970, and it was a quote he often used when discussing his difficult relationship with his former Beatles bandmate Paul McCartney.

Harrison's adaptation of the verse for "The Answer's at the End" coincided with a period of personal upheaval, following the severe criticism afforded his 1974 North American tour by several influential reviewers. In its plea for tolerance and a musical arrangement that includes orchestral strings, the song recalls Harrison's 1970 hit ballad "Isn't It a Pity". The arrangement also bears the influence of Nina Simone's 1972 cover version of "Isn't It a Pity", specifically in a pair of codas performed by Harrison in the soul style.

Harrison recorded "The Answer's at the End" in Los Angeles, where he was overseeing projects relating to his Dark Horse record label during much of 1975. The backing musicians on the recording include members of the Dark Horse Records band Attitudes, among them David Foster and Jim Keltner. As with much of Extra Texture, the song has received a varied response from music critics and Harrison's biographers. On release, Rolling Stone dismissed the track as "padded subterfuge" and overlong, while Melody Maker described it as "majestic" and one of Harrison's "most potent tracks ever, highly emotional and introspective".

== Background and inspiration ==
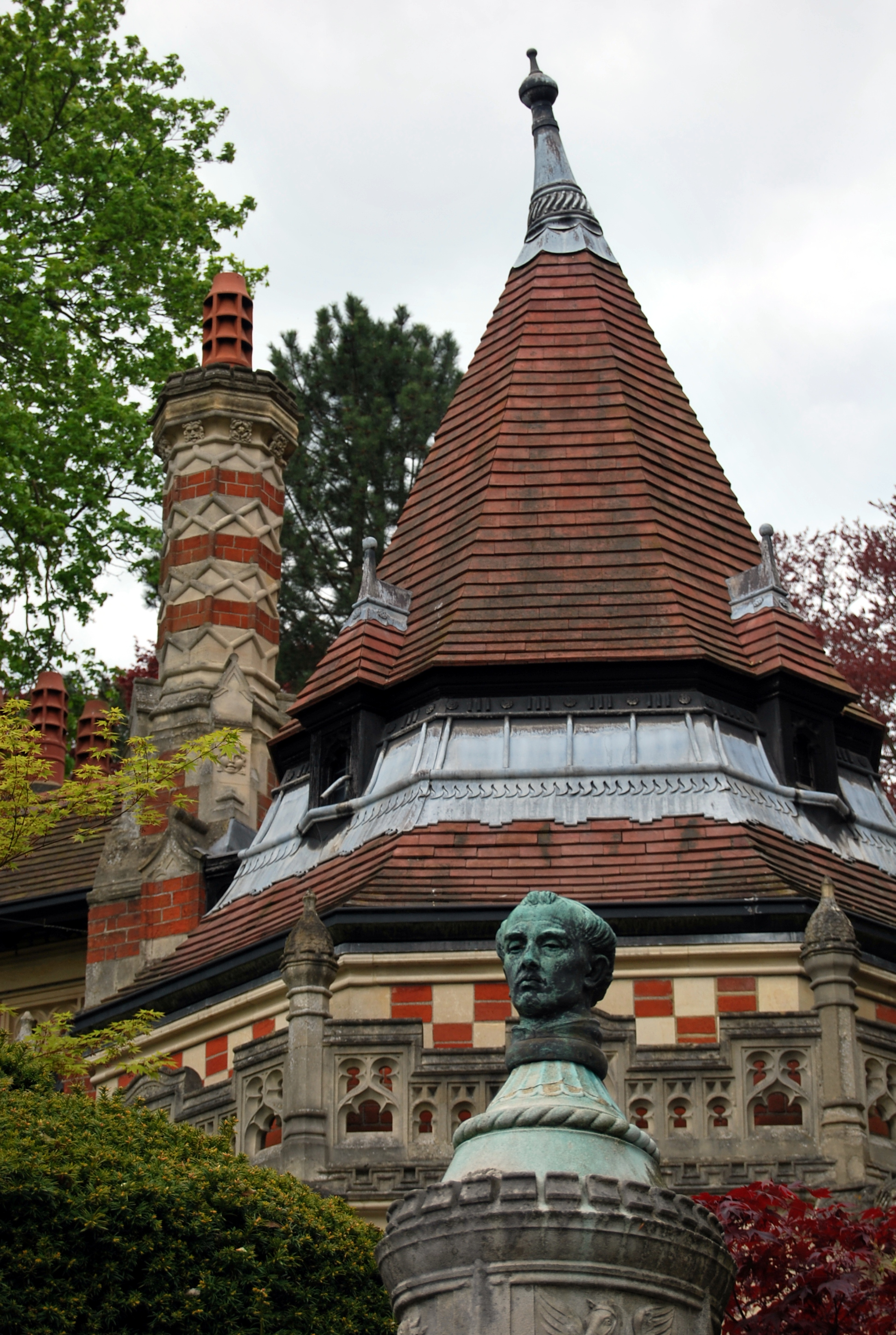
Gatehouse detail at Harrison's Friar Park estate, built by Sir Frank Crisp

In March 1970, George Harrison and his first wife, Pattie Boyd, moved into their Victorian Gothic residence at Friar Park in Henley-on-Thames, Oxfordshire. The 120-room house was built in the 1890s on the site of a thirteenth-century friary by Frank Crisp, a City of London solicitor and microscopist. Harrison was immediately taken with Crisp's penchant for whimsy, the legacies of which included interior features such as doorknobs and light switches shaped as monks' faces (which meant "tweaking" a nose in order to turn each light on), and a carving of a monk's head that showed him smiling on one side and frowning on the other. A keen horticulturalist and an authority on medieval gardening, Crisp established 10 acres of formal gardens, which similarly reflected his eccentric tastes. (Note: Among these outdoor features were caves containing wishing wells, distorting mirrors, model skeletons and, at each entrance, a gnome beside a giant toadstool and a chest of fake jewels. Crisp also designed a series of tiered lakes, the lowest of which was traversed by a bridge that, from the house, made it appear as if someone crossing the bridge was walking on water.)

From midway through the twentieth century until 1969, ownership of Friar Park resided with the Roman Catholic Church. As a result, paint masked some of Crisp's inscriptions inside the house, but outside, signs reading "Don't keep off the grass", "Herons will be prosecuted" and "Eton boys are a Harrowing sight" remained intact. (Note: Visitors to Friar Park have commented especially on the nonsensical "Two Holy Friars" stone carving at the front of the house, which showed a friar holding a frying pan with a hole in it.) Harrison also discovered inscriptions with a more profound meaning, which he described to his Hare Krishna friend Shyamasundar Das as "like songs really, about the devil, about friendship, life". One example was "Shadows we are and shadows we depart", written on a stone sundial; another began: "Scan not a friend with a microscopic glass / You know his faults, now let his foibles pass ..." This four-line verse was written above an entrance-way in a garden wall, and it was an aphorism that Harrison soon took to quoting in interviews. On 28 April 1970, just over two weeks after the Beatles' break-up, he used the words during an interview for New York's WPLQ Radio, as Village Voice reporter Howard Smith repeatedly pushed for details on the animosity between Paul McCartney and the other three Beatles. In October 1974 – towards the end of what Harrison termed a "bad domestic year", following his split with Boyd – he used the same quote in an interview with BBC Radio's Alan Freeman, when again discussing the current relationship among the four ex-Beatles. (Note: Among other instances, Harrison adopted the "Scan not a friend" aphorism in an online chat to promote the 30th anniversary reissue of All Things Must Pass, in January 2001. This time it was in reply to a fan's query: "Does Paul still piss you off? (tell us the truth)".)

Harrison wrote his first Friar Park-inspired composition, "Ballad of Sir Frankie Crisp (Let It Roll)", within two months of moving in. As with the "Crispisms" that surfaced in the lyrics to his 1974 single "Ding Dong, Ding Dong", a number of years elapsed before he incorporated the "Scan not a friend" inscription into a song. In 1975, it provided the central theme to "The Answer's at the End", a composition that, theologian Dale Allison has written, "expresses the personal doubts and religious uncertainty George experienced in the mid-1970s". This temporary uncertainty contrasted with his previous devotion to a Hindu-aligned spiritual path. It was also a period marked by Harrison's excessive use of alcohol and cocaine – a symptom of his despondency following his troubled 1974 North American tour with Ravi Shankar, and the generally unfavourable reception afforded his Dark Horse album.

== Composition ==
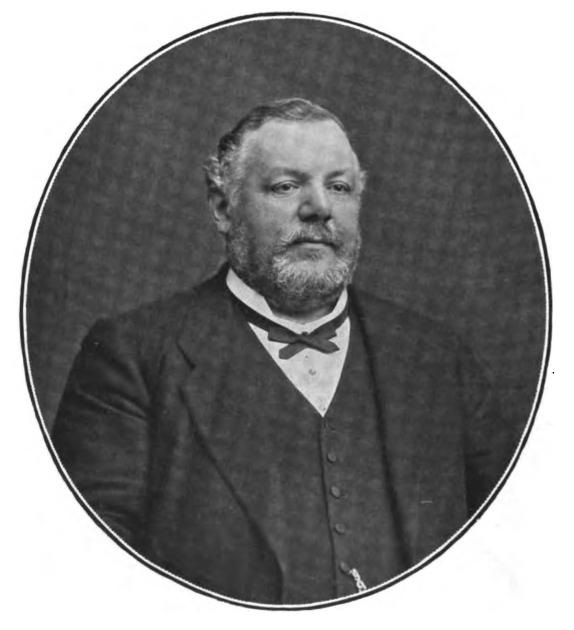
Frank Crisp in 1904. One of the inspirational verses he had carved in stone at Friar Park provided the central theme for Harrison's song.

The song begins in the key of D, before changing key to F for the choruses. In its musical mood, authors Robert Rodriguez and Elliot Huntley liken the released recording to "Isn't It a Pity", which, like "Ballad of Sir Frankie Crisp", was co-produced by Phil Spector and issued on Harrison's 1970 triple album All Things Must Pass. Harrison biographer Simon Leng describes "The Answer's at the End" as a ballad set to a "mellow, reflective soul mood", like much of its parent album, Extra Texture (Read All About It).

According to the way he renders Crisp's inscription in his 1980 autobiography, I, Me, Mine, Harrison made a minor alteration to the original text's third line ("Life is one long enigma, true, my friend") for his opening verse:

Scan not a friend with a microscopic glass
You know his faults, now let his foibles pass
Life is one long enigma, my friend
So read on, read on, the answer's at the end.

In another passage from I, Me, Mine, read out by his son Dhani in the 2011 documentary George Harrison: Living in the Material World, Harrison explains that these words helped him reach a better understanding of human relationships and others around him.

There were disasters all around at that time ... [B]ut the thing about Sir Frank with his advice, like: "scan not a friend with a microscopic glass ..." I mean, that helped me actively to ease up on whomsoever I thought I loved, gave me that consciousness not to hang on to the negative side of it, to be more forgiving.

— George Harrison, 1979

The theme of tolerance is further reflected in the song's chorus, where Harrison urges: "Don't be so hard on the ones that you love / It's the ones that you love, we think so little of ..." The chorus lyrics echo the message of "Isn't It a Pity", in this case, author Ian Inglis writes, providing a "bleak assessment of the human condition".

The second verse begins with an example of what Harrison biographer Alan Clayson views as the "restricted code" found in the lyrics on much of Extra Texture. Harrison sings, "The speech of flowers excels the flowers of speech / But what's often in your heart is the hardest thing to reach" – the second line of which, Allison writes, "is surely [Harrison] talking about his inability to find God, who for him dwells, above all, inside the human being". Allison suggests that, with the singer describing life as first an "enigma" and then a "mystery", the previous certainties of his faith have disappeared; true to the song title, Allison continues, "Only death will reveal ... whether his religious beliefs have been true or false."

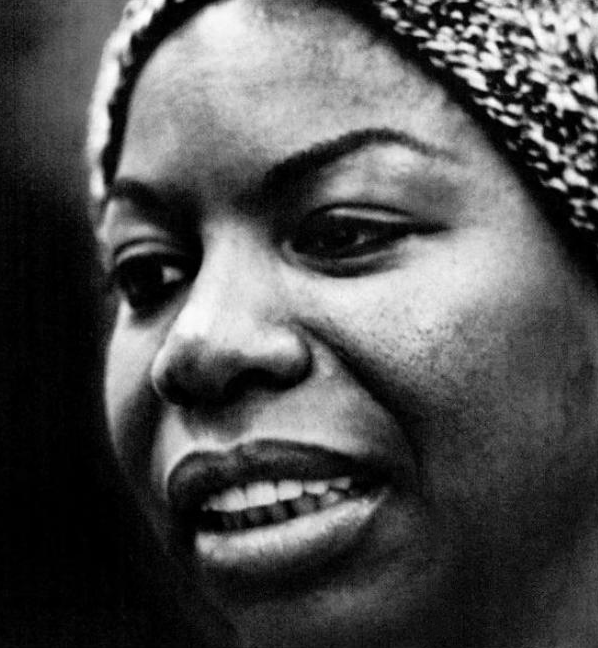
Nina Simone's soulful rendition of Harrison's song "Isn't It a Pity" inspired the two codas in "The Answer's at the End".

As a further reference to the sentiment regarding friendship expressed in "Isn't It a Pity", the middle section of "The Answer's at the End" reflects the influence of Nina Simone's 1972 cover of that earlier song. According to his recollection in I, Me, Mine, Harrison added this section, or coda, when recording "The Answer's at the End". In the lines "And isn't it a pity how / We hurt the ones we love the most of all ...", Inglis notes the influence of the 1944 pop standard "You Always Hurt the One You Love". (Note: Harrison later described his song as being "like a modern version of 'You Always Hurt the One You Love' – 'the one you shouldn't hurt at all'.")

In the final half-verse, following a brief instrumental passage, Harrison personalises the second line of Crisp's text to "You know my faults, now let my foibles pass". Rodriguez remarks that the subject of reserving judgement would have resonated with Harrison at this time, given the "shellacking" he had recently received in music publications such as Rolling Stone. On the released recording, the song fades out during a repeat of the "isn't it a pity how ..." coda.

Among the former Beatle's biographers, interpretations differ over the message of Extra Texture songs such as "The Answer's at the End", with regard to his spirituality. Like Dale Allison, Gary Tillery writes of Extra Texture revealing Harrison's "inner turmoil at having strayed from his faith". Leng views this composition as "a deliberate tempering of tone rather than a change in fundamental beliefs", however, with the song's choruses "attenuat[ing] the search for universal solutions to a simpler, earthbound observation". Joshua Greene similarly writes that Harrison had "regained strength and relaxed his missionary zeal" during 1975. Greene references "The Answer's at the End" while stating that "a modest appeal for tolerance" had now replaced the singer's earlier "exhortations to chant and warnings about rebirth in the material world".

== Recording ==
Harrison taped the basic track for "The Answer's at the End" at A&M Studios in Los Angeles on 22 April 1975. During the previous month, Harrison attended a press party held by McCartney and the latter's band, Wings, on board the Queen Mary at Long Beach. This event marked the first social meeting between the two former bandmates since December 1970 and, according to McCartney biographer Howard Sounes, was evidence of a "Beatles rapprochement", five years after their break-up.

Authors Nicholas Schaffner and Rodriguez have commented on the rushed and expedient nature of the sessions for Extra Texture, an album that saw out Harrison's commitments to EMI-affiliated Apple Records and allowed him to sign with his own, A&M-distributed label, Dark Horse Records. Rather than use his Friar Park studio, Harrison recorded the album at a facility he admitted to finding "technically limiting", since he was in Los Angeles overseeing projects by his various Dark Horse acts when studio time became available, following the cancellation of sessions for Splinter's second album. Another of these acts was Attitudes, a band put together by his friend, session drummer Jim Keltner. "The timing was perfect", Leng writes of Harrison's approach to making Extra Texture, "as this latest signing to Dark Horse provided a ready-made backup band, close at hand."

Although Attitudes guitarist Danny Kortchmar did not play on the album, "The Answer's at the End" was one of two songs that featured all three of the other band members: Keltner, pianist/musical arranger David Foster and bassist/lead singer Paul Stallworth. (Note: The other track on which Foster, Stallworth and Keltner all contribute is "Can't Stop Thinking About You". Contrasting with the melancholic musical content of Extra Texture, Harrison adopted a humorous theme for the album's artwork, which included a list of people "not appearing" on the album, the first of whom was Kortchmar.) Another guest musician on the recording was keyboard player Gary Wright, a regular contributor to Harrison's solo work throughout the 1970s starting with the session for "Isn't It a Pity". A&M engineer Norman Kinney, who had carried out the mix down for The Concert for Bangladesh recordings four years before, added the song's percussion, which the mastering sheet lists as tambourine and shaker. As for all the songs on the album, overdubs on the basic track were carried out between 31 May and 6 June. A string arrangement, written and conducted by Foster, was recorded at A&M on 6 June.

Huntley describes "The Answer's at the End" as "the first of the piano songs" on Extra Texture. While piano and other keyboard instrumentation was typically favoured throughout the album, the song also contains multiple guitar parts, in keeping with the sound more usually associated with Harrison. Credited to Harrison, these parts comprise 12-string acoustic guitar, electric guitar arpeggios over the choruses, and a brief solo. During the quieter, "isn't it a pity how ..." codas, Huntley notes "the merest veneer of the strings" accompanying Harrison's vocal. In Leng's description, Harrison "semi-scats" over these "smoochy" sections, "gospel style, over sundown jazz piano" – a vocal affectation that reflected his immersion in the soul genre. Following the first coda, the full band returns for the short instrumental break, after which Harrison repeats the choruses, with his singing increasing in emotion.

== Release and reception ==
"The Answer's at the End" was released on 22 September 1975. It was sequenced as the second track on Extra Texture (Read All About It), between "You" and "This Guitar (Can't Keep from Crying)". Some music critics immediately derided the song for its funereal tempo, which was all the more obvious after the upbeat "You". Writing in 1981, author and critic Bob Woffinden paired the song with "This Guitar" as examples of Harrison asking for tolerance from his detractors, and considered that the inclusion of orchestral strings on the album was an attempt to achieve a "commercial bias".

Dave Marsh of Rolling Stone referred to "The Answer's at the End" as "padded subterfuge" which could "easily" have been cut down to two minutes from its length of 5:32. In the NME, Neil Spencer said that, following "You", "hopes of Hari's revival are comprehensively dashed by five-and-a-half minutes of the inordinately dreary 'The Answer's at the End'". Spencer described it as "one of Hari's Homespun Homilies full of crusty chunks of potted wisdom".

In his favourable review for Melody Maker, Ray Coleman wrote that Extra Texture represented "a re-statement of the fundamentals we should all cherish" and that "The Answer's at the End" was Harrison "at his most expressive, vocally", as well as "by far the most majestic track on the album". Coleman also said it was "One of George's most potent tracks ever, highly emotional and introspective" and predicted that its universal theme would encourage several cover recordings.

== Retrospective assessment ==
[On "The Answer's at the End"] the old, bold George is no more. The certainties of "The Lord Loves the One" seem to have dissipated ... The passionate searcher of "Hear Me Lord" sounds defeated, asking for a little "live and let live."

— Author Simon Leng, 2006

Writing 21 years after its release, Alan Clayson dismissed the song as "archaic parlour poetry" on an album full of "long, dull melodies". Simon Leng admires the "warm sonic scenes" of "The Answer's at the End" and recognises it as an "interesting" composition, one that "ponders the nature of relationships" in a similar way to Bob Dylan's 1975 album Blood on the Tracks. Leng pairs the song with another Extra Texture track, "Grey Cloudy Lies", however, as "two slabs of introspection" that suffer from being "part calls for tolerance and part expression of downright despair". (Note: Leng also laments that, in exchanging his "quest for philosophical certainty" with a request for understanding, "The Answer's at the End" appears to present a diluted version of Harrison's message on All Things Must Pass and his 1973 album Living in the Material World.) While similarly noting the bleakness of the subject matter, Ian Inglis opines: "The lack of optimism in his words is matched by a largely inconspicuous melody and an inconsistent production in which alternate piano, strings, and guitar interludes fail to provide a coherent musical context."

Music journalist Rip Rense cites "The Answer's at the End" as an example of how "even the rather hasty" Extra Texture offers "some of the most affecting moments in [Harrison's] career". With reference to the song's second verse, Rense adds: "and how many songwriters have ever sung a line as wonderful as 'The speech of flowers excels the flowers of speech?'" Authors Chip Madinger and Mark Easter recognise the song as a "highlight" of the album, while Elliot Huntley terms it a "gorgeously melodic song of forgiveness". Huntley praises the track's "epic sweep" and writes of the Simone-inspired coda: "This is one of my favourite moments of the entire Harrison back-catalogue, especially when the ensemble returns to see the song through to its conclusion ..."

AllMusic's Richard Ginell describes "The Answer's at the End" as one of Harrison's "most beautifully harmonized, majestic, strangely underrated ballads". Along with "You" and "This Guitar (Can't Keep from Crying)", Ginell rates the song "among the best" from Harrison's solo career. In his book covering the Beatles' first decade as solo artists, Fab Four FAQ 2.0, Robert Rodriguez includes "The Answer's at the End" in a chapter discussing eight overlooked Harrison compositions, and comments that the song's "grace and majesty" is reminiscent of "Isn't It a Pity". In December 2001, Billboard editor-in-chief Timothy White, a longstanding friend of the former Beatle, titled his Harrison obituary "The Answer's at the End". White's piece went on to win an ASCAP-Deems Taylor Award for excellence in music journalism.

Reviewing the 2014 Apple Years reissue of Extra Texture, for The Second Disc, Joe Marchese highlights "the touching 'The Answer's at the End'" among the "top-drawer material" found on the album. In his review for Paste magazine, Robert Ham views the song as a "[moment] when Harrison's focus returns" on Extra Texture and one of the album's ballads that "cut deep".

== Personnel ==
- George Harrison – vocals, 12-string acoustic guitar, electric guitars, slide guitar, backing vocals
- David Foster – piano, string arrangement
- Gary Wright – organ
- Paul Stallworth – bass
- Jim Keltner – drums
- Norm Kinney – tambourine, shaker

== Sources ==
- Dale C. Allison Jr, The Love There That's Sleeping: The Art and Spirituality of George Harrison, Continuum (New York, NY, 2006; ISBN 978-0-8264-1917-0).
- Keith Badman, The Beatles Diary Volume 2: After the Break-Up 1970–2001, Omnibus Press (London, 2001; ISBN 0-7119-8307-0).
- Pattie Boyd with Penny Junor, Wonderful Today: The Autobiography, Headline Review (London, 2007; ISBN 978-0-7553-1646-5).
- Roy Carr & Tony Tyler, The Beatles: An Illustrated Record, Trewin Copplestone Publishing (London, 1978; ISBN 0-450-04170-0).
- Harry Castleman & Walter J. Podrazik, All Together Now: The First Complete Beatles Discography 1961–1975, Ballantine Books (New York, NY, 1976; ISBN 0-345-25680-8).
- Alan Clayson, George Harrison, Sanctuary (London, 2003; ISBN 1-86074-489-3).
- The Editors of Rolling Stone, Harrison, Rolling Stone Press/Simon & Schuster (New York, NY, 2002; ISBN 0-7432-3581-9).
- George Harrison: Living in the Material World DVD, Village Roadshow, 2011 (directed by Martin Scorsese; produced by Olivia Harrison, Nigel Sinclair & Martin Scorsese).
- Joshua M. Greene, Here Comes the Sun: The Spiritual and Musical Journey of George Harrison, John Wiley & Sons (Hoboken, NJ, 2006; ISBN 978-0-470-12780-3).
- George Harrison, I Me Mine, Chronicle Books (San Francisco, CA, 2002; ISBN 0-8118-3793-9).
- Elliot J. Huntley, Mystical One: George Harrison – After the Break-up of the Beatles, Guernica Editions (Toronto, ON, 2006; ISBN 1-55071-197-0).
- Ian Inglis, The Words and Music of George Harrison, Praeger (Santa Barbara, CA, 2010; ISBN 978-0-313-37532-3).
- Simon Leng, While My Guitar Gently Weeps: The Music of George Harrison, Hal Leonard (Milwaukee, WI, 2006; ISBN 1-4234-0609-5).
- Chip Madinger & Mark Easter, Eight Arms to Hold You: The Solo Beatles Compendium, 44.1 Productions (Chesterfield, MO, 2000; ISBN 0-615-11724-4).
- Chris O'Dell with Katherine Ketcham, Miss O'Dell: My Hard Days and Long Nights with The Beatles, The Stones, Bob Dylan, Eric Clapton, and the Women They Loved, Touchstone (New York, NY, 2009; ISBN 978-1-4165-9093-4).
- Robert Rodriguez, Fab Four FAQ 2.0: The Beatles' Solo Years, 1970–1980, Backbeat Books (Milwaukee, WI, 2010; ISBN 978-1-4165-9093-4).
- Nicholas Schaffner, The Beatles Forever, McGraw-Hill (New York, NY, 1978; ISBN 0-07-055087-5).
- Howard Sounes, Fab: An Intimate Life of Paul McCartney, HarperCollins (London, 2010; ISBN 978-0-00-723705-0).
- Bruce Spizer, The Beatles Solo on Apple Records, 498 Productions (New Orleans, LA, 2005; ISBN 0-9662649-5-9).
- Gary Tillery, Working Class Mystic: A Spiritual Biography of George Harrison, Quest Books (Wheaton, IL, 2011; ISBN 978-0-8356-0900-5).
- Bob Woffinden, The Beatles Apart, Proteus (London, 1981; ISBN 0-906071-89-5).
