= Can't Stop Thinking About You =

Song by George Harrison

from the album Extra Texture (Read All About It)
- Released: 22 September 1975
- Genre: Pop, soul
- Length: 4:30
- Label: Apple
- Songwriter(s): George Harrison
- Producer(s): George Harrison

"Can't Stop Thinking About You" is a song by English musician George Harrison, released in 1975 on his final album for Apple Records, Extra Texture (Read All About It). A love song in the style of a soul/R&B ballad, it was written by Harrison in December 1973, towards the end of his marriage to Pattie Boyd and while he was having an affair with Maureen Starkey, the wife of his former Beatles bandmate Ringo Starr. Having first considered the song for his 1974 release Dark Horse, Harrison recorded "Can't Stop Thinking About You" in Los Angeles in May 1975 for his so-called "soul album", Extra Texture. Some authors view its inclusion on the latter release as an obvious attempt by Harrison to commercialise the album, in response to the harsh critical reception afforded Dark Horse and his 1974 North American tour.

The backing musicians on the recording include Nicky Hopkins, Jesse Ed Davis and David Foster, the last of whom also contributed a string arrangement. On release, "Can't Stop Thinking About You" was considered by some music critics to be a highlight of its parent album. In spite of the song's commercial qualities, it was passed over for release as the second single from Extra Texture in favour of "This Guitar (Can't Keep from Crying)". Among opinions in the 21st century, commentators have tended to dismiss the composition as repetitious and inconsequential, with author Simon Leng describing it as "pop-soul fluff".

== Background and composition ==
Although he omits any discussion of the song from his autobiography, I, Me, Mine (1980), George Harrison told interviewers in September 1975 that he wrote "Can't Stop Thinking About You" over Christmas 1973. This period coincided with the end of Harrison's relationship with his first wife, Pattie Boyd, who has described their home, Friar Park, as a "madhouse" during their final year together. In her 2009 memoir, music-industry insider Chris O'Dell recalls spending the 1973 Christmas holiday with the couple and learning that Harrison was having an affair with Maureen Starkey, the wife of his fellow ex-Beatle Ringo Starr. On the night of 23 December, with both wives and O'Dell present, Harrison duly announced to Starr that he was in love with Maureen.

Author Simon Leng pairs the song with "Simply Shady", as being a musical document of Harrison's "many nights spent nursing a bottle of brandy" while his marriage collapsed. Harrison himself termed the 1973–74 period his "naughty" years, signifying bouts of rock-star excess and deviation from his Hindu-aligned spiritual path. A Christian theologian, Dale Allison, views "Can't Stop Thinking About You" as a "typical, mid-seventies pop love song" and finds that it "contains no theology" – unlike many of Harrison's love songs, which appear to be directed at both a woman and a deity.

The lyrics consist mainly of the song title repeated at length, with the words "It's no good living without you" providing the chorus's third line. The two verses are equally "simplistic", Harrison biographer Alan Clayson writes, as Harrison first states that, with the arrival of night-time, "Daylight has left me … / I can't take it if I don't see you no more", before altering the temporal context in verse two to morning, when "The daylight gets to me ..." Author Ian Inglis concludes of the song-wide message in "Can't Stop Thinking About You": "Day or night, Harrison's thoughts never stray from the lover who has left him ..."

Musically, the composition is in the "soul-pop" style, Leng writes, reflecting Harrison's return to the soul music genre over 1974–76, after his earlier projects with Apple Records signings Doris Troy, Billy Preston and Ronnie Spector. (Note: Troy's original mentor was "Godfather of Soul" James Brown, whose interpretation of Harrison's Beatles hit "Something" was its composer's favourite among the hundreds of cover versions of that song.) Author Robert Rodriguez similarly describes it as "an R&B-style weeper". When discussing the song with Paul Gambaccini on BBC Radio 1, in September 1975, Harrison remarked on the "melodramatic" melody over the verses (or "middle bits"), likening it to the extravagant musical styles of Al Jolson and Mario Lanza.

Even though the Harrison–Maureen Starkey liaison had become common knowledge by late 1974 – when Harrison released his album Dark Horse and mounted a North American tour with Ravi Shankar – some critics later interpreted the song as being directed at Boyd, who had left him for his friend Eric Clapton in July that same year. Harrison biographer Elliot Huntley suggests that, by the time Harrison recorded "Can't Stop Thinking About You" in 1975, for Extra Texture (Read All About It), the subject is more likely to have been Olivia Arias. The latter was working as a secretary for Harrison's Dark Horse record label in Los Angeles when they first met, in October 1974, after which she became his constant companion and, later, his wife. (Note: Arias was the inspiration "behind many great Harrisongs to come", Huntley notes, including "Beautiful Girl" and "Dark Sweet Lady".)

== Recording ==
Harrison first recorded "Can't Stop Thinking About You" for Dark Horse, in June 1974, but left the song unfinished. With that album and the accompanying tour having received negative reviews from Rolling Stone and other music publications over the winter of 1974–75, NME critic Bob Woffinden noted an "eagerness" on Harrison's part to "redeem himself" with Extra Texture. Harrison's late 1974 projects had also resulted in a fall from his previous position of "considerable public and commercial favor", according to music journalist Mikal Gilmore. (Note: Rodriguez writes that, until sales for Paul McCartney and Wings' Band on the Run album (1973) took off in April 1974, Harrison had held the unofficial title of "ex-Beatle Most Likely to Succeed". In addition to commercial and critical successes under his own name – such as the albums All Things Must Pass (1970), The Concert for Bangladesh (1971) and Living in the Material World (1973) – Harrison had co-written and/or produced hit songs during this period for Starr ("It Don't Come Easy", "Back Off Boogaloo" and "Photograph") and Badfinger ("Day After Day").) Leng maintains that this loss of prestige influenced Harrison's choosing to include three obviously commercial tracks that were "designed to rehabilitate [his] pop status": the 1971 Ronnie Spector outtake "You"; a tribute to soul singer Smokey Robinson, "Ooh Baby (You Know That I Love You)"; and "Can't Stop Thinking About You".

As another contributing factor behind what Beatles biographers such as Rodriguez, Woffinden and Chris Ingham recognise as an expedient, rushed approach to making Extra Texture, Harrison wished to record the album quickly and so end his commitments to Apple, before signing with A&M-distributed Dark Horse Records. In addition, studio time became available at A&M's recording facility when he was in Los Angeles in April 1975; and, in one of his Dark Horse acts, the band Attitudes, he already had backing musicians on hand. "The haste was almost unseemly", Leng writes of the apparent commercial considerations behind Harrison's 1975 album, such that it would be "the first of his releases to lack passion".

Harrison taped the basic track for "Can't Stop Thinking About You" at A&M Studios in Hollywood on 1 May. One of many piano-based songs on Extra Texture, the recording features three keyboard players – Nicky Hopkins (piano), Attitudes member David Foster (Fender Rhodes electric piano) and Gary Wright (ARP synthesizer). Authors Chip Madinger and Mark Easter suggest that Hopkins may have taped his contribution at a separate session. Harrison and Jesse Ed Davis played electric guitar on the song, while the rhythm section comprised Attitudes drummer Jim Keltner and Harrison's friend Klaus Voormann on bass.

Leng describes the musical arrangement as "[aping] the currently fashionable Philly Soul sound" through the use of "lush strings, pop-gospel chord sequences, and richly worked backup vocals". Harrison later conceded that the song was "very commercial" and stated that he had envisioned it recorded by English singer Joe Cocker, to whom he originally gave "Something" in March 1969. In the same radio interview with Gambaccini, Harrison claimed that with his lead vocal on "Can't Stop Thinking About You", he was attempting to imitate John Lennon, adding: "It was hard to sing that first chorus, I tell you." For the backing vocals, Harrison worked with Paul Stallworth, the lead singer of Attitudes, to create what Leng identifies as his "most intricate" vocal arrangement since producing Splinter's debut album, The Place I Love, over 1973–74. (Note: The inclusion of radio-friendly backing vocals on "Can't Stop Thinking About You" was significant after the scrutiny afforded Harrison's laryngitis-affected singing on Dark Horse and the 1974 tour. In a scathing review of that album for Rolling Stone magazine, Jim Miller had attacked Harrison's limitations as a singer and questioned whether he would "ever again be a competent entertainer".) Foster arranged and conducted a nineteen-piece orchestral string section for the track on 6 June at A&M. Madinger and Easter write that horn overdubs took place on 2–3 June, played by Tom Scott and Chuck Findley, yet only the string orchestration appears on the released recording.

== Release ==
Often viewed as Harrison's "soul album", Extra Texture (Read All About It) was released in September 1975, just nine months after Dark Horse. "Can't Stop Thinking About You" appeared as track 2 on side two of the original LP format, segued with the side-opening "A Bit More of You". Leng writes that the purpose of the latter track, a 45-second instrumental portion of the Motown-inspired "You", was to "fashion a soul mood" for "Can't Stop Thinking About You".

With "You" an obvious choice for the album's lead single, "Can't Stop Thinking About You" had the qualities required to be the follow-up, Leng and Allison opine. Instead, "This Guitar (Can't Keep from Crying)", Harrison's rebuttal to his 1974 critics, was released as a second single from Extra Texture, in December 1975.

== Reception ==
A number of critics singled out the song as a highlight of the album. Dave Marsh of Rolling Stone wrote: "Both 'Can't Stop Thinking About You' and 'Tired of Midnight Blue' ... are well done. Free from dogma ... they provide the most effective nine minutes of music Harrison's made since his solo career began." Ray Coleman of Melody Maker admired Keltner's drumming and the lead vocal part, which he said demonstrated "a texture to George's voice which hasn't often been heard". Coleman said that each of the album's tracks could "stand alone as a single" and identified "Can't Stop Thinking About You" as a "goodie" that improved through repeated listening.

Among more recent reviewers, Paul Du Noyer, writing for Blender magazine in 2004, grouped the song with "You" and "This Guitar" as the three "standout tracks" on Extra Texture. While considering the album to be "almost entirely weary in tone, amounting to a prolonged buzz kill", Robert Rodriguez writes: "Isolated from the morose surroundings on this LP, ['Can't Stop Thinking About You'] could have really shone, but here it simply prolongs the tedium." Chris Ingham pairs the song with "Ooh Baby" as examples of Harrison's "threadbare" compositions on Extra Texture and the "slick playing" found throughout the album.

More impressed, Beatles compiler Bruce Spizer describes "Can't Stop Thinking About You" as a "beautiful mid-tempo love song", while Elliot Huntley admires it as "one of the best songs George ever wrote ... right up there with 'Something'". "It's one of those songs where everything comes together", Huntley continues, before listing attributes such as Nicky Hopkins' "elegant piano" and Harrison's "exquisite" vocals. Reviewing the 2014 reissue of Extra Texture, Joe Marchese of The Second Disc deems it to be a track that "happily reflected his newfound bliss with Olivia". Tom Doyle, writing for Mojo magazine, describes Harrison as "sound[ing] depressed, if R&B-soulful" on Extra Texture, with "Can't Stop Thinking About You" "pre-echoing the boozy laments" of John Martyn's 1980 album Grace and Danger.

Ian Inglis is dismissive of the "repetitive nature" of the lyrics and an "equally repetitive" melody. Noting that "Can't Stop Thinking About You" lacks the compositional strengths that make such repetition an "effective musical device", Inglis concludes: "what might have been intended as a pop anthem only manages to become an inconsequential album track." Simon Leng is similarly negative of Harrison's "aims to please", and writes: "No song on Extra Texture speaks more of the need to be commercially acceptable than 'Can't Stop Thinking About You,' Harrison's most obvious new pop cut since 'Don't Let Me Wait Too Long.' Here he is positively desperate to reach for insignificance ..." Leng describes the track as "pop-soul fluff" and adds: "The song was obviously written to be a single, which makes it doubly puzzling that it wasn't released as one."

== Personnel ==
- George Harrison – vocals, electric guitar, backing vocals
- Nicky Hopkins – piano
- David Foster – electric piano, string arrangement
- Jesse Ed Davis – electric guitar
- Gary Wright – ARP synthesizer
- Klaus Voormann – bass
- Jim Keltner – drums
- uncredited – tambourine
- Paul Stallworth – backing vocals

== Sources ==
- Dale C. Allison Jr., The Love There That's Sleeping: The Art and Spirituality of George Harrison, Continuum (New York, NY, 2006; ISBN 978-0-8264-1917-0).
- Keith Badman, The Beatles Diary Volume 2: After the Break-Up 1970–2001, Omnibus Press (London, 2001; ISBN 0-7119-8307-0).
- Pattie Boyd with Penny Junor, Wonderful Today: The Autobiography, Headline Review (London, 2007; ISBN 978-0-7553-1646-5).
- Harry Castleman & Walter J. Podrazik, All Together Now: The First Complete Beatles Discography 1961–1975, Ballantine Books (New York, NY, 1976; ISBN 0-345-25680-8).
- Alan Clayson, George Harrison, Sanctuary (London, 2003; ISBN 1-86074-489-3).
- The Editors of Rolling Stone, Harrison, Rolling Stone Press/Simon & Schuster (New York, NY, 2002; ISBN 0-7432-3581-9).
- Joshua M. Greene, Here Comes the Sun: The Spiritual and Musical Journey of George Harrison, John Wiley & Sons (Hoboken, NJ, 2006; ISBN 978-0-470-12780-3).
- George Harrison, I Me Mine, Chronicle Books (San Francisco, CA, 2002; ISBN 0-8118-3793-9).
- Elliot J. Huntley, Mystical One: George Harrison – After the Break-up of the Beatles, Guernica Editions (Toronto, ON, 2006; ISBN 1-55071-197-0).
- Chris Ingham, The Rough Guide to the Beatles, Rough Guides/Penguin (London, 2006; 2nd edn; ISBN 978-1-84836-525-4).
- Ian Inglis, The Words and Music of George Harrison, Praeger (Santa Barbara, CA, 2010; ISBN 978-0-313-37532-3).
- Simon Leng, While My Guitar Gently Weeps: The Music of George Harrison, Hal Leonard (Milwaukee, WI, 2006; ISBN 1-4234-0609-5).
- Chip Madinger & Mark Easter, Eight Arms to Hold You: The Solo Beatles Compendium, 44.1 Productions (Chesterfield, MO, 2000; ISBN 0-615-11724-4).
- Chris O'Dell with Katherine Ketcham, Miss O'Dell: My Hard Days and Long Nights with The Beatles, The Stones, Bob Dylan, Eric Clapton, and the Women They Loved, Touchstone (New York, NY, 2009; ISBN 978-1-4165-9093-4).
- Robert Rodriguez, Fab Four FAQ 2.0: The Beatles' Solo Years, 1970–1980, Backbeat Books (Milwaukee, WI, 2010; ISBN 978-1-4165-9093-4).
- Nicholas Schaffner, The Beatles Forever, McGraw-Hill (New York, NY, 1978; ISBN 0-07-055087-5).
- Bruce Spizer, The Beatles Solo on Apple Records, 498 Productions (New Orleans, LA, 2005; ISBN 0-9662649-5-9).
- Gary Tillery, Working Class Mystic: A Spiritual Biography of George Harrison, Quest Books (Wheaton, IL, 2011; ISBN 978-0-8356-0900-5).
- Bob Woffinden, The Beatles Apart, Proteus (London, 1981; ISBN 0-906071-89-5).
