= Frank Crisp =

English lawyer and microscopist

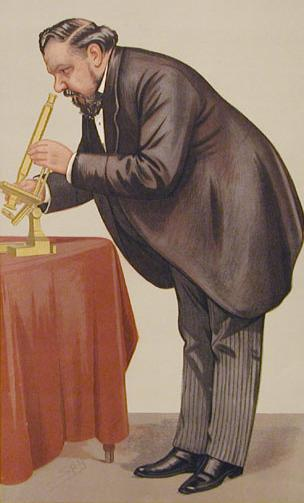
Frank Crisp, by Leslie Ward, 1891.

Sir Frank Crisp, 1st Baronet, (25 October 1843 – 29 April 1919) was an English lawyer, microscopist and officer of the Royal Microscopical Society, to which he donated furniture, books, instruments and work on technical publications.

== Life and death ==
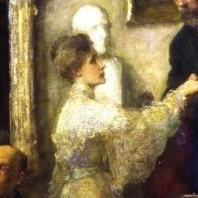
Lady Crisp as central figure in James Sant's painting of the Linnean Society of London First Formal Admission of Women Fellows

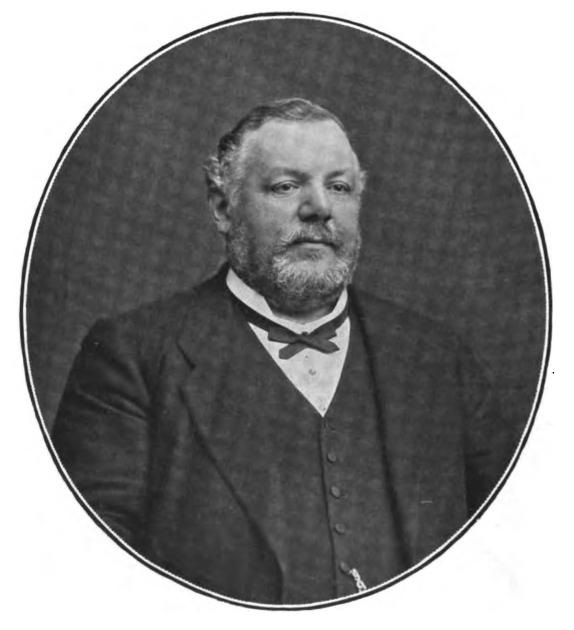
Frank Crisp, c. 1904

Frank Crisp was born on 25 October 1843 in London. His mother died when he was three years old and as a result he was brought up by his grandfather, John Filby Childs. He resolved to take up the law and at 16 was articled to a firm of solicitors. He also studied at the University of London, obtaining the degrees of BA in 1864 and LLB in 1865. In 1867 he married Catherine Howes. From 1881 to 1906, he was a treasurer, and later a vice-president, of the Linnean Society; Catherine Crisp, along with 14 of 15 other women whose names were presented on 17 November 1904, was elected a fellow of the Society, withdrawing in 1916.

Crisp qualified as a solicitor in 1869 and his reputation soon grew, acting in many important commercial contracts. He counted several foreign railroad companies and the Imperial Japanese Navy among his clients, and drew up the contract for the cutting of the Cullinan diamond.

Having been knighted on 16 December 1907, Crisp was created a baronet on 5 February 1913 for services as legal advisor to the Liberal Party.

In 1889, Crisp bought Friar Park in Henley-on-Thames. He was a keen horticulturist and developed spectacular public gardens there, including an alpine garden featuring a 20-foot (6-metre) replica of the Matterhorn. He published an exhaustive survey of medieval gardening titled Mediaeval Gardens. He commissioned Henry Ernest Milner to design the gardens.

Crisp died on 29 April 1919 aged 75.

== Legacy ==
Former Beatle George Harrison purchased Friar Park in January 1970. He wrote a tribute to Crisp called "Ballad of Sir Frankie Crisp (Let It Roll)", which appeared on the album All Things Must Pass and later provided part of the title for his 2009 career-spanning compilation Let It Roll: Songs by George Harrison. In addition, Harrison's 1974 hit single "Ding Dong, Ding Dong" contains the lyrical refrain "Ring out the old, ring in the new / Ring out the false, ring in the true", which was taken from one of a number of inscriptions Crisp had engraved in the house and grounds of the property. (It is actually from Ring Out, Wild Bells, a section of the Tennyson poem In Memoriam A. H. H.) The lyrics and title of another Harrison track, "The Answer's at the End", were also inspired by the writings of Frank Crisp: "Scan not a friend with a microscopic glass / You know his faults, now let his foibles pass / Life is one long enigma, my friend / So read on, read on, the answer's at the end."

Baronetage of the United Kingdom
New title	Baronet (of Bungay); 1913–1919	Succeeded by Frank Morris Crisp
