= Tired of Midnight Blue =

Song by George Harrison

from the album Extra Texture (Read All About It)
- Released: 22 September 1975
- Genre: Rock
- Length: 4:51
- Label: Apple
- Songwriter(s): George Harrison
- Producer(s): George Harrison

"Tired of Midnight Blue" is a song by English musician George Harrison, released on his 1975 album Extra Texture (Read All About It). It was written after a night out with music-industry executives in Los Angeles – an event that Harrison found particularly depressing. The recording includes contributions from Leon Russell, on piano, and Jim Keltner, who plays drums and percussion.

Along with the hit single "You", "Tired of Midnight Blue" is one of the few songs on Extra Texture that has consistently been received with favour by music critics and reviewers. Writing for Classic Rock magazine, Paul Trynka describes it as "a beautifully constructed lament to a tedious night out".

== Background ==
Since the early 1970s, George Harrison regularly spent part of spring and summer each year in Los Angeles, the recognised capital of the music industry worldwide. In 1971, he produced Ravi Shankar's Raga soundtrack album there, as well as recording his and Shankar's Bangladesh benefit singles. In 1973, he worked with Shankar once more, on Shankar Family & Friends, at A&M Studios in Hollywood, before going on to make guest appearances on albums by Ringo Starr (Ringo), Cheech & Chong (Los Cochinos) and Dave Mason (It's Like You Never Left) at Sunset Sound and other studios around town. When visiting him in Malibu in April 1971, Harrison's friend Chris O'Dell had found him lonely and keen to escape the hangers-on associated with the LA rock world, just as Klaus Voormann has noted that installing a state-of-the-art studio at his Friar Park home would allow Harrison to do the same from the London music scene.

The 1973 visit saw Harrison indulging in more traditional rock-star pursuits, the Cheech & Chong session "morally ... a bit shaky", biographer Alan Clayson has suggested, so beginning a period Harrison himself termed as his "naughty" years; Voormann called it a "step back". By March 1975, still "reeling" from the "barbarous reaction" to both his 1974 tour with Shankar and the Dark Horse album, according to musical biographer Simon Leng, Harrison was back in Los Angeles, this time as the head of his own independent record label. Dark Horse Records had recently signed a handful of new acts in Jiva, Stairsteps and Attitudes, all of whom were American-based, a reality that meant Harrison was domiciled in California with girlfriend Olivia Arias all through the summer.

== Composition and recording ==
A much-in-demand session musician, Klaus Voormann recalls of this period in Los Angeles: "It was a terrible time because I think there was a lot of cocaine going around, and that's when I got out of the picture ... I realised that it was the whole Hollywood thing – the problem was that if you wanted to stay in that scene, you had to hang out with those people, and go and do the clubs ... George was in it too far at the time, and it was a good step of his to get out of it." Harrison would later credit his prolonged bout of hepatitis in early 1976 as the reason he quit heavy drinking, but as an industry boss in the spring of 1975, he too found himself in the LA clubs. One such night left him "depressed by what I saw going on there", as he put it in his autobiography, when discussing the song "Tired of Midnight Blue".

Over a "smoky, bluesy" musical backing, the song's first verse and chorus outline his thoughts upon returning home to his lover after the night in question, as a new day is just beginning:

The sun came into view
As I sat with the tears in my eyes
The sun came up on you
And as you smiled, the tear-drop it dried.

I don't know where I had been
But I know what I had seen
Made me chill right to the bone
Made me wish that I'd stayed home – along with you
Tired of midnight blue.

Musically, over the "along with you / Tired of midnight blue" lines of the choruses, the song drops from what author Alan Clayson terms its "'Badge'-style rhythmic lope", propelled by Harrison's strong seventh chords on soul-inflected rhythm guitar and Jim Keltner's drums and cowbell, to reveal sweeping "tumbleweed" piano from Leon Russell and a rare Extra Texture slide-guitar commentary from Harrison.

The second verse then describes the morning progressing, and with it an increased clarity of mind:

The sun came up so high
As it shone, I realised your love
The sun shone in your eyes
And as you smiled, you realised it too.

By the final verse, the sun is setting and the moon now rises. "Way up, the clouds told me that they knew," Harrison sings before recognising the truth reflected in his lover: "And as you smiled, I knew that you knew too."

While discussing the song with BBC Radio 1's Paul Gambaccini that September, Harrison praised Russell's "fantastic" piano contribution after introducing the track with a laconic "You know those nights you go out and wish you hadn't? It's one of those ..." "Tired of Midnight Blue" was recorded on 21 April that year, again at A&M Studios, as "Midnight Blue"; the title was subsequently altered once Melissa Manchester had a hit with a song of that name over the summer.

== Release and reception ==
"Tired of Midnight Blue" was issued on Extra Texture (Read All About It) in September 1975 and was one of the few songs on the album to garner positive reviews. Dave Marsh of Rolling Stone described it as "well done" and "cryptic in the manner of 'Blue Jay Way'". Together with "Can't Stop Thinking About You", it provided, in Marsh's words, "the most effective nine minutes of music Harrison's made since his solo career began. 'Midnight Blue' even features some of the guitar work Harrison so assiduously avoids elsewhere."

While viewing Extra Texture as predominantly "mournful and doom-laden", the NME's Neil Spencer wrote: "'Tired of Midnight Blue' makes more constructive use of Hari finding his heart in his boots. There's a tune, some moderately tricksy chord changes and a refreshing simplicity in sight. The relative sparsity gives Leon Russell the chance to play some charming tumbledown piano, George meshes some crisp rhythm guitar against his own lead; and it works."

More recently, Seattle-based critic Chaz Lipp writes that "The [album's] essential cut is the grooving 'Tired of Midnight Blue.'" In another 2014 review, for Classic Rock magazine, Paul Trynka describes the track as "a beautifully constructed lament to a tedious night out" and includes it among the album's "confessional songs that have worn well".

Although he sees it as one of a number of tunes on Extra Texture that are "almost watered-down flashbacks to The Beatles", Alan Clayson opines: "In its contradiction of enjoyable depression, only 'Tired of Midnight Blue' passed muster." On an album containing songs that he views as either "threadbare" or "medium-grade self-pastiche", author Chris Ingham writes that "[t]hings look up during Tired of Midnight Blue, a sassy soft-shoe shuffle ... [and] on His Name Is Legs (Ladies and Gentlemen)." In his overview of Harrison's first decade as a solo artist, David Cavanagh of Uncut admires the song as "this LP's 'Beware of Darkness' – i.e. where did he get those chords?"

Simon Leng identifies "Tired of Midnight Blue" as the "only piece that really worked from every angle" and, aside from the album's lead single, "You", "the best song on Extra Texture". Leng describes it as "an introvert's rejection of the 'rock'n'roll' life" and the "reaction" to Dark Horse's "tale of booze and birds" that was "Simply Shady". Pointing to the way ahead in Harrison's career, Leng continues, "['Tired of Midnight Blue'] summarises George's intention to head back to his English garden and the comfort of family life."

== Personnel ==
- George Harrison – vocals, electric guitar, slide guitars, backing vocals
- Leon Russell – piano
- Paul Stallworth – bass
- Jim Keltner – drums, cowbell, handclaps

== Sources ==
- Dale C. Allison Jr., The Love There That's Sleeping: The Art and Spirituality of George Harrison, Continuum (New York, NY, 2006; ISBN 978-0-8264-1917-0).
- Keith Badman, The Beatles Diary Volume 2: After the Break-Up 1970–2001, Omnibus Press (London, 2001; ISBN 0-7119-8307-0).
- Harry Castleman & Walter J. Podrazik, All Together Now: The First Complete Beatles Discography 1961–1975, Ballantine Books (New York, NY, 1976; ISBN 0-345-25680-8).
- Alan Clayson, George Harrison, Sanctuary (London, 2003; ISBN 1-86074-489-3).
- The Editors of Rolling Stone, Harrison, Rolling Stone Press/Simon & Schuster (New York, NY, 2002; ISBN 0-7432-3581-9).
- George Harrison, I Me Mine, Chronicle Books (San Francisco, CA, 2002; ISBN 0-8118-3793-9).
- Elliot J. Huntley, Mystical One: George Harrison – After the Break-up of the Beatles, Guernica Editions (Toronto, ON, 2006; ISBN 1-55071-197-0).
- Chris Ingham, The Rough Guide to the Beatles, Rough Guides/Penguin (London, 2006; 2nd edn; ISBN 978-1-84836-525-4).
- Ian Inglis, The Words and Music of George Harrison, Praeger (Santa Barbara, CA, 2010; ISBN 978-0-313-37532-3).
- Simon Leng, While My Guitar Gently Weeps: The Music of George Harrison, Hal Leonard (Milwaukee, WI, 2006; ISBN 1-4234-0609-5).
- Chip Madinger & Mark Easter, Eight Arms to Hold You: The Solo Beatles Compendium, 44.1 Productions (Chesterfield, MO, 2000; ISBN 0-615-11724-4).
- Chris O'Dell with Katherine Ketcham, Miss O'Dell: My Hard Days and Long Nights with The Beatles, The Stones, Bob Dylan, Eric Clapton, and the Women They Loved, Touchstone (New York, NY, 2009; ISBN 978-1-4165-9093-4).
- Robert Rodriguez, Fab Four FAQ 2.0: The Beatles' Solo Years, 1970–1980, Backbeat Books (Milwaukee, WI, 2010; ISBN 978-1-4165-9093-4).
- Howard Sounes, Fab: An Intimate Life of Paul McCartney, HarperCollins (London, 2010; ISBN 978-0-00-723705-0).
- Bruce Spizer, The Beatles Solo on Apple Records, 498 Productions (New Orleans, LA, 2005; ISBN 0-9662649-5-9).
- Gary Tillery, Working Class Mystic: A Spiritual Biography of George Harrison, Quest Books (Wheaton, IL, 2011; ISBN 978-0-8356-0900-5).
