= Paul Trynka =

British rock journalist and author

Paul Trynka is a British rock journalist and author. He was the editor of the music magazine Mojo from 1999 to 2003, and has also worked as editorial director of Q and editor of International Musician. In 2004, he edited publisher Dorling Kindersley's compilation of the Mojo Special Limited Edition issues on the Beatles. He has also written for The Independent and Classic Rock magazine, and contributed articles on music, fashion, design or travel for The Guardian, Elle and Blueprint, among other publications. Before turning to journalism, he worked as a professional musician with the band Nyam Nyam, recording albums for the Beggars Banquet and Factory Benelux record labels.

He now works as a physics teacher in Thomas Tallis School in Kidbrooke, South East London.

== Books ==
Trynka has written or co-written the books Electric Guitar (1993), Portrait of the Blues (1996) and Denim (2001). In 2005, Trynka published Iggy Pop: Open Up and Bleed, a biography of Iggy Pop. A review in The Guardian describes the book as "piecing together the chaotic life story of this often unhinged performer in thorough and scrupulously non-judgmental detail". In 2011, he published Starman: David Bowie, a biography of English musician David Bowie. Writing in The New York Times, Dwight Garner described it as "a better-than-average rock biography, but just barely".

Trynka wrote Sympathy for the Devil: The Birth of the Rolling Stones and the Death of Brian Jones, a 2014 biography of Rolling Stones guitarist Brian Jones. The book was published in the United States as Brian Jones: The Making of the Rolling Stones. In his review for The New York Times, Larry Rohter said the book "challenges the standard version of events" by recognising Jones' importance on a par with Mick Jagger and Keith Richards, and added: "Though Mr. Trynka sometimes overstates Jones’s long-term cultural impact, his is revisionist history of the best kind – scrupulously researched and cogently argued – and should be unfailingly interesting to any Stones fan."
