= Ray Coleman =

20th century British journalist and writer

- Born: 15 June 1937; Leicester, England
- Died: 10 September 1996 (aged 59); Shepperton, England
- Occupations: Author; Editor in chief, Melody Maker; Biographer; Journalist

Ray Coleman (15 June 1937, Leicester – 10 September 1996, Shepperton) was a British author and music journalist.

== Career ==
Coleman was the former editor-in-chief of Melody Maker known for his biographies of The Beatles. Besides Melody Maker, Coleman contributed to music magazines such as Disc, Black Music, and Musicians Only, and a contributor to magazines such as Billboard. An author or co-author of ten books, he was working with Nicky Hopkins on a never-completed biography at the time of Hopkins' death in 1994. Coleman was also near the completion of a Phil Collins biography at the time of his own death in 1996. The book was completed and published in 1997.

Coleman was the first journalist to be awarded a Gold Badge of Merit by the British Academy of Songwriters, Composers and Authors for services to British music.

Ray Coleman died of kidney cancer on 10 September 1996 at his home in Shepperton, near London. He was 59.

== Coleman as biographer ==
Coleman wrote or co-wrote the biographies of at least a dozen famous musicians. They include the following:

- Gary Numan: The Authorised Biography (1982)
- Lennon: The Definitive Biography (1985, updated 1993)
- McCartney: Yesterday and Today
- The Carpenters: The Untold Story
- Clapton: The Authorised Biography of Eric Clapton
- Frank Sinatra: A Celebration
- Stone Alone: The Definitive Story of the Rolling Stones (co-written with Bill Wyman)
- Brian Epstein: The Man Who Made The Beatles
- Rod Stewart: The Biography
- I'll Never Walk Alone (co-written with Gerry Marsden)
- Phil Collins: The Definitive Biography

Media offices
| Preceded by Jack Hutton | Editor of Melody Maker; 1970–1978 | Succeeded by Richard Williams |
