= Dale Allison =

American historian of Early Christianity and Christian theologian

- Born: November 25, 1955 (age 70); Wichita, Kansas, U.S.
- Occupations: New Testament scholar, historian of Early Christianity, and Christian theologian
- Title: Richard J. Dearborn Professor of New Testament Studies at Princeton Theological Seminary

Academic background
- Education: Wichita State University; Duke University (MA, PhD)
- Thesis: The End of the Ages Has Come: an early interpretation of the Passion and Resurrection of Jesus (1982)
- Doctoral advisor: W. D. Davies

Academic work
- Discipline: Biblical studies
- Sub-discipline: New Testament studies

Dale C. Allison Jr. (born November 25, 1955) is an American New Testament scholar and historian of early Christianity. His areas of expertise include the historical Jesus, the Gospel of Matthew, Second Temple Jewish literature, and the history of the interpretation and reception of the Bible.

Since 2013, Allison has been the Richard J. Dearborn Professor of New Testament at Princeton Theological Seminary. He was previously the Erret M. Grable Professor of New Testament at Pittsburgh Theological Seminary (1997–2013). From 2001 to 2014, he was an editor for the multi-volume Encyclopedia of the Bible and Its Reception.

== Life, education, and career ==
Dale Allison was born and raised in Wichita, Kansas. He attended Wichita State University as an undergraduate. He graduated summa cum laude with honors with majors in both philosophy and religion. He subsequently received both an MA and PhD in religion from Duke University, where he studied with W. D. Davies. Before taking his post in Pittsburgh, he was a research associate at Texas Christian University, a research scholar at Saint Paul School of Theology, and a research fellow at Friends University. He has further served as the Alexander Robertson Lecturer at the University of Glasgow (1996), the Hooker Distinguished Visiting professor at McMaster University (2003), Extraordinary Professor and Research Collaborator at North-West University in Potchefstroom, South Africa (2014–2017), and Visiting Griset Chair in Bible and Christian Tradition at Chapman University (2019).

== Works ==
Allison has been called "North America's most complete New Testament scholar" (Scot McKnight) as well as "the premier Matthew specialist of his generation in the United States" (Benedict Viviano). His three-volume commentary on the First Gospel (1988–97), co-authored with W. D. Davies, has been characterized as likely representing "the single most influential commentary on Matthew since the time of the church fathers" (Anders Runesson and Daniel M. Gurtner).

The commentary consistently interprets Matthew within a Jewish framework. That approach was continued in his monograph, The New Moses: A Matthean Typology (1993), which explored Matthew's Moses typology through comparison with other Moses typologies in antiquity. His later work, Studies in Matthew (2005), argued at length that various themes and critical issues in Matthew are much illuminated by serious engagement with the history of reception.

His first book on Jesus, Jesus of Nazareth: Millenarian Prophet (1998), offered criticism of prominent members of the Jesus Seminar, presented a thoroughly eschatological Jesus in the tradition of Albert Schweitzer, highlighted cross-cultural millenarian parallels, and emphasized ascetical elements in the tradition.

Allison returned to the subject of eschatology in Constructing Jesus: Memory, Imagination, and History (2010), which the Biblical Archaeological Society selected as "Best Book Relating to the New Testament" for 2009–2010. But the volume has become best known for its arguments about memory and method. Some have thought Allison too skeptical about human memory. While Rodriguez credits Allison for recognizing the Synoptics' accurate representations of the historical Jesus, he finds the latter's view on memory to be "sober to the point of melancholy", noting that memory is stable enough to authentically represent the past in the present, while Kirk has questioned memory distortion research used by Allison. Many, however, have thought him right about the problems with the traditional criteria of authenticity and about the need to explore alternative methods. The book is significant for its contention that "we should hold a funeral for the view that Jesus entertained no exalted thoughts about himself."

Allison has contributed to the discussion regarding the origin of belief in Jesus' resurrection. In Resurrecting Jesus (2005), he emphasized what he saw as the equivocal nature of the evidence and explored at length many issues surrounding the nature of visions. Later, in The Resurrection of Jesus (2021), he expanded on these topics, responded to critics, and argued for the relevance of adding comparative materials such as Buddhist traditions about the Rainbow body.

Allison has published an anthology of essays on the historical Jesus in Interpreting Jesus concerning contingent eschatology, typology, miracles, women, memory, and the methodology of Jesus research.

In addition to his exegetical works on Matthew, Allison has written a historical-critical commentary on the Epistle of James. He regards the book as a pseudepigraphon and dates it to the early second century. Allison interprets James within a Jewish framework. The volume is notable for its constant use of reception history and the attempt to blur the lines between modern historical-critical exegetes and earlier commentators.

Allison has also written commentaries on two Greek Jewish Pseudepigrapha, the Testament of Abraham (2003) and 4 Baruch (2019). He regards both as originally Jewish compositions but argues that they have been altered more by later Christian hands than most scholars have thought.

Allison has written several books aimed at readers outside the academic guild, attempting to bridge academic research and add broader existential and philosophical questions. The Sermon on the Mount (1999) seeks to clarify the ethical teaching attributed to Jesus in Matthew 5–7. The Luminous Dusk (2006) is a Pascalian exploration of the sources of spiritual experience and how they have been affected by recent cultural and technological changes. The Love There That's Sleeping (2006) surveys the musical corpus of George Harrison in the light of his biography and religious convictions. The Historical Christ and the Theological Jesus (2009) presents Allison's reflections on the theological meaning of the modern quest for the historical Jesus. Night Comes (2016) is a series of meditations on death and what might lie beyond. Encountering Mystery (2022) is a survey and interpretation of religious experiences in the contemporary world.

== Research ==
Three features characterize Allison's work as a whole. First, his studies of early Christian sources consistently understand them above all within their Jewish environment. This entails, as in his work on Moses in Matthew, constant comparison with Jewish writings from the Hebrew Bible, Second Temple Judaism, and the rabbinic corpus. Second, he stresses the importance of the history of interpretation for understanding biblical texts. He insists not only that such history raises awareness of how cultural prejudices and confessional stances affect interpreters but sometimes helps to recover older readings that, while forgotten, nonetheless merit serious consideration. even when judged by modern historical-critical standards.

Finally, Allison's writings are throughout marked by comparativism, whether it is Jesus and cross-cultural messianism, the resurrection appearances and modern visionary experiences, or Jesus' miracles and remarkable stories outside the biblical tradition. Despite all the difficulties, Allison believes that the comparative study of religious phenomena across culture and traditions is an imperative.

== Recognition ==
In 2008, Allison delivered the Kenneth W. Clark Lectures at Duke Divinity School.

In 2014, Allison delivered the Stone Lectures at Princeton Theological Seminary.

In 2023, Allison delivered the Kent Shaffer Lectures at Yale Divinity School.

Allison is a member of the American Academy of Science and Letters.

== Selected Bibliography ==
• Allison, D. C. Jr. (1985). End of the ages has come. Mercer University Press.

• Allison, D. C. Jr. (1991). Jesus of Nazareth: Millenarian prophet. Fortress Press.

• Allison, D. C. Jr. (1993). The new Moses: A Matthean typology. Fortress Press.

• Allison, D. C. Jr. (1999). The Sermon on the Mount: Inspiring the moral imagination. Crossroad.

• Allison, D. C. Jr. (2005). Resurrecting Jesus: The earliest Christian tradition and its interpreters. T&T Clark.

• Allison, D. C. Jr. (2005). Studies in Matthew: Interpretation past and present. Baker Academic.

• Allison, D. C. Jr. (2006). The luminous dusk: Finding God in the deep, still places. Eerdman

• Allison, D. C. Jr. (2006). In A.-J. Levine, D. C. Allison Jr., & J. D. Crossan (Eds.), The historical Jesus in context. Princeton University Press.

• Allison, D. C. Jr. (2006). The love there that's sleeping: The art and spirituality of George Harrison. Continuum.

• Allison, D. C. Jr. (2009). The historical Christ and the theological Jesus. Eerdmans.

• Allison, D. C. Jr. (2010). Constructing Jesus: Memory, imagination, and history. Baker Academic.

• Allison, D. C. Jr. (2013). James (ICC): A critical and exegetical commentary. T&T Clark.

• Allison, D. C. Jr. (2016). Night comes: Death, imagination, and the last things. Eerdmans.

• Allison, D. C. Jr. (2020). The resurrection of Jesus: Apologetics, polemics, history. T&T Clark.

• Allison, D. C. Jr. (2022). Encountering mystery: Religious experience in a secular age. Eerdmans.

• Davies, W. D., & Allison, D. C. Jr. (1988–1997). A Critical and Exegetical Commentary on the Gospel according to Saint Matthew (Vol. 1-3). T & T Clark.
