= Attitudes (band) =

American rock band

Attitudes was a rock band from Los Angeles consisting of keyboardist David Foster, guitarist Danny Kortchmar, bassist Paul Stallworth and drummer Jim Keltner. Its band members came together while working as session musicians on George Harrison's album Extra Texture (Read All About It). They then recorded for Harrison's Dark Horse record label. The band's 1976 single "Sweet Summer Music" reached number 94 on the Billboard Hot 100. James Taylor's recording of their single "Honey Don't Leave L.A." peaked at number 61 on the Billboard Hot 100 in 1978.

== Band members ==
- David Foster – keyboards
- Jim Keltner – drums, percussion
- Danny (Kootch) Kortchmar – guitar, lead and background vocals
- Paul Stallworth – bass, lead and background vocals

== Discography ==
=== Albums ===
- 1976: Attitudes (UK AMLH 22008) (USA SP22008) (Japan KING GP-289)
- 1977: Good News (UK K 56385) (USA DH 3021) (Japan WARNER P-10386D)

=== Singles ===
- 1975: "Ain't Love Enough" / "The Whole World's Crazy" (UK AMS 5504) (USA DH 10004)
- 1976: "Honey Don't Leave L.A." / "Lend a Hand" (USA DH 10008)
- 1976: "Sweet Summer Music" / "If We Want To" (UK AMS 5508) (USA DH 10011)
- 1977: "Sweet Summer Music" / "Being Here with You" (USA DRC 8404)
- 1977: "In a Stranger's Arms" / "Good News" (USA DRC 8452)

=== Album details ===
==== Attitudes ====
All songs produced by Lee Kiefer and Attitudes.

Track listing
Side 1

1. "Ain't Love Enough" (David Foster, Brenda Gordon Russell, Brian Russell)
2. "Street Scene" (Danny Kortchmar)
3. "A Moment" (Foster, Jim Keltner, Kortchmar, Paul Stallworth)
4. "You and I Are So in Love" (B.J. Cook, Eric Mercury)
5. "Squank" (Foster, Keltner, Kortchmar, Stallworth)

Side 2

6. "Lend a Hand" (Stallworth)
7. "Chump Change Romeo" (Kortchmar)
8. "First Ballad" (Foster, Keltner, Kortchmar, Stallworth)
9. "Honey Don't Leave L.A." (Kortchmar)
10. "In the Flow of Love" (Gilbert Bottiglier, Chuck Higgins Jr., Stallworth)

Personnel
Additional musicians

- Jesse Ed Davis – guitar
- Chuck Higgins – vocals
- Vince Charles – percussion, timbales
- Vanette Cloud – background vocals
- Cosmo DeAguero – conductor, congas
- Lee Kiefer – producer, engineer
- Pat Murphy – conductor
- Carmen Twillie – vocals, background vocals
- Fabio Nicoli – art direction
- Kathryn Collier – background vocals

==== Good News ====
Produced by Jay Lewis and Attitudes.

Track listing
Side 1

1. "Being Here with You" (Foster, Keltner, Kortchmar, Stallworth)
2. "Drink My Water" (B. G. Russell, B. Russell)
3. "Sweet Summer Music" (Bottiglier, Higgins Jr., Stallworth)
4. "Let's Talk Turkey" (Kortchmar)
5. "Foster's Frees" (Foster)
6. "Turning in Space" (Brown, Higgins Jr., Stallworth)

Side 2

7. "Change" (Stallworth)
8. "In a Stranger's Arms" (Kortchmar)
9. "Manual Dexterity" (Kortchmar)
10. "Promise Me the Moon" (Kortchmar)
11. "Good News" (Stallworth)

Personnel
Additional musicians

- Ringo Starr – drums (on "Good News")
- Tower of Power – horns
- Jorge Calderón – lead and background vocals
- Chuck Higgins – lead vocals
- George Bell – flute
- Marvin Braxton – harmonica
- Vince Charles – percussion, timbales
- Donny Gerrard – lead and background vocals
- Jay Graydon – guitar
- Jimmie Haskell – string arrangements
- Booker T. Jones – organ, keyboards
- Jay Lewis – guitar
- Pat Murphy – percussion, conductor, conga
- Keith Olsen – engineer
- Yvonne Rankin – lead and background vocals
- Emil Richards – percussion
- Waddy Wachtel – guitar
- Greg Adams – horn arrangements
