= Cloud 9 (George Harrison song) =

- Cover to promotional single release

Promotional single by George Harrison

from the album Cloud Nine
- Released: 2 November 1987
- Recorded: 1987
- Genre: Rock
- Length: 3:15
- Label: Dark Horse
- Songwriter: George Harrison
- Producers: Jeff Lynne, George Harrison

"Cloud 9" is a song by the English rock musician George Harrison, released as the opening track on his 1987 album Cloud Nine. It was also issued as a promotional single in the United States, where it peaked at number 9 on Billboard's Album Rock Tracks chart. Co-produced by Jeff Lynne, the recording features guitar interplay between Harrison, on slide guitar, and Eric Clapton. Harrison performed the song in concert throughout his 1991 Japanese tour with Clapton and again in 1992. A live version appears on Harrison's Live in Japan album, while the original studio recording was included on his 1989 compilation Best of Dark Horse.

== Lyrics and music ==
Disillusioned by the music industry and contemporary musical trends, George Harrison spent the four years following the release of his 1982 album Gone Troppo engaged in film production with his company HandMade and enjoying leisure pursuits such as travel. After completing the soundtrack to the HandMade production Shanghai Surprise, he started work on a new album, with co-producer Jeff Lynne, in January 1987. "Cloud 9" was the first song Harrison wrote for the album, originating as far back as the winter of 1983–84. Although the album was titled Cloud Nine, Harrison decided to use the numeric "9" in the song's title to avoid confusion with the Tempations' 1968 hit song "Cloud Nine".

Music lecturer Ian Inglis described the theme of the song as "a declaration of altruistic love and a promise of a blissful future". Harrison offers his love, time, heart and more to the listener, but allowing her to leave at any time. The singer acknowledges that the listener may "make it all on your own". In Harrison's description, the song "is about everybody looking for something good", and he added: "If there's any love around, you can have it, but if there's any bad about, well, I'll keep that bit from you …"

The music of "Cloud 9" is similar to the blues. Harrison biographer Elliot J. Huntley describes it as having a "J. J. Cale meets the East" atmosphere. Simon Leng, writing in his book While My Guitar Gently Weeps, describes the music as "harmonically simple" and propelled by a "pounding rock beat". Leng identifies the song's raison d'être as the interaction between Harrison's slide guitar and Eric Clapton's "thick-toned Stratocaster". He describes this interplay as representing a "mature conclusion" in the guitarists' long musical relationship, and a performance that "speaks of empathy, not gun-slinging competitiveness". Inglis also praised the interaction between the two guitarists, as well as Jim Horn's saxophone playing. Leng described the saxophone parts on "Cloud 9" as reminiscent of that on Harrison's Beatles song "Savoy Truffle". Both Inglis and Leng noted that Harrison's voice is deeper on "Cloud 9" than it had been in the past, and Inglis credited this for enhancing the maturity of the song's message.

Inglis credited Lynne for not embellishing the song with extravagant overdubs as he used for his ELO songs. Leng noted that Lynne emphasised the basic rock rhythm by incorporating the bass drum and bass guitar high in the mix.

== Release and reception ==
Cloud Nine was released on Harrison's Dark Horse record label on 2 November 1987, with the title song sequenced as the opening track. "Cloud 9" was issued as a promotional single in the United States in early 1988. It reached number 9 on the Billboard Album Rock Tracks chart. In a contemporary review for Rolling Stone, David Wild described the album as an "expertly crafted, endlessly infectious record" and said that the title track was "a surprisingly hard-edged midtempo rocker that features some tastily restrained riffing from Harrison and Eric Clapton". David Wagner of the Santa Cruz Sentinel paired it with "Devil's Radio" from the same album as perhaps "some of the best two-guitar rock ever recorded". AllMusic critic Stephen Thomas Erlewine views it as one of the "best moments" on Cloud Nine.

Harrison described "Cloud 9" as a "good opener" and "the kind of song that is not expected of me". According to Huntley, Harrison underestimated the track; Huntley calls it a "great opener". In Leng's opinion, the song is an "exercise in blandness", containing many "hallmarks of stadium rock nothingness" and lyrics that are "nonthreatening" and "meaningless". While admiring the guitar work, however, he remarks that Harrison's "personality" is still evident, despite the generic 1980s production, and acknowledges that, after his five-year absence, "'Cloud 9' gave notice that George Harrison was back as a force to be reckoned with." Harrison biographer Graeme Thomson was also unimpressed, stating that it sounded like Harrison's personality had been "surgically removed", calling the song "a generic piece of throbbing minor-key blues-rock which would have sounded equally at home on an album by Eric Clapton … or Gary Moore".

"Cloud 9" was included on Harrison's 1989 compilation album Best of Dark Horse 1976–1989. Harrison played it in live performances in 1991 and 1992, including his final full live concert at Royal Albert Hall in England on 6 April 1992. A live performance recorded during Harrison's 1991 Japanese tour with Clapton was included on the live album Live in Japan. According to Inglis, the call and response vocals between Harrison and backing vocalists give this version a "more soulful feel" than the version on Cloud Nine.

== Personnel ==
- George Harrison – lead and backing vocals, guitars, slide guitar
- Jeff Lynne – bass guitar
- Elton John – Fender Rhodes
- Jim Keltner – drums
- Eric Clapton – lead guitar
- Jim Horn – baritone saxophones
- Ray Cooper – percussion
