= Live in Japan (George Harrison album) =

Live album by George Harrison with Eric Clapton and Band
- Released: 13 July 1992
- Recorded: 1–17 December 1991
- Genre: Rock
- Length: 87:16
- Label: Dark Horse
- Producer: Spike and Nelson Wilbury

George Harrison chronology
Best of Dark Horse; 1976–1989 (1989)	Live in Japan (1992)	Brainwashed (2002)

Eric Clapton chronology
Journeyman (1989)	Live in Japan (1992)	Unplugged (1992)

Live in Japan is a live double album by the English musician George Harrison, released in July 1992. Credited to "George Harrison with Eric Clapton and Band", it was Harrison's second official live album release, after 1971's Grammy-winning The Concert for Bangladesh. The album was recorded during his Japanese tour backed by Eric Clapton in December 1991, and it contains live versions of Harrison's work as a solo artist alongside many of his best-known Beatles songs. Aside from the 2001 reissue of All Things Must Pass, with previously unavailable bonus tracks, Live in Japan was Harrison's last release before his death in November 2001.

== History ==
In 1991, a year after releasing the second Traveling Wilburys album, Traveling Wilburys Vol. 3, Harrison was persuaded by close friend Eric Clapton to tour Japan with him. Although mindful of his troubled 1974 North American tour for Dark Horse, Harrison performed a series of well-received shows in December 1991, which also featured a short set of Clapton's songs. The experience proved to be an enjoyable one for Harrison, whose set list included a variety of his Beatles-era songs alongside selections from his solo career. It would end up being his final tour before his death, though he had more tours planned.

== Release ==
A double album, Live in Japan was issued in July 1992, with production credited to "Spike and Nelson Wilbury", Harrison's two personæ on the Traveling Wilburys releases. The live album failed to chart in the United Kingdom and debuted on the Billboard 200 at number 126, its peak position in the United States. The album reached number 15 on Japan's Oricon chart.

It was out of print for many years afterwards until 2004, when Live in Japan was remastered and reissued, both separately and as part of the deluxe box set The Dark Horse Years 1976–1992, on Dark Horse with new distribution by EMI. The release offered a bonus SACD 5.1 surround sound remix alongside the original.

This album was also released as a 2LP vinyl record set in 1992, in 2017, and in 2026.

== Critical reception ==
Professional ratings
Review scores
Source	Rating
AllMusic	3.5/5 stars
Billboard	"Spotlight"
Entertainment Weekly	D
Los Angeles Times	2/4 stars
The Music Box	3/5 stars
MusicHound	4/5 stars
Q	3/5 stars
Rolling Stone	4/5 stars
Uncut	3/5 stars

Billboard magazine described Live in Japan as "a skin-tinglin' romp, delicious and indispensable" in which "several renditions surpass the originals". The reviewer praised Clapton's playing and found Harrison's singing "splendidly nuanced throughout" before concluding: "A portable, utterly fab house party; just add plenty of room to dance." Conversely, Billy Altman wrote in Entertainment Weekly: "you'd need a case of Coke to crack the crust on Harrison, who sounds so woefully out of shape (he's continually either short of breath or struggling instrumentally to keep the tempo) that it's a wonder no medical advisers are listed in the credits … The lone shining moment belongs to Clapton, whose solo on 'While My Guitar Gently Weeps' is perhaps even more spectacular than the one he played on the original …"

In a review for Rolling Stone in which he considered Harrison's live album in the context of other Beatles-related releases, 22 years after the band's break-up, Parke Puterbaugh wrote: "by and large this is a rocking, extroverted performance, and that is where Clapton and band, providing a solid foundation, helped firm up Harrison's repertoire and resolve. From the sprung rhythms and tart slide licks of 'Old Brown Shoe' to the crunching satire of 'Devil's Radio,' it is a pleasure to hear a pair of past masters bring out the best in each other."

Writing for MusicHound, Roger Catlin views Live in Japan as "a remarkable live set, featuring Harrison … playing a repertoire that blends the best of his Beatles writing with his solo material". AllMusic editor Stephen Thomas Erlewine describes the album as a "fine double-disc set" on which Harrison "turns in surprisingly strong versions of his best solo material". Erlewine adds: "it easily surpasses Paul McCartney's double-disc Tripping the Live Fantastic or Paul Is Live. Not bad for a guy who doesn't like to give concerts."

== Track listing ==
All songs by George Harrison, except where noted.

Disc one
No.	Title	Writer(s)	Length
1.	"I Want to Tell You"		4:33
2.	"Old Brown Shoe"		3:51
3.	"Taxman"		4:16
4.	"Give Me Love (Give Me Peace on Earth)"		3:37
5.	"If I Needed Someone"		3:50
6.	"Something"		5:21
7.	"What Is Life"		4:47
8.	"Dark Horse"		4:20
9.	"Piggies"		2:56
10.	"Got My Mind Set on You"	Rudy Clark	4:56

Disc two
No.	Title	Writer(s)	Length
1.	"Cloud 9"		4:23
2.	"Here Comes the Sun"		3:31
3.	"My Sweet Lord"		5:42
4.	"All Those Years Ago"		4:26
5.	"Cheer Down"	Harrison; Tom Petty	3:53
6.	"Devil's Radio"		4:25
7.	"Isn't It a Pity"		6:33
8.	"While My Guitar Gently Weeps"		7:09
9.	"Roll Over Beethoven"	Chuck Berry	4:45

The vinyl 2-LP releases of this album have disc one tracks 1-5 on side one, disc one tracks 6-10 on side two, disc two tracks 1-5 on side three, and disc two tracks 6-9 on side four.

== Personnel ==
- George Harrison – rhythm, lead and slide guitars, acoustic guitar, lead vocals
- Eric Clapton – lead guitar, acoustic guitar, backing vocals
- Andy Fairweather Low – guitar, backing vocals
- Nathan East – bass, backing vocals
- Chuck Leavell – piano, Hammond organ, keyboards, backing vocals
- Greg Phillinganes – keyboards, backing vocals
- Steve Ferrone – drums
- Ray Cooper – percussion, drums
- Katie Kissoon – background vocals
- Tessa Niles – background vocals

== Charts ==
Chart (1992)	Peak position
Japanese Oricon Weekly Albums Chart	15
US Billboard 200	126

== Sales ==
Country	Provider	Sales
Japan	Oricon	34,000+
