= Dark Horse (George Harrison song) =

1974 song by George Harrison

- US picture sleeve

Single by George Harrison

from the album Dark Horse
- B-side: "I Don't Care Anymore" (US); "Hari's on Tour (Express)" (UK)
- Released: 18 November 1974 (US); 28 February 1975 (UK)
- Genre: Rock
- Length: 3:54
- Label: Apple
- Songwriter: George Harrison
- Producer: George Harrison

George Harrison singles chronology
"Give Me Love (Give Me Peace on Earth)" (1973)	"Dark Horse" (1974)	"Ding Dong, Ding Dong" (1974)

Music video
- "Dark Horse" on YouTube

"Dark Horse" is a song by English rock musician George Harrison and the title track to his 1974 solo album on Apple Records. The song was the album's lead single in North America, becoming a top-20 hit in the United States, but it was Harrison's first single not to chart in Britain when issued there in February 1975. The term "dark horse" had long been applied to Harrison due to his unexpected emergence as the most accomplished solo artist of the four former Beatles following the band's break-up in 1970. In the song, however, he said he used the phrase in reference to gossip about someone who carries out clandestine sexual relationships. Commentators interpret the lyrics as a rebuttal to several possible detractors: Harrison's first wife, Pattie Boyd; reviewers who criticised the spiritual content of his 1973 album Living in the Material World; and his former bandmates John Lennon and Paul McCartney. Harrison named his Dark Horse record label after the song, and his 1974 North American tour with Ravi Shankar came to be known as the Dark Horse Tour.

Harrison taped an early version of "Dark Horse" in November 1973, intending to finish this recording for the album. The officially released version was recorded live on a sound stage in Los Angeles during rehearsals for his 1974 concerts, at a time when Harrison's exhaustion through overwork contributed to him contracting laryngitis and losing his voice. His hoarse singing similarly marred the ensuing tour – the first in the US by a member of the Beatles since 1966 – leading to a critical backlash that was reflected in contemporaneous reviews of Dark Horse. Some music critics have since recognised the song as one of Harrison's best post-Beatles compositions and believe that the single would have achieved greater success with a cleaner vocal performance. The recording features a musical arrangement incorporating aspects of folk and jazz, and includes contributions from musicians such as Tom Scott, Jim Horn, Billy Preston, Willie Weeks and Andy Newmark.

Harrison played "Dark Horse" throughout the 1974 tour and his 1991 Japanese tour with Eric Clapton. A live version appears on his 1992 album Live in Japan. Recordings also exist of Harrison performing the song during radio and television appearances in the 1970s, although none are available on official releases. The studio recording was included on the 1976 compilation The Best of George Harrison. The 2014 Apple Years reissue of Dark Horse includes an acoustic demo of the song, which Harrison recorded in 1974 before the onset of laryngitis.

== Background and inspiration ==
George Harrison wrote "Dark Horse" in 1973, having emerged as the unexpected front-runner, or dark horse, among the former members of the Beatles. His ascendancy had begun before the group's break-up in 1970, with his two song contributions to their 1969 album Abbey Road. Although his 1973 album Living in the Material World had divided music critics due to its overt religiosity, he was still widely viewed as the most accomplished solo artist of the four former bandmates. Harrison said the term "dark horse" was an accurate description for him as "The one nobody's bothered to put any money on [to win]. That's me I guess."

"Dark Horse" is the old story. "Mr. Penguin's poking Mrs. Johnson from the Co-op." "Oh really! ... he's a bit of a dark horse isn't he?" I didn't know 'til later the other idea of a dark horse ... I'm a bit thick really.

– George Harrison commenting on the song in I, Me, Mine (1980)

In a 1974 BBC Radio 1 interview with Alan Freeman, Harrison recalled starting to write the song at five o'clock one morning as he was on his way to bed. Harrison said he approached the title phrase with the meaning he knew from growing up in Liverpool – where a dark horse was someone who carries out clandestine sexual relationships. In the same interview, he compared his personal life to the radio drama Mrs Dale's Diary but added that he did not need to read gossip published in magazines such as Rolling Stone and Woman's Own, written by people who "think they know something" about him, when he was fully aware of his transgressions. In that context, he summed up the song's message as "I'll admit my sins or failings, as long as you all admit to yours too." (Note: In a 1975 interview, Harrison said he completed the lyrics while "having breakfast at tea-time", the day after getting the initial idea for the song, and then recorded it straight away. Asked about its autobiographical content, he said that the line "I'm a dark horse" was "very English, and might be taken as an admission of something", but the follow-on – "Running on a dark race course" – was the best and "most important" line, and meant "the whole situation is pretty shady".)

Biographer Elliot Huntley describes "Dark Horse" as a song that addresses "people's perceptions" of Harrison. His marriage to Pattie Boyd had become the source of rumour and speculation since late 1973. In November, Faces guitarist Ron Wood told the press that he and Boyd were having an affair, which Harrison dismissed in a statement the next day, and Harrison conducted an affair with Wood's wife. Harrison later described his behaviour during their final years together as "the naughty period, 1973−74". In addition, Harrison was reportedly stung by the criticism of the overt Vaishnava Hindu spirituality in his music. His purchase of Bhaktivedanta Manor in early 1973, as a UK headquarters for the Hare Krishna movement, led to ridicule in the British press. (Note: Harrison visited the house in July 1973 for a meeting with Bhaktivedanta Swami Prabhupada, the movement's international leader. Harrison confided to Prabhupada: "I'm provoking a bad reaction. The stronger the commitment on my part, the stronger the animosity becomes.") In his 1974 Dark Horse Radio Special interview, recorded with Nicky Horne of Capital Radio, Harrison dismissed his reputation as the "weird mystical ex-Beatle, the gentle giant of pop" as media misrepresentation. Theologian Dale Allison writes that Harrison's comments on "Dark Horse" in his 1980 autobiography, I, Me, Mine, are as "obscure" as the song's lyrics. He adds that the lyrics lack religious imagery, and suggest instead either a song to Boyd about adultery or a message to detractors regarding his public image.

== Composition ==
=== Music ===
"Dark Horse" is in 4/4 time throughout. The composition consists of three verses and choruses, with a chord-based guitar riff introducing each verse, and a repeated chorus to end the song. Its musical key is B major in the verses, while the chords over the choruses suggest both G major and A major. The verses use seventh chords throughout. In musicologist Thomas MacFarlane's view, a forward motion results from the tension caused by the melody's use of these three key areas, a quality that he says masks the composition's essentially simple structure.

Harrison plays the song with a capo on the seventh fret of his guitar, a common device in his songwriting since the Beatles' "If I Needed Someone" and "Here Comes the Sun". The melody is thereby transposed so that the guitar riff is played over A7 and E7 chords. According to MacFarlane, the composition is an example of Harrison fully embracing roots influences, while the musical arrangement on the released recording incorporates aspects of folk and jazz in a fusion similar to Joni Mitchell's work.

=== Lyrical interpretation ===
Authors Simon Leng and Ian Inglis each view "Dark Horse" as a possible rebuttal to critics of Living in the Material World. Inglis also interprets it as Harrison's message of defiance to Boyd, as do music journalists Nick Hasted and Lindsay Planer. In Leng's description, "Dark Horse" shows its composer addressing his critics by creating a "new persona". "This 'George' is a man one step ahead of his detractors," Leng continues, "triumphing with quicker feet and better gags. Commentators try to pin his character down at peril, for he is likely to change and take the least expected course." In the song's choruses, Harrison declares himself "a dark horse" on "a dark race course", "a blue moon", and a "cool jerk" who is "Looking for the source". (Note: Inglis speculates that Harrison's inspiration for "Dark Horse" may have been "Cool Jerk", a 1966 hit single by the Capitols. He says that aside from Harrison's use of the titular phrase, the lyrics convey similar sentiments to songwriter Don Storball's contention in "Cool Jerk" that, despite his detractors' posturing, "deep down inside they know I'm cool".) Leng paraphrases this self-depiction as meaning "a loner" and "an elusive, cheeky maverick".

While describing the lyrics as "smarmy, if not somewhat defensive", Planer identifies the song's opening verse as "seem[ing] to address the situation" between Harrison and Boyd, with lines such as "You thought that you knew where I was and when / Baby, looks like you've been fooling you again". Planer states that the "searing" verse-two lines "You thought you had got me in your grip / Baby, looks like you was not so smart" are a further example of this interpretation. (Note: Pop historian Andrew Grant Jackson writes that an initial reading of the song's lyrics suggests a "beat[ing] his chest a bit" riposte to critics of Material World. However, given that Harrison's comments in I, Me, Mine focus solely on a dark horse in the sense of a neighbourhood adulterer, the lyrics can instead be read as "vampiric gloating" by the singer and suggestive of "games of sexual one-up-manship" between Harrison and Boyd.)

Like Planer, Inglis recognises Harrison's former bandmates John Lennon and Paul McCartney as another possible target of his scorn. Inglis comments that in the final verse, Harrison is making it clear to those who have underestimated him in the past that his abilities are not "recent acquisitions":

I thought that you knew it all along
Until you started getting me not right
Seems as if you heard a little late
I warned you when we both was at the starting gate.

Leng says that this Harrison "character" returns in his 1976 composition "This Song", written as a light-hearted reflection on his "travails in court" during the "My Sweet Lord" plagiarism case.

== Recording ==
=== 1973 basic track ===
Logo for Harrison's record label, which he named after his song "Dark Horse"

Harrison first recorded "Dark Horse" at his Friar Park studio, FPSHOT, in Oxfordshire, in November 1973. The sessions that month, which included contributions from Ringo Starr, Jim Keltner, Klaus Voormann and Gary Wright, marked the start of recording for his Dark Horse album. This early version is slower in tempo and more relaxed than the official release.

In early 1974, Harrison included the song, along with rough mixes of "Ding Dong, Ding Dong" and recordings by Splinter and Ravi Shankar, on a tape he compiled for David Geffen, the head of Asylum Records in Los Angeles. At the time, with the Beatles' Apple record label being wound down, Harrison was looking for a way to release these projects. "Dark Horse" provided the name for the record label he subsequently founded, Dark Horse Records, when he agreed terms in May for worldwide distribution through A&M Records. Shankar and Splinter were the first acts signed to the label. Harrison then announced that he would be touring North America in November and December. Intended to promote Dark Horse Records, the tour featured Shankar as co-headliner and it was the first US tour by a member of the Beatles since 1966.

=== Official version ===
By October, when he arrived in Los Angeles to prepare for the tour, a combination of Harrison's business commitments, his dedication to projects by Shankar and Splinter, and a lifestyle that Leng terms "one drink too many, too frequently" meant that production on Dark Horse was severely behind schedule. His personal life continued to be the source of public intrigue. Boyd left Harrison for his friend Eric Clapton in July and he holidayed with model Kathy Simmons the following month; in addition, rumours had reached the US about Harrison having an affair with Starr's wife, Maureen Starkey. (Note: In a reaction that he later called "just a little joke", Harrison recorded a version of the Everly Brothers' 1957 hit "Bye Bye Love" for Dark Horse, with new lyrics that wished Boyd and Clapton happiness while also stating that he "threw them both out".) Along with speculation about the Beatles, Harrison's marriage was among the issues raised by reporters at his pre-tour press conference in Los Angeles, on 23 October. Harrison stated that his new album was "like Peyton Place" and would reveal all the details regarding his private life.

Question: Do you have any anxieties as the tour approaches?
Harrison: The main one is that I've lost my voice … It's getting a bit rough and gravelly. There's a good chance that on the first few concerts I'm gonna come out playing instrumentals. (Laughter from Harrison and the audience.)

– The Valley Advocate, reporting on Harrison's pre-tour press conference

Starting on 15 October, Harrison rehearsed with his tour band at the A&M studio complex on La Brea Avenue, Hollywood. In the evenings, he added vocals and other overdubs to some of the tracks recorded at Friar Park. He had intended to finish "Dark Horse" in this way but decided instead to re-record the track, since the musicians were having to learn the song for inclusion in the concert setlist.

Already exhausted through overwork before arriving in Los Angeles, Harrison lost his voice during the rehearsals and contracted laryngitis. The effects were especially evident on "Dark Horse". Harrison and his tour band – which included Tom Scott, Billy Preston, Willie Weeks and Andy Newmark – recorded the track live on a sound stage at A&M in late October, a few days before the opening concert on 2 November. Norm Kinney engineered the session. Lon and Derrek Van Eaton, who, like Preston, were a former Apple act now signed with A&M Records, overdubbed backing vocals soon afterwards. (Note: In an interview with Mark Bego, Lon Van Eaton recalled that these vocal overdubs were done straight after he, his brother Derrek and Harrison attended a party. He said that, much to Harrison's annoyance, the security guard at the studio gate failed to recognise the ex-Beatle and refused to let the party in at first.)

Harrison described his lead vocal on the song as sounding like the singer Louis Armstrong; he later told reporters that he quite liked the result. According to Newmark, however, Harrison was concerned about how concert-goers would react to his shot vocals. The arrangement includes a trio of flute players, led by Scott; Preston on electric piano; and Robben Ford on a second acoustic guitar. Keltner, Harrison's regular drummer, provided hi-hats, supporting Newmark's beat. In addition, Emil Richards played a percussion instrument known as a crochet.

== Release ==
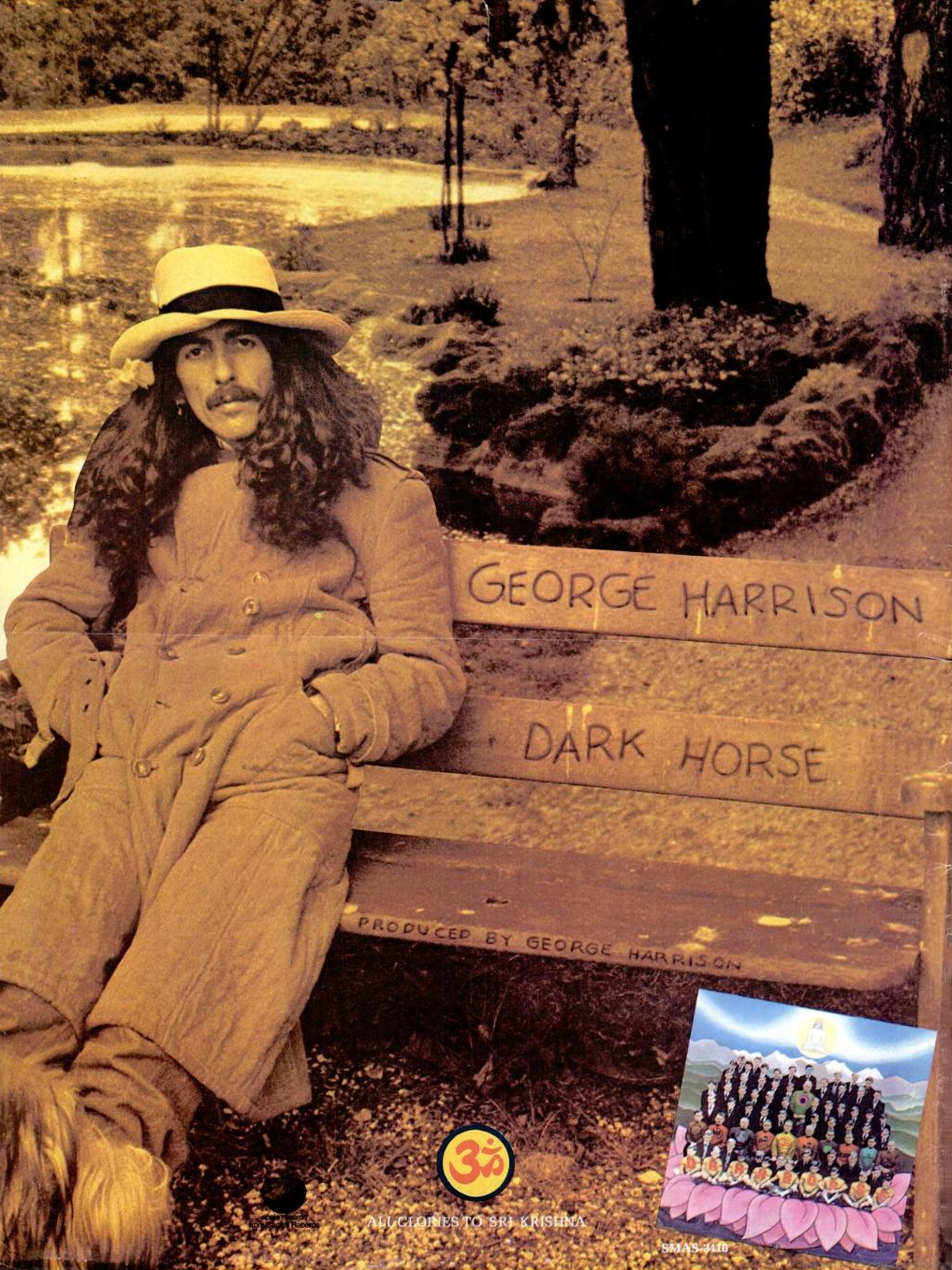
Trade ad for the Dark Horse album, December 1974

Backed with "I Don't Care Anymore", "Dark Horse" was issued as the album's lead single in America (as Apple 1877), on 18 November 1974. It was one of only three tracks from Dark Horse that Harrison performed during the tour. The single was available in a white sleeve on which the song lyrics and a large dot appeared in blue print. Capitol Records, Apple's US distributor, sent an edited mix, cutting a minute's worth from the middle of the song, as a promotional disc for radio stations across America.

"Dark Horse" made a strong impact as a single, authors Chip Madinger and Mark Easter write, reaching the US top 20 "with ease". It then peaked at a relatively low number 15 on the Billboard Hot 100, however, on 11 January 1975, before disappearing from the chart altogether two weeks later. In Canada, where the tour had begun on 2 November, "Dark Horse" reached number 26 on RPM's singles chart. In Britain, the song was released as the second single off Dark Horse, on 28 February 1975 (as Apple R 6001), with the show-opening instrumental "Hari's on Tour (Express)" on the B-side. The single failed to place on the UK Singles Chart, then just a top 50. It was Harrison's first single to miss the UK chart and the second by a former Beatle, after Starr's "Snookeroo", released shortly before "Dark Horse".

Due to the delay in completing the recording, Capitol was unable to issue the Dark Horse album until the second week of December, towards the end of the tour. "Dark Horse" appeared as the second track on side two of the LP, between "Ding Dong, Ding Dong", the album's other single, and the soul-inflected "Far East Man". In his handwritten sleeve notes, Harrison lists A&M Records secretary and future wife Olivia Arias among the participating musicians, her contribution being "Blissed out". The couple had first met at the start of Harrison's hectic few weeks in Los Angeles, and Arias became his constant companion on the tour.

"Dark Horse" appeared on the 1976 Capitol compilation The Best of George Harrison but it was omitted from the posthumous, career-spanning Let It Roll: Songs by George Harrison in 2009. Having last been remastered for Dark Horse's debut release on CD, in January 1992, the song was remastered for inclusion on Harrison's Apple Years 1968–75 reissues, released in September 2014.

== Reception ==
=== Contemporary reviews ===
On release, Billboard magazine described "Dark Horse" as "a pleasing, acoustic flavored cut" with an "instantly catchy sound that should satisfy AM listeners and more 'critical' fans", adding that the use of flutes "spices [up]" the recording. The following month, the same magazine's album review referred to Harrison "riding high" with the title track and found "lots of FM potential" in the songs on Dark Horse. Cash Box said the song had "a strange lyric line that could be a metaphor for a lot of things even a record company" and commented on Harrison's "very melodic vocal and fine arrangement". Record World said that Harrison "makes a triumphant return astride yet another metaphysical masterpiece."

With the US release coming two weeks into Harrison's high-profile tour with Shankar, much of the critical reaction there to "Dark Horse" centred on the perilous state of Harrison's voice. "Dark Hoarse" was a widely used moniker, as several concert reviewers wrote disparagingly of Harrison "croaking" his way through Beatles classics such as "Something" and "In My Life". Discussing this period of Harrison's career in an article for Mojo, in November 2014, Mat Snow writes that "George's '70s honeymoon with the public was over"; it also resulted in a critical backlash after his successes since 1970. In a highly unfavourable review of the album, for Rolling Stone, Jim Miller quoted the chorus of the title track to illustrate his point that the singer's "quest for illumination populates his lyrics with sermons and awkward mea culpas". Miller added that "thanks to Harrison's no-voice and stilted lyrics, ['Dark Horse'] quite fails to evoke the self-confident master of 'My Sweet Lord' or even 'Living in the Material World.'" Reviewing the album for the NME, Bob Woffinden took exception to Harrison's lyrics, ridiculing "Dark Horse" as "a putdown of Patti [Boyd], an affirmation of Harrison's male chauvinism – he was on top of the game all through".

Among more favourable reviews, Michael Gross of Circus Raves defended the Harrison–Shankar tour as having been "plagued by untrue press reports [while] creating a new, unbounded music that defied labelling as easily as the men involved defied national boundaries". Gross wrote that "Dark Horse" "brings back memories of The White Album, as Chuck Findlay, Jim Horn and Scott dart through the intricate melody on flutes". In Melody Maker, Brian Harrigan found Harrison's gruff vocal a bonus, writing that he "coaxes a tremendous amount from his normally unimpressive voice" and sings "particularly well" on the title track. Harrigan highlighted "Dark Horse" as "easily the strongest number on the album", with Newmark and Preston "playing up a storm". Reviewing the single for the same publication, Colin Irwin gave it a "hit" prediction and described it as the "Best single for quite a long time from the galloping guru", with Harrison sounding "like a latter day Dylan wailing above an easy-going backing that includes some attractive guitar and a crisp rhythm".

In their 1975 book The Beatles: An Illustrated Record, NME critics Roy Carr and Tony Tyler approved of Harrison's husky singing on "Dark Horse", saying it was "definitely a style to pursue". Nicholas Schaffner, writing in The Beatles Forever, opined that "Dark Horse" could have been one of Harrison's most successful singles had he "only waited to recoup his voice before committing it to tape". (Note: Seven years after his unfavourable review in the NME, Woffinden wrote that the song would have sounded "really good" had it been "graced with good vocals" and released in a "different context".)

=== Retrospective assessments and legacy ===
Writing for Rolling Stone in 2002, Greg Kot took issue with Harrison's strained vocal and viewed the song as "continu[ing] in the condescending autobiographical vein" of Material World tracks such as "The Light That Has Lighted the World". Conversely, author Alan Clayson has written of the song's "sandpapery appeal", with the lead vocal "a not unattractive cross between McCartney and Rod Stewart". Writing for Rough Guides, Chris Ingham describes it as one of the album's three best tracks, saying that Harrison "gamely struggles with a shot-to-pieces throat to deliver a pleasingly gruff vocal".

Simon Leng considers "Dark Horse" to be a "jaunty and pleasing hit" and one of Harrison's best compositions, but rues that Harrison did not marry up his vocal from an earlier, bluesy demo with the backing he subsequently recorded in Los Angeles. Leng adds that the song would surely have been a bigger hit without a vocal that sounded "like the torments of a man swallowing razor blades". Dale Allison also subscribes to this view, while Elliot Huntley writes that "Dark Horse" might have made an "excellent stand-alone single", backed by "So Sad". This coupling would have provided Harrison with the necessary product to promote on tour, Huntley continues, without "temporarily derailing [his career] at full speed". (Note: Huntley adds that with the success Harrison had achieved as a solo artist until Dark Horse, his boastful sentiments on the title track were understandable, yet his compromised 1974 album weakened the credibility of his claim as the Beatles' dark horse.)

Reviewing Harrison's 2014 Apple Years reissues for the Chicago Tribune, Mark Caro describes "Dark Horse" as "one of [Harrison's] most sublime creations despite his dark-hoarse vocals". Paul Trynka, in a review for Classic Rock, deems it "a fine song … marred by George's voice, tired, worn and sapped of its usual sweetness". Nick Hasted of Uncut bemoans that the song's "growled vocal" "squanders its brisk, appealing tune", and he describes Harrison's persona as a "mean, Jumping Jack Flash-style alias" singing verses that "lash out at his ex".

Andrew Grant Jackson features "Dark Horse" in his book Still the Greatest: The Essential Solo Beatles Songs. He writes that "the huskiness of his voice threatens to distract", but "the strength of the composition, the uplifting chorus, the 'Stairway to Heaven'-esque flute by Tom Scott, and the subtly funk keys by Preston nudge it into Harrison's top tier, though just by a nose."

== Other versions ==
Harrison performed the song throughout both the 1974 tour and his 1991 Japanese tour with Eric Clapton, his only other tour as a solo artist. He also recorded "Dark Horse" several before and after the officially released studio version. The tape sent to David Geffen, including the slower take from the November 1973 sessions and "Ding Dong", became available on bootleg compilations such as The Harri-Spector Show.

=== 1974 demo ===
The 2014 Apple Years reissue of Dark Horse includes a previously unreleased version of "Dark Horse". Recorded as a solo demo, it features Harrison on vocals and acoustic guitar, with added backing vocals. (Note: The performance ends with what Hasted describes as Harrison "half-jokingly" muttering: "So fucking watch it.") Brennan Carley of Spin writes of the "newly unearthed version" being "a bit twangier and more acoustic than Harrison's final product" and describes his singing as "clearer, less gruff, and more natural" than the 1974 release. While viewing "Dark Horse" as "a great personal theme song of sorts" for Harrison, Blogcritics' Chaz Lipp considers his lead vocal on this "excellent demo" to be an improvement. Trynka similarly writes that this version "puts things right", with Harrison's vocal "impassioned, but subtle".

=== October–December 1974 radio and television performances ===
In October 1974, shortly before leaving for Los Angeles, Harrison performed "Dark Horse" on acoustic guitar during his interview with Alan Freeman for the Radio 1 show Rockspeak. In addition to discussing the song, Harrison provided forthright opinions. He enthused about Clapton and Shankar, jokingly referred to John Lennon as "a saint" and "such a bastard", and claimed that Paul McCartney had "ruined" him as a guitar player. The interview, which begins with Harrison's performance of "Dark Horse", was broadcast on the 6 December edition of Rockspeak. (Note: In the US, it aired as Rock Around the World in October 1975, as part of the promotion for Harrison's final Apple Records album, Extra Texture.)

On 30 October, days before the band left for the first show in Vancouver, Harrison and his musicians recorded an abridged live performance of the song for promotional purposes at the A&M sound stage where they were rehearsing. Later in the tour, Harrison found a way to alter his vocal pitch to better cope with the effects of laryngitis, but Leng writes of this performance: "It gives a candid glimpse of the pain [that] Harrison's need to sing was inflicting on him." At the end of the 1974 tour, Harrison and the band filmed another performance of "Dark Horse", intended for inclusion in the debut series of Saturday Night Live. The filming took place at NBC TV Studios in New York on 19 December, but the network decided to delay the show for a year and the Harrison segment was never aired.

=== November 1976, Saturday Night Live ===
In November 1976, while promoting his first album on Dark Horse Records, Thirty Three & 1/3, Harrison finally appeared on Saturday Night Live, performing a number of songs with Paul Simon, as well as a solo version of "Dark Horse". Although the song does not appear on lists of the tracks taped on 19 November at NBC, Clayson writes of Harrison singing "Dark Horse", "hunched over a hollow-body Gretsch", in a blue-lit studio. (Note: Harrison and Simon's duet on "Homeward Bound" later appeared on the Olivia Harrison-inspired charity album Nobody's Child: Romanian Angel Appeal in 1990, but nothing else from this 1976 performance has been officially released.)

=== 1991 Japanese tour ===
In what Leng terms a "safe" setlist for his 1991 Japanese tour with Clapton, Harrison's inclusion of "Dark Horse" provided a rare example of a song from his post-All Things Must Pass work from the 1970s. His performance of the song from the 11 December show at Osaka's Castle Hall appears on the Live in Japan double album, released in July 1992. It was also one of five tracks selected by Warner Bros. Records for the promotional CD Live in Japan Sampler. In Huntley's view, it was "a joy" to hear this live version, as "Unencumbered by problems with his throat, the catchiness of 'Dark Horse' positively shines through."

== Personnel ==
- George Harrison – lead vocals, acoustic guitar
- Robben Ford – acoustic guitar
- Billy Preston – electric piano
- Willie Weeks – bass guitar
- Andy Newmark – drums
- Jim Keltner – drums
- Tom Scott – flute
- Jim Horn – flute
- Chuck Findley – flute
- Emil Richards – percussion
- Derrek Van Eaton – backing vocals
- Lon Van Eaton – backing vocals

== Chart performance ==
Chart (1974–75)	Peak position
Canadian RPM Top Singles	26
US Billboard Hot 100	15
US Cash Box Top 100	19
US Record World Singles Chart	27
West German Media Control Chart	46

== Sources ==
- Dale C. Allison Jr, The Love There That's Sleeping: The Art and Spirituality of George Harrison, Continuum (New York, NY, 2006; ISBN 978-0-8264-1917-0).
- Keith Badman, The Beatles Diary Volume 2: After the Break-Up 1970–2001, Omnibus Press (London, 2001; ISBN 0-7119-8307-0).
- Roy Carr & Tony Tyler, The Beatles: An Illustrated Record, Trewin Copplestone Publishing (London, 1978; ISBN 0-450-04170-0).
- Harry Castleman & Walter J. Podrazik, All Together Now: The First Complete Beatles Discography 1961–1975, Ballantine Books (New York, NY, 1976; ISBN 0-345-25680-8).
- Alan Clayson, George Harrison, Sanctuary (London, 2003; ISBN 1-86074-489-3).
- Peter Doggett, You Never Give Me Your Money: The Beatles After the Breakup, It Books (New York, NY, 2011; ISBN 978-0-06-177418-8).
- The Editors of Rolling Stone, Harrison, Rolling Stone Press/Simon & Schuster (New York, NY, 2002; ISBN 0-7432-3581-9).
- Michael Frontani, "The Solo Years", in Kenneth Womack (ed.), The Cambridge Companion to the Beatles, Cambridge University Press (Cambridge, UK, 2009; ISBN 978-1-139-82806-2), pp. 153–82 & 265–74.
- Joshua M. Greene, Here Comes the Sun: The Spiritual and Musical Journey of George Harrison, John Wiley & Sons (Hoboken, NJ, 2006; ISBN 978-0-470-12780-3).
- George Harrison, I Me Mine, Chronicle Books (San Francisco, CA, 2002 [1980]; ISBN 0-8118-3793-9).
- Olivia Harrison, George Harrison: Living in the Material World, Abrams (New York, NY, 2011; ISBN 978-1-4197-0220-4).
- Bill Harry, The George Harrison Encyclopedia, Virgin Books (London, 2003; ISBN 978-0-7535-0822-0).
- Chris Hunt (ed.), NME Originals: Beatles – The Solo Years 1970–1980, IPC Ignite! (London, 2005).
- Elliot J. Huntley, Mystical One: George Harrison – After the Break-up of the Beatles, Guernica Editions (Toronto, ON, 2006; ISBN 1-55071-197-0).
- Chris Ingham, The Rough Guide to the Beatles (2nd edn), Rough Guides/Penguin (London, 2006; ISBN 978-1-84836-525-4).
- Ian Inglis, The Words and Music of George Harrison, Praeger (Santa Barbara, CA, 2010; ISBN 978-0-313-37532-3).
- Andrew Grant Jackson, Still the Greatest: The Essential Solo Beatles Songs, Scarecrow Press (Lanham, MD, 2012; ISBN 978-0-8108-8222-5).
- Ashley Kahn (ed.), George Harrison on George Harrison: Interviews and Encounters, Chicago Review Press (Chicago, IL, 2020; ISBN 978-1-64160-051-4).
- Peter Lavezzoli, The Dawn of Indian Music in the West, Continuum (New York, NY, 2006; ISBN 0-8264-2819-3).
- Simon Leng, While My Guitar Gently Weeps: The Music of George Harrison, Hal Leonard (Milwaukee, WI, 2006; ISBN 1-4234-0609-5).
- Thomas MacFarlane, The Music of George Harrison, Routledge (Abingdon, UK, 2019; ISBN 978-1-138-59910-9).
- Chip Madinger & Mark Easter, Eight Arms to Hold You: The Solo Beatles Compendium, 44.1 Productions (Chesterfield, MO, 2000; ISBN 0-615-11724-4).
- Jörg Pieper, The Solo Beatles Film & TV Chronicle 1971–1980, Premium Förlag (Stockholm, 2012; ISBN 978-1-4092-8301-0).
- Robert Rodriguez, Fab Four FAQ 2.0: The Beatles' Solo Years, 1970–1980, Backbeat Books (Milwaukee, WI, 2010; ISBN 978-1-4165-9093-4).
- Nicholas Schaffner, The Beatles Forever, McGraw-Hill (New York, NY, 1978; ISBN 0-07-055087-5).
- Bruce Spizer, The Beatles Solo on Apple Records, 498 Productions (New Orleans, LA, 2005; ISBN 0-9662649-5-9).
- Gary Tillery, Working Class Mystic: A Spiritual Biography of George Harrison, Quest Books (Wheaton, IL, 2011; ISBN 978-0-8356-0900-5).
- Bob Woffinden, The Beatles Apart, Proteus (London, 1981; ISBN 0-906071-89-5).
