= Piggies =

1968 song by The Beatles

- Cover of the Apple Publishing sheet music (depicting John Lennon)

Song by the Beatles

from the album The Beatles
- Released: 22 November 1968
- Recorded: 19–20 September and 10 October 1968
- Studio: EMI, London
- Genre: Baroque pop; folk
- Length: 2:04
- Label: Apple
- Songwriter: George Harrison
- Producer: George Martin

"Piggies" is a song by the English rock band the Beatles from their 1968 album The Beatles (also known as the "White Album"). Written by George Harrison as a social commentary, the song serves as an Orwellian satire on greed and consumerism. Among several elements it incorporates from classical music, the track features harpsichord and orchestral strings in the baroque pop style, which are contrasted by Harrison's acerbic lyrics and the sound of grunting pigs. Although credited to George Martin, the recording was largely produced by Chris Thomas, who also contributed the harpsichord part.

In the context of the turbulent political climate of 1968, "Piggies" was adopted by the counterculture as an anti-establishment theme song. It was also among the tracks on The Beatles that cult leader Charles Manson used as the foundation for his Helter Skelter theory of an American race-related countercultural revolution. Inspired especially by the line "What they need's a damn good whacking", Manson's followers left clues relating to the lyrics at the scenes of the Tate–LaBianca murders in August 1969.

"Piggies" has received widely varying responses from music critics, and its reputation suffered due to the association with Manson following the latter's trial in 1971. While some reviewers admire its musical qualities and recognise sardonic humour in the lyrics, others consider the song to be mean-spirited and lacking in subtlety. Harrison's demo of the song, recorded at his home in Surrey, was included on the Beatles' 1996 compilation Anthology 3. A live version by Harrison, reinstating a verse that was omitted from the studio recording, appears on his 1992 album Live in Japan. Folk singer and activist Theo Bikel and anarcho-punk musician Danbert Nobacon are among the artists who have covered "Piggies".

== Background and inspiration ==
George Harrison began writing "Piggies" in early 1966, around the time that the Beatles were recording their album Revolver. He returned to the song two years later, after discovering his manuscript in the attic of his parents' house in Liverpool. The same visit led to Harrison starting a new composition, "While My Guitar Gently Weeps", which he similarly completed for inclusion on the Beatles' self-titled double album (also known as "the White Album"). (Note: After Ringo Starr's "Don't Pass Me By", "Piggies" was therefore the second oldest song recorded for The Beatles, most of which was written during or soon after the group's visit to India in early 1968.)

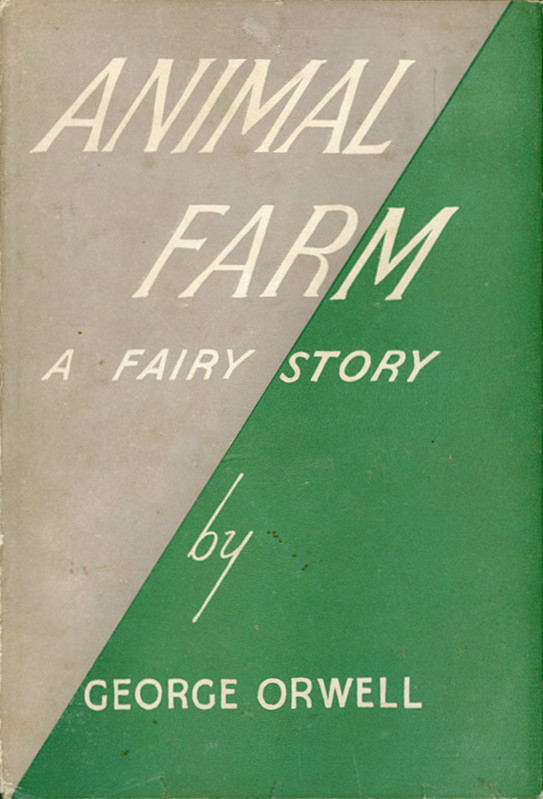
In "Piggies", Harrison drew from the premise of George Orwell's dystopian novel Animal Farm.

As an anti-establishment song, "Piggies" recalls Harrison's Revolver composition "Taxman". In his 1980 autobiography, I, Me, Mine, Harrison describes "Piggies" as a social commentary. He intended it as a light-hearted satire on consumerism and class distinction. Through its theme of social strata within a community of farm animals (in this case, one consisting entirely of pigs), the song references George Orwell's 1945 novel Animal Farm. According to Harrison's early draft of "Piggies", the lyrics contained a final verse, subsequently cut for the Beatles' recording, that ends with the animals "Paying piggy thanks – to thee Pig Brother!" Musicologist Walter Everett cites these words as evidence that Harrison's main inspiration for the song was Orwell's work, particularly "his fable of autocracy masquerading as democracy, Animal Farm". While also identifying Orwell's book as an influence on the composition, author Ian Inglis views "Piggies" as one of several White Album songs in which the Beatles drew inspiration from their childhood in the 1940s.

During Harrison's Liverpool visit in early 1968, his mother, Louise, responded to his request for assistance with the lyrics by providing the line "What they need's a damn good whacking". Harrison then taped a demo of the song at his house in Esher, Surrey, in late May that year. Following this recording, John Lennon supplied the final phrase in the line "Clutching forks and knives to eat their bacon", replacing the words "to cut their pork chops", which Harrison had sung on the demo version. When performing "Piggies" in concert during the early 1990s, Harrison reinstated the omitted final verse.

From 1966, particularly in the United States, the slang usage of the word "pig" had grown from being a derogatory term for a police officer to refer also to consumerism and establishment figures in general. This was especially so in 1968, as the counterculture became more politically focused, coinciding with the rise of the Black Power movement and the number of mass demonstrations against America's involvement in the Vietnam War. Although author Jon Wiener terms Harrison and Lennon "the radicals among the Beatles", citing their past outspokenness about Vietnam and their readiness to embrace LSD experimentation and Transcendental Meditation, Harrison denied that he was using "pig" in its new context. Inglis nevertheless says that the song title alone "references" the countercultural view of police officers.

== Composition ==
=== Music ===
"Piggies" features baroque musical elements in its melody and texture. Music journalist Steve Smith groups the song with the Paul McCartney-written "For No One" and "She's Leaving Home" as examples of the Beatles' forays into baroque pop. Harrison biographer Simon Leng recognises the composition as essentially a folk song, however, that was then given a "satirical, drawing-room [musical] arrangement" on the official recording by the prominence of harpsichord and orchestral strings.

The song's musical key is A♭. Its structure comprises two verses, a middle eight (or bridge) section, an instrumental passage (over the verse melody), followed by a final verse that leads into a coda (or outro) and a formal ending. In his commentary on "Piggies", musicologist Alan Pollack remarks on its abundance of classical music traits. These include the use of "arpeggio fragments" in Harrison's opening guitar motif and the repetition of this four-bar passage before each verse and the bridge – a device typical of Schubert's various lieder and the works of other nineteenth-century composers. During the song, the expected cycle of fifth notes in the major scale is interrupted through the inclusion of a III^{7} (C^{7}) chord, which first appears at the end of the passage leading into the middle eight, before the melody drops down a tone to the minor ii (B♭m) chord. The same section's first line ends with the surprise inclusion of a blues-based riff, soon after which the C7 chord is used again in the ascent to the IV (subdominant) chord, helping to accentuate the phrase "damn good whacking".

As a further example of the melody's baroque characteristics, the bridge contains an implied but unfulfilled tonicisation of VI. In addition, over the coda, the recurring four-bar instrumental passage is partly shifted to a parallel minor, through the use of the more classically oriented A♭m chord, rather than its major equivalent as before. (Note: Although "Piggies" changed little in form between the demo and the formally recorded version, relative to other songs previewed at Esher by the Beatles, the baroque-influenced coda was not present in Harrison's May 1968 performance.) Following the instrumental coda, the song ends with the strings playing a tonically ambiguous cadence, which Everett describes as an unexpected "diminished fourth away from tonic".

=== Lyrics ===
Inglis writes that while the nursery rhyme form was Harrison's musical source for "Piggies", his lyrics adopt a political perspective, creating "a savage attack on the corporate greed of contemporary capitalism". In the first verse, Harrison sings of "the little piggies", for whom "life is getting worse". In verse two, "the bigger piggies" are described as "stirring up" the dirt that those smaller animals "crawl" in, while they themselves are dressed in "starched white shirts". According to music journalist Kit O'Toole, whereas the song's harpsichord-led introduction "suggests a salon featuring royalty in their finery", the lyrics immediately nullify this image in their depiction of pigs toiling in mud, thereby heightening the overall satirical effect. Everett comments that the same contrast between refined instrumentation and uncompromising subject matter was later adopted by Stevie Wonder for his track "Village Ghetto Land", issued on Songs in the Key of Life (1976).

During the middle eight, Harrison refers to the privileged pigs in their sties who "don't care what goes on around"; they appear devoid of empathy, and therefore deserve "a damn good whacking". In the third verse, Harrison declares that piggies are "everywhere", leading "piggy lives". He presents a final image of couples dining, holding their cutlery before devouring bacon.

== Production ==
=== Recording ===
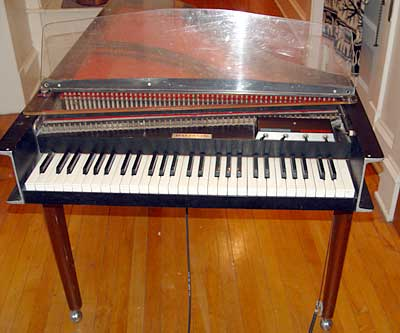
The harpsichord, an instrument widely associated with classical music, features prominently on the Beatles' recording.

The Beatles recorded the basic track for "Piggies" at EMI Studios (now Abbey Road Studios) in London on 19 September 1968. After Harrison had performed the song alone on the Esher demo – playing acoustic guitar and whistling over the solo – the use of harpsichord on the official recording came about through happenstance. Acting as a producer in George Martin's absence on some of the White Album sessions, Chris Thomas noticed the instrument set up in preparation for a later session, for a classical recording, in EMI's Studio 1. Harrison agreed that a harpsichord part would suit the song, and so the Beatles' session was moved from Studio 2. (Note: Thomas later recalled that while they worked on "Piggies", Harrison played an early version of "Something", saying that he might offer it to his Apple Records signing Jackie Lomax, and McCartney previewed his composition "Let It Be".)

The group taped eleven takes of "Piggies" before achieving the requisite performance. The line-up was Harrison on acoustic guitar, Thomas on harpsichord, McCartney on bass and Ringo Starr on tambourine. Lennon was present at the session but, with only 4-track recording facilities available in Studio 1 (and the available tracks taken up by the other four musicians), he did not play on the basic track. Having attended London's Royal Academy of Music as a child, Thomas performed the harpsichord solo in an authentic classical style, according to Pollack, who highlights how "the melody played by the last three fingers [of the right hand] alternates with a repeated note played by the thumb".

=== Overdubbing ===
On 20 September, the recording was copied over to 8-track tape in Studio 2, to allow for overdubbing. Harrison then added his lead vocal, together with harmony vocals on the last verse, creating a mock operatic chorus over the latter section. Through the combination of studio effects and overdubs, his vocal performance on the song consists of three contrasting segments; in Inglis' description, these comprise a "naturalistic" approach at the start of the track, "a distorted middle", and chorus singing at the end. To produce the sharp nasal sound over the middle eight, Harrison sang through a filter that limited the signal to a narrow, 3.5-kilohertz band. (Note: Alternatively, the lead vocal was treated with automatic double tracking on the phrase "play around in", which appears at the end of the first and second verses.) Described by Everett as "remarkable", the pitch of Harrison's vocals in the final verse ranges from a low E♭ bass note in one of the harmony parts, to a descant falsetto B♭_{4} in the high harmony part. Lennon created a tape loop of pre-recorded pig noises, sourced from EMI's library, as well as supplying his own grunting sounds. (Note: Referring to the group's performance on 19 September, Beatles historian Mark Lewisohn also comments on McCartney plucking the strings of his bass guitar in a manner that suggests "the sound of a pig grunting".) Drum beats were also added, marking the transition from the solo into the third verse.

Final overdubs on the song were carried out on 10 October, during the last week of recording for The Beatles. Having returned from his extended holiday, Martin wrote a string arrangement for four violins, two violas and two cellos. These parts were recorded during the same orchestral overdubbing session as for Lennon's track "Glass Onion". Towards the end of "Piggies", Harrison added the spoken words "One more time", before the orchestra played the last two chords. In his overview of the recording, author and critic Tim Riley interprets the "thick scouse" delivery of this introduction to the "final grand cadence" as Harrison "smearing social elitists with their own symbols of 'high' culture". Everett refers to the contrast between the various classical elements and the combination of pig sounds and "rude" final cadence as representing an "Orwellian comparison of pigs to socially horrid, though outwardly refined, tyrants".

Mixing on "Piggies" was completed on 11 October. The mono mix has the animal sounds appearing at different points in the song, relative to the stereo version. (Note: The Beatles was originally available in both stereo and mono formats in the UK but only in stereo for the US market. The mono version of the album was released internationally in 2009 as part of the Beatles in Mono box set.) In addition, Harrison's guitar is more prominent in the mono mix.

== Release and reception ==
Apple Records, the Beatles' EMI-distributed record label, released The Beatles on 22 November 1968, with "Piggies" sequenced as the fourth track on side two of the double LP. It appeared between two other songs with animal names in their titles – "Blackbird" and "Rocky Raccoon". The animal-themed sequencing was a deliberate decision on the part of Lennon and McCartney, who prepared the running order of the album's 30 tracks, with Martin, after Harrison had left for Los Angeles to work with Apple signing Jackie Lomax.

[W]ith "Piggies" Harrison turns from the spirit to the flesh, to sling some caustic barbs at a greedy and materialistic Establishment. 1968 – the year of Daley's convention [in Chicago], Nixon's election, and unprecedented numbers of student anti-Vietnam War demonstrations – was a time when any representative of "the system," particularly a politician or a policeman, was fated to automatically take on the guise of a "pig" in the view of much of the counterculture.

— Nicholas Schaffner, 1977

According to author Mark Hertsgaard, "Piggies" "[kept] the Beatles' countercultural flame alive", as the song was embraced as an anti-authoritarian anthem by the counterculture, following a year of protests and civil unrest in many Western countries. Among many such events in the United States, police officers clashed violently with anti-Vietnam War demonstrators at the Democratic National Convention in Chicago in August 1968. (Note: In one of the more peaceful demonstrations during the Chicago convention, Yippie activists led by Jerry Rubin held a press conference to announce an alternative presidential nomination, in the form of a pig named Pigasus. The activists maintained that Pigasus was a more appealing choice than the existing candidates.) David A. Noebel, an American arch-conservative, paired the song with "Back in the U.S.S.R." when he accused the Beatles of being pro-Communist and leading a move towards revolutionary socialism with the White Album. Along with McCartney's "Rocky Raccoon", however, "Piggies" was also criticised by the radical New Left as an example of the Beatles resorting to whimsical parody instead of directly addressing contemporary issues.

Among the more conservative elements of the British establishment and the public, the release of The Beatles coincided with a less tolerant attitude towards the band. On 19 October, two days after the 24-hour session to sequence the album, Lennon, along with Yoko Ono, was arrested for possession of cannabis; Lennon described the bust as a "set-up" by the London Drug Squad. (Note: Together with his wife, Pattie Boyd, Harrison was arrested on the same charges by the same officer, Norman Pilcher, in March 1969. This targeting of the Beatles contrasted with the privileges they had previously received, as MBEs, such as when, in February 1967, the Drug Squad waited until Harrison and Boyd had departed from a party at Keith Richards' house in Sussex before arresting members of the Rolling Stones and their entourage.) During a radio interview shortly afterwards, in Los Angeles, Harrison questioned the local police department's motto "To serve and protect" when asked about the criminality of smoking marijuana. In mid November, he represented the Beatles on The Smothers Brothers Comedy Hour, which was in conflict at the time with the CBS television network over its political satire and regularly subjected to censorship. Author John Winn describes Harrison's guest appearance as "an important show of support" following Richard Nixon's recent US election win. (Note: Harrison encouraged the Smothers Brothers on air with the comment, "Whether you can say it or not, keep trying to say it.")

Writing in the International Times, Barry Miles found "Piggies" "unsubtle" and likely to appeal to "those involved with Chicago's pig-police". William Mann of The Times noted the recurring nature theme throughout the album, from brief mentions of monkeys, lizards, elephants and tigers, to song titles such as "Blackbird" and "Piggies", and asked of Harrison's characters: "are they Chicago police or just company directors?" Melody Maker's Alan Walsh admired the instrumentation on the recording and deemed "Piggies" to be "The Beatles' satire track ... a kick at upper-class reactionaries or journalists (or both)". In his unfavourable review of the White Album, in The New York Times, Mike Jahn considered that many of the tracks were "either so corny or sung in such a way that it is hard to tell whether [the Beatles] are being serious", among which the words of Harrison's song served as "an act of lyrical overstatement".

Record Mirror remarked that the birdsong effects of "Blackbird" were replaced by "snorts and grunts" on "Piggies", which the reviewer described as "a society beef (or pork if you like)" in the style of folk singer Roy Harper. Writing in Rolling Stone, Jann Wenner considered the song to be "an amazing choice to follow 'Blackbird'", given the contrast between the two pieces – "'Blackbird' so encouraging, 'Piggies' so smug (though accurate: 'what they need's a damn good whacking'). Ha!" Wenner paired it with Starr's "Don't Pass Me By", as lesser tracks beside the "superb numbers" found elsewhere on the album, but added that "on their own, they're totally groovy." Alan Smith of the NME praised the melody and the use of classical instrumentation, and described the song as "a telling piece about modern life" and "a fascinating piece of humorous cynicism". (Note: Smith also referred to "Piggies" when, having derided Lennon's "Revolution 9" as representing the album's "bad and ugly" elements, he wrote: "For most of the rest, God Bless You, Beatles! Thank you for Rocky and his Gideon Bible, and George's oink-oink piggies, and the blackbirds singing ...")

== Charles Manson interpretation ==
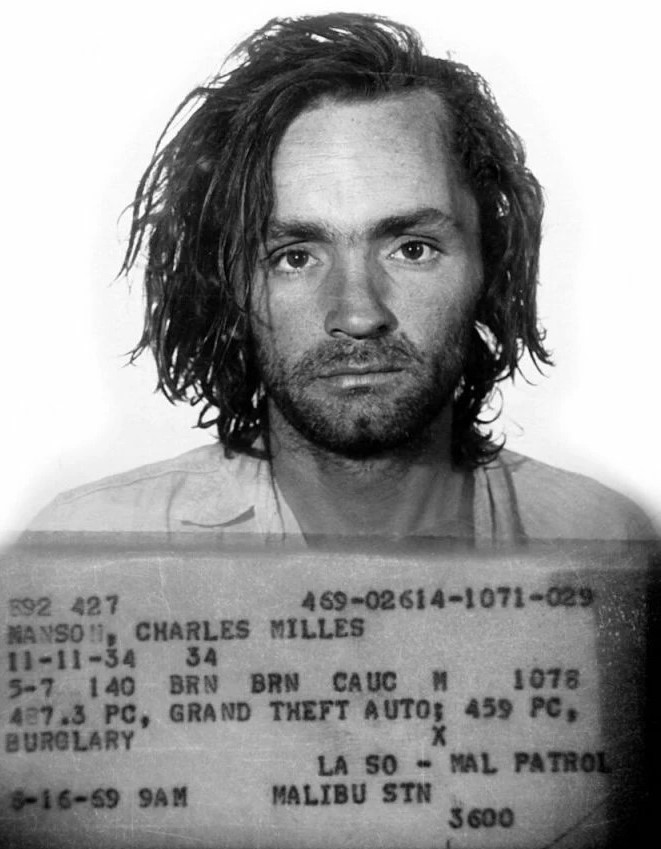
Mugshot of Manson taken in 1969

Musician and cult leader Charles Manson interpreted several songs on The Beatles as an inducement for his followers, known as the Manson Family, to carry out a series of murders in Los Angeles in August 1969. Inspired by the line "What they need's a damn good whacking", Manson adopted "Piggies" as one of the tracks to justify such attacks on the White bourgeoisie. (Note: The same line was a favourite of Manson's and frequently quoted by him before his incarceration.) Believing that the Beatles were instructing him through their music, Manson envisioned these attacks as the prelude to an apocalyptic racial war between the establishment and the Black community that would leave him and his followers to rule America on counterculture principles. At the scenes of the murders of Sharon Tate, Leno and Rosemary LaBianca, Gary Hinman and others, the words "Political Piggy", "Pig" and "Death to Pigs" were written on the walls with the victims' blood. In the case of Leno LaBianca, items of cutlery were inserted into his body in reference to the lyric "Clutching forks and knives to eat their bacon".

Everybody was getting on the big Beatle bandwagon. The police and the promoters and the Lord Mayors – and murderers too ... It was upsetting to be associated with something so sleazy as Charles Manson.

— George Harrison in The Beatles Anthology (2000)

Speaking to Rolling Stone co-founder David Dalton before his trial, Manson also drew parallels between the pig noises that close the track and a similar sound, followed by machine-gun fire, that appears in Lennon's White Album sound collage "Revolution 9". Like its rival counterculture publications Los Angeles Free Press and Tuesday's Child, Rolling Stone initially supported Manson, Dalton contending that it was a case of the conservative-minded authorities framing "some poor hippie guru". According to author Steve Turner, "Piggies" "became notorious" as a result of the Manson Family's 1971 murder trial, which was successfully prosecuted by Los Angeles County Deputy District Attorney Vincent Bugliosi.

Harrison was appalled at Manson's interpretation of the song. (Note: In I, Me, Mine, Harrison says of the "damn good whacking" line: "It needed to rhyme with 'backing', 'lacking', and had absolutely nothing to do with American policemen or Californian shagnasties!") He also found it disturbing that Manson came to define the long-haired hippie type in the public's eyes, after the prosecution's case had resulted in widespread condemnation of rock music and the idealism associated with the late 1960s hippie movement. In his 1974 book Helter Skelter, Bugliosi says he was denied permission to quote from the lyrics of "Piggies" in the book, yet not so for relevant Lennon–McCartney songs, such as "Helter Skelter", "Revolution 1" and "Blackbird".

The connection between Manson's interpretation of the White Album songs and the August 1969 murders was introduced by Bugliosi in Manson's trial. Mike McGann, the lead police investigator on the Tate-LaBianca murders later stated: "Everything in Vince Bugliosi's book is wrong. I was the lead investigator on the case. Bugliosi didn't solve it. Nobody trusted him." Police detective Charlie Guenther, who investigated the murders, and Bugliosi's co-prosecutor Aaron Stovits have also discredited this as the motive for the murders.

== Retrospective assessment and legacy ==
Writing in 1977, Nicholas Schaffner said that, despite the "merciless stereotypes" presented in its lyrics, "Piggies" and Harrison's three other White Album compositions "firmly established him as a contender" beside the Beatles' principal songwriters, Lennon and McCartney. Four years later, Philip Norman described the song as "mordantly humorous". Among more recent Beatles biographers, Ian MacDonald views "Piggies" as a "bludgeoning satire on straight society", dismissing it as "dreadful" and "an embarrassing blot on [Harrison's] discography". (Note: In his 2003 review of The Beatles, for Mojo magazine, MacDonald derided the track further, calling it "a nasty piece of work, the only song on the White Album which Charles Manson didn't completely misinterpret".)

According to author Doyle Greene, writing in his 2016 book on the 1960s counterculture, the Beatles and Manson are "permanently connected in pop-culture consciousness" as a result of Manson having founded his theory of race war on McCartney's "Helter Skelter", "Piggies" and other tracks from the 1968 double album. In his book Revolution: The Making of the Beatles' White Album, David Quantick recognises the song's musical qualities – describing it as "a powerful song, full of angry climaxes" with "a fine [vocal] performance ... [and] a charming baroque feel" – yet he bemoans its "arrogant" and misanthropic message. (Note: According to author and critic Richie Unterberger, whereas "Piggies" was "cloaked in gentleness" on Harrison's Esher demo, the song received a "far more acerbic studio arrangement", in which "strings and harpsichord give it a hard kick in the backside.") Quantick concludes: "Although the Beatles preached peace and love and meant it, large parts of the White Album indicate that they could be a bit selective about it." Ian Inglis considers that the intentions behind Harrison's send-up of capitalist consumerism were reasonable, and acknowledges the sinister connotations that the song gained through Manson. He says that the track fails, however, melodically and lyrically, and lacks cohesion in its musical arrangement as well as "any subtlety or charm".

Reviewing Harrison's career in a 2002 issue of Goldmine magazine, Dave Thompson termed "Piggies" "whimsically foreboding" and grouped it with late-period Beatles songs such as "Something" and "Long, Long, Long" that anticipated Harrison's successes as a solo artist after the group's break-up in 1970. Tim Riley describes the song's narrative as "smug anti-elitism outdone only by the dourness of John's 'Glass Onion' and 'Sexy Sadie'". With regard to George Martin's contention that The Beatles should have been edited down to a single disc, however, he views "Piggies" as one of the White Album "essentials" contributed by Harrison, along with "While My Guitar Gently Weeps" and "Savoy Truffle". (Note: In his attempt to reduce the 1968 release to a single LP, on the occasion of the album's 40th anniversary, Mark Caro of the Chicago Tribune similarly included "Piggies", as well as "While My Guitar Gently Weeps" and "Long, Long, Long".)

Among reviewers of the 2009 remastered album, Sean Highkin of Beats Per Minute cites the track as evidence that, despite the disharmonious atmosphere within the group during 1968, "All four Beatles were working at their highest levels", with Harrison "at his most acerbic on 'Piggies'". Mark Richardson of Pitchfork highlights the song as one of The Beatles' "iffy jokes" that nevertheless succeed, due to the high standard of the band's songwriting and the effective sequencing of the double album. Coinciding with the 50th anniversary of its release, Jacob Stolworthy of The Independent listed "Piggies" at number 14 in his ranking of the White Album's 30 tracks. He admired the harpsichord passage as a "highlight" of the album and wrote: "On first listen, 'Piggies' is too strange to enjoy. Once its Orwellian nature is embraced, however, it becomes a joyous two fingers in the face of establishment told by Harrison in baroque pop form." AllMusic writer Stephen Thomas Erlewine, commenting on The Beatles as a whole, described "Piggies" as a "silly" song that nonetheless demonstrates Harrison's development as a songwriter, along with his other contributions to the album.

== Other versions ==
Theo Bikel, an actor, folk singer and activist who was a delegate at the 1968 Democratic convention in Chicago, covered "Piggies" on his 1969 album A New Day. Reviewing the opening night of Bikel's residency at the Troubadour in Los Angeles, in June 1970, Billboard magazine described the song as one of "the more meaningful titles" that the singer had adopted from the work of popular acts such as the Beatles, the Rolling Stones and Donovan. The 1976 television adaptation of Vincent Bugliosi's book, also titled Helter Skelter, features several Beatles songs, including "Piggies" and Harrison's White Album track "Long, Long, Long", both performed by the group Silverspoon. The song was also covered by Danbert Nobacon, lead singer of the anarcho-punk band Chumbawamba. Titled "Piggies in Revolution 9", Nobacon's version appeared on the 1989 album Fuck EMI, a multi-artist compilation protesting EMI's business practices, particularly the company's involvement in cruise missile production.

Having become available on bootleg albums from 1991 onwards, Harrison's 1968 demo was released on the Beatles' Anthology 3 compilation in October 1996. Recorded on an Ampex four-track recorder, the demo features Harrison playing two acoustic guitar parts, and a double-tracked lead vocal. Harrison performed "Piggies" throughout his 1991 Japanese tour with Eric Clapton and at his Natural Law Party concert in London in April 1992. With synthesizers replicating the classical arrangement, a version recorded at the Tokyo Dome on 15 December 1991 appears on Harrison's Live in Japan double album.

Phish included "Piggies" in their performance of The Beatles on Halloween 1994, which was released in 2002 as Live Phish Volume 13. The harpsichord from the original Beatles recording was mashed with Jay-Z's "Change Clothes" for a track on Danger Mouse's The Grey Album in 2004. For the Beatles' 2006 remix album Love, compiled by Martin and his son Giles, the harpsichord and cello parts were mixed into the ending of "Strawberry Fields Forever".

The song was covered by Pumajaw for The White Album Recovered, a CD distributed with the September 2008 issue of Mojo magazine. That same year, former Cars keyboardist Greg Hawkes issued a ukulele rendition on his album The Beatles Uke.

== Personnel ==
According to Ian MacDonald, except where noted:

The Beatles

- George Harrison – lead and harmony vocals, acoustic guitar, backing vocals, vocalised grunting
- John Lennon – tape effects, vocalised grunting, backing vocals
- Paul McCartney – bass, backing vocals
- Ringo Starr – tambourine, bass drum

Additional musicians

- Chris Thomas – harpsichord
- Henry Datyner – violin
- Eric Bowie – violin
- Norman Lederman – violin
- Ronald Thomas – violin
- John Underwood – viola
- Keith Cummings – viola
- Eldon Fox – cello
- Reginald Kilby – cello
- George Martin – string arrangement

== Sources ==
- The Beatles (2000). The Beatles Anthology. San Francisco, CA: Chronicle Books. ISBN 0-8118-2684-8.
- Bugliosi, Vincent; with Gentry, Curt (1994). Helter Skelter: The True Story of the Manson Murders. New York, NY: W.W. Norton. ISBN 0-393-08700-X.
- Case, George (2010). Out of Our Heads: Rock 'n' Roll Before the Drugs Wore Off. Milwaukee, WI: Backbeat Books. ISBN 978-0-8793-0967-1.
- Clayson, Alan (2003). George Harrison. London: Sanctuary. ISBN 1-86074-489-3.
- Doggett, Peter (2007). There's a Riot Going On: Revolutionaries, Rock Stars, and the Rise and Fall of '60s Counter-Culture. Edinburgh, UK: Canongate Books. ISBN 978-1-84195-940-5.
- Everett, Walter (1999). The Beatles as Musicians: Revolver Through the Anthology. New York, NY: Oxford University Press. ISBN 0-19-512941-5.
- Gould, Jonathan (2007). Can't Buy Me Love: The Beatles, Britain and America. London: Piatkus. ISBN 978-0-7499-2988-6.
- Greene, Doyle (2016). Rock, Counterculture and the Avant-Garde, 1966–1970: How the Beatles, Frank Zappa and the Velvet Underground Defined an Era. Jefferson, NC: McFarland. ISBN 978-1-4766-6214-5.
- Greene, Joshua M. (2006). Here Comes the Sun: The Spiritual and Musical Journey of George Harrison. Hoboken, NJ: John Wiley & Sons. ISBN 978-0-470-12780-3.
- Guesdon, Jean-Michel; Margotin, Philippe (2013). All the Songs: The Story Behind Every Beatles Release. New York, NY: Black Dog & Leventhal. ISBN 978-1-57912-952-1.
- Harrison, George (2002). I, Me, Mine. San Francisco, CA: Chronicle Books. ISBN 978-0-8118-5900-4.
- Harry, Bill (2003). The George Harrison Encyclopedia. London: Virgin Books. ISBN 978-0-7535-0822-0.
- Hertsgaard, Mark (1996). A Day in the Life: The Music and Artistry of the Beatles. London: Pan Books. ISBN 0-330-33891-9.
- Huntley, Elliot J. (2006). Mystical One: George Harrison – After the Break-up of the Beatles. Toronto, ON: Guernica Editions. ISBN 1-55071-197-0.
- Inglis, Ian (2009). "Revolution". In Womack, Kenneth (ed.). The Cambridge Companion to the Beatles. Cambridge, UK: Cambridge University Press. ISBN 978-0-521-68976-2.
- Inglis, Ian (2010). The Words and Music of George Harrison. Santa Barbara, CA: Praeger. ISBN 978-0-313-37532-3.
- Lachman, Gary (2001). Turn Off Your Mind: The Mystic Sixties and the Dark Side of the Age of Aquarius. New York, NY: The Disinformation Company. ISBN 0-9713942-3-7.
- Leng, Simon (2006). While My Guitar Gently Weeps: The Music of George Harrison. Milwaukee, WI: Hal Leonard. ISBN 978-1-4234-0609-9.
- Lewisohn, Mark (2005) [1988]. The Complete Beatles Recording Sessions: The Official Story of the Abbey Road Years 1962–1970. London: Bounty Books. ISBN 978-0-7537-2545-0.
- MacDonald, Ian (1998). Revolution in the Head: The Beatles' Records and the Sixties. London: Pimlico. ISBN 978-0-7126-6697-8.
- Madinger, Chip; Easter, Mark (2000). Eight Arms to Hold You: The Solo Beatles Compendium. Chesterfield, MO: 44.1 Productions. ISBN 0-615-11724-4.
- Miles, Barry (2001). The Beatles Diary Volume 1: The Beatles Years. London: Omnibus Press. ISBN 0-7119-8308-9.
- Mojo Special Limited Edition: 1000 Days of Revolution (The Beatles' Final Years – Jan 1, 1968 to Sept 27, 1970). London: Emap. 2003.
- Norman, Philip (1996) [1981]. Shout!: The Beatles in Their Generation. New York, NY: Fireside. ISBN 0-684-83067-1.
- O'Neill, Tom (2019). Chaos: Charles Manson, the CIA, and the Secret History of the Sixties. New York, NY: Little, Brown. ISBN 978-0-316-47757-4. Archived from the original on 6 June 2021.
- Pedler, Dominic (2003). The Songwriting Secrets of the Beatles. London: Omnibus Press. ISBN 978-0-7119-8167-6.
- Quantick, David (2002). Revolution: The Making of the Beatles' White Album. Chicago, IL: A Cappella Books. ISBN 1-55652-470-6.
- Riley, Tim (2002) [1988]. Tell Me Why – The Beatles: Album by Album, Song by Song, the Sixties and After. Cambridge, MA: Da Capo Press. ISBN 978-0-306-81120-3.
- Schaffner, Nicholas (1978). The Beatles Forever. New York, NY: McGraw-Hill. ISBN 0-07-055087-5.
- Strong, Martin C. (2010). The Great Folk Discography, Vol. 1: Pioneers and Early Legends. Edinburgh, UK: Polygon Books. ISBN 978-1-84697-141-9.
- Turner, Steve (1999). A Hard Day's Write: The Stories Behind Every Beatles Song (2nd edn). New York, NY: Carlton/HarperCollins. ISBN 0-06-273698-1.
- Unterberger, Richie (2006). The Unreleased Beatles: Music & Film. San Francisco, CA: Backbeat Books. ISBN 978-0-87930-892-6.
- Wiener, Jon (1991). Come Together: John Lennon in His Time. Urbana, IL: University of Illinois Press. ISBN 978-0-252-06131-8.
- Winn, John C. (2009). That Magic Feeling: The Beatles' Recorded Legacy, Volume Two, 1966–1970. New York, NY: Three Rivers Press. ISBN 978-0-307-45239-9.
- Womack, Kenneth (2014). The Beatles Encyclopedia: Everything Fab Four. Santa Barbara, CA: ABC-CLIO. ISBN 978-0-313-39171-2.
