= Old Brown Shoe =

1969 single by the Beatles

- US picture sleeve (reverse)

Single by the Beatles
- A-side: "The Ballad of John and Yoko"
- Released: 30 May 1969
- Recorded: 16 & 18 April 1969
- Studio: EMI, London
- Genre: Rock
- Length: 3:16
- Label: Apple
- Songwriter: George Harrison
- Producer: George Martin

The Beatles singles chronology
"Get Back" (1969)	"The Ballad of John and Yoko" / "Old Brown Shoe" (1969)	"Something" / "Come Together" (1969)

"Old Brown Shoe" is a song by the English rock band the Beatles. Written by George Harrison, the group's lead guitarist, it was released on a non-album single in May 1969, as the B-side to "The Ballad of John and Yoko". The song was subsequently included on the band's compilation albums Hey Jude, 1967–1970 and Past Masters, Volume Two. Although "Old Brown Shoe" remains a relatively obscure song in the band's catalogue, several music critics view it as one of Harrison's best compositions from the Beatles era and especially admire his guitar solo on the track.

The lyrics to "Old Brown Shoe" address the concept of duality while its rhythm is partly in the ska style. The Beatles rehearsed the song during the sessions for their Let It Be album in January 1969. Harrison subsequently taped a solo demo of the song, along with two other compositions that the band had overlooked: "Something" and "All Things Must Pass". The group formally recorded "Old Brown Shoe" in April, during the early sessions for Abbey Road.

The 1969 demo was released on the Beatles' Anthology 3 compilation in 1996. A concert version by Harrison was included on his 1992 album Live in Japan. Gary Brooker performed the song at the Concert for George tribute in November 2002, held at London's Royal Albert Hall a year after Harrison's death.

== Background and inspiration ==
I started the chord sequences on the piano (which I don't really play) and then began writing ideas for the words from various opposites: I want a love that's right / But right is only half of what's wrong. Again, it's the duality of things – yes-no, up-down, left-right, right-wrong, etc.

— George Harrison, 1980

George Harrison wrote "Old Brown Shoe" in January 1969 on a piano rather than guitar, his main instrument. The song's rhythm suggests the influence of ska. In his 1980 autobiography, I, Me, Mine, Harrison says that the lyrical content started as a study in opposites and addresses "the duality of things". This idea was also prevalent in the Beatles' 1967 single "Hello, Goodbye", which Paul McCartney had written as an exercise in word association. For Harrison, the concept of duality also appealed on a philosophical level, consistent with his interest in Eastern religion. Neil Aspinall, the Beatles' assistant, later recalled Harrison employing the metaphysical theme of opposites to disperse some Hells Angels who had taken up residence in the Beatles' Apple headquarters over Christmas 1968 and refused to leave. (Note: According to Aspinall, Harrison told the Hells Angels: "Well, you know, there's yin–yang, in–out, up–down ... you're here – you go." Aspinall added: "And they said, 'Okay' – and went!") According to theologian Dale Allison, "Old Brown Shoe" is a further reflection of Harrison's interest in "dualities and contradictions", but stated in terms that avoid the religiosity evident in much of his songwriting.

Before returning to England for Christmas, Harrison spent time with Bob Dylan and the Band in upstate New York. The visit allowed Harrison to experience a musical camaraderie that had been absent in the Beatles over much of 1968, and inspired him as he emerged as a prolific songwriter. Author and critic Ian MacDonald identifies the "hood-eyed spirit" of Dylan in the song's "dusty shuffle-beat" and ironic lyrics, while recognising the "surprising and graphic" chord progression as typical of Harrison's work. Author Alan Clayson also detects a Dylan influence in the rhythm, which he calls a "'Highway 61 Revisited' chug".

== Composition ==
"Old Brown Shoe" is in the key of C major, although its chords also suggest the latter's relative minor key, A minor. The time signature is 4/4 throughout. Following a four-bar introduction, the song's structure comprises two verses, a bridge, an instrumental verse, followed by a second bridge, a final verse and the outro.

The verse employs blues-inflected C7 and D7 chords (or I7 and II7 chords in Roman numeral analysis) before an increase in harmonic movement is marked by changes to F, A♭, F, E augmented and A minor. The verses avoid the expected plagal cadence by resolving with the relative minor chord rather than I7. In achieving this via the augmented chord, a C note resonates through the final changes, a device that musicologist Dominic Pedler cites among the Beatles' most effective uses of augmented chords. The bridge is structured in familiar 1960s rock fashion with its reliance on V and IV (G and F) chords. The section again resolves unusually, however; rather than using the expected D7 chord before exiting with a return to G, a disguised imperfect cadence is achieved through a dissonant iv♯ diminished chord (F♯dim7) before the final V chord. Among other musicologists' assessments, Walter Everett considers that the composition's "A/C duality" fits well with Harrison's lyrical theme, while Alan Pollack highlights the flat VI (A♭) chord in the verse and the frequent bluesy flat 3rd and 7th notes alongside the I7 chords.

Music critic Tim Riley says the lyrics represent "a witty and oblique look at love, delivered with sardonic flair", as typified by the opening verse: "I want a love that's right / Right is only half of what's wrong / I want a short-haired girl / Who sometimes wears it twice as long". He views the reference to "wear[ing] rings on every finger" as a nod to Ringo Starr. The song's title is referred to only as an item that the singer declares he is "stepping out" of. According to music journalist Graham Reid, "Old Brown Shoe" reflects Harrison's growing confidence as a songwriter. He interprets the message as the guitarist "straining against the constraints of the Beatles ('the zoo'?)" during a period when, as the lyrics state, he himself was "changing faster than the weather".

== Recording ==
=== Let It Be rehearsals and Harrison demo ===
The Beatles rehearsed "Old Brown Shoe" several times over three days, beginning on 27 January 1969, during the Let It Be sessions at Apple Studio in London. Harrison still played piano on the song and the lyrics were complete. The run-throughs on 28 January included contributions from guest keyboardist Billy Preston, who supplied fills on Hammond organ. In the documentary The Beatles: Get Back, Preston can also be seen playing a six-string bass while McCartney plays Harrison's Fender Telecaster upside-down. The tapes from that day show John Lennon struggling with the guitar part; in Everett's description, his playing suggests he was "stymied or disinterested". (Note: In their study of the Twickenham and Apple Studio tapes that led to the Let It Be album and film, Doug Sulpy and Ray Schweighardt comment that in response to Lennon's substandard playing and his complaints about the abundance of chords, Harrison suggested that Preston should play piano so that he could play guitar instead of Lennon. Offended by this, according to Sulpy and Schweighardt, Lennon started up the song again but once more "offer[ed] inept accompaniment".) At this point, Starr had devised a drum pattern on the off-beat. The band gave considerable time to the song but chose not to record it for the album.

Harrison made a solo demo of the song at EMI Studios (subsequently Abbey Road Studios), featuring piano and vocal, and two overdubbed electric guitar parts. The session took place on 25 February, his 26th birthday, and also included solo recordings of "Something" and "All Things Must Pass", which were similarly overlooked for inclusion on Let It Be. Harrison played these versions of "Old Brown Shoe" and "Something" to Joe Cocker, who accepted Harrison's offer to record the latter song. (Note: In a 1982 interview, Cocker recalled the meeting with Harrison: "I was really taken aback at how brilliant he was, 'cause he just played such simple chords and made a tune around them. And he gave me 'Old Brown Shoe' to work with – I never did anything with it, though.") Author Simon Leng describes "Old Brown Shoe" as "the most complete in conception" of the three demos, with an arrangement that contains several of the main elements present in the Beatles' subsequent recording. The demos were released on the band's 1996 outtakes compilation Anthology 3.

=== Official band version ===
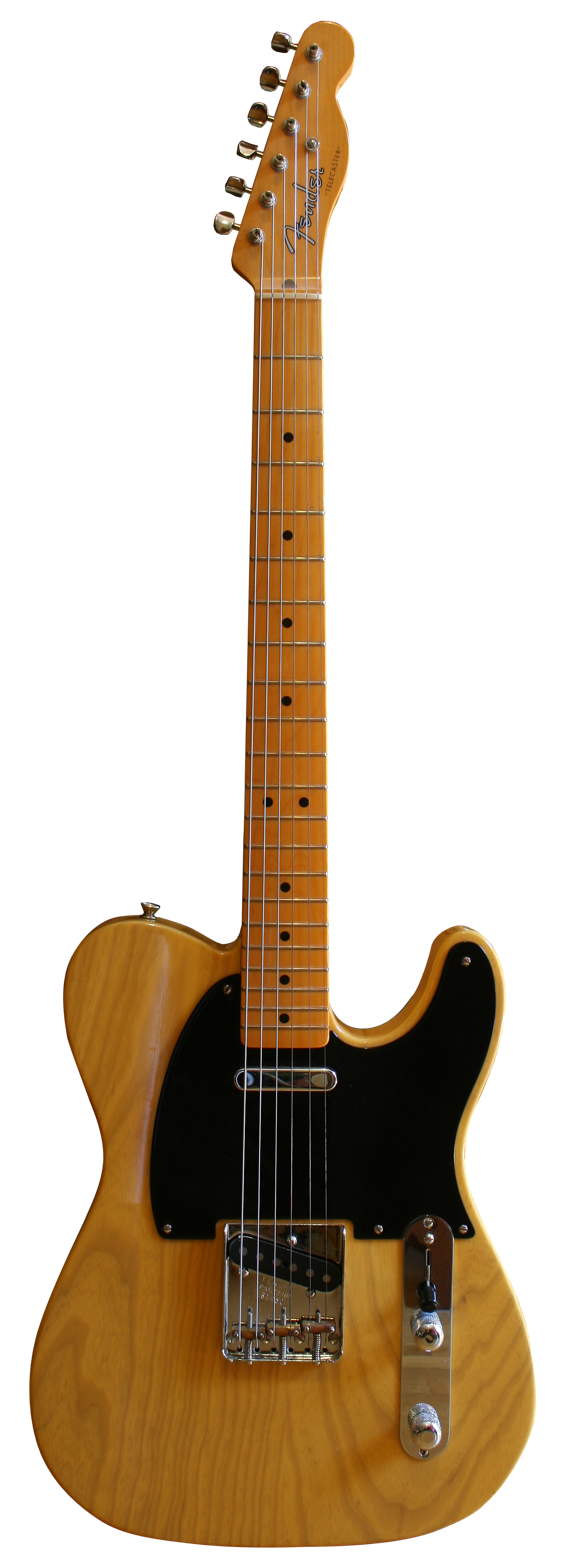
A 1952 Fender Telecaster. Harrison recorded his guitar parts on a Telecaster given to him by the Fender company in mid 1968.

The Beatles revisited "Old Brown Shoe" when they were in need of a B-side for their next single, "The Ballad of John and Yoko", Lennon's account of his and Yoko Ono's recent wedding and honeymoon. The song's recording took place on 16 and 18 April 1969, during the early sessions for the band's Abbey Road album. The 16 April session was the first at EMI Studios for the full group since October the previous year, when they completed recording for their self-titled double album (also known as the "White Album"), and was given over entirely to songs written by Harrison. (Note: Only Lennon and McCartney attended the session for "The Ballad of John and Yoko", which was hastily organised at EMI on 14 April.) The line-up on the basic track was Lennon or McCartney on guitar, Harrison on tack piano, and Starr on drums. Four takes were needed to achieve a satisfactory performance. Beatles historian Mark Lewisohn comments on the band's tight ensemble playing, evident from the studio tapes, and how focused each musician sounds in his contribution. (Note: Like Lewisohn, MacDonald and authors John Winn, Bruce Spizer, Andy Babiuk and Kenneth Womack each give a line-up that includes Starr on drums and McCartney on piano. In the liner notes to the 2019 Abbey Road Super Deluxe Edition, however, Kevin Howlett states that Starr was away filming The Magic Christian for at least some of the 16 April takes, and that McCartney played drums in his absence.)

Clayson recognises the "undercurrent of bottleneck" in Lennon or McCartney's main guitar riff as anticipating Harrison's slide guitar style, a technique he first embraced in December 1969 while on tour with Delaney & Bonnie and Friends.

The unusual bass sound over the song's bridges was achieved by tracking the bass with the lead guitar, replicating the bass line that Harrison had played on his demo. Everett states that it was McCartney's Fender Jazz Bass doubled with Harrison's Telecaster, both playing chromatically moving arpeggiations in a similar manner to the bridge guitars in "And Your Bird Can Sing". In a 1987 interview for Creem magazine, however, Harrison recalled that he was the bass guitarist on the track, rather than McCartney. When the interviewer, J. Kordosh, suggested that the bass part "sounds like McCartney was going nuts again", Harrison replied: "That was me going nuts. I’m doing [on the bass] exactly what I do on the guitar."

Harrison recorded his lead vocal in a corner of the studio, to capture a natural reverberation from the room. The backing vocals were sung by Lennon and McCartney. Also present during the vocal overdubs were the Aerovons, an American band who had based their sound and image on the Beatles, and had come to London to record at EMI. Tom Hartman, the Aerovons' singer and guitarist, recalled that the Beatles attempted the line "Who knows, baby, you may comfort me" countless times, trying to perfect their performance. According to author Elliot Huntley, after Lennon had made derogatory remarks about Harrison's songwriting in January, he now sounded "audibly excited" by "Old Brown Shoe" in his "enthusiastic and energetic backing vocals" on the song. (Note: Lennon ridiculed "I Me Mine", particularly its waltz time signature. His own songwriting output was minimal during the Let It Be sessions, whereas Harrison offered over ten new songs. In Huntley's view, Lennon's enthusiasm on the "Old Brown Shoe" recording "sound[s] as though he wished he'd written the song himself".) The Beatles devoted the rest of the session to taping a basic track for "Something", although it was later discarded as the band chose to record a new version the following month.

Harrison's guitar solo from "Old Brown Shoe", April 1969
Ian MacDonald described it as a "tightly-structured solo with an American flavour to its final bars".

Harrison completed the "Old Brown Shoe" recording alone on 18 April. He first overdubbed a guitar solo that Everett describes as "stinging" and "highly Claptonesque", played on a Telecaster with the sound coloured through a Leslie speaker and given automatic double tracking (ADT) treatment and "sent wild to both channels". Harrison then added a Hammond organ part, replacing Lennon's rhythm guitar contribution from the previous session. Although Chris Thomas supervised the 18 April overdubbing session, George Martin was credited as the song's sole producer. (Note: While not credited as such by EMI, the Beatles essentially self-produced their sessions by 1969.)

== Release ==
In a 1980 interview, Lennon said that he was responsible for the choice of "Old Brown Shoe" as the B-side of "The Ballad of John and Yoko". The single was released in the United Kingdom (as Apple R 5786) on 30 May 1969 and in the United States (as Apple 2531) on 4 June. It marked the second time that a Harrison composition had been included on a Beatles single in the UK or the US, following "The Inner Light" in March 1968, although his song "While My Guitar Gently Weeps" had also been the B-side of "Ob-La-Di, Ob-La-Da", a single culled from the White Album and issued in most countries other than the UK and the US. (Note: Lennon later pushed to have "Something" released as a single from Abbey Road, thereby giving Harrison his first Beatles A-side.) In the UK, the song increased the public's recognition of Harrison as a songwriter, after "Badge", which he co-wrote with Eric Clapton, had been a hit single for Cream that spring and established him as a composer outside the Beatles.

In the US, Apple Records issued the record in a picture sleeve featuring shots of the four Beatles and Ono in the garden of McCartney's London home. On the reverse side of the sleeve, the photo included a dark brown shoe placed in a bush in front of the five figures. In the opinion of author Bruce Spizer, this shot, taken by Linda McCartney, shows Harrison, McCartney and Starr in better humour than in the shot used on the front of the sleeve, where the three bandmates appear uncomfortable with having to pose behind Ono and Lennon.

While the A-side's chart performance in the US was hindered by a radio ban, due to the song's allegedly blasphemous lyrics, "Old Brown Shoe" failed to place on any of the three charts there. It was listed with "The Ballad of John and Yoko", as a double A-side, when the single topped Australia's Go-Set National Top 40.

"Old Brown Shoe" was issued on an LP for the first time in February 1970 when it was included on the North American release Hey Jude. The first global album to include "Old Brown Shoe" was the 1973 compilation 1967–1970. Following the standardisation of the Beatles' catalogue for compact disc in 1987, the first CD version was issued in 1988 on the Past Masters, Volume Two compilation.

== Critical reception and legacy ==
Ian MacDonald admires "Old Brown Shoe" as one of its author's "most forceful pieces" and "an archetypal B-side from an era when B-sides were worth flipping a single for". Walter Everett says the voice leading and harmony on "Old Brown Shoe" are "far more subtle and interesting" than such qualities in "The Ballad of John and Yoko", and views its dualistic theme as "more interesting" than McCartney's lyrics in "Hello, Goodbye". Tim Riley deems the song "at least as good a rocker as 'Savoy Truffle'" and, like "The Inner Light", an example of the Beatles continuing their tradition of offering high-quality and musically diverse B-sides. He describes Harrison's guitar solo as "daring" and a performance that "rises and falls with astonishing fluidity and control".

Despite its inclusion on some of their compilation albums, "Old Brown Shoe" has remained a comparative rarity in the band's catalogue. Writing for Rolling Stone in 2002, Greg Kot described it as "dark, droll, rollicking" and arguably Harrison's "most underrated Beatles composition". (Note: Dominic Pedler also finds the song "highly underrated" and says it features "some typically inspired Harrison-esque sleight-of-hand, courtesy again of the augmented chord". He groups the track with McCartney's "Fixing a Hole" and Lennon's "I'm So Tired" as the "textbook trio" of Beatles songs that employ augmented chords and show the composers "at the very height of their songwriting powers".) In his overview of Harrison's career for Goldmine that same year, Dave Thompson said that "Old Brown Shoe" was one of five Harrison-written songs that "rank among the finest Beatles compositions of the group's final years". Conversely, Richie Unterberger of AllMusic deems it "one of the less memorable late-'60s Beatles outings", citing its obscure lyrics and lack of a catchy riff in the usual Beatles style, although he finds this last quality partly redeemed in the bass playing and guitar solo.

Simon Leng cites the track's appearance as a B-side to the Lennon–McCartney composition as indicative of Harrison's predicament during the last year of the Beatles' career, since:

In any other band, this upbeat boogie that matched lyrical sophistication with another outstanding guitar break would have taken precedence over the rough, self-serving travelogue that was "The Ballad of John and Yoko". Harrison's song works on any level, in any context, while the Lennon piece could only have relevance within the Beatles' self-referential sphere ... This kind of glaring anomaly forced George Harrison out of the Beatles.

Writing for Rough Guides, Chris Ingham recognises "Old Brown Shoe" as "perhaps the densest, sharpest Harrison song to make it onto a Beatles record". In his review of Anthology 3 for Mojo in 1996, Ingham admired Harrison's "focussed demo work", adding: "Fighting harder for album space consideration [than Lennon and McCartney], the spirit on his demos throughout this period is wonderful, the songs shining vividly through. The stripped-down, beautifully sung 'Old Brown Shoe', 'Something' and 'All Things Must Pass' ... nearly steal the show with their simplicity and confidence. The sound of a man quietly getting into his stride."

Joe Bosso of MusicRadar includes "Old Brown Shoe" among Harrison's "10 Greatest Beatles Songs", describing it as "An infectious, lively track that tumbles out of the gate (check out Ringo's raucous drumming) and gallops off." He also highlights Harrison's "blazing guitar solo" and says that, with his guitar, bass and organ contributions, the recording is "practically all-George". The editors of Guitar World rank "Old Brown Shoe" at number 28 in their list of "The Beatles' 50 Greatest Guitar Moments". They describe the solo as "stinging" in the style of Clapton and rate the track among Harrison's best songs, yet one that was "dishonorably relegated" to the B-side of "The Ballad of John and Yoko".

== Live version and posthumous tributes ==
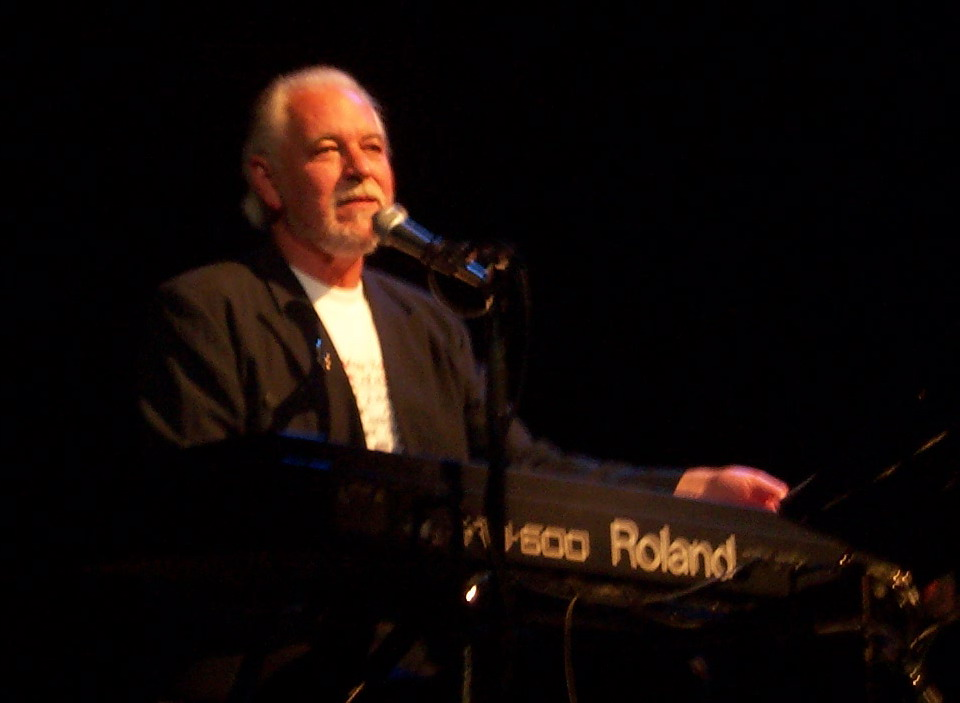
Gary Brooker performed the song at the Concert for George in 2002.

Harrison performed "Old Brown Shoe" throughout his 1991 Japanese tour with Eric Clapton, Harrison's only tour as a solo artist other than his 1974 North American tour. Typical of his approach during the Japanese concerts, the song's arrangement was changed slightly from the Beatles' recording. A live version was included on Harrison's 1992 album Live in Japan. He also played the song at his only full-length concert in the UK – a benefit for the Natural Law Party held at the Royal Albert Hall in London on 6 April 1992.

Gary Brooker performed "Old Brown Shoe" at the Concert for George, backed by a large band that included Clapton and Preston. The concert took place at the Royal Albert Hall in November 2002, a year after Harrison's death. Brooker, whose former band the Paramounts supported the Beatles on their December 1965 UK tour, recalled having difficulty mastering the vocal line. Despite being known as a powerful singer, Brooker said: "It's a very difficult song to sing; it's totally George Harrison, and you have to become a different person to be able to sing it. It took me a long, long time to learn it and I still couldn't sing it like George."

Leslie West contributed a recording to the 2003 album Songs from the Material World: A Tribute to George Harrison. At the George Fest tribute concert in 2014, the song was performed by Conan O'Brien.

== Personnel ==
According to Mark Lewisohn, Ian MacDonald and John Winn (except where noted):

- George Harrison – vocals, tack piano, Hammond organ, guitars, bass guitar, guitar solo
- John Lennon – backing vocals, guitar
- Paul McCartney – backing vocals
- Ringo Starr – drums

However, according to the book included in the Abbey Road 50th Anniversary Super Deluxe release, which includes take 2 of the song, Starr was away filming The Magic Christian when the song was recorded. The line-up given in the book for the released version is as follows:

- George Harrison – lead vocals, guitars, organ
- John Lennon – piano, backing vocals
- Paul McCartney – drums, bass, backing vocals

== Sources ==
- Allison, Dale C. Jr. (2006). The Love There That's Sleeping: The Art and Spirituality of George Harrison. New York, NY: Continuum. ISBN 978-0-8264-1917-0.
- Babiuk, Andy (2002). Beatles Gear: All the Fab Four's Instruments, from Stage to Studio. San Francisco, CA: Backbeat Books. ISBN 978-0-87930-731-8.
- The Beatles (2000). The Beatles Anthology. San Francisco, CA: Chronicle Books. ISBN 0-8118-2684-8.
- The Beatles (2021). The Beatles: Get Back. New York, NY: Callaway Arts & Entertainment. ISBN 978-0-935112-96-2.
- Castleman, Harry; Podrazik, Walter J. (1976). All Together Now: The First Complete Beatles Discography 1961–1975. New York, NY: Ballantine Books. ISBN 0-345-25680-8.
- Clayson, Alan (2003). George Harrison. London: Sanctuary. ISBN 1-86074-489-3.
- Doggett, Peter (2011). You Never Give Me Your Money: The Beatles After the Breakup. New York, NY: It Books. ISBN 978-0-06-177418-8.
- The Editors of Rolling Stone (2002). Harrison. New York, NY: Rolling Stone Press. ISBN 978-0-7432-3581-5.
- Everett, Walter (1999). The Beatles as Musicians: Revolver Through the Anthology. New York, NY: Oxford University Press. ISBN 0-19-512941-5.
- Gould, Jonathan (2007). Can't Buy Me Love: The Beatles, Britain and America. London: Piatkus. ISBN 978-0-7499-2988-6.
- Guesdon, Jean-Michel; Margotin, Philippe (2013). All the Songs: The Story Behind Every Beatles Release. New York, NY: Black Dog & Leventhal. ISBN 978-1-57912-952-1.
- Harrison, George (2002) [1980]. I, Me, Mine. San Francisco, CA: Chronicle Books. ISBN 978-0-8118-5900-4.
- Huntley, Elliot J. (2006). Mystical One: George Harrison – After the Break-up of the Beatles. Toronto, ON: Guernica Editions. ISBN 978-1-55071-197-4.
- Ingham, Chris (2006). The Rough Guide to the Beatles. London: Rough Guides/Penguin. ISBN 978-1-84836-525-4.
- Inglis, Ian (2010). The Words and Music of George Harrison. Santa Barbara, CA: Praeger. ISBN 978-0-313-37532-3.
- Leng, Simon (2006). While My Guitar Gently Weeps: The Music of George Harrison. Milwaukee, WI: Hal Leonard. ISBN 978-1-4234-0609-9.
- Lewisohn, Mark (2005) [1988]. The Complete Beatles Recording Sessions: The Official Story of the Abbey Road Years 1962–1970. London: Bounty Books. ISBN 978-0-7537-2545-0.
- MacDonald, Ian (2005). Revolution in the Head: The Beatles' Records and the Sixties. Chicago, IL: Chicago Review Press. ISBN 978-1-55652-733-3.
- Miles, Barry (2001). The Beatles Diary Volume 1: The Beatles Years. London: Omnibus Press. ISBN 0-7119-8308-9.
- Pedler, Dominic (2003). The Songwriting Secrets of the Beatles. London: Omnibus Press. ISBN 978-0-7119-8167-6.
- Riley, Tim (2002) [1988]. Tell Me Why – The Beatles: Album by Album, Song by Song, the Sixties and After. Cambridge, MA: Da Capo Press. ISBN 978-0-306-81120-3.
- Sheff, David (2000) [1981]. All We Are Saying: The Last Major Interview with John Lennon and Yoko Ono. London: St. Martin's Griffin. ISBN 978-0-312-25464-3.
- Spizer, Bruce (2003). The Beatles on Apple Records. New Orleans, LA: 498 Productions. ISBN 0-9662649-4-0.
- Sulpy, Doug; Schweighardt, Ray (1999). Get Back: The Unauthorized Chronicle of the Beatles' Let It Be Disaster. New York, NY: St. Martin's Griffin. ISBN 0-312-19981-3.
- Turner, Steve (1999). A Hard Day's Write: The Stories Behind Every Beatles Song. New York, NY: Carlton/HarperCollins. ISBN 0-06-273698-1.
- Unterberger, Richie (2006). The Unreleased Beatles: Music & Film. San Francisco, CA: Backbeat Books. ISBN 978-0-87930-892-6.
- Winn, John C. (2009). That Magic Feeling: The Beatles' Recorded Legacy, Volume Two, 1966–1970. New York, NY: Three Rivers Press. ISBN 978-0-307-45239-9.
- Womack, Kenneth (2014). The Beatles Encyclopedia: Everything Fab Four. Santa Barbara, CA: ABC-CLIO. ISBN 978-0-313-39171-2.
