= Concert for George =

2002 concert held in memory of George Harrison

The Concert for George was held at the Royal Albert Hall in London on 29 November 2002 as a memorial to George Harrison on the first anniversary of his death. The event was organised by Harrison's widow, Olivia, and his son, Dhani, and arranged under the musical direction of Eric Clapton. The profits from the event went to the Material World Charitable Foundation, an organisation founded by Harrison.

== Performances ==
The concert opened with a traditional Sanskrit invocation, the Sarvesham chant, followed by Indian music starting with Anoushka Shankar, daughter of Ravi Shankar, playing "Your Eyes". Next, Anoushka Shankar, Dhani Harrison, and Jeff Lynne performed "The Inner Light", followed by a Ravi Shankar composition "Arpan" (Sanskrit for 'to give'), specially written for the occasion.

Next, there was a comedy interlude with four of the surviving members of the Monty Python troupe (Eric Idle, Terry Gilliam, Terry Jones along with Python contributor Neil Innes) performing "Sit on My Face". Then, Michael Palin came out as an over-the-top announcer who eventually states that he only ever wanted to be a lumberjack. He was then joined by the Pythons, Innes, Carol Cleveland, Tom Hanks, and The Fred Tomlinson Singers to perform "The Lumberjack Song".

The remainder of the concert featured "George's Band" and included the surviving members of the Beatles (Paul McCartney and Ringo Starr), Harrison's son Dhani Harrison, as well as musicians Eric Clapton, Jeff Lynne, Tom Petty and the Heartbreakers, Billy Preston, Jools Holland, Albert Lee, Sam Brown, Gary Brooker, Joe Brown, Ray Cooper, Andy Fairweather-Low, Marc Mann, Dave Bronze, Klaus Voormann, Jim Keltner and several other musicians who had appeared on Harrison's recordings over the years.

They played a selection of mostly Harrison's songs, from both Beatles and post-Beatles eras, generally staying faithful to Harrison's arrangements. Performances included Lynne on "I Want to Tell You" and "Give Me Love (Give Me Peace on Earth)"; Clapton on "If I Needed Someone" and "Beware of Darkness"; Petty on "I Need You" and "Taxman"; Petty, Lynne, Dhani Harrison, and Keltner on "Handle With Care" (reuniting most of the surviving Traveling Wilburys except for Bob Dylan); Clapton and Preston on "Isn't It a Pity"; Starr on "Photograph" and "Honey Don't"; McCartney on "For You Blue" and "All Things Must Pass"; McCartney and Clapton on "Something" (McCartney opening with a solo ukulele accompaniment that shifts into a full band version featuring Clapton); Clapton, McCartney, and Starr reuniting on "While My Guitar Gently Weeps". Preston on "My Sweet Lord"; and the group performance of "Wah-Wah".

Joe Brown closed the show with a rendition of "I'll See You in My Dreams" on ukulele, one of Harrison's favourite instruments.

The event was filmed and a motion picture version, directed by David Leland and photographed by Academy Award-winning cinematographer Chris Menges, was released on DVD on 17 November 2003. A compact disc version was also released on the same date although the Monty Python and Sam Brown tracks were not included on the CD. A Blu-ray version was released by Rhino Records on 22 March 2011.

In 2018, to honour what would have been Harrison's 75th birthday, the concert made its debut on streaming services, and was issued on a vinyl LP set for the first time.

== Set list ==
All songs written by George Harrison unless otherwise indicated.

1. "Sarveshaam"
  - Traditional prayer – including a dedication by Ravi Shankar
2. "Your Eyes" (Ravi Shankar) – 8:22
  - Anoushka Shankar: sitar; Tanmoy Bose: tabla
3. "The Inner Light" – 3:01
  - Anoushka Shankar: sitar; Jeff Lynne: vocals, acoustic guitar; Dhani Harrison: backing vocals, piano; Rajendara Prasanna: shahnai; Tanmoy Bose: tabla; Sunil Gupta: flute; M. Balanchandar: mridangam; Unidentified musicians: other instruments
4. "Arpan" (Ravi Shankar) – 23:01
  - Anoushka Shankar: conductor; Sukanya Shankar: vocal-shloka; M. Balanchandar: mridangam; Rajendara Prasanna: shahnai; Vishwa Mohan Bhatt: mohan vina; Tanmoy Bose: tabla, dholak; Chandrasekhar, Balu Raghuraman: violins; Eric Clapton: acoustic guitar; Pedro Eustache: wind instruments; Sunil Gupta: flute; Anuradha Krishamurthi, O.S. Arun: vocals; Jane Lister: harp; Gaurav Mazumdar: sitar; Snehashish Mzumdar: mandolin; Ramesh Mishra: sarangi; Pirashanna Thevarajah: percussion; Kenji Ota: tanpura; Barry Phillips: cello; Emil Richards: marimba; Partho Sarathy: sarod; Hari Sivanesan, Sivaskti Sivanesan: veena; Boys and Girls Choir courtesy of Bharatiya Vidya Bhavan; English Chamber Choir; London Metropolitan Orchestra (Andrew Brown, Roger Chase, Chris Fish, Helen Hathorn, Lynda Houghton, Ian Humphries, Zoe Martlew, Stella Page, Debbie Widdup)
  - Michael Kamen – string conductor, string arrangement
5. Comedy Interlude including four members of Monty Python: Eric Idle, Terry Gilliam, Terry Jones, and Michael Palin. Also performing: Neil Innes, Carol Cleveland, Tom Hanks, and The Fred Tomlinson Singers.
  - "Sit on My Face" (Eric Idle / Harry Parr-Davies) – 0:44
  - "The Lumberjack Song" (Terry Jones / Michael Palin / Fred Tomlinson) – 4:09
6. "I Want to Tell You" – 2:52
  - Jeff Lynne: vocals, guitar
7. "If I Needed Someone" – 2:28
  - Eric Clapton: vocals, guitar
8. "Old Brown Shoe" – 3:48
  - Gary Brooker: vocals, electric piano
9. "Give Me Love (Give Me Peace on Earth)" – 3:29
  - Jeff Lynne: vocals, acoustic guitar; Marc Mann slide guitar; Andy Fairweather-Low: vocals, lead guitar; Eric Clapton: acoustic guitar; Dave Bronze: bass; Gary Brooker: vocals, keyboards; Henry Spinetti: drums
10. "Beware of Darkness" – 4:00
  - Eric Clapton: vocals, guitar
11. "Here Comes the Sun" – 3:09
  - Joe Brown: vocals, acoustic guitar; Neil Gauntlett: acoustic guitar; Dave "Rico" Niles: bass; Phil Capaldi: drums; Andy Fairweather-Low: electric guitar
12. "That's the Way It Goes" – 3:39
  - Joe Brown: vocals, mandolin; Neil Gauntlett: acoustic guitar; Dave "Rico" Niles: bass; Phil Capaldi: drums; Andy Fairweather-Low: slide electric guitar
13. "Horse to the Water" (George Harrison / Dhani Harrison) – 5:08
  - Sam Brown: vocals; Jools Holland: piano; Jim Capaldi: drums
14. "Taxman" – 3:10
  - Tom Petty: vocals, guitar; Mike Campbell: guitar; Benmont Tench: electric piano; Ron Blair: bass; Steve Ferrone: drums; Scott Thurston: backing vocals, guitar
15. "I Need You" – 3:00
  - Tom Petty: vocals, 12-string acoustic guitar; Mike Campbell: guitar; Benmont Tench: electric piano; Ron Blair: bass; Steve Ferrone: drums; Scott Thurston: backing vocals, guitar
16. "Handle with Care" (George Harrison / Jeff Lynne / Roy Orbison / Tom Petty / Bob Dylan) – 3:27
  - Tom Petty: vocals, 12-string acoustic guitar; Jeff Lynne: vocals, guitar; Dhani Harrison: acoustic guitar; Scott Thurston: backing vocals, guitar, harmonica; Mike Campbell: guitar; Benmont Tench: electric piano; Ron Blair: bass; Steve Ferrone: drums; Jim Keltner: drums
17. "Isn't It a Pity" – 6:58
  - Billy Preston: vocals, Hammond organ; Eric Clapton: vocals, guitar solos; Marc Mann: slide guitar
18. "Photograph" (George Harrison / Richard Starkey) – 3:56
  - Ringo Starr: vocals; Jim Horn: sax solo
19. "Honey Don't" (Carl Perkins) – 3:03
  - Ringo Starr: vocals; Albert Lee: guitar solo; Gary Brooker: piano solo; Billy Preston: Hammond organ
20. "For You Blue" – 3:04
  - Paul McCartney: vocals, acoustic guitar; Ringo Starr: drums; Marc Mann: slide guitar; Gary Brooker: piano solo
21. "Something" – 4:25
  - Paul McCartney: vocals, ukulele, acoustic guitar; Ringo Starr: drums; Eric Clapton: vocals, guitar; Marc Mann: guitar
22. "All Things Must Pass" – 3:33
  - Paul McCartney: vocals, acoustic guitar; Ringo Starr: drums; Eric Clapton: 12-string acoustic guitar; Dhani Harrison: electric guitar; Klaus Voormann: bass; Marc Mann: slide guitar
23. "While My Guitar Gently Weeps" – 5:57
  - Eric Clapton: vocals, guitar; Paul McCartney: harmony vocals, piano; Ringo Starr: drums; Dhani Harrison: acoustic guitar; Marc Mann: guitar
24. "My Sweet Lord" – 5:02
  - Billy Preston: vocals, Hammond organ; Paul McCartney: piano; Ringo Starr: drums; Eric Clapton: 12-string acoustic guitar; Dhani Harrison: backing vocals, acoustic guitar; Marc Mann: slide guitar; Jeff Lynne: acoustic guitar
25. "Wah-Wah" – 6:06
  - Eric Clapton: vocals, guitar; Jeff Lynne: vocals, acoustic guitar; Paul McCartney: piano; Ringo Starr: drums; Andy Fairweather-Low: vocals, guitar; Supergroup of Guest Musicians: other instruments
26. "I'll See You in My Dreams" (Isham Jones / Gus Kahn) – 4:01
  - Joe Brown: vocals, ukulele; Neil Gauntlett: acoustic guitar; Dave "Rico" Niles: bass; Phil Capaldi: drums; Chris Stainton: digital keyboard.

== George's Band (after interlude) and guests ==
- Eric Clapton – guitars, musical director
- Jeff Lynne, Marc Mann, Andy Fairweather Low, Dhani Harrison, Albert Lee, Tom Petty, Joe Brown, Paul McCartney – guitars
- Gary Brooker, Chris Stainton, Billy Preston, Jools Holland, Paul McCartney – keyboards
- Dave Bronze, Klaus Voormann – bass
- Henry Spinetti, Jim Keltner, Ringo Starr, Jim Capaldi – drums
- Ray Cooper, Emil Richards, Jim Capaldi – percussion
- Jim Horn – tenor saxophone
- Tom Scott – alto saxophone
- Katie Kissoon, Tessa Niles, Sam Brown – backing vocals
