= George Harrison–Eric Clapton 1991 Japanese Tour =

1991 concert tour

- Tour by George Harrison and Eric Clapton
- Poster to the final concerts of the tour
- Start date: 1 December 1991
- End date: 17 December 1991
- Legs: 1
- No. of shows: 12
George Harrison tour chronology
George Harrison–Ravi Shankar 1974 North American Tour	George Harrison–Eric Clapton 1991 Japanese Tour

George Harrison and Eric Clapton played twelve concerts in Japan in December of 1991. This was the second solo tour of George Harrison's career, and ended up being his last. Recordings of performances from this tour were released on Harrison's 1992 album Live in Japan.

== Overview ==
The tour featured mostly Harrison's performances as a lead artist with Clapton taking the lead role in the middle of the shows for four songs.

== Set list ==
Average set list:

1. "I Want to Tell You"
2. "Old Brown Shoe"
3. "Taxman"
4. "Give Me Love (Give Me Peace on Earth)"
5. "If I Needed Someone"
6. "Something"
7. "Fish On the Sand" (played only on 1 and 2 December)
8. "Love Comes to Everyone" (played only on 1 December)
9. "What Is Life"
10. "Dark Horse"
11. "Piggies"
12. "Pretending" (Jerry Lynn Williams)
13. "Old Love" (Eric Clapton, Robert Cray)
14. "Badge" (Eric Clapton, George Harrison)
15. "Wonderful Tonight" (Eric Clapton)
16. "Got My Mind Set on You" (Rudy Clark)
17. "Cloud 9"
18. "Here Comes the Sun"
19. "My Sweet Lord"
20. "All Those Years Ago"
21. "Cheer Down" (George Harrison, Tom Petty)
22. "Devil's Radio"
23. "Isn't It a Pity"

Encore:

1. "While My Guitar Gently Weeps"
2. "Roll Over Beethoven"

== Personnel ==
- George Harrison – rhythm, lead guitar and slide guitars, acoustic guitar, lead vocals
- Eric Clapton – lead guitar, rhythm guitar, acoustic guitar, backing vocals, lead vocals on "Pretending", "Old Love", "Badge", and "Wonderful Tonight"
- Andy Fairweather Low – rhythm guitar, backing vocals
- Nathan East – bass, backing vocals
- Chuck Leavell – piano, Hammond organ, keyboards, backing vocals
- Greg Phillinganes – keyboards, backing vocals
- Steve Ferrone – drums
- Ray Cooper – percussion, drums
- Katie Kissoon – background vocals
- Tessa Niles – background vocals

== Tour dates ==
Date	City	Country	Venue
1 December 1991	Yokohama	Japan	Yokohama Arena
2 December 1991	Osaka	Japan	Osaka-jō Hall
3 December 1991	Osaka	Japan	Osaka-jō Hall
5 December 1991	Nagoya	Japan	Nagoya International Exhibition Hall
6 December 1991	Hiroshima	Japan	Hiroshima Sun Plaza
9 December 1991	Fukuoka	Japan	Fukuoka Kokusai Center
10 December 1991	Osaka	Japan	Osaka-jo Hall
11 December 1991	Osaka	Japan	Osaka-jo Hall
12 December 1991	Osaka	Japan	Osaka-jo Hall
14 December 1991	Tokyo	Japan	Tokyo Dome
15 December 1991	Tokyo	Japan	Tokyo Dome
17 December 1991	Tokyo	Japan	Tokyo Dome
