= Devil's Radio =

- Cover to promotional single release

Song by George Harrison

from the album Cloud Nine
- Released: 2 November 1987
- Recorded: 1987
- Genre: Rockabilly
- Length: 3:52
- Label: Dark Horse
- Songwriter: George Harrison
- Producers: Jeff Lynne, George Harrison

"Devil's Radio" is a song written by George Harrison that was first released on Harrison's 1987 album Cloud Nine. It was not released commercially as a single, but a promotional single was released and the song reached #4 on the Billboard Album Rock Tracks chart.

== Lyrics and music ==
"Devil's Radio" was inspired by a church billboard Harrison had seen stating "Gossip: The Devil's Radio...Don't Be a Broadcaster." The song's theme is an attack on gossip, trivia and cynical talk radio which spreads inaccuracies and falsehoods. The song uses metaphors such as "vultures," "weeds," "pollution" and "industrial waste" to drive home the point of gossip's effects. The theme was a personal one to Harrison, as he had felt victimized by gossip and by the media attention he received as an ex-Beatle, which inhibited his ability to live a normal life. This point is driven home by the line "You wonder why I don't hang out much/I wonder how you can't see."

"Devil's Radio" begins with a repeated recitation of the word "Gossip" before launching in the verses describing the evils of gossip. Chip Madinger and Mark Easter wrote that the music was inspired by the Eurythmics, making it one of the few songs in which Harrison was influenced by contemporary musical trends. Harrison biographer Simon Leng described the music accompaniment as Harrison's most aggressive since "Wah-Wah" in 1971 and described the style of the music as rockabilly. Leng compared the opening of "Devil's Radio" to songs of Chuck Berry and particularly praised Harrison's vocal and the counterpoint provided by Eric Clapton, who played guitar on the song along with Harrison. The other musicians who performed on the song were Elton John on piano, Jeff Lynne on bass guitar and keyboards, Ringo Starr on drums and Ray Cooper on percussion.

== Reception ==
Although not released commercially as a single, "Devil's Radio" reached #4 on the Billboard Album Rock Tracks chart. Inglis described the song as "a fiery dose of contemporary rock 'n' roll at its most compelling" and saw it as an inspiration for some of the songs on Tom Petty's Full Moon Fever and Into the Great Wide Open which, like "Devil's Radio," were produced by Lynne. Mat Snow praised Lynne's production for bringing out the "wry, loving humor of George's singing," even though Harrison's voice often struggles with up–tempo songs like this.

Allmusic critic Stephen Thomas Erlewine called it one of the "best moments" on Cloud Nine. Madinger and Easter reacted similarly. Harrison biographer Elliot Huntley called it one of Cloud Nine's "most instantly accessible tracks" and expressed surprise that it wasn't released as a commercial single, stating that its honky tonk piano and Beatle-like backing vocals made it a natural album-oriented rock radio track. Copley News reviewer Divina Infusino described the song as "biting commentary." Santa Cruz Sentinel critic Paul Wagner considered the song to be "among the best two-guitar rock ever recorded."

A live version of "Devil's Radio" was included on Harrison's live album Live in Japan in 1992. This version was recorded during Harrison's 1991 Japanese tour with Clapton.

== Personnel ==
- George Harrison – lead vocals, rhythm guitar
- Jeff Lynne – bass guitar, keyboards, backing vocals
- Elton John – piano
- Ringo Starr – drums
- Eric Clapton – lead guitar
- Ray Cooper – percussion
