= Hari's on Tour (Express) =

- 1974 B-side face label

Instrumental by George Harrison

from the album Dark Horse
- A-side: "Ding Dong, Ding Dong" (US)
- Released: 9 December 1974
- Recorded: April 1974
- Studio: FPSHOT, Oxfordshire
- Genre: Rock, jazz-funk
- Length: 4:43
- Label: Apple
- Songwriter(s): George Harrison
- Producer(s): George Harrison

"Hari's on Tour (Express)" is an instrumental by English musician George Harrison, released as the opening track of his 1974 album Dark Horse. It was also the B-side of the album's second single – which was "Ding Dong, Ding Dong" in North America and most other territories, and "Dark Horse" in Britain and some European countries. Among Harrison's post-Beatles solo releases, the track is the first of only two genuine instrumentals he released from 1970 onwards – the other being the Grammy Award-winning "Marwa Blues", from his 2002 album Brainwashed.

Harrison recorded "Hari's on Tour" in April 1974 at a spontaneous session held at his home, Friar Park. A slide guitar-based composition, the track also features saxophonist Tom Scott and the latter's jazz-rock band L.A. Express, who were touring as Joni Mitchell's backing group at the time. It was the first Harrison song to feature Scott, who became a regular collaborator and served as band leader during Harrison's only series of concerts in North America, the highly publicised "Dark Horse Tour" with Ravi Shankar. "Hari's on Tour (Express)" was played as the opening number throughout this tour, over November and December 1974.

Although music critics and Harrison biographers have generally viewed the album track in an unfavourable light, several concert reviewers identified it as an effective opener for the shows. "Hari's on Tour" is one of only two songs from the 1974 tour to have been released officially, after a live version was included on the limited-edition Songs by George Harrison 2 EP in 1992. This live recording was taken from the Washington, DC stop on the tour, during which Harrison met with President Gerald Ford at the White House.

== Background ==
George Harrison first worked with jazz saxophonist, flautist and arranger Tom Scott in April 1973, during the Los Angeles sessions for Ravi Shankar's Shankar Family & Friends album. The two musicians also contributed to Ringo Starr's album Ringo around that time, as well as Cheech & Chong's Los Cochinos. Outside of his session work, Scott's main activities were leading his band, L.A. Express, and backing Joni Mitchell, both live and in the studio. Just as Harrison had long combined elements of Hindustani classical music with Western rock and gospel, and was now moving towards the funk and soul genres, Scott's solo work fused jazz, funk, pop and Middle Eastern influences. His collaborations with Mitchell also coincided with her move from confessional folk songwriting towards pop and jazz, and eventually avant garde.

Harrison, Scott and Mitchell soon developed a mutual rapport, according to L.A. Express bassist Max Bennett. In addition to carrying out further sessions for Shankar Family & Friends in Los Angeles, in March 1974, Harrison had begun spending time there trying to set up his own record label, with the winding down of the Beatles' Apple Records from mid 1973 onwards. In August 1973, rumours in the music industry claimed that Harrison, Bob Dylan, Joan Baez and Paul Simon were forming a label together; in fact, Harrison founded Dark Horse Records, one of the first releases of which was the Shankar album, and Dylan temporarily signed with David Geffen's Asylum Records, which was Mitchell's label. (Note: As his distributor and financier for Dark Horse, Harrison forged a partnership with A&M Records, a company noted for its artist-friendly approach and the distributor of Ode Records, the label for which Scott and the L.A. Express recorded.)

== Composition and recording ==
Mitchell's tour in support of her critically acclaimed Court and Spark album arrived in London in April 1974. While backstage at her and Scott's show at the New Victoria Theatre, Harrison invited the five members of the L.A. Express to come out to his Oxfordshire home, Friar Park, the following day. Bennett recalls that they arrived by limousine and he mistook the property's grand gatehouse for the main residence.

Scott later told music journalist Michael Gross that only a social visit was planned, but the band were impressed with Friar Park's 16-track home studio, FPSHOT, and Harrison suggested they record something. The first song they worked on was an untitled instrumental tune that later became known as "Hari's on Tour (Express)", for which Scott made a lead sheet for the band. Part of the title was taken from "Hari Georgeson", the latest pseudonym adopted by Harrison when working with non-EMI/Capitol artists, since he was still contracted to Apple until January 1976.

[Harrison] had an idea and we just latched onto it … we just sort of ambled down the musical path until we came to someplace where we felt it sounded good.

– Max Bennett, recalling the session for "Hari's on Tour"

Harrison played slide guitar on the track, in his preferred open E tuning, adopting a similar sound to the one he had used three years earlier on John Lennon's song "How Do You Sleep?" Aside from Scott and Bennett's contributions, on saxophone and bass, respectively, the other musicians were Robben Ford (electric guitar), Roger Kellaway (piano) and John Guerin (drums). Harrison's musical biographer, Simon Leng, writes that the tune predominantly uses major chords, with the "main melodic interest" coming with a shift to C♯ minor seventh, which provides "a moment of softening sweetness". Leng notes the contrast between Harrison's Fender Stratocaster "roaring into action" on this song and the "opulence" of his previous album, Living in the Material World, and suggests that Harrison now "just wanted to be one of the boys" in a "working, rocking band". The engineer at the session was Phil McDonald.

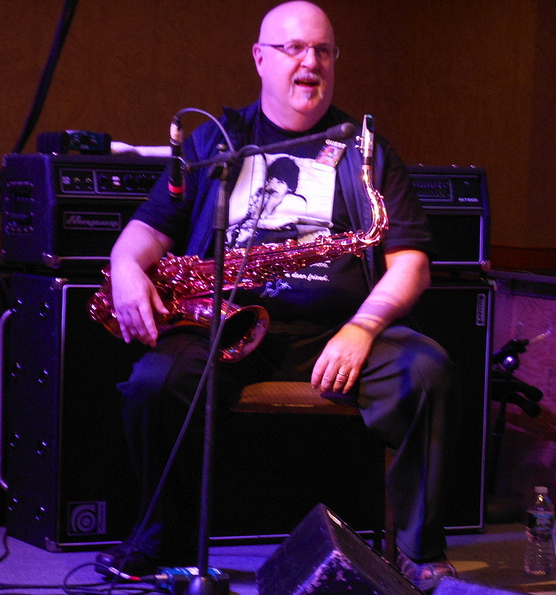
Tom Scott (pictured at a Beatles fan convention in 2013)

According to Scott, the basic track took "a couple of hours" before they had a satisfactory take. The musicians then recorded a second song, "Simply Shady", which, like "Hari's on Tour", would be included on Harrison's forthcoming album, Dark Horse. The five band members stayed over at Friar Park before Ford, Bennett, Kellaway and Guerin left for Denver the following day. Scott says he stayed on and worked further with Harrison at FPSHOT; in addition to the various horn parts, he played organ on "Hari's on Tour".

In the same interview with Gross, for Circus Raves magazine, Scott recalled that he was the first Western musician that Harrison approached about joining him and Shankar for a tour of the United States and Canada later in the year. (Note: The idea for the tour, and for an ambitious musical revue in Europe beforehand known as Ravi Shankar's Music Festival from India, had come about in February 1974, when Harrison visited Shankar in the Indian city of Benares.) The tour would be the first in North America by a former Beatle since the group's 1966 US visit, and Harrison's first live performances since his staging of the Concert for Bangladesh in August 1971. Rather than include Beatles material on the 1974 tour, however, Harrison planned to present a varied program combining rock, soul/R&B, jazz, funk and Indian classical music. (Note: Partly at Shankar's urging during the tour rehearsals, Harrison agreed to include Beatles songs such as "Something" in his setlist – albeit after "rebelling against [the idea]", by altering the original lyrics. According to Scott, though, "While My Guitar Gently Weeps" and "In My Life" were two Beatles tracks that Harrison had always intended to play.) Eight Arms to Hold You authors Chip Madinger and Mark Easter suggest that "Hari's on Tour (Express)" was written "simply as a show opener" for the North American concerts, which would also feature Harrison's former Apple Records protégé Billy Preston.

Although his 1969 experimental album Electronic Sound consists of Moog synthesizer sounds and the 1968 Wonderwall Music soundtrack is almost entirely devoid of vocals, out of all the tracks released by Harrison as a solo artist after the Beatles' break-up in 1970, "Hari's on Tour" is a rare example of a genuine instrumental composition. Only 2002's "Marwa Blues" stands as another. (Note: Jam-session improvisations, but not strict compositions, were included on the Apple Jam disc as part of All Things Must Pass; Harrison's vocals were removed from the 1975 song "You" to create the instrumental reprise "A Bit More of You"; and the "neo-instrumental" "Greece" and "Zig-Zag" both contain snatches of lyrics.) Among other projects they worked on together through to the early 1980s, Harrison played on the instrumental "Appolonia (Foxtrata)", from Scott's 1975 album New York Connection, and Scott helped produce Harrison's debut on Dark Horse Records, Thirty Three & 1/3.

== North American tour and album release ==
The main [concern] is that I've lost my voice … There's a good chance that on the first few concerts I'm gonna come out playing instrumentals. (Laughter from Harrison and the audience.)

– Harrison speaking at his pre-tour press conference, as reported in The Valley Advocate

Harrison's overcommittal of his time to Dark Horse acts Ravi Shankar and Splinter during 1974 resulted in him having to rush-record much of Dark Horse while preparing for the North American tour. Due to the pressure, Harrison developed laryngitis during rehearsals and damaged his voice. As well as placing further importance on the instrumentals in his setlist, which included "Hari's on Tour (Express)" and Scott's track "Tom Cat", Harrison's depleted vocals marred the concerts for many observers.

It's not true that the tour's been bad … In fact, the music is sensational. The people who say it's terrible wanted to go and see a Beatles medley … But they have to try and understand that George is an ex-Beatle. He has other interests, other musical interests …

– Scott speaking in Toronto in December 1974

In addition, while many critics admired the adventurousness of the musical program and reviewed the shows favourably, others, particularly in music publications such as Rolling Stone, wrote scathingly of Harrison's reluctance to acknowledge the Beatles' legacy, together with his willingness to share the spotlight so readily with Shankar's orchestra of classical musicians and Preston. In his role as band leader, Scott spoke out in support of Harrison's musical direction and refuted reports that the tour was not going well; instead, he told Circus Raves, audience reaction had been "radically different from city to city" and dependent on whether concertgoers chose to listen, or came expecting to hear the Beatles.

Harrison played "Hari's on Tour" as the opening song throughout the tour, which began on 2 November 1974 in Vancouver and ended in New York City on 20 December. It was preceded by a recording of Monty Python's "The Lumberjack Song", played through the concert PA while the band took the stage. As the many bootlegs from the tour reveal, early on in each performance of "Hari's on Tour", Harrison often called out a greeting to the city or town in question. Some concert reviewers referred to the song as "Hari Good Boy Express" or "Hari Good Bye Express". The first of these two titles is how Harrison named the track on the preliminary artwork included in the 2014 reissue of Dark Horse.

The studio version appeared as the opening track on Dark Horse, followed by "Simply Shady". Due to the delay in its completion, the album was released on 9 December in North America, towards the end of the Harrison–Shankar tour, and a few days before Christmas in Britain. Although Christmas shows in the UK had been under consideration, no such performances took place, and Harrison's only tour after 1974 would be a series of Japanese concerts in December 1991 with Eric Clapton. Following its initial release, "Hari's on Tour" was issued as the B-side to the second single off the album – "Ding Dong, Ding Dong" in the United States, Canada and a number of other territories, and "Dark Horse" in Britain and some other European countries.

== Reception ==
Contrasting with his successes as a solo artist since 1970, Dark Horse earned Harrison the worst critical notices of his career. "Hari's on Tour (Express)" drew a favourable response during the 1974 tour, however, as reviewers commented on the energy with which the band performed the piece. In his feature article on the West Coast concerts, for Rolling Stone, Ben Fong-Torres described the song as a "well-arranged, tension-and-release number", while the Pacific Sun called it "a zingy and classically melodic instrumental ... a touchstone of the Harrison style". Reviewing the second show of the tour, D.P. Bond of the Seattle Post-Intelligencer wrote: "Harrison's opening instrumental piece was beautiful: the fullest, finest explosion of rock 'n' roll that I think I have ever heard."

The NME's Bob Woffinden wrote a notably unfavourable assessment of the Dark Horse album, in which he found "Hari's on Tour" to be "an unevenly paced boogie thing that has George blowing most of his licks straightaway and Tom Scott coming on with a few quasi-Jnr. Walker bursts". Woffinden continued: "Which, you feel, would not be a bad appetiser for the real meat to follow. Unfortunately, Hari's vegetarian." In an equally unfavourable review of the album, Jim Miller of Rolling Stone dismissed the track as "banal". Harrison biographer Alan Clayson refers to Hari's on Tour" as "an instrumental that went in one ear and out the other", while in The Beatles: An Illustrated Record, critics Roy Carr and Tony Tyler described it as sounding like "a backing track from which the vocal line has mysteriously been deleted". Author Elliot Huntley acknowledges that the musicians "performed brilliantly" on the recording, but adds, "unfortunately brilliant musicians alone do not a good song make".

Echoing the magazine's earlier support for the tour, Brian Harrigan of Melody Maker praised Harrison's "nifty slide guitar" on the opening song and throughout the album, which he felt "should certainly do a tremendous amount to salvage George's battered reputation". (Note: Although Bob Geldof (writing as Rob Geldof) had reported in Melody Maker on the ineffective pacing of Harrison's opening show, the setlist was substantially reworked straight after that Vancouver concert. Reviewing the Los Angeles dates for the same publication, Jacoba Atlas described the revised program as "a complete delight" and "dazzling in its skill without being theatrical in its presentation".) In his 1977 book The Beatles Forever, Nicholas Schaffner similarly opined that "Hari's on Tour" "boasts some mean licks" while commenting that neither the tour nor the album "warrant[ed] all the abuse they got". Writing more recently for AllMusic, Richard Ginell describes the recording as "Tom Scott's L.A. Express churning out all-pro L.A.-studio jazz/rock" and adds that the song "gets the doomed project off to a spirited start".

Simon Leng views this "neat instrumental" as a collaborative effort between Harrison and Scott, and a logical step for the guitarist, given Harrison's early appreciation of Chet Atkins' instrumentals. Leng regrets Harrison's apparent abandoning of his "meticulous approach" to recording in favour of uncharacteristic spontaneity, and concludes: "Ultimately, this good-time guitar showcase is as relevant as Dylan's 'Nashville Skyline Rag'." Ian Inglis writes of Scott's soprano sax producing an "atmosphere of anticipation" similar to a successful film or television theme, and identifies "Hari's on Tour" as an indication that Harrison, some years before his career became focused on movie production, was able to "effectively incorporate the conventions of a soundtrack within the codes of rock". Reviewing the 2014 reissue of Dark Horse, Joe Marchese of The Second Disc describes the track as "a bright opening to an album that would considerably darken in tone".

== Live version ==
The band was one of the hottest bands I'd ever [been in] ... I mean, maybe I was the worst one in the band! It was a fantastic band, and the tape is a rocking show.

– Harrison discussing his 1974 tour and the proposed live album, February 1975

Harrison recorded and filmed several of the 1974 concerts for a planned release, but only live versions of this instrumental and "For You Blue" have ever been issued officially. In 1992, "Hari's on Tour" appeared on the four-song EP accompanying Songs by George Harrison 2, a limited-edition, hand-bound book produced by Genesis Publications. Text accompanying this disc gives the recording information as simply "live in Washington DC in 1974", referring to Harrison's 13 December show at the Capital Centre in Landover, Maryland, a suburb of Washington. The book was limited to a print run of 2500 and published on 22 June 1992. (Note: Genesis produced the original, leather-bound edition of Harrison's autobiography, I, Me, Mine, as well as the first volume of Songs by George Harrison, in 1988. The EP from this first volume grouped the live "For You Blue" with songs rejected by Warner Bros. Records for inclusion on Harrison's 1981 album Somewhere in England.)

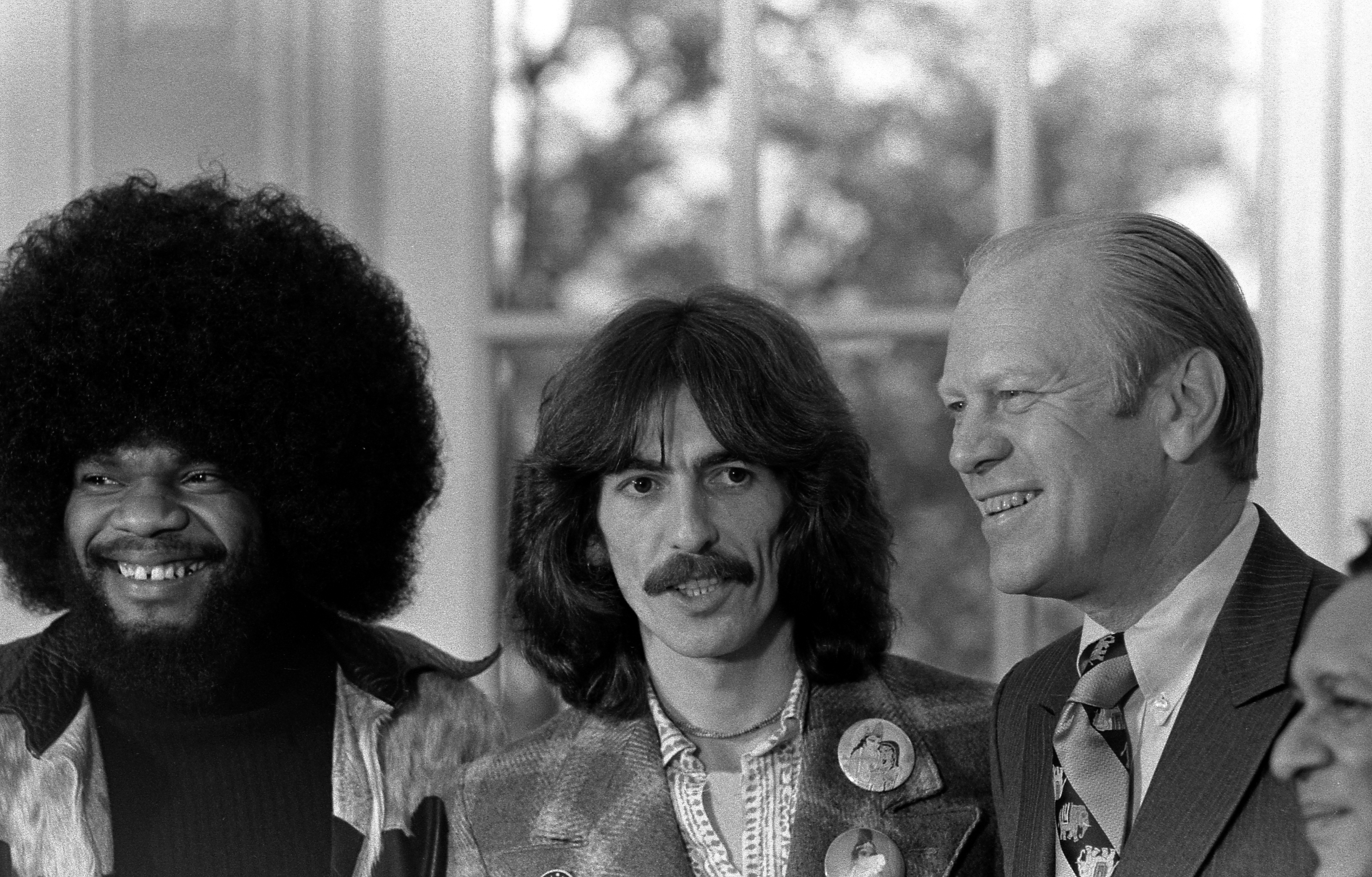
Billy Preston, Harrison and Shankar at the White House with US president Gerald Ford (third from left)

Described by Leng as "the leading performers of the period", Harrison's tour band comprised Scott and Robben Ford from the L.A. Express, Preston on keyboards, jazz percussionist Emil Richards, the rhythm section of Willie Weeks and Andy Newmark, and additional horn players Jim Horn and Chuck Findley. Jim Keltner joined as second drummer midway through the tour, and some of Ravi Shankar's musicians played during Harrison's portion of each show. The sound heard during the opening seconds of "Hari's on Tour" is a sarangi, played by Sultan Khan, who was one of the fifteen musicians in Shankar's orchestra.

The Washington stop was among the highlights of the tour. At the invitation of Jack Ford – son of US president Gerald Ford – Harrison, Shankar, Scott, Preston and others in the entourage visited the White House on 13 December, where Harrison met with President Ford. Surprised at the "good vibes" there so soon after the Watergate hearings, Harrison asked Ford to personally intercede in both John Lennon's struggle to be allowed to remain in the United States, and the US Treasury's audit of the funds raised through the Concert for Bangladesh.

Madinger and Easter write that this released version of the song is most likely a composite of performances from the evening show at Landover and the 6 December matinee performance at Toronto's Maple Leaf Gardens. As with all the tracks from the highly priced Songs by George Harrison volumes, "Hari's on Tour (Express)" is available unofficially on bootleg compilations such as Pirate Songs.

== Personnel ==
- George Harrison – acoustic guitar, slide guitar
- Robben Ford – electric guitar
- Roger Kellaway – piano
- Tom Scott – organ, saxophones, horn arrangement
- Max Bennett – bass guitar
- John Guerin – drums
- uncredited – tambourine

== Sources ==
- Dale C. Allison Jr., The Love There That's Sleeping: The Art and Spirituality of George Harrison, Continuum (New York, NY, 2006; ISBN 978-0-8264-1917-0).
- Keith Badman, The Beatles Diary Volume 2: After the Break-Up 1970–2001, Omnibus Press (London, 2001; ISBN 0-7119-8307-0).
- Roy Carr & Tony Tyler, The Beatles: An Illustrated Record, Trewin Copplestone Publishing (London, 1978; ISBN 0-450-04170-0).
- Harry Castleman & Walter J. Podrazik, All Together Now: The First Complete Beatles Discography 1961–1975, Ballantine Books (New York, NY, 1976; ISBN 0-345-25680-8).
- Alan Clayson, George Harrison, Sanctuary (London, 2003; ISBN 1-86074-489-3).
- Peter Doggett, You Never Give Me Your Money: The Beatles After the Breakup, It Books (New York, NY, 2011; ISBN 978-0-06-177418-8).
- The Editors of Rolling Stone, Harrison, Rolling Stone Press/Simon & Schuster (New York, NY, 2002; ISBN 0-7432-3581-9).
- Joshua M. Greene, Here Comes the Sun: The Spiritual and Musical Journey of George Harrison, John Wiley & Sons (Hoboken, NJ, 2006; ISBN 978-0-470-12780-3).
- Olivia Harrison, George Harrison: Living in the Material World, Abrams (New York, NY, 2011; ISBN 978-1-4197-0220-4).
- Elliot J. Huntley, Mystical One: George Harrison – After the Break-up of the Beatles, Guernica Editions (Toronto, ON, 2006; ISBN 1-55071-197-0).
- Ian Inglis, The Words and Music of George Harrison, Praeger (Santa Barbara, CA, 2010; ISBN 978-0-313-37532-3).
- Peter Lavezzoli, The Dawn of Indian Music in the West, Continuum (New York, NY, 2006; ISBN 0-8264-2819-3).
- Simon Leng, While My Guitar Gently Weeps: The Music of George Harrison, Hal Leonard (Milwaukee, WI, 2006; ISBN 1-4234-0609-5).
- Chip Madinger & Mark Easter, Eight Arms to Hold You: The Solo Beatles Compendium, 44.1 Productions (Chesterfield, MO, 2000; ISBN 0-615-11724-4).
- Robert Rodriguez, Fab Four FAQ 2.0: The Beatles' Solo Years, 1970–1980, Backbeat Books (Milwaukee, WI, 2010; ISBN 978-1-4165-9093-4).
- Patricia Romanowski & Holly George-Warren (eds), The New Rolling Stone Encyclopedia of Rock & Roll, Fireside/Rolling Stone Press (New York, NY, 1995; ISBN 0-684-81044-1).
- Nicholas Schaffner, The Beatles Forever, McGraw-Hill (New York, NY, 1978; ISBN 0-07-055087-5).
- Ravi Shankar, Raga Mala: The Autobiography of Ravi Shankar, Welcome Rain (New York, NY, 1999; ISBN 1-56649-104-5).
- Howard Sounes, Down the Highway: The Life of Bob Dylan, Doubleday (London, 2001; ISBN 0-385-60125-5).
- Bruce Spizer, The Beatles Solo on Apple Records, 498 Productions (New Orleans, LA, 2005; ISBN 0-9662649-5-9).
- Gary Tillery, Working Class Mystic: A Spiritual Biography of George Harrison, Quest Books (Wheaton, IL, 2011; ISBN 978-0-8356-0900-5).
- Bob Woffinden, The Beatles Apart, Proteus (London, 1981; ISBN 0-906071-89-5).
