= The Best of George Harrison =

Compilation album by George Harrison
- Released: 8 November 1976
- Recorded: 1965–1975
- Genre: Rock, pop
- Length: 45:04
- Label: Parlophone (UK), Capitol (US)
- Producer: George Martin; George Harrison; Phil Spector

George Harrison chronology
Extra Texture (Read All About It) (1975)	The Best of George Harrison (1976)	Thirty Three & ⅓ (1976)

Singles from The Best of George Harrison
- 1. "My Sweet Lord" Released: 24 December 1976

Alternative cover
- Cover for the North American, Australasian and French editions of the album

The Best of George Harrison is a 1976 compilation album by the English musician George Harrison, released following the expiration of his EMI-affiliated Apple Records contract. Uniquely among all of the four Beatles' solo releases, apart from posthumous compilations, it mixes a selection of the artist's songs recorded with the Beatles on one side, and later hits recorded under his own name on the other.

The song selection caused some controversy, since it underplayed Harrison's solo achievements during the 1970–1975 period, for much of which he had been viewed as the most successful ex-Beatle, artistically and commercially. Music critics have also noted the compilation's failure to provide a faithful picture of Harrison's contribution to the Beatles' work, due to the omission of any of his Indian music compositions. In a calculated move by EMI and its American subsidiary, Capitol Records, the compilation was issued during the same month as Harrison's debut on his Warner-distributed Dark Horse label, Thirty Three & ⅓.

In the United States, The Best of George Harrison peaked at number 31 on Billboard's albums chart and was certified gold by the Recording Industry Association of America in February 1977. The album failed to place on Britain's top 60 chart. It is the first of three hits-oriented Harrison compilation albums, and was followed by Best of Dark Horse 1976–1989 and the posthumously released Let It Roll: Songs by George Harrison. The album was issued on CD in 1987 featuring the cover artwork from the original British release, rather than the design created in-house by Capitol and used in the majority of territories internationally in 1976. The compilation has yet to be remastered since this 1987 release.

== Background ==
Ray Coleman of Melody Maker observed in December 1976 that it was "somehow ironic" that EMI, having made "millions of pounds" from the Beatles' recordings, should put out The Best of George Harrison within days of George Harrison's debut release on Warner Bros.-distributed Dark Horse Records. The compilation was instigated by EMI's US counterpart, Capitol Records, a company with which Harrison had grown disaffected since August 1971, due to what author Alan Clayson describes as its "avaricious dithering" over the release of the Concert for Bangladesh album. In a final effort to force Capitol to distribute that live album at cost price, to generate much-needed funds for the refugees from East Pakistan, Harrison had gone public with the issue and embarrassed the label. (Note: Beatles biographer Peter Doggett writes of the insufficient advance offered to Harrison in 1972 for his next album, Living in the Material World. In a postcard addressed to the managing director of "EMI Wreckords", an irritated Harrison asked, with reference to the commercial success of his previous studio releases: "How much did EMI make from All Things Must Pass/My Sweet Lord?")

On 26 January 1976, all the former Beatles' contracts with EMI/Capitol expired, and only Paul McCartney had chosen to re-sign with Capitol. The two record companies were now free to license releases featuring songs from the band's back catalogue and the individual members' solo work (except for McCartney's), without the need for artist's approval. Following EMI's reissue of the entire Beatles UK singles catalogue in February that year, Capitol's first venture under the new arrangement was to release a double album compilation, Rock 'n' Roll Music, along with accompanying singles. Issued in June 1976, Rock 'n' Roll Music contained 28 previously released tracks from throughout the Beatles' career. John Lennon and Ringo Starr both expressed dissatisfaction with the compilation's running order, the reversion to a pre-1967 royalty rate for the band, and what Starr termed Capitol's "craphouse" packaging. After the record company had promised "the largest selling campaign in the history of the music business", the album was a commercial success.

Late in 1975, EMI/Capitol had issued greatest-hits collections on the Apple Records imprint for Lennon and Starr – Shaved Fish and Blast from Your Past, respectively. Since Lennon and Starr were still nominally Apple artists, they each had input into the content and packaging of their solo compilation, and Lennon, in particular, was active in promoting his album. Shaved Fish and Blast from Your Past sold reasonably well, in America, but their sales failed to match record-company expectations. For Harrison, there had been long delays between releases following the international success of his All Things Must Pass triple album in 1970–71, due first to his commitment to the Bangladesh humanitarian aid project and later to his production work for Dark Horse Records acts Splinter and Ravi Shankar. Harrison issued his final studio album for Apple in the autumn of 1975, Extra Texture (Read All About It). As a result, by the time that Capitol came to prepare a compilation of his solo work the following year, he had effectively surrendered all artistic control over its content.

In the second half of 1976, thanks to the success of both Rock 'n' Roll Music and McCartney's world tour with his band Wings, the public's nostalgia for the Beatles was at a peak. Examples of this heightened interest included the increasingly generous offers from rival promoters Bill Sargent and Sid Bernstein for a one-off Beatles reunion concert; 20th Century Fox's musical documentary All This and World War II, for which, as with the 1974 stage play John, Paul, George, Ringo … and Bert, Harrison would refuse permission for any of his songs to appear; and Steve Harley & Cockney Rebel having a top-ten hit in the UK with a cover of Harrison's composition "Here Comes the Sun". The planned Harrison greatest-hits compilation then became an experiment by Capitol whereby Beatles tracks were mixed with solo hits on the one album. Harrison immediately disavowed the venture, he being the least attached to the band's legacy of all the former Beatles.

== Song selection ==
To fill one side of the LP, Capitol selected Harrison-written songs that had been released by the Beatles between 1965 and 1970. A risk-free approach prevailed, commentators have noted, both with the unimaginative album title and with the predictable selection of songs. Nowhere was Indian music represented, a musical genre in which Harrison was deeply involved via his long association with Ravi Shankar, and which various authors, and Shankar himself, credit Harrison with introducing to Western popular music. In this way, what McCartney has termed Harrison's "landmark" Indian compositions, "Within You, Without You" and "The Inner Light", were overlooked while "Taxman" received its second album release in six months (having been issued on Rock 'n' Roll Music). "While My Guitar Gently Weeps", "Here Comes the Sun" and "Something" were also among the tracks selected, even though they had all appeared on the 1973 Beatles compilation 1967–1970.

Side two was made up of Harrison's biggest solo hits: "My Sweet Lord" and "What Is Life" from All Things Must Pass (1970), "Give Me Love (Give Me Peace on Earth)" from Living in the Material World (1973), the title track from Dark Horse (1974), and "You" from Extra Texture (1975). The sixth solo song was the non-album single "Bangla Desh", released in 1971.

What they've done is take a lot of ... my songs which were Beatles songs, when there was really a lot of good songs they could have used of me separately. Solo songs. I don't see why they didn't do that. They did that with Ringo's Blast From Your Past and John's Shaved Fish.

— George Harrison, November 1976, voicing his disapproval of Capitol Records' choice of songs

Aside from the financial benefits of repackaging Beatles-era songs, part of the reason for Capitol reducing Harrison's mostly successful solo years thus far to six album tracks was due to the "lackluster" commercial fate of the Lennon and Starr compilations, author Nicholas Schaffner wrote in 1977. Another factor was Harrison's tendency to limit his single releases to a minimum: he had been reluctant to issue any single from All Things Must Pass originally, and the scheduled second single from Material World, "Don't Let Me Wait Too Long" – a "certain #1", in biographer Simon Leng's opinion – was cancelled altogether. In addition, authors Chip Madinger and Mark Easter write, a potentially offensive reference to the Catholic Church in "Awaiting on You All", from All Things Must Pass, prevented that song from "being the hit single it could have been otherwise". The big-hits requirement was not applied to the Beatles selections, only one of which, "Something", had been issued as the A-side of a single.

In November 1976, while promoting his new album, Thirty Three & ⅓, Harrison claimed that Capitol had ignored his suggested track list and alternative title for the collection. He compared the format unfavourably with the Starr and Lennon compilations, saying that "a lot of good songs" from his solo career could have appeared, rather than "digging into Beatles records".

Among the notable omissions from The Best of George Harrison, in author Robert Rodriguez's opinion, were "Isn't It a Pity" – one half of the double A-side single with "My Sweet Lord", and a number 1 hit in Canada in its own right – and "Ding Dong, Ding Dong", which charted just inside the top 40 in the main markets of America and Britain but was a top ten hit in Europe. In comparison, Shaved Fish had contained "Happy Xmas (War Is Over)", "Mother" and "Woman Is the Nigger of the World", singles which, on the US Billboard Hot 100, respectively: did not chart at all; peaked at number 43; and reached number 57. (Note: "Happy Xmas" did place on America's other national singles charts over the 1971–72 holiday season, however. Cashbox listed the song at number 36 and Record World at number 28.) On Blast from Your Past, the non-album B-side "Early 1970" was included, as were "I'm the Greatest" (an album track never released as a single) and "Beaucoups of Blues", which peaked at number 87 in the United States. On those terms, Harrison had the popular 1971 B-sides "Apple Scruffs" and "Deep Blue"; "Ding Dong", which peaked at number 36 on Billboard; and highly regarded album tracks such as "All Things Must Pass", "Beware of Darkness" and "Living in the Material World". (Note: In the case of "Apple Scruffs" and "Deep Blue" (B-sides, respectively, to "What Is Life" and "Bangla Desh"), each song had gained further notice when radio programmers "flipped" the single and opted to play the secondary side. In addition, "Apple Scruffs" and "What Is Life" were listed as a double A-side when the single topped Australia's Go-Set National Top 60 in May 1971.) Commentators have remarked also on the brevity of Starr's album, at just 30 minutes in length, whereas Capitol felt the need to achieve a running time of 45 minutes for the Harrison compilation.

== Album artwork ==
The North American and British versions of the album were released with different covers. In the United States and Canada, the front and back cover had small black-and-white pictures of Harrison against an image of the cosmos; Roy Kohara of Capitol was responsible for art design, as he had been for Extra Texture and the Lennon and Starr compilations, while the illustrations were the work of Michael Bryan. Rodriguez describes this choice of sleeve as "bizarre" and notes the use of an outdated, "rather dour-looking" image of Harrison. Some people have pointed out the resemblance of the line drawing around the photo of Harrison to a middle finger, though it's unclear whether this was intentional.

The UK edition contained Bob Cato's colour photo of Harrison sitting in front of an antique car, with art direction for the package being credited to Cream designs. The international CD release of the album uses the latter cover. The inner sleeve of the original LP in Britain contained a picture by Michael Putland, showing Harrison on a wintry beach in Cannes, where he was attending the Midem music-industry trade fair in January 1976. A third front-cover option came with MFP's budget reissue during the 1980s, which reproduced Harrison's 1968 White Album portrait.

== Release ==
Capitol Records released The Best of George Harrison on 8 November 1976 in America, with the catalogue number Capitol ST 11578. The UK issue, as PAS 10011 on EMI's Parlophone label, followed on 20 November. Among Beatles-related releases at the time, the compilation's arrival coincided not only with that of Thirty Three & ⅓, but also with McCartney's Wings over America triple live album; in addition, EMI belatedly issued the Beatles' 1967 Capitol release Magical Mystery Tour in December 1976, after that album had long proved a popular import in Britain. Writing in the NME in November, Bob Woffinden commented that sales of Thirty Three & ⅓ were sure to be "adversely affected by the almost simultaneous release – next week in fact – of [The Best of George Harrison]". According to author Peter Doggett, this calculated scheduling by Capitol/EMI meant that Harrison "would remain a staunch opponent" of the record companies in the concurrent litigation between Apple and its former manager, Allen Klein.

In the US, with Harrison actively promoting Thirty Three & ⅓ and enjoying some of his best reviews in years, the compilation reached number 31 on the Billboard Top LPs & Tape chart. It was certified gold by the Recording Industry Association of America (RIAA) on 15 February 1977, for sales of over 500,000 units. By the end of 1977, it was the only one of the three former Beatles' compilation albums to have received gold certification by the RIAA.

Like Starr's 1975 compilation, The Best of George Harrison failed to place on the UK's Top 60 Albums Chart. EMI, in an attempt to capitalise on recent publicity from the ruling on Bright Tunes' plagiarism suit against Harrison, reissued "My Sweet Lord" (backed with "What Is Life") as a single on 24 December 1976.

=== CD release and demand following Harrison's death ===
Together with All Things Must Pass, The Best of George Harrison was among the first of Harrison's albums to be issued on compact disc, in 1987. (Note: The release took place on 18 May that year in Britain, but was delayed until March 1988 in the United States. Due to this delay, Cloud Nine in fact became the first Harrison album to appear on CD in the US, following that studio album's release in November 1987.) According to Madinger and Easter, the UK edition of the CD was sonically superior to the US issue, due to the application of No-Noise processing on the remasters for the American market.

Following Harrison's death in November 2001 – and with little of his back catalogue readily available apart from the recently issued All Things Must Pass: 30th Anniversary Edition – the compilation became highly sought after by fans of the artist. In America, it peaked at number 9 on Billboard's Top Pop Catalog listings, on 29 December 2001, and number 15 on the magazine's Top Internet Albums. It also belatedly placed on the UK Albums Chart, at number 100, in January 2002.

Despite the 2009 compilation Let It Roll: Songs by George Harrison and the 2005 reissue of the Concert for Bangladesh live album, The Best of George Harrison remained the only CD release featuring pop's first-ever charity single, "Bangla Desh", until 2014. (Note: In July 2011, the song was made available as an iTunes-exclusive download as part of The Concert for Bangladesh, however.) In September that year, the song appeared as a bonus track on the Apple Years 1968–75 reissue of Living in the Material World.

== Critical reception ==
=== Contemporary reviews ===
Professional ratings
Review scores
Source	Rating
Sounds	3/5 stars

[The Best of George Harrison] was just a slick marketing ploy, but hits packages flooded the market in 1976 ... In fact, Paul McCartney is now the only solo Beatle without such an album to his credit. The only reason is that he's the one Beatle still signed to Capitol, and thus still in charge of what they do and don't release.

— Michael Gross, Swank, May 1977

On release, Billboard's reviewer welcomed the compilation, writing: "Harrison's remarkable emergence to full artistic recognition after starting off as the most anonymous Beatle is documented right on this album of memorably beautiful hits." In Melody Maker, on the same page as his mixed review of Wings over America (which featured live versions of five of McCartney's Beatles-era songs), Ray Coleman provided another favourable assessment: "[Harrison is] a highly individual artist who always keeps creative musical company; it's a good album, essential for Harrison students who may not have all the records ..."

Writing in Swank magazine, Michael Gross recognised Capitol Records' "slick marketing ploy" but admired the music, the "final treat" being the availability of "Bangla Desh" for the first time on an album. In a review subtitled "All I Want for Christmas is No. 11578" (referring to the Capitol catalogue number), Larry Rohter of The Washington Post described the collection as "an absolute delight".

Although the album was generally well received, its content drew criticism from fans, who felt the overall effect diminished the significance of Harrison's solo career. In the 1977 edition of their book The Beatles: An Illustrated Record, Roy Carr and Tony Tyler summed up the implication: "George's 'Best Of'. Half Beatle, half Harisongs. But will there be a Volume II?" Nicholas Schaffner observed a couple of minor positives on this "half-baked" collection: "The Best of George Harrison does confirm that George's big production numbers from All Things Must Pass more than hold their own alongside the seven featured Beatles tunes ... And the album is undeniably better looking than Rock 'n' Roll Music." Bob Woffinden similarly found that Harrison's solo recordings matched the standard of the Beatles' tracks while noting that "Capitol's half-and-half arrangement ... made it look as though he was the only one of the four [former Beatles] with insufficient clout to warrant a 'Greatest Hits' comprised entirely of his own work." In his 1981 book Christgau's Record Guide: Rock Albums of the Seventies, Robert Christgau said the first side of "impressive" Beatles songs nonetheless revealed how Harrison's "voice begins to betray its weaknesses after a while", and he deemed the solo side "remarkably shoddy".

=== Retrospective assessment and legacy ===
Professional ratings
Review scores
Source	Rating
AllMusic	3.5/5 stars
Blender	3/5 stars
Christgau's Record Guide	B−
The Encyclopedia of Popular Music	3/5 stars
MusicHound Rock	3/5
The Rolling Stone Album Guide	3/5 stars
Uncut	3/5 stars

Reviewing the compilation for AllMusic in 2001, Bruce Eder described it as "a good but routine collection", while three years later Mac Randall wrote in The Rolling Stone Album Guide: "The Best of George Harrison takes half its contents from Beatles albums, which is a little insulting." In his April 2004 article on Harrison's solo releases, for Blender magazine, Paul Du Noyer said of the compilation: "Hard to fault so far as it goes and a good place to get the fine 1971 single 'Bangla Desh'."

Although compromises to the hits-only formula had been permitted on the Lennon and Starr albums, AllMusic editor Stephen Thomas Erlewine comments on the controversial choice of tracks: "But all this is down to a matter of timing and circumstance: Harrison needed to have a hits collection out in 1976, he didn't have enough big hits to fill out 13 tracks (even if he certainly had enough great album tracks to do so), and so the Fabs were brought in to fill in the cracks." Erlewine adds that "The result might be a little underwhelming in retrospect, but it's undeniably entertaining."

Writing for Rough Guides in 2006, Chris Ingham said Harrison was "rightly annoyed" with his former record company. Ingham added that, with the "excellent Volume II" (Best of Dark Horse 1976–1989) no longer in print, The Best of George Harrison was therefore the artist's only available compilation album and "hardly a satisfying one-stop sampler". Reviewing Let It Roll for the music website Popdose, in 2009, Jon Cummings wrote that "the compilation gods have never been kind to [Harrison]" and described the 1976 album as "downright insulting". In her role as compiler of Let It Roll, Harrison's widow Olivia said of The Best of George Harrison: "That album always bothered me ... I just thought that is really not fair and I think we have to put something in that place, and that's really what this [2009 compilation] is." In a 2018 review for Uncut, Peter Watts described the 1976 album as "pretty good listening, containing a stack of classic songs and demonstrating a seamless transition from Beatles to solo work (something that works best on the original vinyl) with no diminished quality across the whole". While commenting that it pales against the "stunning posthumous collections" subsequently issued by the Harrison estate, Watts recognises "deliberate sabotage" on EMI/Capitol's part in their timing the release to coincide with that of Thirty Three & ⅓ as well as Wings Over America and the UK release of the Beatles' Magical Mystery Tour LP.

Harrison biographer Elliot Huntley is scathing in his opinion of The Best of George Harrison, writing: "Had EMI [and Capitol] forgotten the great songs on All Things Must Pass?" The inclusion of Beatles material was a "completely unnecessary public humiliation" for Harrison, Huntley continues, giving the impression that Starr and Lennon's solo careers up to the end of 1975 had been more successful than his – "when, in reality, the opposite was the case". (Note: In Huntley's view, the record companies should have "gone the whole hog" and released a compilation dedicated to Harrison's Beatle songs, a collection that would have "certified how underrated Harrison's talent had been" within his former band.) In his book Fab Four FAQ 2.0, Robert Rodriguez likewise bemoans what he saw as EMI/Capitol's attempt to humiliate Harrison with a compilation that failed to reflect his standing as the most accomplished ex-Beatle during 1970–73. Rodriguez describes the company's efforts to "effectively sabotag[e]" Harrison's Thirty Three & ⅓ chart run as "a final touch worthy of Allen Klein".

== Track listing ==
All songs written by George Harrison.

Side one

All tracks performed by the Beatles and produced by George Martin, except track 6, which was produced by Phil Spector.

No.	Title	Original album	Length
1.	"Something"	Abbey Road, 1969	3:01
2.	"If I Needed Someone"	Rubber Soul, 1965	2:22
3.	"Here Comes the Sun"	Abbey Road	3:05
4.	"Taxman"	Revolver, 1966	2:37
5.	"Think for Yourself"	Rubber Soul	2:18
6.	"For You Blue"	Let It Be, 1970	2:31
7.	"While My Guitar Gently Weeps"	The Beatles, 1968	4:45

Side two

All tracks performed by George Harrison and produced either by himself or with Phil Spector.

No.	Title	Original album	Length
1.	"My Sweet Lord"	All Things Must Pass, 1970	4:38
2.	"Give Me Love (Give Me Peace on Earth)"	Living in the Material World, 1973	3:35
3.	"You"	Extra Texture (Read All About It), 1975	3:41
4.	"Bangla Desh"	Non-album single, 1971	3:57
5.	"Dark Horse"	Dark Horse, 1974	3:53
6.	"What Is Life"	All Things Must Pass	4:17

== Charts and certifications ==
=== Chart positions ===
Original release

Chart (1976–77)	Position
Australian Kent Music Report	59
Austrian Albums Chart	25
Canadian RPM Top Albums	50
Japanese Oricon Albums Chart	51
US Billboard Top LPs & Tape	31
US Cashbox Top 100 Albums	29
US Record World Album Chart	33

Posthumous chart appearances

Chart (2001–02)	Position
US Billboard Top Internet Albums	15
US Billboard Top Pop Catalog	9
UK Albums Chart	100

=== Certifications ===
Region	Certification	Certified units/sales
United Kingdom (BPI)	Gold	100,000^{*}
United States (RIAA)	Gold	500,000^{^}
^{*} Sales figures based on certification alone.^{^} Shipments figures based on certification alone.

== Sources ==
- Badman, Keith (2001), The Beatles Diary Volume 2: After the Break-Up 1970–2001, London: Omnibus Press, ISBN 0-7119-8307-0.
- Bogdanov, Vladimir; Woodstra, Chris; Erlewine, Stephen Thomas, eds. (2001), All Music Guide: The Definitive Guide to Popular Music (4th ed.), San Francisco, CA: Backbeat Books, ISBN 0-87930-627-0.
- Brackett, Nathan; Hoard, Christian, eds. (2004), The New Rolling Stone Album Guide (4th ed.), New York, NY: Fireside/Simon & Schuster, ISBN 0-7432-0169-8.
- Carr, Roy; Tyler, Tony (1978), The Beatles: An Illustrated Record, London: Trewin Copplestone Publishing, ISBN 0-450-04170-0.
- Castleman, Harry; Podrazik, Walter J. (1976), All Together Now: The First Complete Beatles Discography 1961–1975, New York, NY: Ballantine Books, ISBN 0-345-25680-8.
- Clayson, Alan (2003), George Harrison, London: Sanctuary, ISBN 1-86074-489-3.
- Clayson, Alan (2003), Ringo Starr, London: Sanctuary, ISBN 1-86074-488-5.
- Doggett, Peter (2011), You Never Give Me Your Money: The Beatles After the Breakup, New York, NY: It Books, ISBN 978-0-06-177418-8.
- The Editors of Rolling Stone (2002), Harrison, New York, NY: Rolling Stone Press/Simon & Schuster, ISBN 0-7432-3581-9.
- Frontani, Michael (2009), "The Solo Years", in Kenneth Womack (ed.), The Cambridge Companion to the Beatles, Cambridge, UK: Cambridge University Press, ISBN 978-1-139-82806-2, pp. 153–82.
- Graff, Gary; Durchholz, Daniel, eds. (1999), MusicHound Rock: The Essential Album Guide, Farmington Hills, MI: Visible Ink Press, ISBN 1-57859-061-2.
- Harrison, Olivia (2011), George Harrison: Living in the Material World, New York, NY: Abrams, ISBN 978-1-4197-0220-4.
- Hunt, Chris, ed. (2005), NME Originals: Beatles – The Solo Years 1970–1980, London: IPC Ignite!.
- Huntley, Elliot J. (2006), Mystical One: George Harrison – After the Break-up of the Beatles, Toronto, ON: Guernica Editions, ISBN 1-55071-197-0.
- Ingham, Chris (2006), The Rough Guide to the Beatles (2 ed.), London: Rough Guides/Penguin, ISBN 978-1-84836-525-4.
- Inglis, Ian (2010), The Words and Music of George Harrison, Santa Barbara, CA: Praeger, ISBN 978-0-313-37532-3.
- Kent, David (1993), Australian Chart Book 1970–1992, St Ives, NSW: Australian Chart Book, ISBN 0-646-11917-6.
- Larkin, Colin (2011), The Encyclopedia of Popular Music (5th ed.), London: Omnibus Press, ISBN 978-0-85712-595-8.
- Lavezzoli, Peter (2006), The Dawn of Indian Music in the West, New York, NY: Continuum, ISBN 0-8264-2819-3.
- Leng, Simon (2006), While My Guitar Gently Weeps: The Music of George Harrison, Milwaukee, WI: Hal Leonard, ISBN 1-4234-0609-5.
- Madinger, Chip; Easter, Mark (2000), Eight Arms to Hold You: The Solo Beatles Compendium, Chesterfield, MO: 44.1 Productions, ISBN 0-615-11724-4.
- Riley, Tim (1988), Tell Me Why: A Beatles Commentary, New York, NY: Knopf/Vintage, ISBN 978-0-394-55061-9.
- Rodriguez, Robert (2010), Fab Four FAQ 2.0: The Beatles' Solo Years 1970–1980, Milwaukee, WI: Hal Leonard, ISBN 978-0-87930-968-8.
- Schaffner, Nicholas (1978), The Beatles Forever, New York, NY: McGraw-Hill, ISBN 0-07-055087-5.
- Shankar, Ravi; Harrison, George (2010), Collaborations (Accompanying book), produced by Olivia Harrison; package design by Drew Lorimer & Olivia Harrison, Dark Horse Records.
- Shankar, Ravi (2007), My Music, My Life, San Rafael, CA: Mandala Publishing, ISBN 978-1-60109-005-8.
- Spizer, Bruce (2005), The Beatles Solo on Apple Records, New Orleans, LA: 498 Productions, ISBN 0-9662649-5-9.
- Woffinden, Bob (1981), The Beatles Apart, London: Proteus, ISBN 0-906071-89-5.
