= You (George Harrison song) =

1975 single by George Harrison

- UK picture sleeve

Single by George Harrison

from the album Extra Texture (Read All About It)
- B-side: "World of Stone"
- Released: 12 September 1975
- Genre: Pop, soul
- Length: 3:44
- Label: Apple
- Songwriter: George Harrison
- Producers: George Harrison; Phil Spector (uncredited)

George Harrison singles chronology
| "Ding Dong, Ding Dong" (1974) | "You" (1975) | "This Guitar (Can't Keep from Crying)" (1975) |

Alternative cover
- US picture sleeve

"A Bit More of You"

Song by George Harrison

from the album Extra Texture (Read All About It)
- Released: 22 September 1975
- Genre: Pop, soul
- Length: 0:45
- Label: Apple
- Songwriter: George Harrison
- Producers: George Harrison; Phil Spector (uncredited)

"You" is a song by the English musician George Harrison, released as the opening track of his 1975 album Extra Texture (Read All About It). It was also the album's lead single, becoming a top 20 hit in America and reaching number 9 in Canada. A 45-second instrumental portion of the song, titled "A Bit More of You", appears on Extra Texture also, opening side two of the original LP format. Harrison wrote "You" in 1970 as a song for Ronnie Spector, formerly of the Ronettes, and wife of Harrison's All Things Must Pass co-producer Phil Spector. The composition reflects Harrison's admiration for 1960s American soul/R&B, particularly Motown.

In February 1971, Ronnie Spector recorded "You" in London for a proposed solo album on the Beatles' Apple record label, but the recording remained unissued. Four years later, Harrison returned to this backing track while making his final album for Apple Records, in Los Angeles. The released recording features the 1971 contributions from Leon Russell, Jim Gordon and others, with further instrumentation and vocals overdubbed in 1975, notably a series of saxophone solos by Jim Horn. On release, the song was well received by the majority of music critics, who viewed it as a return to form for Harrison after his disappointing 1974 North American tour and the accompanying Dark Horse album. Dave Marsh of Rolling Stone hailed it as Harrison's best work since his 1970–71 hit song "My Sweet Lord"; author Ian Inglis describes "You" as "a near-perfect pop song".

Capitol Records included "You" as one of just six Harrison solo hits, alongside compositions of his performed with the Beatles, on the 1976 compilation The Best of George Harrison. For the first time since the debut CD release of Extra Texture in the early 1990s, "You" was remastered, along with its parent album, as part of Harrison's 2014 Apple Years reissues.

== Background and composition ==
George Harrison's admiration for American soul/R&B acts dated back to the early 1960s, to singles by Doris Troy, Marvin Gaye, Mary Wells and others. A similar influence on him and his fellow Beatles was that era's girl group sound, as reflected in the band's choice of cover versions during 1962–63. In 1969, while producing Billy Preston's debut album on Apple Records, Harrison worked with Doris Troy in London and signed her to the label as a recording artist, songwriter and producer. Another of his favourite female vocalists was Ronnie Spector – formerly known as Veronica Bennett, lead singer of girl group the Ronettes until 1967, and latterly married to American producer Phil Spector. After co-producing Harrison's All Things Must Pass triple album in 1970, following the break-up of the Beatles, Spector was granted an unofficial role as head of A&R for Apple Records, and had previously insisted that his wife record for the label. That year, Harrison wrote the soul-inspired "You" as what he later termed "a Ronettes sort of song", specifically for Ronnie Spector.

The main lyrics – "I ... love ... you" and "You ... love ... me", in verses one and two, respectively – make it one of Harrison's simplest compositions. Author Ian Inglis comments that Harrison's lyrics here recall the Beatles' use of personal pronouns in songs such as "Love Me Do", "From Me to You" and "She Loves You" to effectively "include the listener in the song's narrative".

A deviation from these lines occurs only with the repeated bridges:

And when I'm holding you, what a feeling
Seems so good to be true
That I'm telling you all that I must be dreaming.

Harrison musical biographer Simon Leng notes the importance of soul music in Harrison's solo career during the 1970s and views "You" as a song that most obviously demonstrates the influence of Motown on its composer. (Note: Other examples of what Leng terms "Harrison's Motown tributes" include "What Is Life" and "Don't Let Me Wait Too Long".) Inglis suggests that Harrison's former Beatles bandmate Paul McCartney adopted part of the melody of "You" for his 1976 hit single with Wings, "Silly Love Songs".

== Recording ==
=== 1971 basic track ===
According to Leng, Harrison taped demos of "You" during the lengthy recording sessions for All Things Must Pass. The sessions for a proposed Ronnie Spector solo album began at London's Abbey Road Studios on 2 February 1971, with Harrison and Phil Spector again co-producing and Phil McDonald as recording engineer.

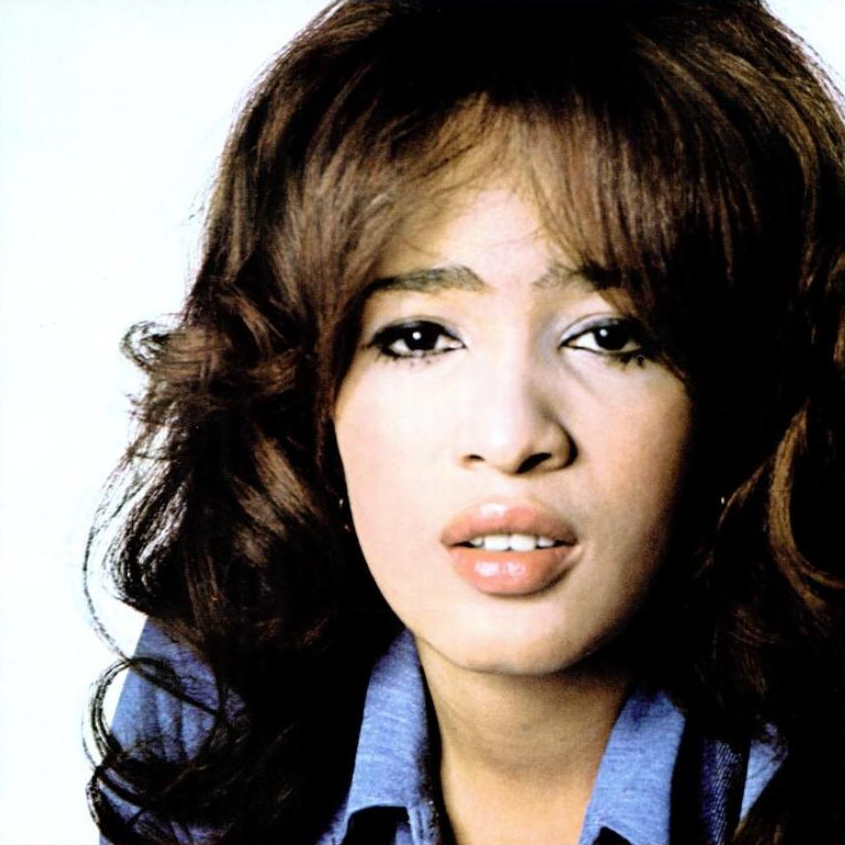
Ronnie Spector, pictured in 1971

Since the Ronettes' break-up in early 1967, Ronnie Spector had worked only sporadically, and she later claimed to have been a virtual prisoner in her husband's 23-room Los Angeles mansion during this period. She flew in from California for the sessions, which featured three musicians who had been part of the so-called "blue-eyed soul school" of the late 1960s, via their association with Delaney & Bonnie: multi-instrumentalist Leon Russell on piano, Jim Gordon on drums, and Carl Radle on bass. (Note: Before then, Russell and Gordon were members of the Wrecking Crew, a pool of LA-based musicians who regularly contributed to Phil Spector's classic 1960s recordings, as well as to those by the Beach Boys, the Byrds and other acts. Following their work together in Delaney & Bonnie, Gordon and Radle provided the rhythm section for Derek & the Dominos, whose brief existence ended three months after these sessions in February 1971.) In addition to Harrison, who supplied guitar, another participant was Gary Wright, on keyboards, reprising his role on All Things Must Pass. For two days, this group of musicians taped the basic tracks for "You" and five other songs written or co-written by Harrison, with Ronnie Spector recording guide vocals only. The sessions then "broke down", according to authors Chip Madinger and Mark Easter, due to "Phil's health issues", which had similarly interrupted the recording of All Things Must Pass in 1970.

Despite the fact that "You" was tailor-made for his wife, Phil Spector opted not to issue the song as her comeback single; he had likewise held back recordings by the Ronettes and the Crystals, another act signed to his label, Philles Records, in the 1960s. With the solo-album plan abruptly abandoned, another Harrison original from the sessions, "Try Some, Buy Some", was completed and selected for release as a Ronnie Spector single on Apple. A minor hit in America only, that song's disappointing commercial reception led to the cancellation of a second single, which was to be "You". (Note: Two instrumental versions of "You" from the February 1971 sessions, one of which is the basic track to which Harrison returned in 1975, are available unofficially on the bootleg compilation The Harri-Spector Show.)

=== 1975 overdubs ===
Four years after the Abbey Road sessions, Harrison revisited "You" while completing his final album for Apple Records, the soul-influenced Extra Texture (Read All About It), at A&M Studios in Los Angeles. His standing with music critics had recently plummeted following a North American tour with Ravi Shankar in November–December 1974 and his accompanying album, Dark Horse. These two projects had been marred by Harrison's laryngitis-ravaged singing voice; in addition, a number of concert reviewers had condemned Harrison for refusing to indulge the public's nostalgia for the Beatles, and for his on-stage spiritual pronouncements. (Note: Adding to the high expectations surrounding these concerts, the Harrison–Shankar tour was the first North American tour by an ex-Beatle and the first there by a former member of the band since 1966. Beatles biographer Peter Doggett compares the shock caused by Harrison's apparent disdain for the band's legacy to that created by John Lennon's statement "I don't believe in Beatles", in the lyrics to his 1970 song "God".) Looking to rehabilitate himself with critics and his audience in early 1975, Harrison had what author Robert Rodriguez describes as "at least one ace in the commercial hole ... the Motown-esque 'You'".

Harrison recorded his own lead vocal onto the 1971 basic track, as he had done earlier with "Try Some, Buy Some", for Living in the Material World (1973). On 31 May 1975, further overdubs were carried out on "You", comprising a second drum part, by Jim Keltner; tenor sax solos from Jim Horn; and ambient keyboards, played by David Foster. Harrison said that Horn's saxophone playing on the track was "one of the nicest rock-n-roll sounds I've heard in years". The overdubs added to the song's radio-friendly qualities, particularly through the use of ARP String Synthesizer, but Madinger and Easter note that Keltner's drum part, which is higher in the mix than Gordon's and was played in half-time, produces an effect whereby the song's tempo appears to be slower than on the 1971 recording. With a significant amount of post-production work having been carried out in Los Angeles, Spector did not receive a co-producer's credit for "You" as he had for Harrison's version of "Try Some, Buy Some".

In September 1975 Harrison told BBC Radio 1's Paul Gambaccini that it was "such a good backing track" originally, yet he had forgotten about its existence until coming across the tape years later. In a 1987 interview, Harrison acknowledged the difficulty he had in singing the song in so high a key; "it was recorded in Ronnie's register," he explains in his 1980 autobiography, "a bit high for me." Although Ronnie Spector's name did not appear in the album credits, snippets of her 1971 guide vocal remain on Harrison's released recording. Spector's voice can be heard intermittently from the two-minute mark onwards, with her signature "woh oh-oh oh-oh"s audible during the song's playout.

== Release ==
An upbeat pop song in a similar vein to Harrison's 1971 hit "What Is Life", "You" was the most obvious choice for a single off Extra Texture. It was released in advance of the album, backed by "World of Stone", on 12 September 1975 in Britain (as Apple R 6007) and three days later in the United States (as Apple 1884). The picture sleeve in Britain featured a photo of a smiling Harrison taken on stage by 1974 tour photographer Henry Grossman; the US picture sleeve incorporated Roy Kohara's humorous design for the album, showing blue lettering on a vivid orange background. In another example of the upbeat mood that was otherwise lacking in the musical content of Extra Texture, the single's face labels showed the familiar Apple Records logo as an apple core, a pun on the demise of the company.

In the UK, where Harrison had undertaken promotional activities for the first time for Extra Texture, "You" was Radio 1's Record of the Week, guaranteeing it substantial airplay. The song peaked no higher than Harrison's previous hit there, "Ding Dong, Ding Dong", at number 38, however. (Note: On the national chart compiled by Melody Maker, the magazine listed the single at number 29.) As with his Dark Horse singles, "You" performed better in America, where it held the number 20 position for two weeks on the Billboard Hot 100. On the US charts compiled by Cash Box and Record World, the single peaked at number 19 and number 39, respectively.

The song served as both the opener for Extra Texture as well as, in the form of a 45-second instrumental portion titled "A Bit More of You", the first track on side two of the original LP. Harrison biographer Dale Allison dismisses this reprise with the words "It's filler", while Leng suggests its purpose was to "fashion a soul mood" for the song that follows, the pop-soul ballad "Can't Stop Thinking About You". The full version of "You" appears on the 1976 compilation The Best of George Harrison as one of only six selections from Harrison's solo career up to the end of 1975. (Note: Following the expiration of the individual Beatles' recording contracts with the Apple label's distributors, EMI and Capitol Records, in January 1976, these record companies were free to combine Beatles and post-Beatles work on the same album. The Best of George Harrison was the only example of such a compilation.) Having last been remastered for the 1991–92 CD release of Extra Texture, the song was remastered for inclusion on Harrison's Apple Years 1968–75 reissues, released in September 2014.

== Critical reception ==
=== Contemporary reviews ===
After the so-called "Dark Hoarse" debacle in 1974, and with his singing voice now healed, music critics viewed "You" as a return to form for Harrison. The tone of the song suggested that, in the words of Robert Rodriguez, "the irritable, gravel-voiced mystic on tour the previous year had been but an illusion" – an impression that was supported by the lightheartedness evident in the parent album's artwork and Harrison's self-deprecating "Ohnothimagen" producer's moniker. (Note: Originally intended as the title of Harrison's 1975 studio album, "Ohnothimagen" was a deliberate misspelling of "Oh, not him again", and served as both a send-up of Harrison's serious image and an acknowledgement of his critical unpopularity at the time.)

Dave Marsh of Rolling Stone wrote of the song: "'You,' the single which preceded Extra Texture ... is not only the best thing he has done since 1971's 'My Sweet Lord,' but also promised some of the prestige and credibility he lost with last year's sourvoiced album (Dark Horse) and fizzled tour." In the NME, Neil Spencer opined: "'You' seems at least to proclaim a return to energy. It has the kind of semi-Spector production that was spread all over All Things Must Pass. It bounds along OK, Harrison's double-tracked vocals gasp convincingly, and it deserves to be the hit that it will be."

Reviewing for Melody Maker, Ray Coleman highlighted Harrison's vocal and the musical contributions from Horn and Russell, and said: "It's a dead cert disco smash, his finest single since 'My Sweet Lord'." Coleman added that the lyrics were "deceptively simple" since, as with Harrison's 1969 composition "Something", "they say a lot by saying a little." Billboard called "You" a "catchy cut highlighted by his strongest singing in some time", saying that it had an effective hook and sounded like it could have fitted on All Things Must Pass. Cash Box said the song had a "wall-of-sound approach a la 'What Is Love' (the Bangladesh concert sound)" and predicted high sales for the single, but added, "we're still looking for the next change from Harrison the musician." Record World said "George once again shows his flair for the love ballad. With extra texture provided by a stellar cast of backing musicians headed by Tom Scott, who takes a great saxophone break, George is once again a chart contender." Writing later in the 1970s, in their book The Beatles: An Illustrated Record, Roy Carr and Tony Tyler dismissed "You" with the words: "Doleful, lacklustre, [with] would-be singalongs which quite fail to arouse."

=== Retrospective assessment and legacy ===
In his review of Harrison's 1987 album Cloud Nine, for Creem magazine, Bill Holdship included the song among the "scattered brilliant moments" of Harrison's career post-All Things Must Pass, saying: "'You' from the Extra Texture LP sounds like punk (depends on your definition) pop as Phil Spector might've done it, and remains a killer to this day. And when I saw Harrison perform in 1974, he put on a far better show than the one I would later see Wings do." Writing in the posthumous Rolling Stone Press tribute, Harrison, in 2002, Mikal Gilmore similarly identified "You" as a highlight of the artist's work in the mid to late 1970s. In the same publication, Greg Kot deemed it "a terrific single", adding: "Its roaring Wall of Sound arrangement suits Harrison well, right down to its closing quote of the Ronettes' 'Be My Baby'." In a January 2002 review of Harrison's solo releases, for Goldmine magazine, Dave Thompson described the song as "magnificent".

AllMusic's Lindsay Planer admires it as a "propulsive and rocking love song ... backed by one of Harrison's most liberated and driving melodies"; Planer also notes the "nonstop powerhouse instrumental track", driven by Gordon and Keltner's "double-barreled percussive assault". Richard Ginell, also writing for AllMusic, calls the song an "instantly winning" single and album-opener, and rates it among the best tracks of Harrison's solo career.

Among reviewers of Harrison's 2014 Apple Years reissues, Walter Tunis of the Lexington Herald-Leader considers Extra Texture to be "a delight", from the opening, "brightly orchestrated pop of You" through to the closing track, "His Name Is Legs". Conversely, Paul Trynka of Classic Rock says that the song "sounds dull today, with its dated sessioneer funk", whereas "it's the confessional songs [on Extra Texture] that have worn well."

Simon Leng views it as "a great pop record", adding: "'You' has the same surging spirit as [Motown classics] "Dancing in the Street" and "Heat Wave" and, as the lyrics are full of boy-meets-girl triteness, the groove is what carries it." Ian Inglis identifies the song's strengths as its lyrical simplicity, a "soaring, galloping melody ... [that] encapsulates the joy of reciprocated love and the liberation of rock 'n' roll at its most exuberant", and the quality of the musicianship on the recording, particularly Jim Horn's contribution. Inglis concludes: "Even the slight unease [Harrison] has in striving to maintain some of the higher notes cannot detract from what is, quite simply, a near-perfect pop song."

Two years after Harrison's death from cancer in November 2001, American singer-songwriter Lisa Mychols covered "You" for the multi-artist compilation He Was Fab: A Loving Tribute to George Harrison – a reading that Lindsay Planer describes as "affective" and a highlight of the album. At the New York Celebrates George Harrison Concert on 26 February 2011, in honour of what would have been Harrison's 68th birthday, New York band the 253 Boys performed "You" in a medley with his Cloud Nine track "This Is Love".

== Personnel ==
- George Harrison – vocals*, electric guitar, acoustic guitar*, backing vocals*
- Ronnie Spector – vocals
- Jim Horn – saxophone*
- Leon Russell – piano
- Gary Wright – electric piano
- David Foster – organ*, string synthesizer*
- Carl Radle – bass
- Jim Gordon – drums, tambourine
- Jim Keltner – drums*

* denotes May–June 1975 overdubs

== Chart positions ==
| Chart (1975) | Peak position |
|---|---|
| Canadian RPM 100 Singles | 9 |
| Japanese Oricon Singles Chart | 66 |
| New Zealand Singles Chart | 35 |
| Swedish Topplistan Singles | 19 |
| UK Singles Chart | 38 |
| US Billboard Hot 100 | 20 |
| US Cash Box Top 100 | 19 |
| US Record World Singles Chart | 39 |
| West German Media Control Singles Chart | 43 |

== Sources ==
- Dale C. Allison Jr., The Love There That's Sleeping: The Art and Spirituality of George Harrison, Continuum (New York, NY, 2006; ISBN 978-0-8264-1917-0).
- Keith Badman, The Beatles Diary Volume 2: After the Break-Up 1970–2001, Omnibus Press (London, 2001; ISBN 0-7119-8307-0).
- Roy Carr & Tony Tyler, The Beatles: An Illustrated Record, Trewin Copplestone Publishing (London, 1978; ISBN 0-450-04170-0).
- Harry Castleman & Walter J. Podrazik, All Together Now: The First Complete Beatles Discography 1961–1975, Ballantine Books (New York, NY, 1976; ISBN 0-345-25680-8).
- Alan Clayson, George Harrison, Sanctuary (London, 2003; ISBN 1-86074-489-3).
- Peter Doggett, You Never Give Me Your Money: The Beatles After the Breakup, It Books (New York, NY, 2011; ISBN 978-0-06-177418-8).
- The Editors of Rolling Stone, Harrison, Rolling Stone Press/Simon & Schuster (New York, NY, 2002; ISBN 0-7432-3581-9).
- George Harrison, I Me Mine, Chronicle Books (San Francisco, CA, 2002; ISBN 0-8118-3793-9).
- Chris Hunt (ed.), NME Originals: Beatles – The Solo Years 1970–1980, IPC Ignite! (London, 2005).
- Elliot J. Huntley, Mystical One: George Harrison – After the Break-up of the Beatles, Guernica Editions (Toronto, ON, 2006; ISBN 1-55071-197-0).
- Ian Inglis, The Words and Music of George Harrison, Praeger (Santa Barbara, CA, 2010; ISBN 978-0-313-37532-3).
- Peter Lavezzoli, The Dawn of Indian Music in the West, Continuum (New York, NY, 2006; ISBN 0-8264-2819-3).
- Simon Leng, While My Guitar Gently Weeps: The Music of George Harrison, Hal Leonard (Milwaukee, WI, 2006; ISBN 1-4234-0609-5).
- Ian MacDonald, Revolution in the Head: The Beatles' Records and the Sixties, Pimlico (London, 1998; ISBN 0-7126-6697-4).
- Chip Madinger & Mark Easter, Eight Arms to Hold You: The Solo Beatles Compendium, 44.1 Productions (Chesterfield, MO, 2000; ISBN 0-615-11724-4).
- Robert Rodriguez, Fab Four FAQ 2.0: The Beatles' Solo Years, 1970–1980, Backbeat Books (Milwaukee, WI, 2010; ISBN 978-1-4165-9093-4).
- Patricia Romanowski & Holly George-Warren (eds), The New Rolling Stone Encyclopedia of Rock & Roll, Fireside/Rolling Stone Press (New York, NY, 1995; ISBN 0-684-81044-1).
- Nicholas Schaffner, The Beatles Forever, McGraw-Hill (New York, NY, 1978; ISBN 0-07-055087-5).
- Ronnie Spector with Vince Waldron, Be My Baby: How I Survived Mascara, Miniskirts, and Madness – Or, My Life as a Fabulous Ronette, New American Library (New York, NY, 2004; ISBN 0-451-41153-6).
- Bruce Spizer, The Beatles Solo on Apple Records, 498 Productions (New Orleans, LA, 2005; ISBN 0-9662649-5-9).
- Gary Tillery, Working Class Mystic: A Spiritual Biography of George Harrison, Quest Books (Wheaton, IL, 2011; ISBN 978-0-8356-0900-5).
- Richard Williams, Phil Spector: Out of His Head, Omnibus Press (London, 2003; ISBN 978-0-7119-9864-3).
- Bob Woffinden, The Beatles Apart, Proteus (London, 1981; ISBN 0-906071-89-5).
