= This Guitar (Can't Keep from Crying) =

1975 song by George Harrison

- German picture sleeve

Single by George Harrison

from the album Extra Texture (Read All About It)
- B-side: "Māya Love"
- Released: 8 December 1975 (US); 6 February 1976 (UK)
- Genre: Rock
- Length: 4:11 (album version); 3:49 (single edit)
- Label: Apple
- Songwriter: George Harrison
- Producer: George Harrison

George Harrison singles chronology
"You" (1975)	"This Guitar (Can't Keep from Crying)" (1975)	"This Song" (1976)

"This Guitar (Can't Keep from Crying)" is a song by English rock musician George Harrison, released on his 1975 studio album Extra Texture (Read All About It). Harrison wrote the song as a sequel to his popular Beatles composition "While My Guitar Gently Weeps", in response to the personal criticism he had received during and after his 1974 North American tour with Ravi Shankar, particularly from Rolling Stone magazine. An edit of "This Guitar" was issued as a single in December 1975, as the final release by Apple Records in its original incarnation. The single failed to chart in either the United States or Britain.

The song follows in a tradition established by singers such as Woody Guthrie and Pete Seeger, of attributing emotions and actions to a musical instrument. The lyrics also serve as an example of a dialogue that was commonplace during the 1970s between songwriters and music critics. Contributing to Harrison's sense of injustice in "This Guitar", he and his tour musicians believed that detractors had ignored the successful aspects of the 1974 shows – which blended rock, jazz, funk and Indian classical music – and had focused instead on his failure to pay due respect to the legacy of the Beatles. Rolling Stone's scathing assessment of Harrison's tour and accompanying album, Dark Horse, represented an about-face by the publication, previously one of his most vocal supporters, and led to Harrison's continued resentment towards the magazine over subsequent decades.

Harrison recorded "This Guitar (Can't Keep from Crying)" in Los Angeles during April and May 1975, a period marked by his post-tour despondency. The recording features guitar solos played by Harrison and American musician Jesse Ed Davis. The song serves as a rare guitar-oriented selection on the keyboard-heavy Extra Texture album, although David Foster, Gary Wright and Harrison all contributed keyboard parts to the track. "This Guitar" has traditionally received a mixed reception from reviewers, partly due to the inevitable comparisons with "While My Guitar Gently Weeps". Harrison re-recorded the song in 1992 with former Eurythmic Dave Stewart, who used it to promote his Platinum Weird project in 2006. This version appears as a bonus track on the 2014 Apple Years 1968–75 reissue of Extra Texture.

== Background and inspiration ==
George Harrison's stated aim for his North American tour with Indian musician Ravi Shankar, which took place from 2 November to 20 December 1974, was to offer concert-goers "another kind of experience" from the typical mid-1970s rock show. With its blending of Western rock, funk and jazz genres with Indian classical music, author Robert Rodriguez describes the result as a musical form "[that] one day would be called 'world music'". Of the critical reception given to the Harrison–Shankar venture, tour-wide, Rodriguez writes of the "genuine highlights that went mostly unreported", since: "Smaller press outlets without axes to grind tended to review the shows the best, whereas rock establishment coverage, such as Rolling Stone's, tended to spin the tour as something close to an unmitigated disaster ..."

It was all good ... It seemed like everyone who came enjoyed themselves totally. I thought the response couldn't have been warmer and more enthusiastic; people were thrilled to see [Harrison] on stage.

— Drummer Andy Newmark, 2003

Along with Harrison and band leader Tom Scott, tour musicians Jim Horn, Jim Keltner and Andy Newmark have each challenged the reliability of these negative reports, Horn declaring the Harrison–Shankar tour "one of the best I've been on". Concert-goers likewise questioned their accuracy; according to author Nicholas Schaffner, Beatles fanzine Strawberry Fields Forever had been "deluged with letters protesting the nasty reviews".

Everyone's first show has problems with sound and programming. In fact, the music [on this tour] is sensational ... and that's what pisses me off about [music journalist Ben Fong-Torres]. He travelled with us from Vancouver to LA, long after we'd made all the changes ...

— Tom Scott, December 1974, questioning the accuracy of a Rolling Stone feature article on the Harrison–Shankar tour

Harrison biographer Simon Leng describes this phenomenon as "one of the stranger episodes in rock music" and writes: "While the majority of reviews were positive, in some cases ecstatic, the 'given' view of the tour comes from the Rolling Stone articles." Chief among these was a feature by Ben Fong-Torres, titled "Lumbering in the Material World", covering the opening, West Coast portion of the tour. Feng-Torres condemned Harrison for refusing to pander to critics' and the public's nostalgia for the Beatles, and for the perilous state of his singing voice, after Harrison had contracted laryngitis while rushing to complete his new album during the tour rehearsals. (Note: The 1974 North American tour was not only Harrison's first tour as a solo artist, but also the first there by any of the Beatles since the band's 1966 visit. Writing in 1981, NME critic Bob Woffinden commented that, unlike in Britain where the Beatles' mystique had diminished after 1971, the band and its individual members were still revered in America during the mid 1970s. Adding to this widespread nostalgia was the successful Beatlefest convention, first held in New York in July 1974.) At the time, Scott voiced his objections to Fong-Torres' article for focusing excessively on the uneven opening concert at Vancouver's Pacific Coliseum. This piece was followed by Larry Sloman's article on the East Coast shows. As Harrison discovered soon after the tour, Sloman had submitted a favourable piece on the concerts but, to Sloman's annoyance, the magazine's editors revised it before publication. Harrison complained that Rolling Stone deliberately "edited everything positive out" about the shows. (Note: Speaking to Dave Herman of radio station WNEW-FM in April 1975, Harrison said that during the tour the writer had expressed his opposition to the publication's earlier position and his intention to correct this negative picture of the Harrison–Shankar concerts. Sloman recalled that when he subsequently explained the situation to Harrison, the latter told him: "I'm glad you sent me that [unedited] article, Larry. I thought you were an asshole and then I realize that it was Rolling Stone that was the asshole.")

Leng writes that "Testimony" on the Harrison–Shankar tour, and a "savagely personal" attack on Harrison, came with the magazine's review for his delayed Dark Horse album. Under the heading "Transcendental Mediocrity", Rolling Stone critic Jim Miller wrote of the "disastrous album" appearing "in the wake of his disastrous tour" – completing what Harrison biographer Elliot Huntley describes as the magazine's "volte-face" on an artist it had traditionally supported. (Note: In a December 2001 article for the San Francisco Chronicle, Fong-Torres wrote that his "Lumbering in the Material World" feature "drew the most negative mail in my dozen years at Rolling Stone".)

Harrison never completely forgave Rolling Stone for its treatment of the "Dark Horse Tour". While members of his 1974 tour group, including future wife Olivia Arias, have spoken of Harrison's defiant attitude towards the negative reviews, Leng states that he "reacted to them as personal attacks". Harrison wrote "This Guitar (Can't Keep from Crying)" while on holiday in Hawaii with Arias, in February 1975. He told Musician magazine in 1987 that the song "came about because the press and critics tried to nail me on the 1974–5 tour, [and] got really nasty".

== Composition ==
The song title is a play on that of his 1968 composition "While My Guitar Gently Weeps", released on the Beatles' White Album and performed by Harrison throughout the 1974 tour. While reviewers of the 1974 concerts had focused on his altering of the lyric to "While my guitar gently smiles" and "... tries to smile", Harrison told BBC Radio 1's Paul Gambaccini in September 1975 that it was a track that was consistently well received by audiences during the tour. Harrison described the new composition as "Son of 'Guitar Gently Weeps'".

I had a choice of cancelling the [1974] tour … or going out and singing hoarse. I always think people will give others more credit than they do, so I assumed they'd know I'm in bad voice but still feel the music's plentiful and good. I wrote that song about being stuck on a limb, and being down, but not out.

— George Harrison, 1987

Like the Beatles track, "This Guitar" is structured around short, minor-key verses (in this case, in the key of G minor) that conclude with the song title, rather than distinct choruses. Author Ian Inglis also notes the "evident similarity" between the melody of the two compositions. As with Harrison's lyrics for "While My Guitar Gently Weeps", Inglis writes, "This Guitar" follows in a tradition established by Woody Guthrie, Pete Seeger and Bo Diddley, of attributing emotions and actions to a musical instrument.

In a contemporary review, music journalist Ray Coleman said that the song's lyrics, together with the yearning quality of Harrison's singing and guitar playing on the track, "will raise questions about its relevance to his personal life". The song begins with the lines "Found myself out on a limb / But I'm happier than I've ever been", the second of which echoes Harrison's statement to Fong-Torres that he had never been as happy as he was now – in a band with Scott, Billy Preston and Willie Weeks, and as a servant of the Hindu god Krishna instead of living out the public's perception of him as "Beatle George". (Note: Referring to the completed recording, Inglis opines that, rather than happiness, "the bitterness in his vocal performance tells a different story.")

"This Guitar" conveys Harrison's intention to persevere despite the criticism he had received. In his brief discussion of the song in his autobiography, Harrison introduces the lyrics to verse two with a mention of the need to "struggle" through adversity, in an effort "to become better human beings":

Learned to get up when I fall
Can even climb Rolling Stone walls
This guitar can't keep from crying.

Commenting that Harrison was "bound to fight back against what he saw as unfair, malicious criticism", Leng views these and other lines in the song as typical of a dialogue then common in rock music, between artists and critics. Leng cites Joni Mitchell, Neil Young and John Lennon as other singer-songwriters who encouraged this dialogue and in some instances suffered for doing so. (Note: In his biography of Rolling Stone founding editor Jann Wenner, Joe Hagan says that Harrison's disdain for the magazine "put him in good company" in the mid 1970s – namely, Lennon, Mitchell, Bob Dylan and the Eagles.)

Theologian Dale Allison writes of Harrison's "deep hurt" being reflected in the lyrics to "This Guitar". The two bridge sections document the "unwarranted abuse that comes his way", Inglis writes, while typifying the theme that "[Harrison] is the guitar":

This here guitar can be quite sad
Can be high strung, sometimes gets mad
Can't understand or deal with hate
Responds much better to love.

After Harrison has named Rolling Stone as the main perpetrator of his anguish, Leng suggests that he is unable to sustain the previous "artifice", whereby the lyrics' shift in perspective from first-person to third-person represented the apparently "happy" private man versus the "wounded" musician, as "personified by his guitar". Instead, Harrison "flays his detractors" in the song's subsequent verses. These final verses contain the rhyming couplets "Thought by now you knew the score / You missed the point just like before" and "While you attack, create offence / I'll put it down to your ignorance". Music critic Lindsay Planer describes the lines as "suggesting that there is more to Harrison's music than is being taken into consideration by narrow-minded journalists".

== Recording ==
Harrison started recording his follow-up to Dark Horse, Extra Texture (Read All About It), in April 1975, while in Los Angeles working on business associated with his Dark Horse record label. Leng remarks on Harrison's "almost unseemly" haste in returning to a studio and suggests that his "bitterness and dismay" post-Dark Horse was evident on much of the recording. Early on in the sessions, during his radio interview with WNEW-FM's Dave Herman, Harrison bemoaned the abandoning of 1960s idealism within the music industry and related this to the critical backlash he had recently received, from people who were "just dropping apart at the seams with hate", adding: "I'm talking about Rolling Stone actually – talking about [founding editor] Jann Wenner."

Harrison recorded the basic track for "This Guitar (Can't Keep from Crying)" at A&M Studios in Hollywood between 21 April and 7 May. Harrison played 12-string acoustic guitar, with support from David Foster on piano, and sparse, floor tom-heavy drumming from Jim Keltner. Klaus Voormann, Harrison's regular bass player and a friend since the Beatles' Hamburg years, chose to not participate in many of the sessions for Extra Texture, later citing the abundance of cocaine and Harrison's "frame of mind when he was doing this album". Harrison overdubbed the song's bass part using an ARP synthesizer, while Gary Wright provided the ARP strings atmospherics, a sound that characterised his hit album The Dream Weaver around this time. (Note: As reproduced in the CD booklet accompanying the 2014 reissue of Extra Texture, the master-reel tracking sheet (dated 23 June 1975) also lists a Moog synthesizer bass part on "This Guitar". Only the "ARP bass" contribution appears in the album credits, however.) In the description of author Andrew Grant Jackson, the song's opening synthesizer part "wouldn't sound out of place in a '70s horror flick or a Death Wish sequel".

When discussing "This Guitar" with Paul Gambaccini in London, in September, Harrison described the song as "a cheap excuse to play some guitar". Harrison played the slide guitar parts throughout the track, including the closing solo. Leng identifies both "Pete Drake stylings" and the influence of "raga microtones" in Harrison's performance. The wah-effected guitar solo midway through the song was performed by Jesse Ed Davis, who, having first supported Harrison at the Concert for Bangladesh in August 1971, had since mirrored the ex-Beatle's guitar style on John Lennon's recent hit song "#9 Dream". Davis overdubbed his contribution to "This Guitar" on 5 June, the day before the Foster-arranged orchestral strings were recorded.

== Release ==
Japanese picture sleeve for "This Guitar", showing Harrison on stage in 1974

Extra Texture was released on Apple Records in September 1975, with "This Guitar (Can't Keep from Crying)" sequenced as the third track, between "The Answer's at the End" and Harrison's Smokey Robinson tribute "Ooh Baby (You Know That I Love You)". Aside from the well-received lead single, "You", the album offered little in the way of "hook-laden potential hit[s]", author Bruce Spizer writes, leading to "This Guitar" being chosen as the follow-up single. (Note: Beatles biographer Alan Clayson sees "This Guitar" as the "soundest choice" for a second single after "You", most of which Harrison had recorded with producer Phil Spector in 1971, given the downbeat mood of Extra Texture. Leng expresses surprise that "Can't Stop Thinking About You" was not selected for release as an A-side.) Apple issued the single on 8 December in America, with the Apple catalogue number 1885. For this release, the song was edited down to a running time of 3:49, by fading out early during the closing solo. The B-side was the Dark Horse track "Māya Love", a choice that underlined the paucity of radio-friendly selections on Extra Texture, according to Spizer. The single's UK release (as Apple R 6012) was delayed until 6 February 1976.

"This Guitar" was the final release for the original Apple record label, which the Beatles had launched in 1968 as a business enterprise aligned with utopian ideology. The record's face labels reverted to the generic Apple design rather than use the customised design adopted for "You" and Extra Texture, which included a vivid orange and blue colour scheme and an eaten-away apple core in place of the standard Apple logo. In America and Britain, "This Guitar" was available only in a plain sleeve. Among the alternative packaging available in other markets, the rare Japanese picture sleeve incorporated the colour scheme from the parent album, surrounding an image of Harrison on stage during the 1974 tour. The picture was taken by tour photographer Henry Grossman, who worked extensively with the Beatles in the 1960s. Harrison did no promotion for the single, but his guest appearance on comedian Eric Idle's Rutland Weekend Television 1975 Christmas special, singing the purpose-written "The Pirate Song", heralded a return to form for him in 1976.

"This Guitar (Can't Keep from Crying)" failed to place on any of the three US singles charts or the UK's official singles chart, then just a top 50. It was Harrison's first single to miss the Billboard Hot 100, where all his previous releases had charted no lower than number 36, and the first single by a former Beatle not to chart at all in the United States. Rodriguez attributes its lack of success mainly to the fact that Apple was "[r]unning on fumes" by this point and the company's promotion for the single was nonexistent. By the time the single appeared in Britain, Harrison's involvement with Apple was officially over, following his signing with A&M-distributed Dark Horse Records in January 1976. Spizer writes: "It was a sad end and [a] far cry from the success of Apple's first release, 'Hey Jude'." (Note: Apple Records was revived in the mid 1990s, with considerable success, for the Beatles' Live at the BBC compilation and the Anthology project.)

== Critical reception ==
=== Contemporary reviews ===
Discussing Extra Texture in his 1977 book The Beatles Forever, Nicholas Schaffner wrote of Harrison's "worldly critics" responding "like bulls to a red flag" to "This Guitar" and other "treatises on how reviewers always 'miss the point'". Schaffner added: "True, the critics had been unfair, even vicious. But one could only hope George would rise above them, and produce a work good enough to fake them all out. Which is exactly what he would do a year later with Thirty-Three and a Third." Rodriguez writes that "Critics by nature tended to regard the Beatles' catalog as sacrosanct" and therefore "dissed [Harrison] for producing a sequel to 'While My Guitar Gently Weeps'".

In another unfavourable review from Rolling Stone, Dave Marsh dismissed much of the album's first side as "padded subterfuge" while opining that "there just isn't compensation here for the failed promise of 'This Guitar (Can't Keep from Crying)'". NME writers Roy Carr and Tony Tyler said that, in comparison with the Beatles track, Harrison's "often-impressively lachrymose guitar falls short of true grief-stricken form here", adding: "The lack of a tune doesn't help." Conversely, Record World's single reviewer wrote that Harrison "hits the mark with this edited extra textural ballad" and highlighted Wright's ARP strings among the "superb accompaniment".

In his review for Melody Maker, Ray Coleman admired "This Guitar" as a "scorching track" with a lyrical message that he deemed "Hot, pertinent, touching". Cash Box said that Harrison "treads in the same musical direction that he has for the last couple of years: bending the strings so that they whine in an inflated blues style instead of screaming/squealing like some of Harrison's wilder-minded contemporaries", adding that "George’s vocal is very complimentary and the words are gently serious."

=== Retrospective assessment ===
[Harrison] criticizes Rolling Stone for missing the point of what he was doing, then tells himself it's because of their ignorance. Probably no one bitched more about their critics than the solo Beatles until Public Enemy and Eminem came along.

— Author Andrew Grant Jackson

AllMusic's Richard Ginell views "This Guitar" as an "attractive" sequel to "While My Guitar Gently Weeps" and includes it among Harrison's best compositions from his solo career. Andrew Grant Jackson features the track in his book Still the Greatest: The Essential Solo Beatles Songs. He recognises Harrison's bitterness towards his detractors as a common trait among the former Beatles, and "desperation" in his revisiting a revered Beatles song to air his grievances. Jackson nevertheless admires "the group's synergy" on the recording, as well as Forster's string arrangement, saying: "['This Guitar'] could have been one of the most depressing ex-Beatles tunes ever, but its strange groove compels repeated listening." Robert Rodriguez considers it to be a "fine track" containing one of Harrison's "finest vocal performances", yet he also identifies an unwelcome "air of defensiveness, bordering on arrogance" in the lyrics.

Writing in Mojo magazine, John Harris describes "This Guitar" as a "serviceable sequel" in which Harrison "1) does a neat Dylan impression, and 2) plays yet another lovely slide solo". Oregano Rathbone of Record Collector cites it as an example of how each of Harrison's Apple albums after the critically acclaimed All Things Must Pass "contains shivery moments of release". By contrast, Nick DeRiso of Ultimate Classic Rock rates it as the worst song on Extra Texture, calling it "a superfluous reworking of a Beatles tune [that] served as a signpost for this album's creatively bankrupt, dead-end vibe".

Among Harrison biographers, Simon Leng describes "This Guitar" as a "harrowing song", with a "passionate and powerful" Harrison vocal, and draws parallels between it and Neil Young's similarly anti-journalistic "Ambulance Blues". Elliot Huntley says that, while Harrison's decision to write a follow-up to "While My Guitar Gently Weeps" was misguided, the sequel is "a good song in its own right, with excellent lead guitar work from the master". Ian Inglis writes of the "gulf" separating Harrison's 1968 composition from the 1975 song: "While the first was a poignant and satisfying commentary that drew attention to his newfound maturity as a songwriter, this is a petulant and rather arrogant statement in which he appears to want to put himself above criticism ... Both words and music depict a sour and troubled performer, whose resentment is all too clear." Dale Allison describes "This Guitar" as a "beautiful song" with "ardent lyrics", and groups it with Harrison compositions such as "Isn't It a Pity", "The Light That Has Lighted the World", "Blow Away" and "Sat Singing" – all songs that "remain close to the hearts of those familiar with them".

== Other versions ==
Harrison's experiences as a headline performer in 1974 led to him not touring again for seventeen years, when he undertook a short tour of Japan with Eric Clapton's band in December 1991. In November that year, during rehearsals at Bray Studios in Berkshire, "This Guitar (Can't Keep from Crying)" was one of 35 songs that Harrison considered for the concert setlist, but he did not perform it at any of the shows.

Former Eurythmic Dave Stewart recalls recording a version of "This Guitar" with Harrison in London. The recording was made in 1992 and, over ten years later, Ringo Starr, Dhani Harrison and Kara DioGuardi overdubbed contributions on drums, acoustic guitar and backing vocals, respectively. The song was then published over the internet to promote Stewart's Platinum Weird project, in March 2006 – over four years after Harrison's death from cancer at the age of 58. Although it did not appear on Platinum Weird's album, Make Believe, this version of "This Guitar" was included as a bonus track on the 2014 reissue of Extra Texture. Writing for Blogcritics, Seattle-based critic Chaz Lipp views it as a "tighter rock-oriented remake".

== Personnel ==
The following musicians played on the original version of "This Guitar (Can't Keep from Crying)":

- George Harrison – vocals, 12-string acoustic guitar, ARP bass, slide guitars
- Jesse Ed Davis – electric guitar
- David Foster – piano, string arrangement
- Gary Wright – ARP strings
- Jim Keltner – drums

Partial credits for 1992 re-recording (and later overdubs) as released in 2014:

- George Harrison - vocals
- Dave Stewart
- Dhani Harrison - overdubbed acoustic guitar
- Ringo Starr - overdubbed drums
- Kara DioGuardi - overdubbed backing vocals

== Sources ==
- Dale C. Allison Jr, The Love There That's Sleeping: The Art and Spirituality of George Harrison, Continuum (New York, NY, 2006; ISBN 978-0-8264-1917-0).
- Keith Badman, The Beatles Diary Volume 2: After the Break-Up 1970–2001, Omnibus Press (London, 2001; ISBN 0-7119-8307-0).
- Roy Carr & Tony Tyler, The Beatles: An Illustrated Record, Trewin Copplestone Publishing (London, 1978; ISBN 0-450-04170-0).
- Harry Castleman & Walter J. Podrazik, All Together Now: The First Complete Beatles Discography 1961–1975, Ballantine Books (New York, NY, 1976; ISBN 0-345-25680-8).
- Alan Clayson, George Harrison, Sanctuary (London, 2003; ISBN 1-86074-489-3).
- The Editors of Rolling Stone, Harrison, Rolling Stone Press/Simon & Schuster (New York, NY, 2002; ISBN 0-7432-3581-9).
- Joshua M. Greene, Here Comes the Sun: The Spiritual and Musical Journey of George Harrison, John Wiley & Sons (Hoboken, NJ, 2006; ISBN 978-0-470-12780-3).
- Joe Hagan, Sticky Fingers: The Life and Times of Jann Wenner and Rolling Stone Magazine, Knopf (New York, NY, 2017; ISBN 978-0-345-81505-7).
- George Harrison, I Me Mine, Chronicle Books (San Francisco, CA, 2002 [1980]; ISBN 0-8118-3793-9).
- Olivia Harrison, George Harrison: Living in the Material World, Abrams (New York, NY, 2011; ISBN 978-1-4197-0220-4).
- Elliot J. Huntley, Mystical One: George Harrison – After the Break-up of the Beatles, Guernica Editions (Toronto, ON, 2006; ISBN 1-55071-197-0).
- Ian Inglis, The Words and Music of George Harrison, Praeger (Santa Barbara, CA, 2010; ISBN 978-0-313-37532-3).
- Andrew Grant Jackson, Still the Greatest: The Essential Solo Beatles Songs, Scarecrow Press (Lanham, MD, 2012; ISBN 978-0-8108-8222-5).
- Ashley Kahn (ed.), George Harrison on George Harrison: Interviews and Encounters, Chicago Review Press (Chicago, IL, 2020; ISBN 978-1-64160-051-4).
- Peter Lavezzoli, The Dawn of Indian Music in the West, Continuum (New York, NY, 2006; ISBN 0-8264-2819-3).
- Simon Leng, While My Guitar Gently Weeps: The Music of George Harrison, Hal Leonard (Milwaukee, WI, 2006; ISBN 1-4234-0609-5).
- Chip Madinger & Mark Easter, Eight Arms to Hold You: The Solo Beatles Compendium, 44.1 Productions (Chesterfield, MO, 2000; ISBN 0-615-11724-4).
- Robert Rodriguez, Fab Four FAQ 2.0: The Beatles' Solo Years, 1970–1980, Backbeat Books (Milwaukee, WI, 2010; ISBN 978-1-4165-9093-4).
- Nicholas Schaffner, The Beatles Forever, McGraw-Hill (New York, NY, 1978; ISBN 0-07-055087-5).
- Bruce Spizer, The Beatles Solo on Apple Records, 498 Productions (New Orleans, LA, 2005; ISBN 0-9662649-5-9).
- Gary Tillery, Working Class Mystic: A Spiritual Biography of George Harrison, Quest Books (Wheaton, IL, 2011; ISBN 978-0-8356-0900-5).
- Timothy White, "George Harrison: Reconsidered", Musician, November 1987, pp. 50–67.
- Bob Woffinden, The Beatles Apart, Proteus (London, 1981; ISBN 0-906071-89-5).
