= I Don't Care Anymore (George Harrison song) =

- US B-side label

Single by George Harrison
- A-side: "Dark Horse" (US); "Ding Dong, Ding Dong" (UK)
- Released: 18 November 1974 (US); 6 December 1974 (UK)
- Recorded: October 1974
- Studio: A&M, Hollywood
- Genre: Country
- Length: 2:40
- Label: Apple
- Songwriter: George Harrison
- Producer: George Harrison

George Harrison singles chronology
"Give Me Love (Give Me Peace on Earth)" (1973)	"Dark Horse" / "I Don't Care Anymore" (1974)	"Ding Dong, Ding Dong" (1974)

"I Don't Care Anymore" is a song by English musician George Harrison, released as the B-side of the lead single from his 1974 album Dark Horse. The A-side was "Dark Horse" in the majority of countries internationally and "Ding Dong, Ding Dong" elsewhere, including the United Kingdom. It is one of Harrison's relatively rare compositions in the country music genre and, equally unusual among his 1970s releases, the recording is a solo performance.

Harrison wrote "I Don't Care Anymore" during a period of personal upheaval and extramarital affairs, coinciding with the end of his marriage to Pattie Boyd. The song is a love song, in which he express his desire for a woman who appears to be married. Harrison recorded the track in Los Angeles in October 1974, in a single take. His hoarse vocals reflect the onset of laryngitis as he rushed to complete Dark Horse while rehearsing for his North American tour with Ravi Shankar. Several commentators hold the song in low regard, finding the literal message in the title mirrored in Harrison's casual performance.

Along with "Deep Blue" and "Miss O'Dell", "I Don't Care Anymore" was one of three non-album B-sides issued by the artist during the 1970s. Having been unavailable officially for 40 years after its initial release, the song was included as a bonus track on the 2014 Apple Years 1968–75 reissue of Dark Horse.

== Background and composition ==
"I Don't Care Anymore" is one of the few George Harrison compositions released before 1980 that he does not discuss in his autobiography, I, Me, Mine. Authors Ian Inglis and Dale Allison identify it as a song expressing lust for a married woman, written during a period when Harrison was romantically linked to, variously, Krissy Wood (wife of guitarist Ron Wood), Maureen Starkey (ex-bandmate Ringo Starr's wife) and English model Kathy Simmons. When discussing another song from 1974, "Simply Shady", Harrison later referred to this time as "a bit of a bender", while his marriage to Pattie Boyd finally fell apart.

According to Inglis, "I Don't Care Anymore" is an example of the "[musical] synthesis of jug band, skiffle, and country traditions" that Harrison had grasped via influences such as Bob Dylan, the Band, Lonnie Donegan, David Bromberg and the Lovin' Spoonful. Author Bruce Spizer views the song as Dylan-influenced in its musical arrangement, like Harrison's 1973 B-side "Miss O'Dell", but describes the chord sequence as "pure Harrison".

On the released recording, "I Don't Care Anymore" begins with Harrison speaking in a deep growl. These opening words – "Two old cowpoke went riding out one cold December day" – are a reference to Stan Jones's 1948 song "Riders in the Sky". The casual nature of the performance is further reflected in Harrison's spoken introduction before the first verse: "OK, here we go, fellas / We got a B-side to make, ladies and gentlemen …"

In the verses, he states a willingness to "kick down anybody's door" in order to pursue his affair. Inglis notes a rare "wistfulness" in the lines "There's a line that I can draw / That often leaves me wanting more", which appear in the middle-eight. Harrison's musical biographer, Simon Leng, considers that the song recalls the "teenage preoccupations" of Harrison's Beatles-era compositions "Don't Bother Me" and "I Need You", but he adds: "The difference is that this time there's a menacing undercurrent of aggression and just a hint of one drink too many."

== Recording ==
I had to come up with a B-side and I did it in one take. The story was in the attitude: I-don't-give-a-shit!

— Harrison to Musician magazine, November 1987

In October 1974, shortly before leaving for Los Angeles to begin rehearsals for his North American tour with Ravi Shankar, Harrison recorded an interview with BBC Radio 1 DJ Alan Freeman in which he performed three new songs, along with a snippet of his All Things Must Pass track "Awaiting on You All". The final song Harrison played was "I Don't Care Anymore", sung in a cleaner-sounding voice than the officially released version, and with lyrics amended to thank Freeman for his support over the years. This interview was broadcast on 6 December 1974 in Britain but delayed until September 1975 in America, where it was used to promote Harrison's 1975 album, Extra Texture. (Note: Harrison's live performance of "I Don't Care Anymore" subsequently appeared on the bootleg compilation A True Legend, released by Strawberry Records in 1999.)

Speaking to Musician magazine in 1987, Harrison recalled that he recorded the song hurriedly for release as the B-side of his 1974 single, "Dark Horse", which was also the name of his new record label. Having overextended himself throughout the year on projects by his Dark Horse signings Shankar and the English group Splinter, Harrison was forced to finish his own album, Dark Horse, in Los Angeles while rehearsing for the North American tour. The resulting strain on his voice, together with his overindulgence with drugs and alcohol, led to him contracting laryngitis. (Note: Discussing the period in a 1979 interview, Harrison recalled: "I could put back a bottle of brandy occasionally, plus all the other naughty things that fly around. I just went on a binge … until it got to the point where I had no voice and almost no body at times.") Following Harrison's reference to needing a B-side during the song's intro, Inglis finds a "sense of haste permeat[ing]" the recording of "I Don't Care Anymore", as if the singer was "hurry[ing] to meet a deadline".

Leng describes Harrison's performance on guitar as "Dylanish upmarket busking" in the style of "Miss O'Dell". In addition to playing 12-string acoustic guitar and singing, Harrison overdubbed a part on jew's harp, an instrument that was among his many contributions to Splinter's debut album, The Place I Love. Authors Chip Madinger and Mark Easter view the song as an obvious "one-take affair", with Harrison's half-heartedness apparent in his "barely in-tune" guitar and the underlying message that "[recording] this B-side is a pain in the ass". (Note: While also noting the "throwaway" nature of the recording, Spizer remarks that Harrison sounds drunk at the start of the track.)

== Release and reception ==
Apple Records released the "Dark Horse" single on 18 November 1974 in the United States. (Note: Like all his former Beatles bandmates, Harrison remained contracted to Apple and EMI as a recording artist until 26 January 1976.) In Britain, "I Don't Care Anymore" was similarly the B-side to the album's lead single, issued on 6 December, but with "Ding Dong, Ding Dong" as the A-side. Both of the lead sides also featured vocals by Harrison that were affected by his worsening throat problems in the build-up to the tour.

As a Harrison solo performance, "I Don't Care Anymore" shared common ground with the Dylan-styled "Apple Scruffs", a track from All Things Must Pass that was then issued as a 1971 B-side. Asked at his pre-tour press conference on 23 October 1974 whether he planned to perform any songs solo in the upcoming concerts, Harrison replied: "I hope not. I'd like to do some acoustic tunes, but I still like a little back-beat." Harrison's vocal affliction was evident in his singing throughout the subsequent tour, which the press began calling "the Dark Hoarse Tour".

Describing the largely unfavourable critical reception towards the Dark Horse album, author Elliot Huntley writes that the title of "I Don't Care Anymore" appeared to be "a literal reflection of [Harrison's] attitude, circa 1974". Bruce Spizer recalls of the song's release: "While the whole affair may have been intended as a joke, listeners were left with the impression that George really didn't care anymore." In his 2001 feature on Harrison's Apple recordings, for Record Collector, Peter Doggett similarly remarked that, with many viewing "Ding Dong" as "a joke", the title of its B-side "seemed to say it all".

In Simon Leng's opinion, "Whether intentionally or not, on 'I Don't Care Anymore', Harrison sounds in danger of coming off the dark racecourse completely", and he comments that, while the "growled gibberish" at the start of the track was designed to be comical, "the real gag was that it mirrored exactly what his voice would sound like on the Dark Horse Tour." Like Leng, AllMusic editor Stephen Thomas Erlewine dismisses the song as a "throwaway". Writing in Goldmine magazine in 2002, Dave Thompson considered "I Don't Care Anymore" to be "pleasant enough" among the songs from Harrison's Dark Horse period, few of which "could be compared to past triumphs". More impressed, Doug Gallant of the Canadian newspaper The Guardian describes the track as a "little gem".

In his book The Love There That's Sleeping, Dale Allison, a Christian Theologian, dismisses "I Don't Care Anymore" as "the nadir of George's musical corpus". He adds: "The lyrics, which wantonly defend an adulterous relationship, must be condemned, to borrow from 'Devil's Radio', as 'words that thoughtless speak.' This is not what we need to hear from anybody."

== Reissue ==
"I Don't Care Anymore" was not included on any Harrison album and was therefore long unavailable after its original release. In 1999, the song became available unofficially, however, on the bootleg compilation Through Many Years, which also contained "Deep Blue" and "Miss O'Dell", Harrison's other two non-album B-sides from the 1970s.

Following the appearance of "Deep Blue" and "Miss O'Dell" as bonus tracks on the 2006 Living in the Material World remaster, "I Don't Care Anymore" remained the only one of Harrison's formally released recordings not to have been officially issued on compact disc. In September 2014, the song was included as a bonus track on the Apple Years 1968–75 reissue of Dark Horse, along with a sparse acoustic demo of "Dark Horse".

== Personnel ==
- George Harrison – vocals, 12-string acoustic guitar, jew's harp

== Sources ==
- Dale C. Allison Jr, The Love There That's Sleeping: The Art and Spirituality of George Harrison, Continuum (New York, NY, 2006; ISBN 978-0-8264-1917-0).
- Keith Badman, The Beatles Diary Volume 2: After the Break-Up 1970−2001, Omnibus Press (London, 2001; ISBN 0-7119-8307-0).
- Harry Castleman & Walter J. Podrazik, All Together Now: The First Complete Beatles Discography 1961−1975, Ballantine Books (New York, NY, 1976; ISBN 0-345-25680-8).
- Alan Clayson, George Harrison, Sanctuary (London, 2003; ISBN 1-86074-489-3).
- Peter Doggett, You Never Give Me Your Money: The Beatles After the Breakup, It Books (New York, NY, 2011; ISBN 978-0-06-177418-8).
- George Harrison, I Me Mine – The Extended Edition, Genesis Publications (Guildford, UK, 2017; ISBN 978-1-905662-40-1).
- Olivia Harrison, George Harrison: Living in the Material World, Abrams (New York, NY, 2011; ISBN 978-1-4197-0220-4).
- Bill Harry, The George Harrison Encyclopedia, Virgin Books (London, 2003; ISBN 978-0-753508220).
- Elliot J. Huntley, Mystical One: George Harrison – After the Break-up of the Beatles, Guernica Editions (Toronto, ON, 2006; ISBN 1-55071-197-0).
- Ian Inglis, The Words and Music of George Harrison, Praeger (Santa Barbara, CA, 2010; ISBN 978-0-313-37532-3).
- Simon Leng, While My Guitar Gently Weeps: The Music of George Harrison, Hal Leonard (Milwaukee, WI, 2006; ISBN 1-4234-0609-5).
- Chip Madinger & Mark Easter, Eight Arms to Hold You: The Solo Beatles Compendium, 44.1 Productions (Chesterfield, MO, 2000; ISBN 0-615-11724-4).
- Chris O'Dell (with Katherine Ketcham), Miss O'Dell: My Hard Days and Long Nights with The Beatles, The Stones, Bob Dylan, Eric Clapton, and the Women They Loved, Touchstone (New York, NY, 2009; ISBN 978-1-4165-9093-4).
- Robert Rodriguez, Fab Four FAQ 2.0: The Beatles' Solo Years, 1970–1980, Backbeat Books (Milwaukee, WI, 2010; ISBN 978-1-4165-9093-4).
- Nicholas Schaffner, The Beatles Forever, McGraw-Hill (New York, NY, 1978; ISBN 0-07-055087-5).
- Bruce Spizer, The Beatles Solo on Apple Records, 498 Productions (New Orleans, LA, 2005; ISBN 0-9662649-5-9).
- Ronnie Wood, Ronnie, Macmillan (Sydney, NSW, 2007; ISBN 978-1-4050-3817-1).
