= The Apple Years 1968–75 =

Box set by George Harrison
- Released: 22 September 2014
- Recorded: 1967–75; 1992
- Genres: Rock, pop, Indian classical, experimental
- Label: Apple
- Producers: George Harrison; Phil Spector
- Compiler: Dhani Harrison

George Harrison chronology
Early Takes: Volume 1 (2012)	The Apple Years 1968–75 (2014)	George Harrison – The Vinyl Collection (2017)

The Apple Years 1968–75 is a box set by the English musician George Harrison, released on 22 September 2014. The eight-disc set compiles all of Harrison's studio albums that were originally issued on the Beatles' Apple record label. The six albums are Wonderwall Music (1968), Electronic Sound (1969), All Things Must Pass (1970; spread over two CDs), Living in the Material World (1973), Dark Horse (1974) and Extra Texture (1975). The final disc is a DVD containing a feature titled "The Apple Years", promotional films from some of his previous posthumous reissues, such as The Concert for Bangladesh, and other video clips. The box set marks the first time that the Dark Horse and Extra Texture albums have been remastered since their 1991 CD release.

Among the bonus tracks spread across the set is an alternative, instrumental version of Harrison's 1968 B-side for the Beatles, "The Inner Light"; a remixed version of his non-album single "Bangla Desh"; and a 1992 re-recording of "This Guitar (Can't Keep from Crying)" (featuring overdubbed contributions from Ringo Starr and Dhani Harrison) that was used to promote Dave Stewart's Platinum Weird project in 2006. Also included in the package is a book containing essays by author Kevin Howlett and rare photos.

== Release ==
Following an initial statement by Dhani Harrison on social media, the upcoming release of The Apple Years 1968–75 was officially announced on 2 September 2014. Each of the six reissued albums was also made available separate from the box set. Both The Apple Years 1968–75 and the individual reissues were released by Apple and Universal on 22 September in the United Kingdom and 23 September in the United States. The albums were also made available in high-definition digital audio configuration on 24 November. Overseen by Dhani, the high-definition versions were mastered in 96 kHz/24-bit digital resolution from the original master tapes, for the first time.

The box set was designed as a companion piece to The Dark Horse Years 1976–1992, the 2004-issued set covering Harrison's career on his Dark Horse record label. Speaking of why his father's later-period work had been repackaged first, rather than the complete Apple output, Dhani Harrison referred to "politics and legal things", while likening the non-chronological approach to that of the Star Wars film series.

== Promotion ==
In the US, the release was promoted via a "George Harrison Week" initiative on the TBS television show Conan, beginning on Monday, 22 September. Over separate nights that week, Beck performed the All Things Must Pass track "Wah-Wah", Paul Simon played Harrison's Beatles song "Here Comes the Sun", Dhani Harrison and the band Big Black Delta performed "Let It Down" and "Ballad of Sir Frankie Crisp (Let It Roll)", both from All Things Must Pass, and Norah Jones played "Behind That Locked Door" from the same album. Harrison's Wonderwall Music soundtrack album, as well as the 1968 film, were celebrated in an event held at the Grammy Museum in Los Angeles, partly hosted by music journalist and television writer David Wild.

Olivia and Dhani Harrison held an online competition in which filmmakers were invited to create a video clip for George Harrison's 1971 hit song "What Is Life". The winner received a $5000 cash prize and their entry became the official video for the track, appearing on the Harrison YouTube channel and other media platforms.

An all-star concert, George Fest, was held at the Fonda Theatre in Los Angeles on 28 September. A benefit for the Sweet Relief Musicians Fund, the concert's performers included Brian Wilson, Dhani Harrison, Norah Jones, Wayne Coyne and Steven Drozd of the Flaming Lips, Ben Harper, Spoon's Britt Daniel, "Weird Al" Yankovic, Ann Wilson of Heart, and Ian Astbury.

== Reception ==
Professional ratings
Aggregate scores
Source	Rating
Metacritic	71/100
Review scores
Source	Rating
AllMusic	4.5/5 stars
American Songwriter	4/5 stars
Classic Rock	8/10
The Guardian (Canada)	4/5 stars
Mojo	3/5 stars
Paste	7.8/10
PopMatters	9/10 stars
Q	4/5 stars
Record Collector	4/5 stars
Uncut	6/10

Among initial reviews, Hal Horowitz of American Songwriter magazine praises the box set's packaging as well as the sound of the remastered albums, and describes All Things Must Pass as "the undisputed high point of Harrison's solo catalog" and a "five star album [that] overflows with exquisite songs, complex, gorgeously rendered performances and melodies". Horowitz concludes of the set as a whole: "Regardless of the eclectic nature of these albums and their often subpar material, George Harrison deserves the elaborate treatment he gets here, which makes this a worthwhile addition to any Beatle lovers' bulging collection …" In a less favourable review for Uncut, Richard Williams writes that "only a devoted Apple scruff could love Extra Texture, or its two immediate predecessors", although he admires Wonderwall Music as an album that "documents an innocent optimism that will always be worth a listen".

AllMusic editor Stephen Thomas Erlewine describes The Apple Years as "a handsomely produced, impeccably remastered box set" with the sound "rich, deep, and alluring". He writes of All Things Must Pass being "rightly regarded as the masterpiece" while highlighting Wonderwall Music as "a bit of an unacknowledged gem, a frequently intriguing psychedelic relic that represents one of the first serious forays into world music by a Western musician". Erlewine concludes of the six albums: "It's hard to deny the ups and downs to be found here, but combined they paint a picture of Harrison's complexities and contradictions, and the music has never sounded better – and each album has never looked better – than it does here."

While viewing All Things Must Pass as "the only essential record", Michael Gallucci of Ultimate Classic Rock writes: "like all of his former bandmates' solo careers, Harrison's was spotty … [and] the seven years were marked by creative indulgences that didn't always pay off … When they did, the results were right up there with the best of the Beatles' solo material." In a review for the Lexington Herald-Leader, Walter Tunis describes All Things Must Pass as "the finest solo album ever issued by a Beatle" and an album that "belongs in everyone's record collection". Tunis considers Extra Texture to be "a delight", and writes of Living in the Material World: "Its appeal is strong, but the spiritual connections seem more obtuse and weighty at times … But there are stunners here, too …"

Writing for Paste magazine, Robert Ham views Material World as "the album that benefits most from these remastering efforts" and "[the] one ripe for rediscovery". Ham suggests that for die-hard Beatles fans, The Apple Years "is essential listening to aid you in getting a little closer to appreciating Harrison's growth as an artist and as a human being". In his review for The Second Disc, Joe Marchese compliments the packaging and deems the box set "beautiful inside and out", adding: "The Apple Years presents George Harrison in his many contradictions, but one thing that's crystal-clear is that the music he left behind is music to cherish."

== Box-set contents ==
Disc no.	Original release	Bonus tracks
1	Wonderwall Music	"In the First Place" (by the Remo Four); "Almost Shankara"; "The Inner Light" (alt. take, instrumental)
2	Electronic Sound	
3 & 4	All Things Must Pass	"I Live for You"; "Beware of Darkness" (acoustic demo); "Let It Down" (alt. version); "What Is Life" (backing track/alt. mix); "My Sweet Lord (2000)"
5	Living in the Material World	"Deep Blue"; "Miss O'Dell"; "Bangla Desh"
6	Dark Horse	"I Don't Care Anymore"; "Dark Horse (Early Take)"
7	Extra Texture (Read All About It)	"This Guitar (Can't Keep from Crying) (Platinum Weird version)"
8	The Apple Years DVD: "The Apple Years"; "All Things Must Pass EPK"; "Give Me Love (Give Me Peace on Earth)" (live in Japan); "Miss O'Dell"; "Sue Me, Sue You Blues"; "Making of Living in the Material World featurette"; "Ding Dong, Ding Dong"; "Dark Horse album TV promo"; "The Concert for Bangladesh EPK"	

== Charts ==
Chart (2014)	Position
Belgian Ultratop 200 Albums (Flanders)	106
Dutch MegaCharts Top 100 Albums	81
German GfK Entertainment Top 100 Albums	45
Italian FIMI Albums Chart	66
US Billboard 200	167
US Billboard Top Rock Albums	47
