= The Beatles: An Illustrated Record =

1975 book by Carr and Tyler

- First edition
- Author: Roy Carr, Tony Tyler
- Language: English
- Genre: Music
- Publisher: Harmony Books
- Publication date: 1975
- ISBN: 0-517-52045-1

The Beatles: An Illustrated Record is a 1975 book by music journalists Roy Carr and Tony Tyler, published by Harmony Books (ISBN 0-517-52045-1). Updated editions were published in 1978 and 1981.

Formatted in the same shape as an LP record, the lavishly put-together book contains an extensive discography of record releases by the Beatles, with critical reviews of each release by Tyler and Carr. Sidebars give a concurrent history of the band, with press clippings, quotes, and photos from each phase of the Beatles's career, including their post-breakup solo years.

The book mainly follows the British releases of the Beatles' records, and helped inform an American audience theretofore unfamiliar with that sequencing. It continues, following the group's split in 1970, by reviewing each solo album and single. The authors are notably direct and unforgiving in their assessment of the former Beatles' solo releases. In particular, Carr and Tyler are generally disparaging about George Harrison's early solo work, even his All Things Must Pass triple album, which is generally regarded as being among the best solo releases.

The final section of the book includes a United States discography, and notable foreign releases. The first edition also included a list of bootleg Beatles recordings.

An Illustrated Record was a commercial success, reaching number two on The New York Times Best Seller list for trade paperbacks. Its reported sales of 250,000 copies made it the best-selling Beatles book.

Later editions deleted the bootlegs section, stating only that they were of generally poor sound quality, and of interest "only to the most die-hard Beatlemaniacs". The 1981 edition included a tribute section to John Lennon, who had died only months earlier. Also included was a copy of Lennon's own correction to a passage in the first edition, with a copy of an early news clipping to back it up. "Set the 'Illustrated Record' straight!" Lennon wrote.
