= Tony Tyler =

British writer (1943–2006)

James Edward Anthony Tyler (31 October 1943 in Bristol – 28 October 2006 in Hastings, East Sussex) was a British writer who authored several books and wrote for the magazines NME, Macworld, MacUser, PC Pro and Computer Shopper.

He joined the NME in 1972, recruited by editor Alan Smith.

He was an early expert on the Middle-earth fiction of J. R. R. Tolkien, publishing The Tolkien Companion in 1976. It was a concordance describing all the characters, objects, and places named in The Hobbit and The Lord of the Rings (The Silmarillion was published the following year). A revised edition was still in print in 2022 as The Complete Tolkien Companion.
