= Apple Scruffs (song) =

- US picture sleeve

Single by George Harrison

from the album All Things Must Pass
- A-side: "What Is Life"
- Released: 15 February 1971 (US)
- Genre: Folk pop
- Length: 3:04
- Label: Apple
- Songwriter: George Harrison
- Producers: George Harrison, Phil Spector

George Harrison singles chronology
"My Sweet Lord" / "Isn't It a Pity" (1970)	"What Is Life" / "Apple Scruffs" (1971)	"Bangla Desh" (1971)

"Apple Scruffs" is a song by the English rock musician George Harrison from his 1970 triple album All Things Must Pass. He wrote it as a tribute to the die-hard Beatles fans known as Apple scruffs, who used to wait outside the Apple Corps building and other London locations for a glimpse of the band members. This tradition continued after the group's break-up in April 1970, as the scruffs were a regular presence outside the studios where Harrison recorded his album. The song was also issued on the album's second single, as the B-side to "What Is Life".

Harrison recorded "Apple Scruffs" in the style of Bob Dylan, playing acoustic guitar and harmonica on the basic track. As such, the song is a departure from the big sound synonymous with All Things Must Pass. In his lyrics, Harrison expresses gratitude for the scruffs' support, states his love for them, and acknowledges that outsiders misunderstand their devotion. Harrison invited the scruffs into EMI Studios to hear the finished recording.

A popular track on radio and with several music critics, it was listed with the A-side on some singles charts in Australia and the United States. Some writers have commented on the song's significance in light of John Lennon's murder in 1980 and the attempted murder of Harrison in 1999, both at the hands of individuals obsessed with the Beatles, and in the context of the latter-day cult of celebrity.

== Background and composition ==
The "Apple scruffs" were a group of devoted fans who waited outside the Beatles' Apple Corps headquarters and the recording studios where they worked in the late 1960s. Although well known for his aversion to fan worship, particularly the Beatlemania phenomenon, Harrison formed a bond with some of the scruffs, asking after their families and commenting when they had had their hair done. He acknowledged in an April 1969 interview with Disc and Music Echo magazine: "their part in the play is equally as important as ours." His song "Apple Scruffs" was written as a tribute to these fans, who, since late May 1970, had kept a vigil outside the various studios where he was recording his first post-Beatles solo album, All Things Must Pass.

Although Harrison makes no mention of the song in his 1980 autobiography, I, Me, Mine, Derek Taylor, in his role as the book's editor, describes the Apple Scruffs as the "central core" of fans after Beatlemania had subsided, adding that "We were all very fond of them". According to Taylor, who was the Beatles' press officer at Apple, Harrison wrote "Apple Scruffs" because the scruffs had witnessed occasions when he was "going through some bad times" and he came to hold them in great affection. (Note: According to author Andrew Grant Jackson, Harrison began writing the song for a proposed musical by him and Taylor about life at Apple. He then completed it for his 1970 solo album.)

Since forming the alliance in 1968, the Scruffs had imposed a membership hierarchy and published a monthly magazine. They were highly protective of the Beatles and shielded them from displays of intrusive fan worship. In his lyrics to the song, Harrison acknowledges the Scruffs' dedication and expresses thanks for their perseverance through bad weather and "through the pleasures and the pain". He encourages the Scruffs to ignore the judgments of passers-by who cannot comprehend their devotion. In the choruses, he declares, "How I love you, how I love you".

== Recording ==
"Apple Scruffs" was one of the more sparsely arranged tracks Harrison recorded for All Things Must Pass, departing from co-producer Phil Spector's Wall of Sound aesthetic heard on much of the album. The song is a solo performance, except for the percussive, tapping sound provided by Beatles assistant Mal Evans. Harrison performed it live on acoustic guitar and harmonica, in the style of his friend Bob Dylan. Due to his heavy beard and moustache, Harrison struggled in his attempts to play the harmonica. The sessions tapes also reveal he needed to coach himself on the sucking and blowing technique required for the part.

Take 18 was selected for overdubs. The released recording was edited together from the full take, lasting around two-and-a-half minutes, with the section comprising the song's chorus and the following instrumental passage repeated, thereby extending the track length to 3:04. Earlier in the year, Spector had similarly extended Harrison's song "I Me Mine" when preparing the Beatles' Let It Be album for release. Although Spector received a co-production credit for "Apple Scruffs", Harrison produced the song alone.

Harrison overdubbed backing vocals, credited on the album to "the George O'Hara-Smith Singers", and two slide-guitar parts onto the basic track. (Note: Various takes and rough mixes of the song appear on the 1997 bootleg compilation The Making of All Things Must Pass.) In the view of musicologist Thomas MacFarlane, the slide guitar solo reflects Harrison's interest in microtonal expressivity and ends in a stuttering phrase that marks the start of the tape edit. He describes the backing vocal contributions as a "bright, shimmering chorus" that includes an urgently delivered "angelic countermelody" over the third verse.

== Scruffs' preview ==
New York Post writer Al Aronowitz was present during part of the recording for All Things Must Pass. He later wrote: "Outside the studio door, whether it rained or not, there was always a handful of Apple Scruffs, one of them a girl all the way from Texas. Sometimes George would record from 7 p.m. to 7 a.m. and there they would be, waiting through the night, beggars for a sign of recognition on his way in and out." Harrison asked Evans to invite the Scruffs into EMI Studios (now Abbey Road Studios) to hear the track.

A teenager at the time, Gill Pritchard later recalled that she and the other Scruffs were deeply moved by the song and "went home in a daze". When they presented Harrison with a giant wreath of flowers to express their gratitude, he told them: "Well, you had your own magazine, your own office on the steps [outside Apple], so why not your own song?" (Note: Wendy Sutcliffe, another Apple scruff, said of Harrison's tribute: "It was like he had seen it all, understood how we felt and, most of all, knew that we weren't just sad, stupid girlies.")

== Release ==
Apple Records released All Things Must Pass on 27 November 1970. "Apple Scruffs" was sequenced as the second track on side three of the triple LP, between "Beware of Darkness" and "Ballad of Sir Frankie Crisp (Let It Roll)". In the wake of the Beatles' break-up seven months before, according to author Peter Doggett, "Apple Scruffs" and tracks such as "Run of the Mill" and "Wah-Wah" offered the band's fans "a teasing glimpse into an intimate world that had previously been off-limits to the public".

The song was also the B-side to "What Is Life", released internationally (though not in Britain) as the second single off the album. The single was released in the US on 15 February 1971. Author Simon Leng refers to "Apple Scruffs" as Harrison in "busking mode", a style the artist revisited on two other acoustic B-sides over the first half of the 1970s: "Miss O'Dell", written for former Apple employee Chris O'Dell, and "I Don't Care Anymore". (Note: Author Ian Inglis says the three B-sides share a "jugband informality".) The US picture sleeve gave both sides of the single equal billing, with the song titles printed above a Barry Feinstein photo of the top of a tower at Harrison's new home, Friar Park.

A popular track on radio, "Apple Scruffs" received as much airplay as the A-side in America. In Australia, "Apple Scruffs" and "What Is Life" were listed as a double A-side when the single topped the Go-Set National Top 60 in May 1971. The two sides were also listed together on the US chart compiled by Record World, where the single peaked at number 10.

== Critical reception ==
According to Beatles biographer Nicholas Schaffner, "Apple Scruffs" was one of the songs that suggested Dylan's "presence ... in spirit if not in person" on All Things Must Pass, further to speculation encouraged by Dylan and Harrison recording together in New York earlier in 1970. Alan Smith of the NME described the track as "a Dylanesque, pacy piece with harmonica and a girlie chorus". Rolling Stone's Ben Gerson deemed it "One of the most wonderful cuts on the album" and added: "it sounds as if it was recorded while co-producer Phil Spector was out for coffee." Record World called it "Dylanesque."

In his combined review of all the former Beatles' 1970 solo releases, Geoffrey Cannon of The Guardian described All Things Must Pass as "relaxed, well resolved, and, as ever with George, magnanimous" and said he especially admired the sentiments in "Apple Scruffs", despite it being "one of the slighter songs". Billboard magazine's reviewer wrote of "What Is Life" and "Apple Scruffs" as "intriguing rhythm follows-ups" to Harrison's international hit "My Sweet Lord", and songs that were "sure to repeat that success" and become popular jukebox selections. Don Heckman of The New York Times paired the song with "I Dig Love" as the tracks that conveyed a "familiarly whimsical" quality on an album where "The spirit of the Beatles is everpresent".

Writing in 1977, Schaffner said that "Apple Scruffs" and the other songs that evoked Dylan's presence were overshadowed by those with the Spector sound, yet they were "far more intimate, both musically and lyrically". (Note: More recently, Beatles historian Bruce Spizer has written of the song: "Sandwiched in the middle of an album full of elaborate wall-of-sound productions, 'Apple Scruffs' breaks through like a breath of fresh air.") Simon Leng praises the track's slide guitar parts, and particularly the backing vocals, which he describes as "the best on the album". Tom Moon, in his book 1,000 Recordings to Hear Before You Die, refers to the song as having "an explosive peak-experience refrain that comes direct from heaven's songbook".

Reviewing the 30th anniversary reissue of All Things Must Pass in 2001, James Hunter of Rolling Stone highlighted "Apple Scruffs" among the tracks on an album that "helped define the decade it ushered in", and advised listeners to "proceed to music that exults in breezy rhythms", which included "the colorful revolutions of 'What Is Life' … bluesy and intricate on Harrison and Dylan's 'I'd Have You Anytime', fizzy on 'Apple Scruffs'". Writing for Record Collector that same year, Peter Doggett also included it among the album's highlights, describing the song as Dylan-esque and a "message of love to the Beatles fans who camped outside their office". In an article covering the launch of the expanded edition of I, Me, Mine in 2017, Billboard's Andy Gensler said that "Apple Scruffs" "could have been a White Album classic".

== Legacy ==
According to Harrison biographer Alan Clayson, "Apple Scruffs" represented "the most intrinsically valuable if belated recognition of a vigil soon to end with adulthood [for the Scruffs] and the realisation that the Beatles as a 1960s myth would long outlive the mere mortals that constituted its dramatis personae". In a 1996 article on the Apple Scruffs for Mojo, Cliff Jones wrote that Harrison's musical tribute "immortalised" a fan phenomenon in which, as witnesses to the Beatles' final years, the participants transcended fandom and were themselves part of the band's history.

Leng says that the song especially resonates in pop culture history after John Lennon's murder in New York City in 1980 and Harrison's stabbing at Friar Park in 1999, both of which were carried out by individuals who were obsessed with the Beatles. He comments that the Beatles' unprecedented impact "virtually invented" the tradition of rock fans being emotionally invested in their heroes' work; given that this tradition became increasingly manipulated for commercial gain, Leng continues, "Apple Scruffs" represents "an echo from a distant, carefree age" and "shows how much has been lost".

Ian Inglis similarly views the song in the context of the violence inflicted on Harrison and Lennon, and within a cultural climate where obsession with celebrities would more likely see the scruffs issued with restraining orders than a tribute song. Describing Harrison's track as a "celebration of a unique and warm connection between the members of the Beatles and their public", Inglis adds: "Heard today, its sentiments evoke the last days of what novelist Edith Wharton had referred to, several decades earlier, as 'the age of innocence'."

Writing for Rolling Stone in 2014, author William Shaw concluded his article on the Apple scruffs by quoting Harrison's lyrics to support the contention that "Most of all, they acted as a kind of balm for the Beatles during their most punishing days as the four most famous people on the planet." Shaw also commented that despite the existence of fan groups devoted to acts such as Duran Duran, Justin Bieber, Miley Cyrus and Beyoncé, none were or would ever be as "legendary and as sweetly original" as the scruffs.

== Personnel ==
According to Simon Leng and Chip Madinger and Mark Easter:

- George Harrison – vocals, acoustic guitar, harmonica, slide guitars, backing vocals
- Mal Evans – wooden block

== Sources ==
- Keith Badman, The Beatles Diary Volume 2: After the Break-Up 1970–2001, Omnibus Press (London, 2001; ISBN 0-7119-8307-0).
- Harry Castleman & Walter J. Podrazik, All Together Now: The First Complete Beatles Discography 1961–1975, Ballantine Books (New York, NY, 1976; ISBN 0-345-25680-8).
- Alan Clayson, George Harrison, Sanctuary (London, 2003; ISBN 1-86074-489-3).
- Peter Doggett, You Never Give Me Your Money: The Beatles After the Breakup, It Books (New York, NY, 2011; ISBN 978-0-06-177418-8).
- George Harrison, I Me Mine, Chronicle Books (San Francisco, CA, 2002 [1980]; ISBN 0-8118-3793-9).
- Bill Harry, The George Harrison Encyclopedia, Virgin Books (London, 2003; ISBN 978-0-7535-0822-0).
- Ian Inglis, The Words and Music of George Harrison, Praeger (Santa Barbara, CA, 2010; ISBN 978-0-313-37532-3).
- Andrew Grant Jackson, Still the Greatest: The Essential Solo Beatles Songs, Scarecrow Press (Lanham, MD, 2012; ISBN 978-0-8108-8222-5).
- Cliff Jones, "Apple Scruffs: 'We're Waiting for the Beatles'", Mojo, October 1996, pp. 68–72.
- Simon Leng, While My Guitar Gently Weeps: The Music of George Harrison, Hal Leonard (Milwaukee, WI, 2006; ISBN 1-4234-0609-5).
- Ian MacDonald, Revolution in the Head: The Beatles' Records and the Sixties, Pimlico (London, 1998; ISBN 0-7126-6697-4).
- Thomas MacFarlane, The Music of George Harrison, Routledge (Abingdon, UK, 2019; ISBN 978-1-138-59910-9).
- Chip Madinger & Mark Easter, Eight Arms to Hold You: The Solo Beatles Compendium, 44.1 Productions (Chesterfield, MO, 2000; ISBN 0-615-11724-4).
- Tom Moon, 1,000 Recordings to Hear Before You Die, Workman Publishing (New York, NY, 2008; ISBN 978-0-7611-5385-6).
- Robert Rodriguez, Fab Four FAQ 2.0: The Beatles' Solo Years, 1970–1980, Backbeat Books (Milwaukee, WI, 2010; ISBN 978-1-4165-9093-4).
- Nicholas Schaffner, The Beatles Forever, McGraw-Hill (New York, NY, 1978; ISBN 0-07-055087-5).
- Bruce Spizer, The Beatles Solo on Apple Records, 498 Productions (New Orleans, LA, 2005; ISBN 0-9662649-5-9).
