= Apple scruffs =

Loose-knit group of Beatles fans

The Scruffs being interviewed for Rolling Stone in 1970. (L–R) Wendy Sutcliffe, Jill Pritchard, Margo Stevens, Carol Bedford, Lucy, and Cathy Sarver

The Apple scruffs were a group of devoted Beatles fans who congregated outside the Apple Corps building and at the gates of EMI Studios (later named Abbey Road Studios) in London during the late 1960s, in the hope of seeing or interacting with one of the band members. The name was coined by George Harrison. According to Apple press officer Derek Taylor, when The Sunday Times wrote a feature article on the company in the late 1960s, their map included a location for the scruffs, on the steps of the offices at 3 Savile Row.

The scruffs carried membership cards and sought to protect the Beatles from the frenzied fan worship of Beatlemania. They built a rapport with the band members and became associated with the Beatles' history in the years before and shortly after their break-up in 1970. Harrison's song "Apple Scruffs", from his 1970 triple album All Things Must Pass, is a tribute to the Apple scruffs.

== Membership ==
The Apple scruffs had a membership hierarchy, which helped ensure that newcomers refrained from screaming at the sight of one of the Beatles, and printed membership cards. Almost all of the scruffs were young women. Apple Corps press officer Derek Taylor recalled that unlike the groupies that bands such as the Beatles and the Byrds attracted in the United States, the scruffs' motives were innocent, as they sought merely to be supportive of their heroes. According to American journalist Al Aronowitz, who documented the scruffs' all-night vigils during the 1970 recording sessions for All Things Must Pass, George Harrison's first post-Beatles solo album: "In the morning they'd go off to their jobs and in the evening they'd be back outside the studio door again. Their grapevine was infallible."

Beatles biographer Bill Harry lists the members as Margo Stevens, Jill Pritchard, Nancy Allen, Carol Bedford and Wendy Sutcliffe, and other girls known as Sue-John, Chris, Di, Kath, Virginia, Dani and Lucy. In addition, there was Tommy and Jimmy, two gay boys from New York. Sue-John was so named because of her passion for John Lennon; Lucy, an Italian, was fixated on Harrison; Bedford's favourite was Paul McCartney. By 1969, when the Beatles were recording their Abbey Road album, tourists would also wait outside EMI Studios (later named Abbey Road Studios) with the scruffs.

Stevens, the scruffs' leader, was a babysitter and originally brought her charge with her. While still a scruff, Stevens started work as a caterer at Apple Corps; she later became a promotions officer for the company. Pritchard, a 17-year-old hairdresser in March 1969, left Birmingham for London midway through serving a customer after hearing radio reports about McCartney's upcoming wedding to Linda Eastman. Pritchard went on to work at EMI Studios for many years. The scruffs made Taylor an honorary Apple scruff in 1969 and issued him with a membership card.

== Operation ==
=== Interaction with the Beatles ===
After a while of being around them, seeing them every day, you ceased to really have a favourite; it was something to do with the energy of the time and their incredible energy that drew us together. It was a great feeling of belonging ... [Back] then the feeling was that it was all changing and somehow the Beatles were at the forefront of that change. They were lovely people, just like you imagined them to be. Very funny, very witty and yet so real and so important to that process of change.

— Former Apple scruff Nancy Allen, 1996

In a 1996 article on the Apple scruffs for Mojo magazine, Cliff Jones wrote that their presence at Apple and outside recording studios such as EMI and the Beatles' homes ensured them a role as insiders and witnesses to the band's history. In this way, he continued, the scruffs "transcended" fandom and became part of "the Beatles' legend" themselves. Harrison told Disc and Music Echo in April 1969 that "their part in the play is equally as important as ours." Taylor was intrigued by the scruffs' ability to discover which studio the Beatles were working in on any given day, and at how the scruffs were often more informed about the band's activities than the Apple staff were. In this regard, he said they were like "Sherlock Scruffs". (Note: Chris O'Dell, who worked in various capacities for Apple and the individual Beatles, recalled that an absence of scruffs outside 3 Savile Row signalled "there were no Beatles in the house".)

According to Taylor, the Beatles were fascinated by the scruffs because of their innocence. He said that Lennon was "sometimes difficult"; McCartney was always polite but struggled with their treatment of Linda; Harrison overcame his shyness and aversion to fan worship, and "grew very fond" of the scruffs; and Ringo Starr "was Ringo and always had time for a joke or a quip". (Note: Linda McCartney later complained to her friend Danny Fields that "everyone hated me", including "those horrible groupies always in front of the house, calling me names, spitting at me".)

Through their proximity to their heroes, the scruffs came to see how normal the band members were. Pritchard recalled that, in contrast to the other Beatles, particularly Lennon, McCartney sought their approval, as if to say: "I'm the nice one, like me, like me!" Sutcliffe said that while most of the scruffs liked McCartney for his "cute" image, this changed over time, and they "saw through Paul" just as they did Lennon's intimidating, caustic exterior. Harrison showed an interest in some of the scruffs, asking after their families and, in author Alan Clayson's description, sharing exchanges that recalled "the spirit of the Cavern". Due to its location at Cavendish Avenue in St John's Wood, close to EMI Studios, the McCartney home was another popular location for the scruffs. He trusted some of the girls enough to let them walk his dog Martha.

=== Incidents ===
In November 1968, Lennon and Yoko Ono released their avant-garde album Two Virgins on Apple Records with a cover showing the couple naked. It was distributed by Track in the UK and Tetragrammaton in the US since EMI refused to issue the record with the intended cover. Apple hired several of the scruffs to package the album in the controversial sleeves. According to Apple employee Jack Oliver, they worked "in the basement of the old Apple shop".

McCartney took to calling the scruffs "the Eyes and Ears of the World" since they were always aware of the Beatles' movements. The Abbey Road song "She Came In Through the Bathroom Window" refers to the day when some fans climbed into McCartney's house through an upstairs bathroom window and raided his wardrobe for a pair of trousers, which they took turns wearing. They also stole a framed photograph, among many other items, but later returned it at McCartney's request. The episode marked a rare example of an Apple scruff acting disloyally towards the Beatles. (Note: According to Pritchard, the break-in was carried out by scruff Little Di and some "Baddies" – the vindictive element among Beatles fans. Pritchard and Bedford confronted these fans and retrieved most of the stolen photos.)

Throughout 1969, they also witnessed scenes of friction that reflected the divisions within the band. In one incident during the sessions for Abbey Road, McCartney stormed out of the studio building in tears; when he failed to attend the following day's session, an irate Lennon went to McCartney's house and climbed over the high wall after McCartney refused to respond to his banging on the gate. The pair then had a heated argument in which Lennon berated McCartney for ignoring how Harrison and Starr had driven in from outside London especially for the recording session.

Due to Stevens' employment at Apple, some of the more trusted scruffs were invited to the company's 1969 Christmas party. They danced with Beatles aide Mal Evans and socialised with Harrison and Starr.

The Apple scruffs were a regular presence outside the London studios where Harrison recorded All Things Must Pass in 1970. According to Bedford's published account, he went home with her one night and confided that his marriage to Pattie Boyd was in trouble. On another occasion, he invited the scruffs into EMI to hear his newly recorded tribute song "Apple Scruffs". Pritchard recalled that it was at 6 am, after the sort of particularly cold night that used to make them "curse the Beatles sometimes under our breath"; Stevens, Bedford, Lucy and a girl named Cathy were the others present when Evans delivered the invitation. She said that after hearing the track, "We all just looked at each other, it was unbelievable. We were so moved we went home in a daze ..."

Some of the scruffs described American producer Phil Spector as a favourite, saying that he understood why they waited on the steps at Apple and even joined them there for breakfast one morning. They also recalled an incident during a session at EMI when Harrison appeared cradling an overwrought Spector and helped him into a waiting car. When the scruffs asked if Spector was okay, Harrison described him as "[a] great producer and a really beautiful person but very self-destructive". After the release of All Things Must Pass in November 1970, according to Pritchard, Spector wrote a letter to the scruffs, c/o "The Steps" at 3 Savile Row, and he continued to send them cards.

The scruffs assembled at Apple on 12 March 1971, the day that the High Court of Justice ruled in McCartney's favour to dissolve the Beatles as a legal partnership. Pritchard recalled that Lennon's white Rolls-Royce arrived and he, Harrison and Starr tumbled out laughing uncontrollably, with "tears streaming down their faces". She and the other scruffs "wondered what they were on". According to another account, which Beatles historian Keith Badman attributes to the Apple scruffs, the three former bandmates first drove to McCartney's house, where Lennon climbed the wall and threw two bricks through the windows. (Note: Author Peter Doggett queries this version of events. He comments that Lennon, Harrison and Starr were said to have driven to McCartney's home from the High Court, yet none of the Beatles attended court that day.)

== Magazine ==
At the start of 1970, shortly before the Beatles' break-up, the scruffs started their own magazine, The Apple Scruffs Monthly Book. Lennon enjoyed reading it; when each issue became available, he would be heard laughing uproariously in his office at the comments about him and Ono. Taylor said the magazine was "hilarious" though also "quite cruel at times", and reflective of how the scruffs often had a better perspective on life at Apple than those on the inside, "because they weren't caught up in the details."

Several scruffs disliked McCartney's wife Linda, partly out of loyalty towards his former fiancée, Jane Asher. The final issue of Apple Scruffs Monthly depicted Linda as a big-breasted dominatrix who bullied her husband.

== Image ==
I used to imagine that if I could only discover why the scruffs were out there I might understand why I was here on the inside ... It's like the ravens at the Tower of London. You couldn't really imagine them not being there ... I saw the scruffs as just another loveable but crazy part of all that mayhem [at Apple].

— Derek Taylor, 1996

McCartney's wedding was the subject of heavy press coverage, which showed the Apple scruffs and other fans in mourning at losing the last romantically available Beatle. Margo Stevens recalled reporters pushing her towards the newspaper and TV cameras, and goading her to add to the spectacle by weeping harder; episodes such as this taught the scruffs to distrust the press, she said, since they "didn't understand us and made everyone look like idiots". She included Aronowitz's 1970 piece for the New York Post as an example of misrepresentation in the press. Among his comments in the article, Aronowitz wrote: "Sometimes George would record from 7 p.m. to 7 a.m. and there they would be, waiting through the night, beggars for a sign of recognition on his way in or out." Wendy Sutcliffe, who first came to London to look for the Beatles in 1967, recalled that this issue was what especially impressed them about Harrison's tribute song: "[he] understood how we felt and ... knew we weren't just sad, stupid girlies." (Note: In his album review for The New York Times, Don Heckman said that "Apple Scruffs" concerned the "young girls" waiting tirelessly at Apple for "hasty glances at their heroes".)

The scruffs converged on the Apple Corps building on 10 April 1970 following McCartney's announcement that the band had broken up. Asked by a reporter whether anyone could ever replace the Beatles, Carol Bedford said that no one could, and that the scruffs had grown up and developed in tandem with the Beatles' developments. A CBS News report predicted that the gathering at 3 Savile Row was "only the beginning", since, "The event is so momentous that historians may one day view it as a landmark in the decline of the British Empire."

Chris O'Dell, an Apple employee and the inspiration for Harrison's song "Miss O'Dell", described the Apple scruffs as "the most loyal and loving of all the fans". She said that they conferred "the fairy dust of fame" on those they recognised as part of the Beatles' wider circle. Bobby Whitlock, one of the backing musicians on All Things Must Pass, wrote of the Apple scruffs: "All they really wanted was to touch us or just have an autograph. Mostly it was just to see us and give us a flower ... They were all very sweet and cute."

== Disbandment ==
The scruffs began drifting apart as they grew older and also because several objected to McCartney's actions in dissolving the Beatles as a legal partnership. When Harrison attended the opening of the refurbished Apple Studio at 3 Savile Row, in October 1971, the NME reported that the scruffs were "still around in force".

In Alan Clayson's view, the Apple scruffs' vigils ended through the individuals' personal maturation along with "the realisation that the Beatles as a 1960s myth would long outlive the mere mortals that constituted its dramatis personae". According to Bill Harry, the scruffs disbanded in December 1973, when Apple vacated its offices at Savile Row.

The scruffs were drawn together again in the wake of Lennon's murder in New York City on 8 December 1980. As part of an international day of mourning on Sunday, 14 December, crowds gathered outside Abbey Road Studios, where Pritchard still worked. She recalled that, following a silent vigil, the studio engineers played Lennon's "Imagine" at full volume. She added that for the former Apple scruffs, it was especially tragic to learn that the murder had been committed by a "crazed fan".

Bedford wrote a memoir titled Waiting for the Beatles: An Apple Scruff's Story, published by Blandford Press in 1984. She promoted it with an interview on the London radio station LBC in April that year. In his 2013 novel She's Leaving Home, author William Shaw cast the Apple scruffs as characters involved in a murder investigation. In a 2014 article he wrote for Rolling Stone about this and subsequent fan phenomenons, Shaw states:

There are Beliebers, One Directioners, Miley Cyrus's Smilers and Beyoncé's Beyhive. There have been Blockheads and Duranies. But there will never, ever be any group of fans as legendary and as sweetly original as the Beatles' most devoted admirers, the Apple Scruffs. Because not only did the Apple Scruffs follow the most celebrated and innovative musical foursome that pop music has produced, they helped keep the band sane.
