= Olivia Harrison =

American author and film producer (born 1948)

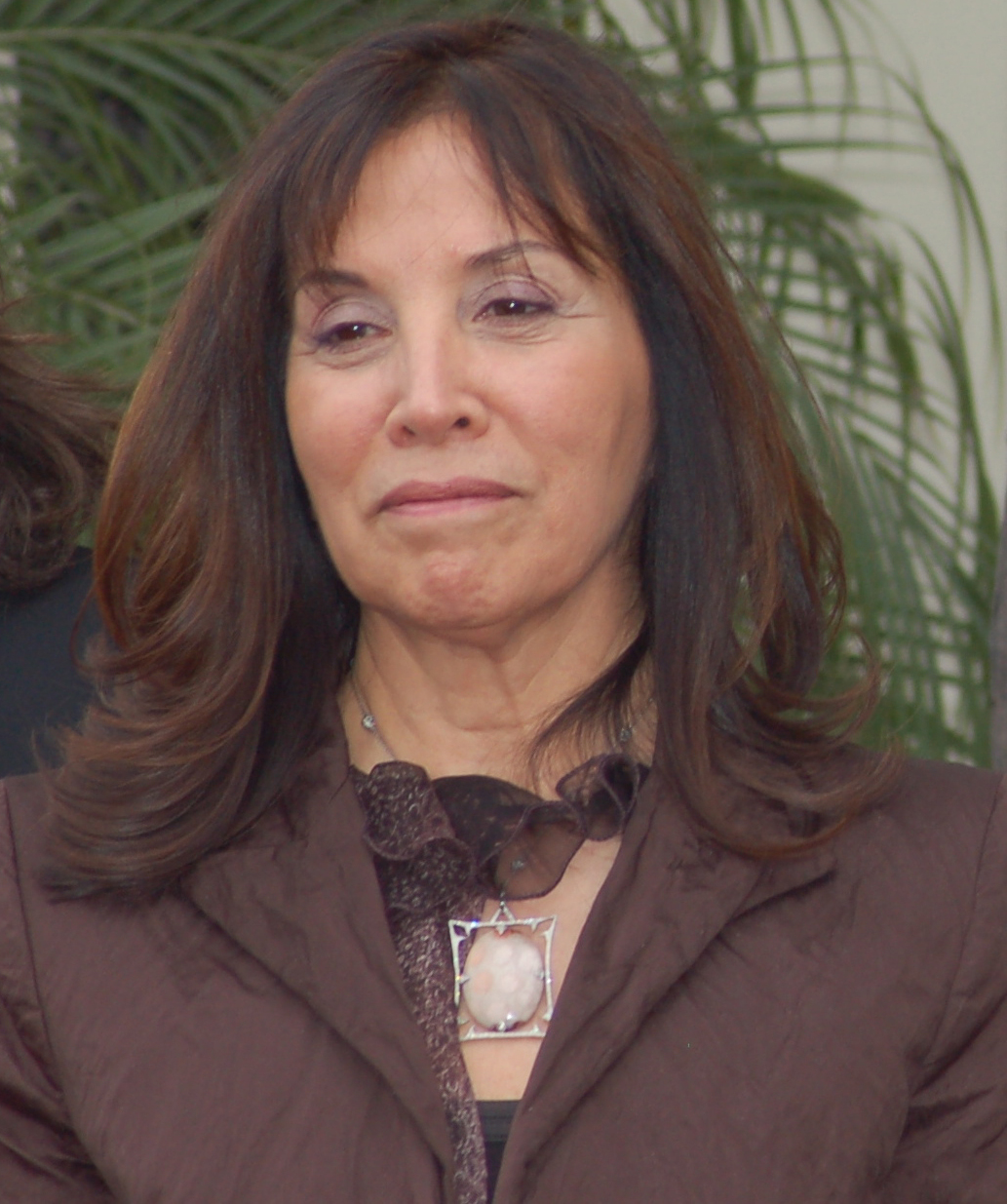
- Harrison in 2009
- Born: Olivia Trinidad Arias; May 18, 1948 (age 78); Los Angeles, California, U.S.
- Occupations: Film producer; author; curator; philanthropist
- Years active: 1972–present
- Spouse: George Harrison (m. 1978; died 2001)
- Children: Dhani Harrison

Olivia Trinidad Harrison (née Arias; born May 18, 1948) is an American author and film producer, and the widow of English musician George Harrison of the Beatles. She first worked in the music industry in Los Angeles, for A&M Records, where she met Harrison and then helped run his Dark Horse record label. In 1990, she launched the Romanian Angel Appeal to raise funds for the thousands of orphans left abandoned in Romania after the fall of Communism.

Since her husband's death in 2001, Olivia has continued George's international aid efforts through projects in partnership with UNICEF, and is the curator of film, book and music releases related to his legacy. She represents his voice on the Beatles' Apple Corps board and is similarly a director of his charity organisation, the Material World Foundation (MWF). Under the auspices of MWF, she has sponsored the preservation of film history in collaboration with American director Martin Scorsese. These restoration projects include short films by Charlie Chaplin and works from 1940s Mexican cinema.

She and her husband shared an interest in Eastern mysticism and spiritual practice, and her presence in his life, starting in the mid-1970s, began a period of more optimistic content in Harrison's music. At their Friar Park home in December 1999, she was recognized as having saved her husband's life after she overpowered a knife-wielding intruder who had stabbed George. Among Harrison's film projects, her production of Concert for George won the Grammy Award for Best Long Form Music Video in 2005, and her co-production of Scorsese's 2011 documentary George Harrison: Living in the Material World won an Emmy Award in the category "Outstanding Documentary or Nonfiction Special". She authored books to accompany both these films, and in 2017 compiled a revised edition of George's 1980 autobiography, I, Me, Mine. Her son with George, Dhani Harrison, is also a musician.

== Life ==
=== Childhood and music industry career ===
Arias was born in Los Angeles. Her grandparents migrated to California, having grown up in Guanajuato in central Mexico. Her father Zeke was a dry cleaner, and her mother Mary Louise worked as a seamstress; her siblings include Peter and Louise. Spending her early childhood in Los Angeles, she grew up in a Mexican, Spanish-speaking environment. In a 2016 interview, she recalled that Mexican music and films were a regular part of her upbringing, with Zeke having been a singer and guitarist, and that Jorge Negrete, Trío Calaveras and Trío Los Panchos were among the artists she enjoyed. Later in her youth her family moved west to Hawthorne where she attended Hawthorne High School in the 1960s.

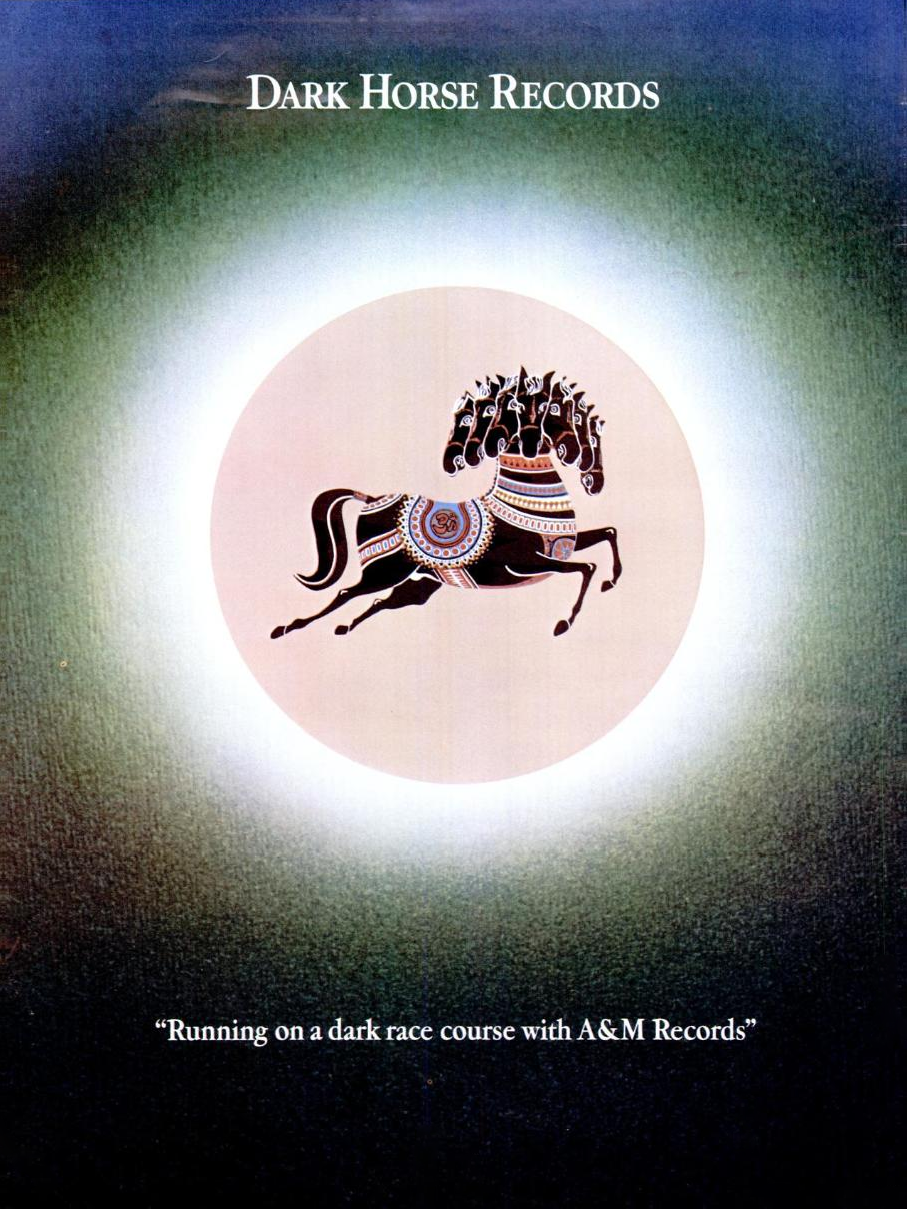
1974 trade ad for Dark Horse Records

In 1972, she began working for A&M Records, at the former site of Charlie Chaplin Studios in Hollywood. By 1974, as a member of the marketing department, she regularly liaised by long-distance telephone with George Harrison, whose new record label, Dark Horse, was distributed by A&M. Impressed with Arias, Harrison arranged for her to work exclusively for Dark Horse Records. The pair met for the first time in October 1974 and soon became romantically involved. Until the late 1970s, Arias worked with a roster of artists that included Ravi Shankar, Splinter, Stairsteps, Attitudes, Keni Burke and Henry McCullough. According to author Robert Rodriguez, she was "a capable and even-tempered administrator, ably handling the routine chaos involved with setting up a record label and dealing with all manner of personalities".

Before meeting Harrison, Arias had studied meditation with the Indian guru Maharaj-ji. Their shared interest in spirituality, together with a lifestyle incorporating vegetarianism, had a calming effect on Harrison, whose reliance on alcohol and other drugs Arias helped curb. His 1976 album Thirty Three & 1/3 conveyed a more contented outlook in which he expressed his faith without the disapproving tone that, for many music critics, had marred his previous two albums. While accompanying Harrison on his promotional campaign for Thirty Three & 1/3, Arias told an interviewer: "We have a nice relationship. When you strive for something higher in the next world, you have a much easier time in this one."

=== Marriage to George Harrison ===
Arias gave birth to the couple's son Dhani Harrison at Princess Christian Nursing Home on 1 August 1978. The following month, Olivia and George married in a private ceremony at the Henley-on-Thames Register Office in England. Their contentment during this period was again reflected in George's music, much of which he wrote at their holiday property on Maui in Hawaii. His self-titled 1979 album includes the song "Dark Sweet Lady," which he said best captured the renewal Arias had provided in his life. (Note: She has cited "Your Love Is Forever" from the same album as one of her favourites, along with his 1970 song "Run of the Mill".)

She was also habitually present in the recording studio with her husband. Producer Giles Martin said that she was often the one operating the recording button.

Following John Lennon's murder in New York in December 1980, Olivia, George and Dhani spent much of the early 1980s travelling in the Pacific region, alternately residing in Hana on Maui, and Hamilton Island in the north-east of Australia. As the wife of a former Beatle, Olivia largely stayed out of the public spotlight. During the late 1980s, she supported George's campaign to save Henley's Regal Cinema from redevelopment by the John Lewis supermarket chain, and campaigned with Ringo Starr's wife, Barbara Bach, on behalf of Parents for Safe Food. In 1989, she was the target of hate mail and death threats at George's and her Henley estate, Friar Park, the details of which were kept secret until a London police officer leaked the story to the press the following year. (Note: Originally signing themselves as "Rosalind,” the perpetrators were an American hippie couple living in Battersea in south London. The couple told the police that they held a grudge against Olivia Harrison after clashing with her "on another planet.”)

It was sort of a gradual assault on my conscience … I decided that perhaps we should try to raise some money. I went to Romania and was just overwhelmed, devastated and shocked by the starvation.

— Harrison on her motivation for starting the Romanian Angel Appeal in 1990

In 1990, she fully embraced the media spotlight, in reaction to the plight of around 100,000 Romanian orphans left abandoned amid the chaos that followed the deposing of Romania's Communist leader, Nicolae Ceaușescu. After visiting Romania in early April, she said she was "overwhelmed, devastated and shocked" by the suffering she had witnessed. That same month, she founded the Romanian Angel Appeal (RAA) to provide aid to the children, having enlisted support from the other Beatles' wives: Bach, Linda McCartney and Yoko Ono. George helped her promote the appeal on British television and radio, and, with his Traveling Wilburys bandmates, recorded a cover version of the song "Nobody's Child" to help raise funds for the orphans.

In October 1992, she wrote to The Guardian to express her disgust with the author Geoffrey Giuliano, who had recently published a biography of her husband. She accused Giuliano of falsifying a brief acquaintance with George into a friendship and criticised his depiction of Paul McCartney, whom Giuliano had dismissed as "vacuous and shallow".

On December 30, 1999, George and Olivia were attacked by a deranged man who broke into Friar Park. George went downstairs after hearing noises. Moments later, George returned, followed by the intruder, and was stabbed multiple times. Olivia attacked the assailant with a fireplace poker and a heavy table lamp, and he turned on her. After the local police arrived and detained the intruder, the Harrisons were treated for their wounds at a hospital. The man was quoted as saying he was on a "mission sent by God,” and that the Beatles were "witches.” The home invasion was a front-page news story around the world, with some headlines recognising Olivia as having "saved" her husband. (Note: Referring to her bravery during the ordeal, Tom Petty joked in a fax to George: "Aren't you glad you married a Mexican girl?" According to Rodriguez, further to her "rescu[ing] George from the perils of rock stardom" in the 1970s, Olivia's actions represented the second time she had saved his life.) The attack followed the arrest of a female stalker who had broken into the Harrisons' Maui home on December 23. In a 2005 interview, Olivia said of the December 30 incident: "I remember everything about it, every millisecond. I was terrified, but it is one of those things that you just do in a heightened state of awareness so that you can never really forget any of it."

=== George's death and aftermath ===
George's injuries from the Friar Park attack were more severe than was reported in the press and led to the removal of a portion of one of his lungs. Within a year, the cancer that he had beaten through treatment in 1998 returned in the form of lung cancer. Olivia and Dhani were at his bedside when he died in Los Angeles on November 29, 2001. She later remembered him in a Sunday Times interview: "George was the funniest man I knew. When he died, I felt 'Oh, no, the party's over' … He didn't put up with any crabbiness – other than his own."

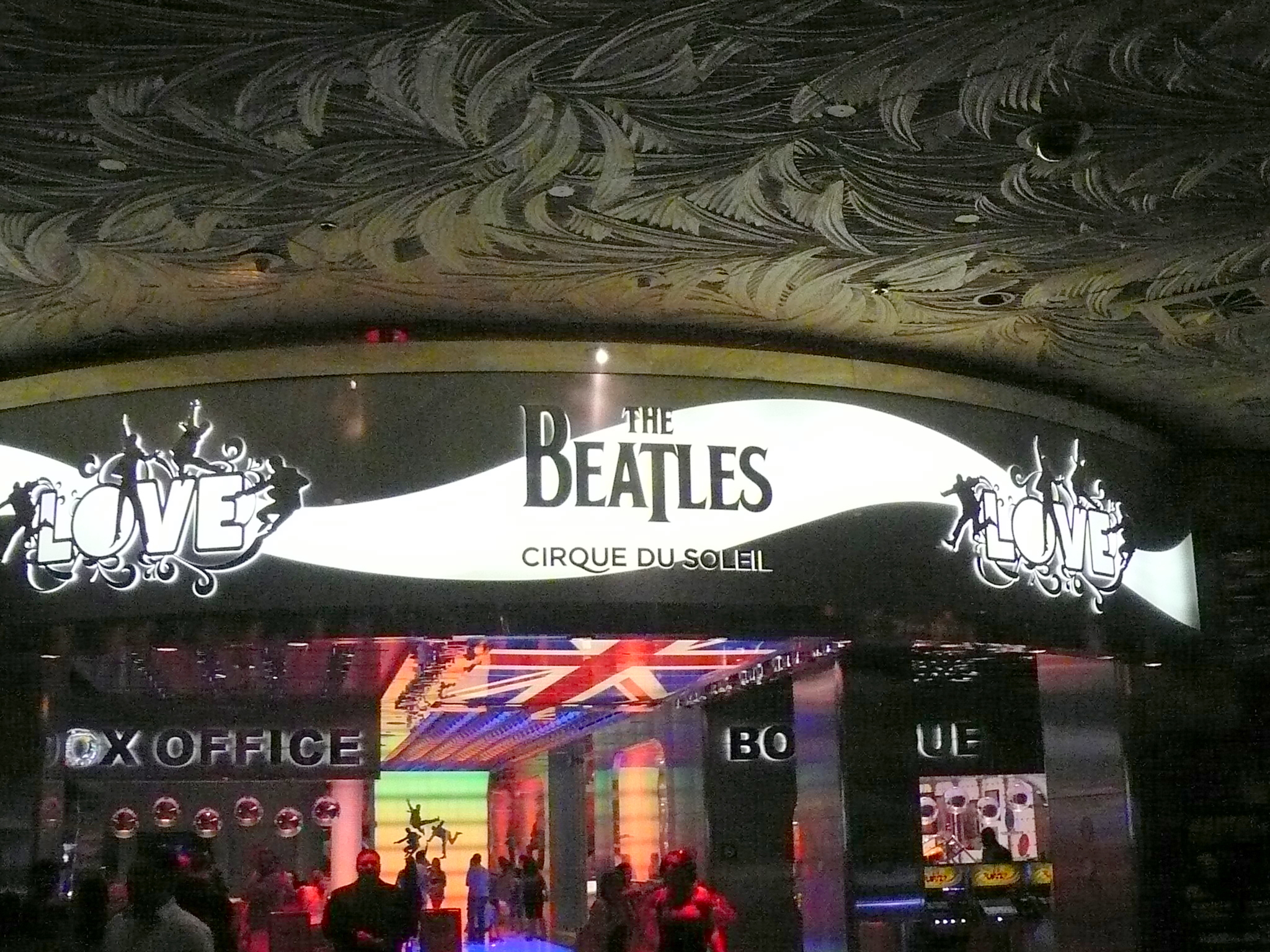
Love Theatre, at the Mirage hotel in Las Vegas. Cirque du Soleil's Love is among the projects overseen by Harrison in her role as co-controller of the Beatles' commercial rights.

Harrison spent a period in seclusion while mourning her loss. In 2004, she alleged that Gilbert Lederman, a doctor at Staten Island University Hospital, where George received experimental radiation therapy before travelling to Los Angeles, had acted inappropriately by forcing him to listen to the doctor's young son playing guitar and, while in pain and lacking his mental faculties, autograph the boy's guitar. The suit, which also addressed Lederman's discussion of the former Beatle's condition with the media, was settled out of court with a stipulation that the guitar be destroyed. (Note: In another episode, in January 2002, Harrison launched a lawsuit against her sister's ex-husband, Carl Roles, for selling items of memorabilia he had stolen from the Harrisons' home in the late 1970s. Roles announced that the items were for sale on the day after George died.)

Following her husband's death, Harrison joined Yoko Ono (Lennon's widow), Paul McCartney, and Ringo Starr in managing the Beatles musical and financial legacy, as one of the five directors of Apple Corps. In June 2006, she attended the Las Vegas launch of the Beatles' Love stage show, a project George had initiated through his friendship with Guy Laliberté of Cirque du Soleil. She appeared on stage at Microsoft's E3 press conference in June 2009, again with Ono, McCartney, and Starr, to promote The Beatles: Rock Band.

== Film production, album reissues and book projects ==
In November 2002, Olivia Harrison produced the Concert for George tribute, which featured Eric Clapton, Jeff Lynne, Billy Preston, Tom Petty, Shankar, Starr and McCartney, along with Dhani. Held at London's Royal Albert Hall and filmed by director David Leland, the event was presented under the auspices of George's Material World Foundation; all proceeds from the concert and subsequent album, film and book releases went to the foundation for dispersal to charities that he and the family supported. Harrison's video production for the Concert for George film received the Grammy Award for Best Long Form Music Video in 2005. She wrote the introduction to the 2002 reissue of George's autobiography, I, Me, Mine, and authored the book Concert for George, which was published by Genesis Publications in 2005.

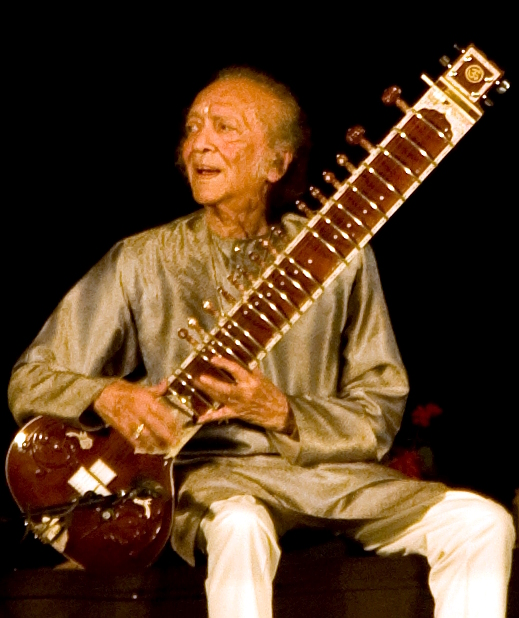
Ravi Shankar in 2009

Harrison has overseen reissue campaigns of her late husband's recording catalogue. In early 2005, she operated out of an office in London's Knightsbridge area; while in Los Angeles at that time, she used Dark Horse's offices in Santa Monica. She helped Dhani compile the Dark Horse Years box set in 2004 and wrote an introduction on the history of Dark Horse Records in the accompanying booklet. She co-produced the Concert for Bangladesh Revisited documentary accompanying the 2005 reissue of the Concert for Bangladesh album and film. She was reissue producer (with Dhani) of Living in the Material World in 2006. In 2007, Harrison produced the documentary included in the Traveling Wilburys box set The Traveling Wilburys Collection. In 2010, she served as compilation producer of George's works with Ravi Shankar, in a box set titled Collaborations – a project she described as a "labor of love for me". In addition to designing the elaborate packaging with Drew Lorimer, she oversaw the collection and restoration of long-lost footage of a 1974 Music Festival from India performance from the Royal Albert Hall.

She co-produced the Martin Scorsese documentary George Harrison: Living in the Material World (2011), and appeared with Scorsese at Cannes in 2010 and in New York City in the summer of 2011 promoting it. In a radio interview with Leonard Lopate for WNYC, she said that the film had involved five years of work and that it was a project George had hoped to undertake himself after working on the Beatles Anthology series in the mid 1990s. She also authored the accompanying book, George Harrison: Living in the Material World, published by Abrams. The film won two awards at the 2012 Emmy Awards, with Harrison and her fellow producers being recognised in the category "Outstanding Documentary or Nonfiction Special".

For the 2014 reissue of George's Apple Records solo albums, overseen by Dhani, Harrison directed a seven-minute film, The Apple Years, which was included on the DVD in the eight-disc box set of the same name. She compiled a revised edition of I, Me, Mine (subtitled The Extended Edition), which was published by Genesis in February 2017. The updated work involved her searching for George's handwritten lyrics and notes for songs that he had omitted from the 1980 book or had written in the years following its original publication. She told Rolling Stone magazine, referring to her dedication to preserving his legacy: "I have an overdeveloped sense of duty. It obviously means everything to me."

Following her work with Scorsese on Living in the Material World, Harrison has funded film restoration projects undertaken by his non-profit organization The Film Foundation. Through the Material World Foundation, she first financed the restoration of some Charlie Chaplin short films and then of works from Mexico's "Golden Age" of cinema. (Note: In an interview she gave in Morelia in Mexico, when attending the city's 2016 film festival, Harrison said that she had also funded the restoration of "an English movie and then a Russian movie".) Emilio Fernández's Enamorada (1946), one of three Mexican titles restored by The Film Foundation up to mid 2018, was presented by Scorsese at the Cannes Film Festival that year.

In 2021, along with the surviving members of the Beatles and Yoko Ono, she produced the documentary The Beatles: Get Back. For this documentary she won her second Emmy as producer in the Outstanding Documentary or Nonfiction Series category. The documentary went on to win five Emmy awards in total.

In 2022 she won a second Grammy award as a producer for the reissued limited edition of All Things Must Pass. In June 2022, she published a poetic autobiography, Came the Lightening; she was inspired to write the book by the works of Edna St. Vincent Millay.

== Philanthropy ==
As of 2002, Harrison's 1990 Romanian Angel initiative was still active. In May 1990, before the release of the fundraising single and album, ten trucks filled with food, medical supplies and clothing, together with 32 aid workers, were dispatched to Romania. According to Harrison, all the funds raised by the appeal went directly to the cause, as the administrative costs were paid for by her and the other RAA founders. In September 2000, she and George met with local representatives to monitor the progress of the RAA-funded programs for orphanage sanitation and professional staff.

Harrison has continued to develop George's philanthropic initiatives. She is a director of the Material World Foundation (MWF), which he established in 1973 to "sponsor diverse forms of artistic expression and to encourage the exploration of alternative life views and philosophies", and of the Harrison Family Foundation. The Harrison Family Scholarship was launched by the MWF in 2002. It awards scholarships at Brown University in the United States, with preference given to non-American students, especially those from India and Mexico.

In late 2005, coinciding with the reissue of the album and film from the 1971 Concert for Bangladesh, she established The George Harrison Fund for UNICEF with an initial focus on programs in Bangladesh. As of July 2015, the fund had also assisted children affected by civil conflict, natural disasters or poverty in Brazil, India, Angola, Romania, the Horn of Africa, Burma and Nepal. Harrison contributed to actress Salma Hayek's UNICEF fundraising campaign in response to the September 2017 Mexican earthquakes. Through the auspices of The George Harrison Fund for UNICEF, she then pledged to double the next $200,000 donation made to the campaign.

One of the fund's initiatives has been to introduce floating schools, which allow children in remote areas of Bangladesh that are affected by seasonal flooding to continue attending school. In her work as a UNICEF sponsor, she visited Bangladesh in February 2011 to oversee the fund's ongoing efforts there, and in 2015 promoted the UNICEF Kid Power program.
