= Concert for George (film) =

- DVD cover
- Directed by: David Leland
- Produced by: Ray Cooper; Olivia Harrison; Jon Kamen; Brian Roylance
- Starring: Eric Clapton; Olivia Harrison; Paul McCartney; Ringo Starr
- Cinematography: Chris Menges
- Edited by: Claire Ferguson
- Music by: George Harrison (composer); Eric Clapton (musical director)
- Distributed by: Warner Strategic Marketing
- Release date: 10 October 2003
- Running time: 146 minutes
- Country: United Kingdom
- Language: English
- Box office: $134,600

Concert for George is a 2003 British documentary film directed by David Leland that covers the events of the Concert for George, a tribute concert for George Harrison held at the Royal Albert Hall in London on 29 November 2002.

== Overview ==
A benefit for Harrison's Material World Charitable Foundation, the all-star concert took place on the day of the first anniversary of his death. Proceeds from the film also went to the Material World Charitable Foundation. The film was shot using discreet cameras from over twelve locations.

== Release ==
The film was released theatrically in Los Angeles, New York and other select locations on 3 October 2003, and was then released in the UK on 10 October. Following its release on DVD in November 2003, the film won the Best Long Form Video Grammy in 2005. One disc of the double DVD set is the theatrical version of Leland's film, while the other is the complete concert.

The film was re-released on Blu-ray as a special two-disc set on 22 March 2012.

In 2018 the film was reissued along with an album as part of Harrison's 75th birthday celebration.

== Reception ==
At Metacritic, Concert for George received a score of 82 out of 100, based on ten reviews, indicating "universal acclaim".

== Cast ==
- Eric Clapton: Himself / Musical director (concert)
- George Harrison: Himself (archive footage, uncredited)
- Gary Brooker: Himself
- Joe Brown: Himself
- Sam Brown: Herself
- Jim Capaldi: Himself
- Carol Cleveland: Herself / Best girl
- Ray Cooper: Himself / Producer (film)
- Andy Fairweather-Low: Himself
- Terry Gilliam: Himself / Barber / Mountie
- Tom Hanks: Himself / Mountie
- Dhani Harrison: Himself
- Olivia Harrison: Herself / Producer (film)
- Jools Holland: Himself
- Eric Idle: Himself / Barber / Mountie
- Neil Innes: Himself / Barber
- Terry Jones: Himself / Barber / Mountie
- Jeff Lynne: Himself / Concert audio producer (concert)
- Paul McCartney: Himself
- Michael Palin: Himself / Bevis
- Tom Petty and the Heartbreakers: Themselves
- Billy Preston: Himself
- Anoushka Shankar: Herself
- Ravi Shankar: Himself
- Ringo Starr: Himself

== Awards ==
- 2005 Grammy Award for Best Long Form Music Video

== Certifications ==
Region	Certification	Certified units/sales
Australia (ARIA)	5× Platinum	75,000^{^}
Brazil (Pro-Música Brasil)	Gold	25,000^{*}
Canada (Music Canada)	3× Platinum	30,000^{^}
United Kingdom (BPI)	Platinum	50,000^{^}
United States (RIAA)	10× Platinum	1,000,000^{^}
^{*} Sales figures based on certification alone.^{^} Shipments figures based on certification alone.
