= Deep Blue (song) =

1971 single by George Harrison

- B-side face label for 1971 single

Single by George Harrison
- A-side: "Bangla Desh"
- Released: 28 July 1971
- Recorded: 4–5 July 1971
- Studio: Record Plant West, Los Angeles
- Genre: Folk-blues
- Length: 3:47
- Label: Apple
- Songwriter: George Harrison
- Producers: George Harrison, Phil Spector

George Harrison singles chronology
"What Is Life" (1971)	"Bangla Desh" / "Deep Blue" (1971)	"Give Me Love (Give Me Peace on Earth)" (1973)

"Deep Blue" is a song by English rock musician George Harrison that was released as the B-side to his 1971 charity single "Bangla Desh". Harrison wrote the song in 1970, midway through the recording sessions for All Things Must Pass, and recorded it in Los Angeles the following year while organising the Concert for Bangladesh. The composition was inspired by the deteriorating condition of his mother, Louise, before she succumbed to cancer in July 1970, and by Harrison's feelings of helplessness as he visited her in hospital in the north of England. Given the subject matter, "Deep Blue" also served to convey the suffering endured by the millions of refugees from war-torn Bangladesh in 1971, as sickness and disease became widespread among their makeshift camps in northern India.

Following Harrison's work with American guitarist David Bromberg, "Deep Blue" features sparse instrumentation in the folk-blues style. It includes one of Harrison's first uses of dobro on a recording. The song proved popular on US radio and was listed with the A-side when "Bangla Desh" peaked at number 23 on the Billboard Hot 100 chart.

Well regarded by music critics and commentators, "Deep Blue" was out of print since the early 1970s and gained a reputation as an overlooked B-side. The re-release came in September 2006, when EMI included the song as a bonus track on the reissue of Harrison's Living in the Material World album.

== Background and inspiration ==
George Harrison's inspiration for writing "Deep Blue" was the fatal illness of his mother, Louise. The youngest of her four children, Harrison often credited his mother with encouraging his music career from a young age, and a sense of individuality generally. Although a practising Catholic, she instilled in all her children the importance of spirituality over religion, a trait that was influential in Harrison's embracing of Hinduism in 1966. Louise was also diligent in replying to her son's fan mail and, in the words of music journalist John Harris, she "stood alone among the Beatle parents as an active champion of their talents".

Harrison discussed the song at length in a 1987 interview for Musician magazine, during which he recalls that his mother developed a brain tumour late in 1969 but then recovered for seven months. After hearing of the initial diagnosis in September 1969, Harrison cancelled a recording session with Apple Records artist Jackie Lomax to see her; author Peter Doggett comments that, because of the severity of this news, Harrison would later have no recollection of how he heard of John Lennon's decision to leave the Beatles, on 20 September. (Note: In her autobiography, however, Harrison's wife Pattie Boyd recalls that Lennon arrived unexpectedly at their house and told Harrison that he was intending to quit the band.)

Although Louise's cancer had gone into remission, it returned in the spring of 1970. Exhausted from nursing her, Harrison's father, Harry, was then also hospitalised. As a result, their youngest son was "running back and forth" between Warrington and London while trying to record his first post-Beatles solo album, All Things Must Pass. Adding to the strain, Harrison would also tell Musician, he was having to assure each of his parents that the other one was okay. On 4 July, the day that his song "Something" won an Ivor Novello award, Harrison put his solo album on hold and drove north to see Louise for the last time. In his Musician interview, Harrison says that he wrote "Deep Blue" "at home one exhausted morning" during this period.

== Composition ==
Musically, the song is in the folk-blues style. Author Simon Leng notes "Deep Blue" as a comparatively rare foray into the genre for Harrison, along with "Sue Me, Sue You Blues", a song he wrote in early 1971 in response to Paul McCartney's lawsuit to dissolve the Beatles' partnership. Leng attributes the folk-blues influence primarily to Bob Dylan and American roots guitarist David Bromberg, the latter of whom Harrison had met in New York, through Dylan, shortly before beginning work on All Things Must Pass. Another Harrison biographer, Ian Inglis, writes that the style of "Deep Blue"'s "easy, unpretentious melody" is equally influenced by the Lovin' Spoonful. Harrison recalled the mix of major and minor chords as reflecting the "frustration and gloom" he experienced while visiting his mother in the cancer ward.

In what Inglis describes as a "poignant contrast" with the composer's Beatles track "Here Comes the Sun", Harrison sings that the sunshine brings him no relief, but instead leaves him "suffering in the darkness", which is "so easy come by on the roadside of one long lifetime". In his autobiography, I, Me, Mine, Harrison says of the mood he captured in the song: "it's that smell and the whole atmosphere of doom that's in those hospitals."

["Deep Blue" is] filled with frustration and gloom of going to these hospitals and the feeling of disease that permeated the atmosphere. Not being able to do anything for suffering family or loved ones is an awful experience.

— Harrison to Musician magazine, November 1987

The lyrics bear out the powerlessness he felt while someone dear to him died, specifically in the second verse:

When you stand there, watch tired bodies
Full of sickness and pain to show you
Just how helpless you really are ...

Harrison was at Louise's bedside until her death on 7 July. According to Rolling Stone contributor Mikal Gilmore, he read passages to her from a text about the Bhagavad Gita, "commenting on the sacred book's views of death as a changeover rather than a termination". In "Deep Blue"'s final verse, Harrison's lyrics likewise focus on spirituality:

When I think of the life I'm living
Pray God help me, give me your light
So I can love you and understand
This repetition that keeps me here feeling deep blue ...

Harrison was alone with his mother at the end, author Joshua Greene writes, and when she began to slip into unconsciousness, he "put down the book and began chanting softly into her ear". Inglis views the lyrics to "Deep Blue" as exemplifying Harrison's "fondness for family". (Note: Another track that Inglis highlights among its composer's family-oriented songs is "Unknown Delight", written about the birth of Harrison's son, Dhani.) Pattie Boyd, Harrison's wife at the time, recalls that Louise had withheld the seriousness of her condition from him for eight weeks before September 1969, "in case George was busy" with his career, and that, following her death, Harrison was anxious about how his father would manage alone. Keen to strengthen the familial bond, Harrison invited his brothers Harold and Pete to live on his Friar Park estate in Oxfordshire, along with their father.

== Recording ==
Within a year of Louise Harrison's death, Harry was staying in Los Angeles with Harrison and Boyd, while Harrison worked with Ravi Shankar on the soundtrack to the film Raga. A Bengali Hindu, Shankar was distraught at the news of the humanitarian disaster then occurring in East Pakistan, following the outbreak of the Bangladesh Liberation War in March 1971. After fleeing the war zone in their homeland, an estimated 7 million refugees were being accommodated in inadequate camps in India, where diseases such as cholera had become rife. Shankar later recalled that Harrison was deeply moved by his request for help in aiding the Bengali refugees, as a result of which he committed to staging the Concert for Bangladesh in New York that summer. Author Elliot Huntley suggests that, having been incapable of assuaging his mother's pain as she lay dying in 1970, Harrison gained extra motivation from "a situation his fame and commercial cache could do something to alleviate".

As a B-side for the hastily written "Bangla Desh", which he composed to bring attention to the cause, Harrison chose to record "Deep Blue". In the Bangladesh context of 1971, author Bruce Spizer writes, the song made a suitable, "intimately chilling" companion to the hard-charging lead track. Harrison recorded "Deep Blue" in Los Angeles, at the Record Plant West on 4–5 July, while organising the benefit concerts to be held at New York's Madison Square Garden on 1 August. (Note: The recording details of 4–5 July 1971 in Los Angeles are consistent with statements by authors Keith Badman and Simon Leng, the last of whom interviewed Concert for Bangladesh participants Klaus Voormann and Jim Horn for his book. In Eight Arms to Hold You, however, Chip Madinger and Mark Easter suggest that "Deep Blue" might have been a 1970 All Things Must Pass outtake "dusted off for release", based on Harrison's comments in I, Me, Mine about writing the song. According to Spizer, the session took place at Friar Park.)

In contrast with the extravagant sound normally associated with co-producer Phil Spector's work, "Deep Blue" received a sparse musical arrangement. Underpinned by Jim Keltner's kick drum, the recording features three distinctive guitar parts, all performed by Harrison – two finger-picked acoustic guitars, along with fills played on a dobro. Leng cites Bromberg's influence again in Harrison's acoustic guitar playing on the track and considers the American guitarist to have been Harrison's inspiration for adopting the dobro, the two musicians having recently collaborated on "The Holdup" for Bromberg's debut solo album. The dobro had since become "something of a party piece for him", Leng writes, as "Deep Blue" preceded 1971 releases by John Lennon, Gary Wright and Billy Preston that each featured Harrison "cameos" on the instrument. (Note: The respective albums were Imagine, Footprint and I Wrote a Simple Song.)

The only other musician on the session for "Deep Blue", bassist Klaus Voormann, recalls that he, Harry Harrison and Memphis producer Don Nix then travelled to Nashville and explored the American South, before heading to New York for the concert rehearsals. "Deep Blue" appeared on Harrison's initial setlist at the rehearsals, but was not performed at either of the two Concert for Bangladesh shows.

== Release ==
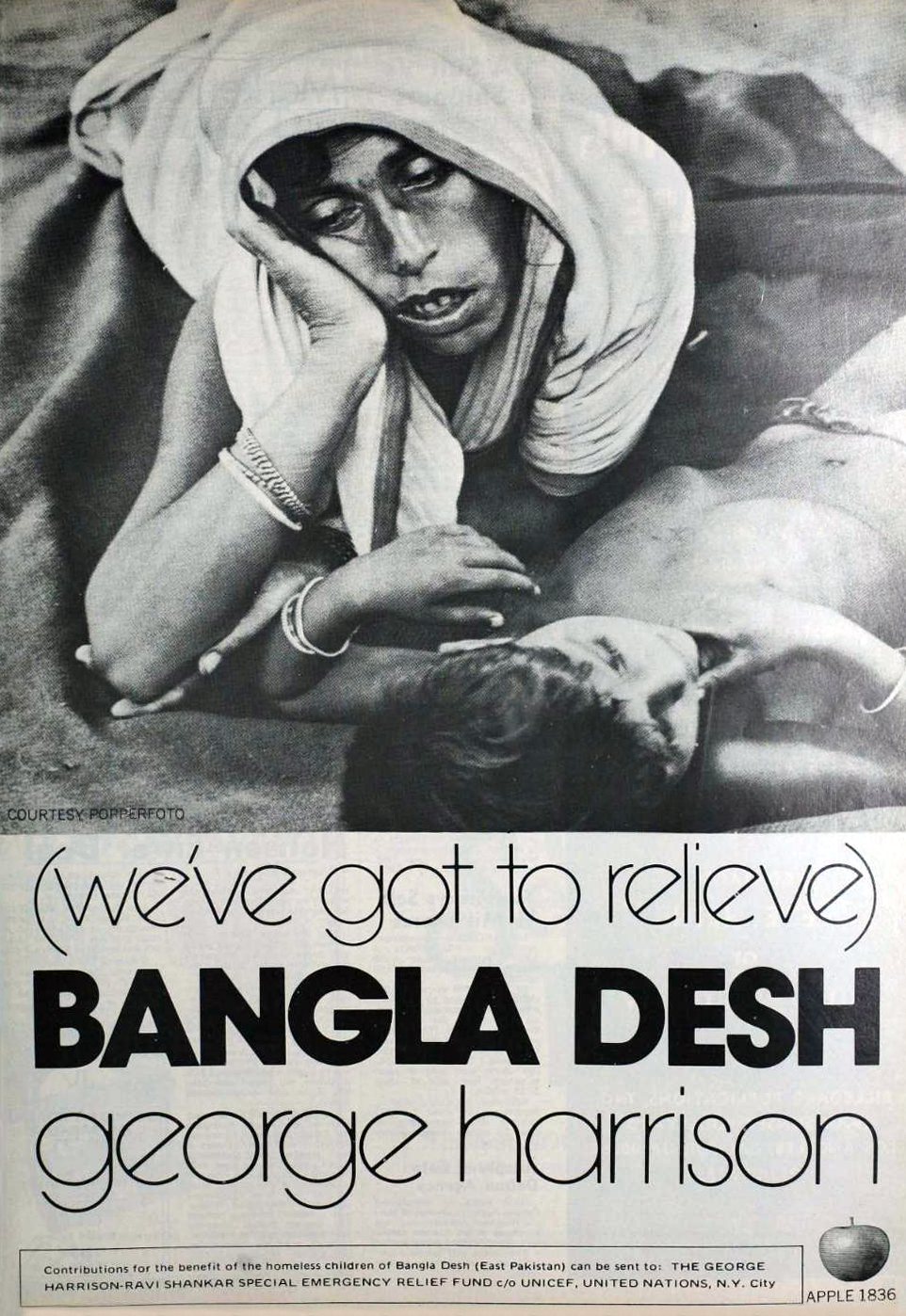
Trade ad for the "Bangla Desh" single, August 1971

Apple Records issued the "Bangla Desh" / "Deep Blue" single on 28 July 1971 in the United States (as Apple 1836) and 30 July in Britain (R 5912). Before then, Apple's US distributor, Capitol Records, had manufactured one-sided promo discs, featuring just "Bangla Desh", with the result that the lead side had already received considerable airplay in the build-up to the concerts. The release was accompanied by a trade advertisement that reflected the emotion conveyed in "Deep Blue", of someone watching a loved one "waste away", Spizer writes; in this case, the image depicted a mother attempting to comfort her starving child.

The B-side was a popular track in its own right at the time of release. In his 1987 feature on Harrison, in Musician, music journalist Timothy White described the song as having been "a jukebox favorite in bars in the [United] States". By 11 September, when the single reached its peak position on America's Billboard Hot 100, at number 23, radio programmers had opted for "Deep Blue" and the entry appeared as a double A-side in the chart listings. The single enjoyed more success on the other two US national charts, peaking at number 20 on Cash Box and number 13 on Record World. In a chart compiled by Poland's Music Clubs' Co-Ordination Council, "Deep Blue" was listed at number 1 in December 1971, just ahead of "Bangla Desh".

== Reissue ==
Musician magazine: You've drawn some strong statements from sorrow, "Deep Blue" was very affecting …
Harrison: I'm glad you noticed that one ... I got the impression people never heard a lot of these [B-sides].

— Harrison discussing the song with Timothy White in 1987

The 1971 single remained the only official release for "Deep Blue" for over 30 years, during which the song was largely forgotten. In his conversations with Derek Taylor over 1978–79 for I, Me, Mine, Harrison acknowledged that the track had become "a bit obscure". Inglis suggests that its exclusion from any album releases was because the lyrics' "raw imagery" confined the track to a "very specific personal and political relevance" within the Bangladesh context.

After the expiration of Harrison's contract with Capitol in 1976, this and other non-album B-sides were among the notable omissions from The Best of George Harrison, a compilation that ignored many popular songs from his solo career in favour of an LP side of Beatles tracks. That same year, Harrison signed with Warner Bros. Records, whose staff producer Ted Templeman expressed his admiration for "Deep Blue". As a result, Harrison wrote a song in the same musical style, the more upbeat "Soft-Hearted Hana", for his 1979 album George Harrison.

From the mid-1990s, "Deep Blue" became available on Harrison bootleg compilations such as Pirate Songs and Through Many Years. Along with "Miss O'Dell", a song he wrote in Los Angeles partly about the Bangladesh crisis, it was finally given an official CD release in September 2006, as a bonus track on Harrison's remastered Living in the Material World album. "Deep Blue" also appears on the 2014 Apple Years 1968–75 reissue of the album.

== Reception ==
"Deep Blue" impressed the notably anti-Harrison Village Voice critic Robert Christgau, who considered the song on a par with "Here Comes the Sun" and "My Sweet Lord", while noting its status as a track "hidden away" on a B-side. In their 2000 book on the four ex-Beatles' solo recordings, Chip Madinger and Mark Easter wrote of "Deep Blue": "The track's understated instrumentation and perceptive lyrical content make this one of the best, yet most overlooked songs in George's catalog." In a 2001 appraisal of Harrison's Apple recordings, for Record Collector, Peter Doggett opined that Harrison had "tucked away an acoustic gem" on the B-side to "Bangla Desh" and described the song as "a sad but still buoyant lament inspired by his regular visits to his dying mother's bedside". Former Melody Maker editor Richard Williams writes that "Harrison sings [it] very confidently, feeling no need to bury his voice in waves of production. His bottleneck work is beautifully restrained."

Among reviews of the Living in the Material World reissue, John Metzger of The Music Box calls "Deep Blue" a "loose, swinging acoustic blues". Writing for AllMusic, Bruce Eder views it as an "important bonus track", as well as "a fantastic showcase" for Harrison's acoustic guitar playing.

Theologian Dale Allison recognises "Deep Blue" as Harrison's "musically beautiful and lyrically moving" response to his mother's death, a "prayer to God for help, light, love, and understanding in the midst of personal grief". Ian Inglis praises the song's "uncluttered production and economical backing", adding: "'Deep Blue' is unlike anything he had written or recorded at that time, and its relative obscurity is undeserved." While comparing the song favourably with better-known compositions by Lennon ("Julia") and McCartney ("Yesterday", "Let It Be"), Inglis concludes: "Where they differ is that Harrison's song is about himself as much as it is about his mother; her death is a starting point for an exploration of the 'suffering' and 'darkness' that afflict us all." Elliot Huntley describes it as "a plaintive acoustic guitar tune" that became an "unjustly overlooked B-side".

Simon Leng sees "Deep Blue" as a candidate for what he terms "the 'last great B-side' accolade", rivalling Harrison's Beatles tracks "The Inner Light" and "Old Brown Shoe". Leng also considers it to be a "worthy companion" to Dylan's New Morning album and the work of Bromberg and Ry Cooder.

== Personnel ==
The following musicians contributed to the recording of "Deep Blue":

- George Harrison – vocals, acoustic guitars, Dobro
- Klaus Voormann – bass
- Jim Keltner – drums

== Sources ==
- Dale C. Allison Jr., The Love There That's Sleeping: The Art and Spirituality of George Harrison, Continuum (New York, NY, 2006; ISBN 978-0-8264-1917-0).
- Keith Badman, The Beatles Diary Volume 2: After the Break-Up 1970–2001, Omnibus Press (London, 2001; ISBN 0-7119-8307-0).
- Pattie Boyd (with Penny Junor), Wonderful Today: The Autobiography, Headline Review (London, 2007; ISBN 978-0-7553-1646-5).
- Harry Castleman & Walter J. Podrazik, All Together Now: The First Complete Beatles Discography 1961–1975, Ballantine Books (New York, NY, 1976; ISBN 0-345-25680-8).
- Alan Clayson, George Harrison, Sanctuary (London, 2003; ISBN 1-86074-489-3).
- Peter Doggett, You Never Give Me Your Money: The Beatles After the Breakup, It Books (New York, NY, 2011; ISBN 978-0-06-177418-8).
- The Editors of Rolling Stone, Harrison, Rolling Stone Press/Simon & Schuster (New York, NY, 2002; ISBN 0-7432-3581-9).
- Joshua M. Greene, Here Comes the Sun: The Spiritual and Musical Journey of George Harrison, John Wiley & Sons (Hoboken, NJ, 2006; ISBN 978-0-470-12780-3).
- John Harris, "A Quiet Storm", Mojo, July 2001.
- George Harrison, I Me Mine, Chronicle Books (San Francisco, CA, 2002; ISBN 0-8118-3793-9).
- Olivia Harrison, George Harrison: Living in the Material World, Abrams (New York, NY, 2011; ISBN 978-1-4197-0220-4).
- Elliot J. Huntley, Mystical One: George Harrison – After the Break-up of the Beatles, Guernica Editions (Toronto, ON, 2006; ISBN 1-55071-197-0).
- Ian Inglis, The Words and Music of George Harrison, Praeger (Santa Barbara, CA, 2010; ISBN 978-0-313-37532-3).
- Peter Lavezzoli, The Dawn of Indian Music in the West, Continuum (New York, NY, 2006; ISBN 0-8264-2819-3).
- Simon Leng, While My Guitar Gently Weeps: The Music of George Harrison, Hal Leonard (Milwaukee, WI, 2006; ISBN 1-4234-0609-5).
- Chip Madinger & Mark Easter, Eight Arms to Hold You: The Solo Beatles Compendium, 44.1 Productions (Chesterfield, MO, 2000; ISBN 0-615-11724-4).
- Chris O'Dell (with Katherine Ketcham), Miss O'Dell: My Hard Days and Long Nights with The Beatles, The Stones, Bob Dylan, Eric Clapton, and the Women They Loved, Touchstone (New York, NY, 2009; ISBN 978-1-4165-9093-4).
- Nicholas Schaffner, The Beatles Forever, McGraw-Hill (New York, NY, 1978; ISBN 0-07-055087-5).
- Ravi Shankar, Raga Mala: The Autobiography of Ravi Shankar, Welcome Rain (New York, NY, 1999; ISBN 1-56649-104-5).
- Bruce Spizer, The Beatles Solo on Apple Records, 498 Productions (New Orleans, LA, 2005; ISBN 0-9662649-5-9).
- Gary Tillery, Working Class Mystic: A Spiritual Biography of George Harrison, Quest Books (Wheaton, IL, 2011; ISBN 978-0-8356-0900-5).
- Richard Williams, Phil Spector: Out of His Head, Omnibus Press (London, 2003 [1972]; ISBN 978-0-7119-9864-3).
