= Stabbing of George Harrison =

1999 attempted murder

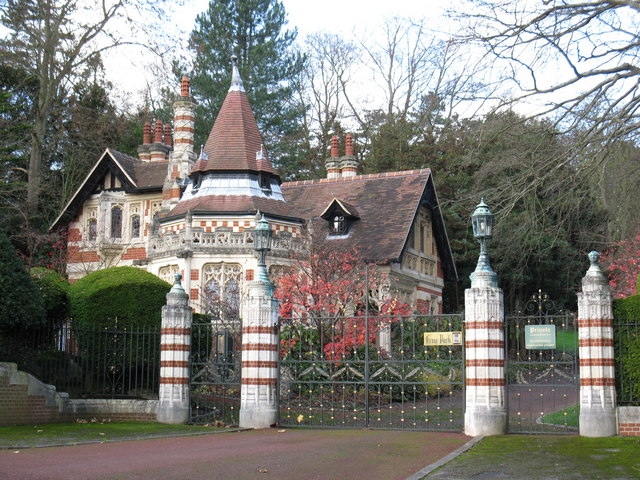
- Entrance and gatehouse of Friar Park, the Harrison family estate
- Date: 30 December 1999
- Time: c. 3.30 AM GMT
- Location: Friar Park, Oxfordshire, England
- Motive: Delusions of divinity and belief that Harrison was the Antichrist
- Perpetrator: Michael Abram
- Injuries: 3 (George wounded severely; Abram and Olivia lightly) (Note: The attack may have caused Harrison's cancer to return, which he died of in 2001.)
- Verdict: Not guilty by reason of insanity; sentenced to indefinite confinement in a psychiatric institution

On 30 December 1999, George Harrison, a musician and former member of the Beatles, was stabbed at Friar Park, his estate in Oxfordshire. The perpetrator, Michael Abram, was a 34-year old paranoid schizophrenic from Liverpool. While Harrison survived the encounter, he died of cancer on 29 November 2001, having previously conquered a first bout of the disease; those who knew him speculated that the stabbing had triggered the cancer's recurrence.

== Background ==
=== Suspect ===
Michael Abram
- Born: 1966 (age 59–60); Liverpool, Merseyside, England
- Occupation: Former telemarketer
- Known for: Attempted murder of George Harrison
- Children: 2
- Status: Released since 2002
- Criminal charge: Attempted murder
- Penalty: Indefinite confinement in a psychiatric institution

Michael Abram (born c. 1966) was from Liverpool, Merseyside, the same city as Harrison. He had been a talented student at St Columba's Comprehensive School in Huyton. He entered the telesales business sometime in the 1980s, and had a wife, Jeanette, and two children. Abram's mother, Lynda, asserted at the time that the pressures of the job had induced him to take heroin and cannabis. Following a violent argument, Abram was admitted to a mental hospital for the first time in 1990; he would be admitted several times throughout the decade and had become "desperately ill" by the end of the 1990s, by which time he had resolved to kill Harrison.

Abram had suffered from schizophrenia and delusions, believed by mental health specialists to have been worsened by drug consumption, and regarded himself as the archangel Michael and sent by God to kill Harrison.

A month before the intrusion, Abram had spent two weeks in a Merseyside psychiatric ward, but had been removed after allegedly attacking a member of the nursing staff.

=== Security at the estate ===
Harrison had become increasingly concerned about security following the murder of fellow Beatle John Lennon in 1980; local residents had equated Harrison's estate to Fort Knox. Security had already been increased following repeated death threats, a stalking incident in 1992 and a break-in attempt in 1997, resulting in searchlights and high barbed-wire fences being implemented. Additionally, guard dogs were on the property, and visitors had to be searched before access was granted.

== Attack ==
Shortly before the attack, Abram visited a local church and asked "where the squire was", referring to Harrison. The vicar did not know who he meant initially.

At around 3:30 am on 30 December 1999, Abram infiltrated Harrison's estate by scaling the walls and bypassing private security. Harrison and his wife, Olivia, were awakened by the sound of glass breaking. Olivia phoned for help while Harrison descended to the main hall, where he found Abram brandishing a knife 6 to 7 inches (15–18 cm) long. Harrison attempted to disarm Abram, chanting the "Hare Krishna" mantra to distract his assailant. Harrison suffered repeated stab wounds to his upper body, one of which punctured a lung. Olivia then entered and attacked Abram with a brass poker, drawing him away from Harrison, with an injured Harrison following to help subdue him. Olivia then threw a lamp at Abram, whereupon the police arrived and took him into custody.

Harrison was taken first to Royal Berkshire Hospital, then transferred to Harefield Hospital due to the extent of his injuries. In the hospital, Harrison received painkillers; a surgeon stated that he was "lucky to be alive". Harrison had received over 40 stab wounds, and part of his lung had to be removed. One blow narrowly missed the superior vena cava, an injury that would have almost certainly resulted in death. A spokesman for the Harrison estate reported his status as "stable but in pain". Harrison was released within two weeks and was recuperating at home by the time of Abram's trial.

=== Investigation ===
Euan Read, a chief inspector at Thames Valley Police, denied that the incident was an attempted burglary, suspecting that "the offender had come down here deliberately". Harrison also did not regard it as a burglary. Harrison released a public statement shortly afterwards, stating "Adi Shankara, an Indian historical, spiritual and groovy-type person, once said, 'Life is fragile like a raindrop on a lotus leaf.' And you'd better believe it."

== Aftermath ==
=== Abram's trial and subsequent events ===
Abram had suffered head injuries related to the attack, and was admitted to Royal Berkshire Hospital alongside Harrison. He appeared in court the day after, having been bailed by Oxford magistrates. During the trial, Abram requested to send a letter to the Harrison family. A statement was read out to the courtroom by Abram's lawyer, profusely apologising for the attack, and claiming that he was not aware he had schizophrenia. The court was also told that Abram liked to listen to music while sitting on an upturned flower pot, and his mental health had begun to deteriorate following the 1999 solar eclipse. Charged with attempted murder, Abram was found not guilty by insanity by Judge Justice Asill, though ordered indefinite confinement in a mental hospital. Harrison's son, Dhani, spoke outside of Oxford Crown Court, stating that it was "tragic that someone could suffer such a mental breakdown". Olivia was present at the court hearing, and stated: "There was blood on the walls and blood on the carpet. (...) This was the moment I realised that we were going to be murdered, and that this man was succeeding in murdering us, and there was nobody else there to help." George himself had not attended the court hearing, but provided a statement, asserting that "there was a time during this violent struggle that I truly believed I was dying". Abram had apparently offered no reaction to Harrison's vivid account.

Abram was discharged from a mental hospital in Rainhill in July 2002, eight months after Harrison's death, and placed into a hostel. Harrison's family reacted negatively to the early release, stating that they had not been informed of Abram's release beforehand, and referring to it as "upsetting and insulting". For his part, Abram insisted that he was no longer a risk and was a normal person whilst on medication.

The Liverpool Echo reported in 2005 that Abram had joined the local branch of the Citizens Advice Bureau. According to Philip Norman's 2023 biography of Harrison, Abram "was reportedly training to become a volunteer adviser for the Citizens Advice Bureau".

=== Harrison's health following the attack ===
Harrison's injuries from the Friar Park attack were more severe than was reported in the press and led to the removal of a portion of one of his lungs. Within a year, the throat cancer that he had beaten in 1998 returned in the form of lung cancer. Harrison died on 29 November 2001 at a property belonging to Paul McCartney in Beverly Hills, California, at age 58. Having seen Harrison looking so healthy beforehand, those in his social circle believed that the attack irrevocably altered his health and caused the cancer's return.

Keith Richards told Rolling Stone magazine, "I think he probably would have beaten the cancer if it wasn't for the blade [...] I mean, we know that he didn't die from [being stabbed], but I'm sure that it sort of broke down his resistance to what he had to deal with".

Harrison's Travelling Wilburys bandmate Tom Petty told Rolling Stone, "[His death is] so much easier for me than if he had died that night in the attack. I don't think I could have dealt with that. I told him so. When I put on my TV the morning he was stabbed, it looked like he had died, there were so many biographical things coming up on the TV. After that, I told him, 'I already kind of went through your death.' And I said, 'Just do me a favor and don't die that way, because I just can't handle it.' He said he promised me he wasn't going out that way".

Harrison's son Dhani said of the attack: "It definitely took years off of his life, you know. If you’re trying to fight cancer and then you’re trying to stay alive from something like that, it's gotta take it out of you."

=== Public reactions ===
McCartney issued a short statement after the attack, saying "Thank God that both George and Olivia are all right. I send them all my love."

Ringo Starr, the Beatles' drummer, provided a similar statement wishing well for Harrison and his family, and Beatles producer George Martin stated that he was "appalled" at the attack and opined about Harrison's recent reclusivity.

According to Harrison's son Dhani, George himself had reacted drily to the attack, stating that "he wasn't a burglar, and he certainly wasn't auditioning for the Traveling Wilburys."

When asked if he was impressed at the defense of George made by Harrison's wife, Tom Petty said "When I heard about it, I sent George a fax, and it just said, 'Aren't you glad you married a Mexican girl?' Olivia really kicked ass."
