= Bangla Desh (song) =

- US picture sleeve

Single by George Harrison
- B-side: "Deep Blue"
- Released: 28 July 1971
- Recorded: July 1971
- Studio: Record Plant West, Los Angeles
- Genre: Rock, gospel
- Length: 3:57
- Label: Apple
- Songwriter: George Harrison
- Producers: George Harrison, Phil Spector

George Harrison singles chronology
"What Is Life" (1971)	"Bangla Desh" (1971)	"Give Me Love (Give Me Peace on Earth)" (1973)

"Bangla Desh" is a song by English musician George Harrison. It was released as a non-album single in July 1971, to raise awareness for the millions of refugees from the country Bangladesh, formerly known as East Pakistan, following the 1970 Bhola cyclone and the outbreak of the Bangladesh Liberation War. Harrison's inspiration for the song came from his friend Ravi Shankar, an Indian-Bengali musician, who approached Harrison for help in trying to alleviate the suffering. "Bangla Desh" has been described as "one of the most cogent social statements in music history" and helped gain international support for Bangladeshi independence by establishing the name of the fledgling nation around the world. In 2005, United Nations Secretary-General Kofi Annan identified the song's success in personalising the Bangladesh crisis, through its emotive description of Shankar's request for help.

"Bangla Desh" appeared at the height of Harrison's popularity as a solo artist, following the break-up of the Beatles and the acclaim afforded his 1970 triple album All Things Must Pass. It was pop music's first charity single, and its release took place three days before the Harrison-sponsored Concert for Bangladesh shows at New York's Madison Square Garden. The single became a top ten hit in the United Kingdom and elsewhere in Europe, and peaked at number 23 on America's Billboard Hot 100. The recording was co-produced by Phil Spector and features contributions from Leon Russell, Jim Horn, Ringo Starr and Jim Keltner. The Los Angeles session for the song marked the start of two enduring musical associations in Harrison's solo career, with Keltner and Horn.

Backed by these musicians and others including Eric Clapton and Billy Preston, Harrison performed "Bangla Desh" at the UNICEF concerts, on 1 August 1971, as a rousing encore. In a review of the Concert for Bangladesh live album for Rolling Stone magazine, Jon Landau identified this reading as "the concert's single greatest performance by all concerned". The studio recording appeared on the 1976 compilation The Best of George Harrison, which remained its only official CD release until September 2014, when it was included as a bonus track on the Apple Years 1968–75 reissue of Harrison's Living in the Material World album. Artists who have covered the song include Stu Phillips & the Hollyridge Strings and Italian saxophonist Fausto Papetti.

== Background ==
The flag adopted by the newly declared nation of Bangladesh in 1971

By the spring of 1971, George Harrison had established himself as the most successful ex-Beatle during the former band members' first year as solo artists; in the words of biographer Elliot Huntley, he "couldn't have got any more popular in the eyes of the public". Just as importantly, writes Peter Lavezzoli, author of The Dawn of Indian Music in the West, Harrison had "amassed such good will in the music community" during that time. Rather than looking to immediately follow up his All Things Must Pass triple album, he had spent the months since recording ended in October 1970 repaying favours to the friends and musicians who had helped make the album such a success. These included co-producer Phil Spector, whose wife, Ronnie Spector, Harrison supplied with songs for a proposed solo album on Apple Records; Ringo Starr, whose "It Don't Come Easy" single he produced and prepared for release, following the original session for the song in March 1970; Bobby Whitlock, singer and keyboard player with the short-lived Derek and the Dominos, whose eponymous debut solo album featured Harrison and Eric Clapton on guitar; and former Spooky Tooth pianist Gary Wright, whose Footprint album (1971) Harrison also guested on, along with All Things Must Pass orchestrator John Barham.

Another project was a documentary on the life and music of Ravi Shankar, Howard Worth's Raga (1971), for which Harrison had stepped in at the last minute to provide funding and distribution through Apple Films. With Harrison also serving as record producer for the accompanying soundtrack album, work began with Shankar in Los Angeles during April 1971 and resumed in late June, following Harrison-produced sessions in London for the band Badfinger.

A Bengali by birth, Shankar had already brought the growing humanitarian crisis in Bangladesh to Harrison's attention, while staying at the ex-Beatle's house, Friar Park, earlier in the year. The state formerly known as East Pakistan (and before that, East Bengal) had suffered an estimated 300,000 casualties when the Bhola cyclone hit its shores on 12 November 1970, and the indifference shown by the ruling government in West Pakistan, particularly by President Yahya Khan, was just one reason the Bengali national movement sought independence on 25 March 1971. This declaration resulted in an immediate military crackdown by Khan's troops, and three days later the Bangladesh Liberation War began. By 13 June, details of the systematic massacre of citizens were beginning to emerge internationally via the publication in London's Sunday Times of an article by Anthony Mascarenhas. Along with the torrential rains and intensive flooding that were threatening the passage of millions of refugees into north-eastern India, this news galvanised Shankar into approaching Harrison for help in trying to alleviate the suffering. "I was in a very sad mood, having read all this news," Shankar later told Rolling Stone magazine, "and I said, 'George, this is the situation, I know it doesn't concern you, I know you can't possibly identify.' But while I talked to George he was very deeply moved ... and he said, 'Yes, I think I'll be able to do something.'"

As a result, Harrison committed to staging the Concert for Bangladesh at Madison Square Garden, New York, on Sunday, 1 August. Six weeks of frantic activity ensued as Harrison flew between New York, Los Angeles and London, making preparations and recruiting other musicians to join him and Shankar for the shows. While conceding that Harrison was no "natural sloganeer" in the manner of his former bandmate John Lennon, author Robert Rodriguez has written: "if any ex-Fab had the cachet with his fan base to solicit good works, it was the spiritual Beatle."

== Writing ==
I got tired of people saying "But what can I do?" Also, the reluctance of the press to report the full details created the need to bring attention to it. So the song "Bangla Desh" was written specifically to get attention to the war prior to the concert.

— George Harrison, 1979

Foreign journalists had been deported from East Pakistan shortly before the Pakistani army's Operation Searchlight, and even after Mascarenhas' first-hand observations had been published, Shankar and Harrison were concerned that the mainstream media in the West were showing a reluctance to report all the facts. That summer, it also emerged that America was supporting General Khan's military offensive, both financially and with weaponry – despite the Blood telegram in April, in which officials at the US Consulate in Dacca advised their State Department of the "genocide" taking place and accused the US Government of "moral bankruptcy". Realising the need to create greater awareness of the situation in Bangladesh, and particularly the refugee camps of India that had become "infectious open-air graveyards" with the outbreak of cholera, Harrison quickly composed a song for the cause. He later said that "Bangla Desh" was "written in ten minutes at the piano". The title translates as "Bengal nation", and the fact that Harrison spelt it as two words is indicative of how little the new country name had been acknowledged by the Western media at this time.

As with the concerts, Harrison made a point of steering clear of the politics behind the problem, his lyrics focusing instead on the human perspective. At the suggestion of Leon Russell, who had participated in the recent Ronnie Spector and Badfinger sessions, Harrison began the song with a verse outlining his own introduction to the Bangladesh crisis:

My friend came to me with sadness in his eyes
Told me that he wanted help before his country dies
Although I couldn't feel the pain, I knew I had to try
Now I'm asking all of you to help us save some lives.

These lines refer to Shankar's request for help. Author Simon Leng writes that "[in] deference to the Shankar context", Harrison set the opening verse as a rock version of Indian music's traditional alap – "a slow introductory statement of the main ideas". The remainder of the song's lyrics concentrate on the uncompromising message "We've got to relieve Bangla Desh" as thousands of refugees, particularly children, fell victim to the effects of famine and disease.

The final verse-chorus, which includes the lines "Now, it may seem so far from where we all are / It's something we can't reject", reflects a point that former US Fund for UNICEF president Charles Lyons later identified as a perennial obstacle when addressing global issues of poverty: that the problems appear to be too big and too distant for individuals to be able to solve. Author Ian Inglis comments that the line "Now won't you give some bread to get the starving fed" contains a "clever pun", whereby the word "bread" is used to refer to both money and food.

== Recording ==
With little time to begin rehearsing for the New York shows, the "Bangla Desh" single was rush-recorded in Los Angeles. Sources differ over the venue and date: the Record Plant West seems the most likely studio, with sessions taking place on 4–5 July and horn overdubs perhaps on 10 July. Phil Spector again co-produced with Harrison. As with the recording details for the sessions, the exact line-up of musicians is a matter of conjecture. According to Simon Leng, the line-up comprised Harrison, Leon Russell (piano), Jim Horn (saxophones), Klaus Voormann (bass), Starr, Jim Keltner (both on drums) and Billy Preston (organ). Horn's recollection is that only Harrison, Russell, Voormann and Keltner were present at the first session. (Note: Starr was in Spain filming his role in the Western Blindman in July. The director agreed to halt production to allow Starr to participate in Harrison's relief project.) Leng and Beatles historian Bruce Spizer credit a "horn section" led by Jim Horn. The latter went on to lead the six-piece "Hollywood Horns", which included trumpeter and trombonist Chuck Findley, at the New York concerts on 1 August.

The recording begins with Harrison's emotive introduction backed by what Lavezzoli describes as a "rolling piano figure" from Russell. Following the words "help us save some lives", the piano sets up the song's "driving groove", Lavezzoli continues, as the rhythm section and Harrison's electric guitar join in, creating the same musical blend of gospel and rock that Harrison had adopted on much of All Things Must Pass. In a review for the NME in August 1971, Derek Johnson wrote of "Bangla Desh": "Opens almost like a sermon, then the beat come is ... as George wails fervently to a backing of a solid rhythm section and handclaps." The track retains an "urgent 'live' mood", according to Leng, and features solos shared between Russell, Horn (on tenor sax) and Harrison (slide guitar). It fades out with the ensemble playing in double time, similar to a fast gat section (or drut) used in Hindustani classical music. In journalist Richard Williams' description: "[Harrison] put a lot of feeling into the record. His voice takes on unusually sad inflections – at times he is almost unrecognisable – and Spector backed him well with leaping riffs supported by a grunting baritone sax."

"Bangla Desh" marked the first occasion that Harrison worked with Horn, who would go on to become a regular collaborator. (Note: Later examples of Harrison and Horn's work together include "Living in the Material World", "You", "Got My Mind Set on You" and the Traveling Wilburys' "Heading for the Light" and "Wilbury Twist".) Already a veteran of the LA music scene by 1971, Horn recalls his "jaded" mindset before meeting Harrison, but describes the session as a "real turning point" in his career, "because we were doing something for a cause". It was also the first time that Keltner played on a Harrison session, the two musicians having recently worked together on Lennon's Imagine album. The "Bangla Desh" session was the beginning of a lifelong friendship, with the pair remaining "as brothers", Keltner has said, until Harrison's death in 2001. Together with Clapton, Preston, Bob Dylan and the group Badfinger, all these musicians joined Harrison and Shankar on stage at Madison Square Garden.

Ravi Shankar cut a benefit record of his own at this time, the Harrison-produced Joi Bangla EP. The A-side contained two vocal compositions sung in Bengali – the title track (which translated to mean "Victory to Bangladesh") and "Oh Bhaugowan" – while on the reverse was a six-minute recital of "Raga Mishra Jhinjoti", featuring Shankar, sarodya Ali Akbar Khan, and Shankar's regular tabla player, Alla Rakha.

== Release ==
The reverse of the US picture sleeve for "Bangla Desh": a confronting UPI image that was also used in print advertisements for the single.

At Harrison's urging, Capitol Records, Apple's distributor in the United States, set all four of its manufacturing plants to producing copies of the "Bangla Desh" single; one-sided, white label promo discs were also rushed through to ensure immediate radio play for the song. For the US picture sleeve, designer Tom Wilkes chose a suitably topical image, incorporating headlines and text from New York Times articles about the Bangladesh crisis. The articles made mention of vultures being the "happiest creatures" amid the chaos in Dacca, and India's "wait and see" policy regarding events in East Pakistan. (Note: Anthony Mascarenhas' exposé directly altered India's position, Prime Minister Indira Gandhi later admitted, leading to Indian troops finally entering the fray on 4 December.) The front of the picture sleeve was topped with the line "(We've Got to Relieve)" before the words "Bangla Desh", leading a number of publications to include the parenthetical text as part of the official song title. Boxed off at the foot of the front sleeve were details of the George Harrison–Ravi Shankar Special Emergency Relief Fund (care of UNICEF's New York headquarters), to which proceeds of the single would go and further donations were encouraged. The back cover of the US sleeve was taken from a UPI news agency photograph – an "emotional" image showing a mother comforting her starving child. This photo was also used in the aid project's magazine advertising campaign.

Backed by "Deep Blue", the "Bangla Desh" single was issued on 28 July 1971 in the United States (as Apple 1836), with a UK release following two days later (R 5912). It peaked at number 10 on Britain's national singles chart and number 23 on the Billboard Hot 100 in America; the other US chart compilers, Cash Box and Record World, placed the single at number 20 and number 13, respectively. "Bangla Desh" attracted sustained airplay in the days leading up to the concerts, and lent the relief project an authentic social and political significance. A Bangladeshi academic, Professor Farida Majid, would later write: "To the utter consternation of [US President] Nixon and [Secretary of State] Kissinger, George Harrison's 'Bangla Desh' hit the chart. It was a thrilling moment in the midst of all the sad news emanating from the battlefront. Even the Western journalists covering the civil war in East Pakistan were not yet using the word 'Bangladesh'." The studio recording was also played at the Concert for Bangladesh shows, following Shankar's opening set, over footage of the refugees and scenes from the war.

=== Reissue ===
Despite the song having been a hit – and its status as the first-ever pop charity single, fourteen years before Band Aid and USA for Africa – "Bangla Desh" was mostly ignored by record-company repackagers following 1971. Over a period of 43 years, the studio version received an album release only on the 1976 compilation The Best of George Harrison, which was issued on CD in 1987. (Note: The 2005 re-release of the Concert for Bangladesh album contained Harrison's live version of "Bangla Desh", and the remastered studio recording was belatedly included with this reissue, but only as an iTunes-exclusive download in July 2011.) The song has since been included as a bonus track, remixed by Paul Hicks, on the 2014 reissue of Harrison's Living in the Material World album, part of the eight-disc Apple Years 1968–75 box set.

== Reception and legacy ==
On release, Billboard magazine described "Bangla Desh" as "a musical appeal to help our fellow-man" that "should find immediate and heavy chart action". In his contemporary review for the NME, Derek Johnson considered the song to be "[n]ot so strong melodically as 'My Sweet Lord', but still nagging and insistent", and added: "one can immediately detect the despair and pity in [Harrison's] voice as he sings of the appalling plight of the East Pakistanis ... his lyric is bound to cause some heart-searching." Record World called it a "beautiful record." A wave of public goodwill accompanied the single's release in 1971, as was the case with the two benefit concerts, the subsequent live album, and the 1972 concert film. Simon Leng has identified genuine friendship as being key to the success of Harrison and Shankar's relief project: the friendship between the two of them that saw the ex-Beatle become involved, and the friendships Harrison had cultivated with Dylan, Clapton and Starr that ensured their participation. Leng notes that the opening lyrics to "Bangla Desh" ("My friend came to me ...") could equally have applied to Harrison's efforts to enlist the reluctant Dylan and heroin-sidelined Clapton.

In his concert review for The Village Voice, Don Heckman described "Bangla Desh" as "a song which expresses far better than words what kind of man Harrison is". Heckman went on to compare Harrison's philanthropy with the activities of two of his former bandmates, saying: "I have no quarrel with John Lennon's endless clattering around inside his psyche, or Paul McCartney's search for sweetness and light, but at the moment I have to have stronger feelings about George Harrison's active efforts to do something about the misery in the world around him. How surprising that the most introspective of the Beatles should be the one who, in the long run, takes the most effective actions."

Even now I still meet waiters in Bengali restaurants who say, "When we were in the jungle fighting, it was great to know somebody out there was thinking of us."

— George Harrison, 1991

Away from its context as a song designed purely to bring attention to the Bengalis' cause, as Harrison himself described it, "Bangla Desh" has often been viewed by commentators as a rushed and underwhelming composition. Robert Rodriguez qualifies this opinion, however: "As a single, the song was possibly not the most commercial of records, but as a call to service, it could scarcely have been improved upon." "Bangla Desh"'s standing as rock music's first charity single is not overlooked, with Ian Inglis stating: "'Bangla Desh' serves as a model for the charity singles that would become commonplace in the decades ahead, although, in this instance, the power of Harrison's song lies not in its assembly of famous performers but in its literal and absolute commitment." On this point, Leng deems the song as having "as much raw energy as anything [Lennon's] Plastic Ono Band ever offered". In The Dawn of Indian Music in the West, Peter Lavezzoli writes: "Harrison's lyric and vocal were concise and powerful, a direct call for action in a specific crisis. As such, 'Bangla Desh' remains one of the most cogent social statements in music history."

In his interview for the 2005 reissue of Saul Swimmer's Concert for Bangladesh film, UN Secretary-General Kofi Annan acknowledged Harrison and Shankar as "pioneers" in their efforts for the people of Bangladesh, and credited the song's opening verse for personalising the crisis by showing "the man behind the music". Thirty-three years before this, on 5 June 1972, UNICEF officially recognised Harrison and Shankar with its annual Child Is the Father of the Man award.

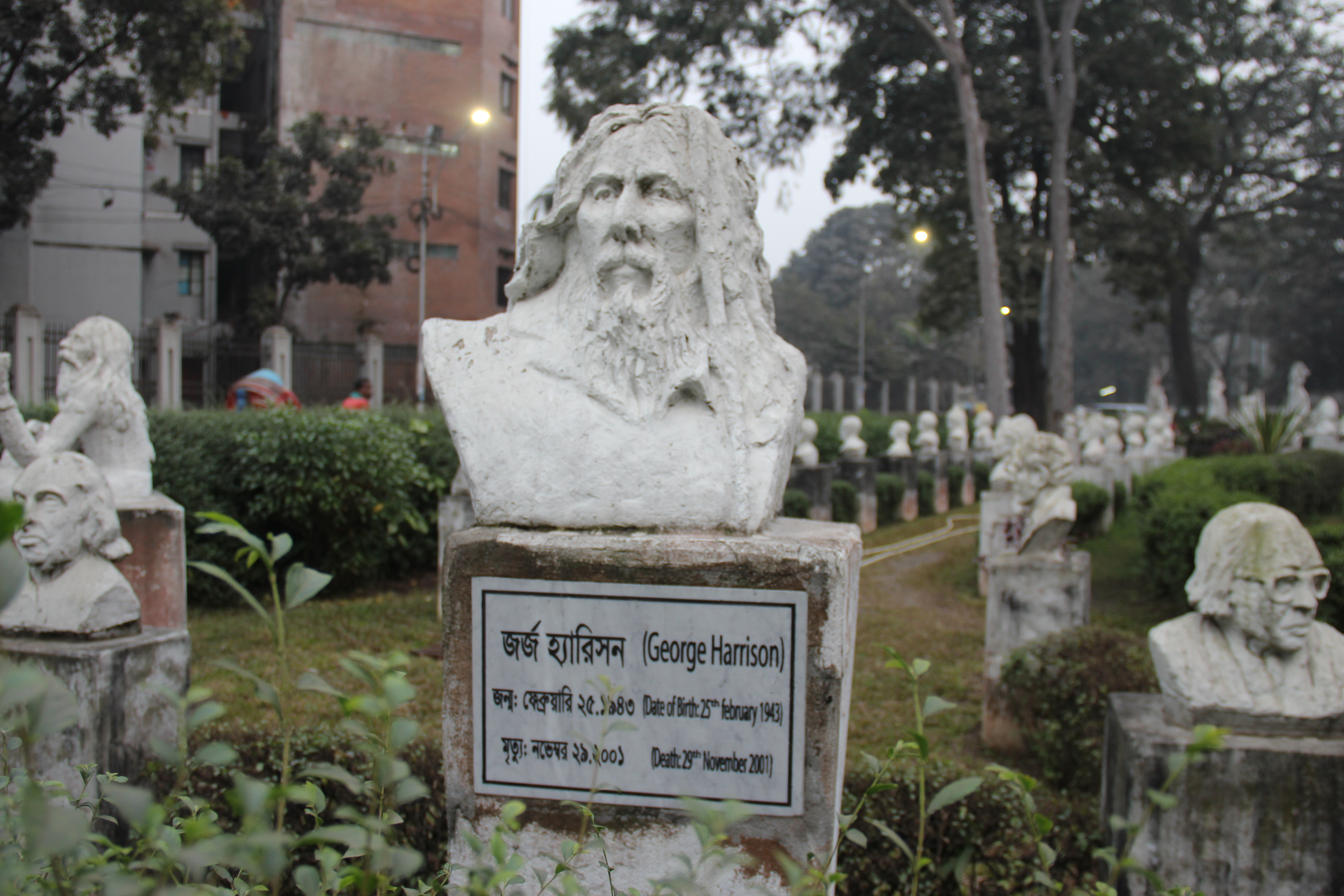
George Harrison sculpture in Dhaka, Bangladesh

In 2004, "Bangla Desh" was played during the final episode of the BBC television series Himalaya with Michael Palin, in which Palin travels south from Bhutan to Bay of Bengal and reflects on Bangladesh's struggle for independence. Writing for Blender magazine in April that year, Paul Du Noyer described the song as a "fine 1971 single". In the 2005 "Beatles Solo" edition of NME Originals, Adrian Thrills rated "Bangla Desh" second among Harrison's "ten solo gems" (behind "What Is Life"), referring to it as a "jazz-blues-rock shuffle" that "set the template for Band Aid". Writing in The Cambridge Companion to the Beatles in 2009, Michael Frontani said that with his Bangladesh relief effort, Harrison "pioneered the whole idea of the charity album and single, as well as of the rock concert fundraiser". While bemoaning the song's omission from the 2009 Harrison compilation Let It Roll, Jon Cummings of Popdose described "Bangla Desh" as "no great artistic achievement" within itself, but "a key moment ... in the evolution of pop-music activism".

The song is featured in Bruce Pollock's 2005 book The 7,500 Most Important Songs of 1944–2000. In 2010, AOL Radio listeners placed "Bangla Desh" at number 10 in a poll to decide the ten best post-Beatles Harrison songs.

== Live version ==
Harrison played "Bangla Desh" as an encore at both of the Madison Square Garden shows on 1 August 1971, with the evening performance being selected for inclusion on the Concert for Bangladesh triple live album. After the familiar introduction to the song, the band "threw their full weight behind Harrison", Lavezzoli writes, "playing the darkest and heaviest music of the show". On release that December, Jon Landau of Rolling Stone identified the song as "the concert's single greatest performance by all concerned", and added that by the close of the show, the lyrics to Harrison's single were "no longer an expression of intent but of an accomplished mission – help has been given, people have been reached, an effort has been made and results will be felt".

In his album review for Melody Maker, Richard Williams wrote that the live version of "Bangla Desh" "roars and rages to a stunning close". Played at a faster tempo than the studio recording, it features what Spizer terms a "blistering" saxophone solo from Horn, and a vocal by Harrison that Leng describes as "astonishingly powerful" and "a pure act of zeal". As shown in the concert film, following his brief guitar solo towards the end of the song, Harrison repeats the line "Relieve the people of Bangla Desh" before exiting the stage to loud applause, as the band play on without him. (Note: According to a report in Billboard, the reason for Harrison's departure before the end of the song was that members of the audience had started to "rush the stage and grab for the musicians".) In his book on the Beatles' first decade as solo artists, Rodriguez views this live performance as perhaps Harrison's "high water mark of public esteem". Pitchfork's Quinn Moreland writes that the song title was the phrase that Harrison "hopes his audience takes away from the [concert]", and he adds:

Concise, direct, and with a killer saxophone solo, "Bangla Desh" makes a convincing argument: Yes, the '60s were done. The Manson murders terrified a nation, Altamont crashed and burned, Joplin and Hendrix were dead, and the Vietnam War raged on. Fear and doubt had poisoned the well of idealism. But right here, right now, Harrison suggests, you can honor some of the decade's lost promises by lending a hand to help a fellow man.

Although he was reportedly eager to repeat the experience of these New York shows, Harrison never played "Bangla Desh" in concert after 1971 and he did not perform live again until his 1974 North American tour with Shankar. By that point, the Bangladesh Liberation War had long ended, with the defeat of the Pakistani army in December 1971 by the allied forces of Bangladesh and India, but Bangladesh was now experiencing a devastating famine that would account for up to 1.5 million lives. During a concert in Los Angeles on 11 November, Harrison responded to requests for the song "Bangla Desh" with a suggestion that the audience instead chant "Krishna, Krishna, Krishna" and use the positive power of mantra to help the Bangladeshi population.

== Cover versions ==
Harrison biographer Alan Clayson has written of the "triumph" of the Bangladesh concerts leading to a host of imitators and tribute acts replicating the shows' programme, among which was a French band's cover version of "Bangla Desh". Another example was the Tribe's Bangla Desh (1972), a full album of highlights from the concerts, including Harrison's "Something", "My Sweet Lord" and "Here Comes the Sun". The previous year, Stu Phillips & the Hollyridge Strings released an easy listening version of "Bangla Desh" on their Beatles tribute album The George, John, Paul & Ringo Songbook (1971). Another 1971 cover version, re-released in 2002 on the compilation When They Was Fab – A Tribute to the Solo Beatles, was recorded by the Top of the Poppers.

Following Jim Horn's prominent contribution to the original Harrison recording, Italian saxophonist Fausto Papetti recorded the song for his 1972 album 14a Raccolta. Alternative band B.A.L.L. covered "Bangla Desh" on their 1988 album Bird, as part of their parody of early 1970s rock stars such as the former Beatles.

== Personnel ==
The following musicians are believed to have played on the studio recording of "Bangla Desh".

- George Harrison – vocals, electric guitar, slide guitar, backing vocals
- Leon Russell – piano
- Billy Preston – organ
- Klaus Voormann – bass
- Ringo Starr – drums
- Jim Keltner – drums
- Jim Horn – tenor saxophone, baritone saxophone, horn arrangement

== Chart performance ==
Chart (1971)	Peak position
Australian Go-Set National Top 40	15
Belgian Ultratop Singles Chart	21
Canadian RPM 100 Singles	13
Dutch MegaChart Singles	7
Irish Singles Chart	18
Japanese Oricon Singles Chart	47
Norwegian VG-lista Singles	3
Polish Music Clubs' Co-Ordination Council Chart	2
Swedish Kvällstoppen Chart	8
Swiss Singles Chart	2
UK Melody Maker Pop 30 Singles	13
UK Singles Chart	10
US Billboard Hot 100	23
US Cash Box Top 100	20
US Record World Singles Chart	13
West German Media Control Singles Chart	23

== Sources ==
- Mohiuddin Alagmir, Famine in South Asia: Political Economy of Mass Starvation, Oelgeschlager, Gunn & Hain (Cambridge, MA, 1980; ISBN 0-89946-042-9).
- Keith Badman, The Beatles Diary Volume 2: After the Break-Up 1970–2001, Omnibus Press (London, 2001; ISBN 0-7119-8307-0).
- Roy Carr & Tony Tyler, The Beatles: An Illustrated Record, Trewin Copplestone Publishing (London, 1978; ISBN 0-450-04170-0).
- Harry Castleman & Walter J. Podrazik, All Together Now: The First Complete Beatles Discography 1961–1975, Ballantine Books (New York, NY, 1976; ISBN 0-345-25680-8).
- Alan Clayson, George Harrison, Sanctuary (London, 2003; ISBN 1-86074-489-3).
- The Concert for Bangladesh Revisited with George Harrison and Friends DVD, Apple Corps, 2005 (directed by Claire Ferguson; produced by Olivia Harrison, Jonathan Clyde & Jo Human).
- The Editors of Rolling Stone, Harrison, Rolling Stone Press/Simon & Schuster (New York, NY, 2002; ISBN 0-7432-3581-9).
- Michael Frontani, "The Solo Years", in Kenneth Womack (ed.), The Cambridge Companion to the Beatles, Cambridge University Press (Cambridge, UK, 2009; ISBN 978-1-139-82806-2), pp. 153–82.
- Joshua M. Greene, Here Comes the Sun: The Spiritual and Musical Journey of George Harrison, John Wiley & Sons (Hoboken, NJ, 2006; ISBN 978-0-470-12780-3).
- John Harris, "A Quiet Storm", Mojo, July 2001, pp. 66–74.
- George Harrison, I Me Mine, Chronicle Books (San Francisco, CA, 2002; ISBN 0-8118-3793-9).
- Olivia Harrison, George Harrison: Living in the Material World, Abrams (New York, NY, 2011; ISBN 978-1-4197-0220-4).
- Chris Hunt (ed.), NME Originals: Beatles – The Solo Years 1970–1980, IPC Ignite! (London, 2005).
- Elliot J. Huntley, Mystical One: George Harrison – After the Break-up of the Beatles, Guernica Editions (Toronto, ON, 2006; ISBN 1-55071-197-0).
- Ian Inglis, The Words and Music of George Harrison, Praeger (Santa Barbara, CA, 2010; ISBN 978-0-313-37532-3).
- Peter Lavezzoli, The Dawn of Indian Music in the West, Continuum (New York, NY, 2006; ISBN 0-8264-2819-3).
- Simon Leng, While My Guitar Gently Weeps: The Music of George Harrison, Hal Leonard (Milwaukee, WI, 2006; ISBN 1-4234-0609-5).
- Ian MacDonald, Revolution in the Head: The Beatles' Records and the Sixties, Pimlico (London, 1998; ISBN 0-7126-6697-4).
- Chip Madinger & Mark Easter, Eight Arms to Hold You: The Solo Beatles Compendium, 44.1 Productions (Chesterfield, MO, 2000; ISBN 0-615-11724-4).
- Robert Rodriguez, Fab Four FAQ 2.0: The Beatles' Solo Years, 1970–1980, Backbeat Books (Milwaukee, WI, 2010; ISBN 978-1-4165-9093-4).
- Nicholas Schaffner, The Beatles Forever, McGraw-Hill (New York, NY, 1978; ISBN 0-07-055087-5).
- Ravi Shankar, Raga Mala: The Autobiography of Ravi Shankar, Welcome Rain (New York, NY, 1999; ISBN 1-56649-104-5).
- Mat Snow, "George Harrison", Mojo, November 2014, pp. 66–73.
- Bruce Spizer, The Beatles Solo on Apple Records, 498 Productions (New Orleans, LA, 2005; ISBN 0-9662649-5-9).
- Richard Williams, Phil Spector: Out of His Head, Omnibus Press (London, 2003 [1972]; ISBN 978-0-7119-9864-3).
