= Hollyridge Strings =

The Hollyridge Strings was an American studio orchestra that specialized in easy-listening music, and recorded for the Capitol Records label in the 1960s and 1970s. Stu Phillips, Mort Garson, and Perry Botkin, Jr. were among those who produced, arranged, and conducted the group's recordings.

The group specialized in orchestral versions of songs by such then-contemporary pop-music artists as The Beatles, The Beach Boys, The Four Seasons, Elvis Presley, Simon & Garfunkel, and Nat "King" Cole.

During the week of July 4, 1964, the group's cover version of The Beatles's song "All My Loving" spent a single week on the Billboard Hot 100 chart at No. 93.
