= William Shaw (writer) =

British writer and music journalist

William Shaw works as a journalist and writer in the US and in the UK. One of his earlier works is the 1999 book Westsiders: Stories of the Boys in the Hood, which chronicles the attempts of a group of Los Angelenos to become successful hip hop artists.

Shaw's police novel Salt Lane (May 2018) is the first in a new series which features DS Alexandra Cupidi. The novel The Birdwatcher (2016) is set before the events of this book.

William Shaw lives in Brighton, United Kingdom.

== Bibliography ==
Non-fiction

- Travellers (1994)
- Spying in Guru Land: Inside Britain's Cults (1995)
- Westsiders: Stories of the Boys in the Hood (1999)
- A Superhero for Hire: True Stories from the Small Ads (2005)
- 41 Places – 41 Stories (2007)

DS Cathal Breen and WPC Helen Tozer

- A Song from Dead Lips [US title: She's Leaving Home] (2013)
- A House of Knives [US title: The Kings of London] (2014)
- A Book of Scars [US title: A Song for the Brokenhearted] (2015)
- Sympathy for the Devil [US title: Play with Fire] (2017)

Standalone Novel featuring DS Cupidi

- The Birdwatcher (2016)

DS Alex Cupidi

- Salt Lane (2018)
- Deadland (2019)
- Grave's End (2020)
- The Trawlerman (2021)
- The Wild Swimmers (2024)

Writing as GW Shaw

- Dead Rich (2022)
- The Conspirators (2023)
