= Al Aronowitz =

American rock journalist (1928–2005)

Alfred Gilbert Aronowitz
- Born: May 20, 1928; Bordentown, New Jersey, U.S.
- Died: August 1, 2005 (aged 77); Elizabeth, New Jersey, U.S.
- Occupation: Rock journalist

Alfred Gilbert Aronowitz (May 20, 1928 – August 1, 2005) was an American rock journalist best known for introducing Bob Dylan to the Beatles in 1964.

== Early life and education ==
Aronowitz was born in Bordentown, New Jersey, south-east of Trenton and earned a degree in journalism from Rutgers University in 1950. He was the son of an Orthodox Jewish butcher.

== Career ==
He worked for various New Jersey newspapers in the 1950s before moving to the New York Post where, in 1959, he wrote a 12-part series on the Beat Generation, in the process becoming friends with Allen Ginsberg and Jack Kerouac. In the early 1960s, Aronowitz wrote for the Saturday Evening Post. While covering the Beatles, he introduced them to Bob Dylan in a New York City hotel room on August 28, 1964. According to Aronowitz's own journal entries, he also introduced the Beatles to marijuana at the meeting.

Aronowitz claimed that Dylan wrote the song "Mr. Tambourine Man" while staying in Aronowitz's Berkeley Heights, New Jersey, home west of Newark.

Aronowitz was the original manager of The Velvet Underground, getting the band their first gig in the auditorium of the high school in Summit, New Jersey next to Berkeley Heights. The Velvet Underground stole Aronowitz's tape recorder and dumped him as manager weeks later when they met the artist Andy Warhol. Beginning in the late 1960s, Aronowitz wrote the Pop Scene column for the New York Post; he was fired in 1972 for conflict of interest because he managed bands.

== Publications ==
Aronowitz self-published two books, Bob Dylan and the Beatles and Bobby Darin Was a Friend of Mine. A third book, Mick and Miles, about Mick Jagger and Miles Davis, was not completed. Aronowitz had a website, The Blacklisted Journalist.

== Personal life and death ==
Aronowitz's wife, Ann, died in 1972. The couple had two sons and a daughter. Their son, Myles, is a photographer, who often works as still photographer on feature film productions. Their daughter, Brett, is a graphic designer, writer and illustrator.

Aronowitz died of cancer in Elizabeth, New Jersey, on August 1, 2005, at the age of 77.
