= George Harrison discography =

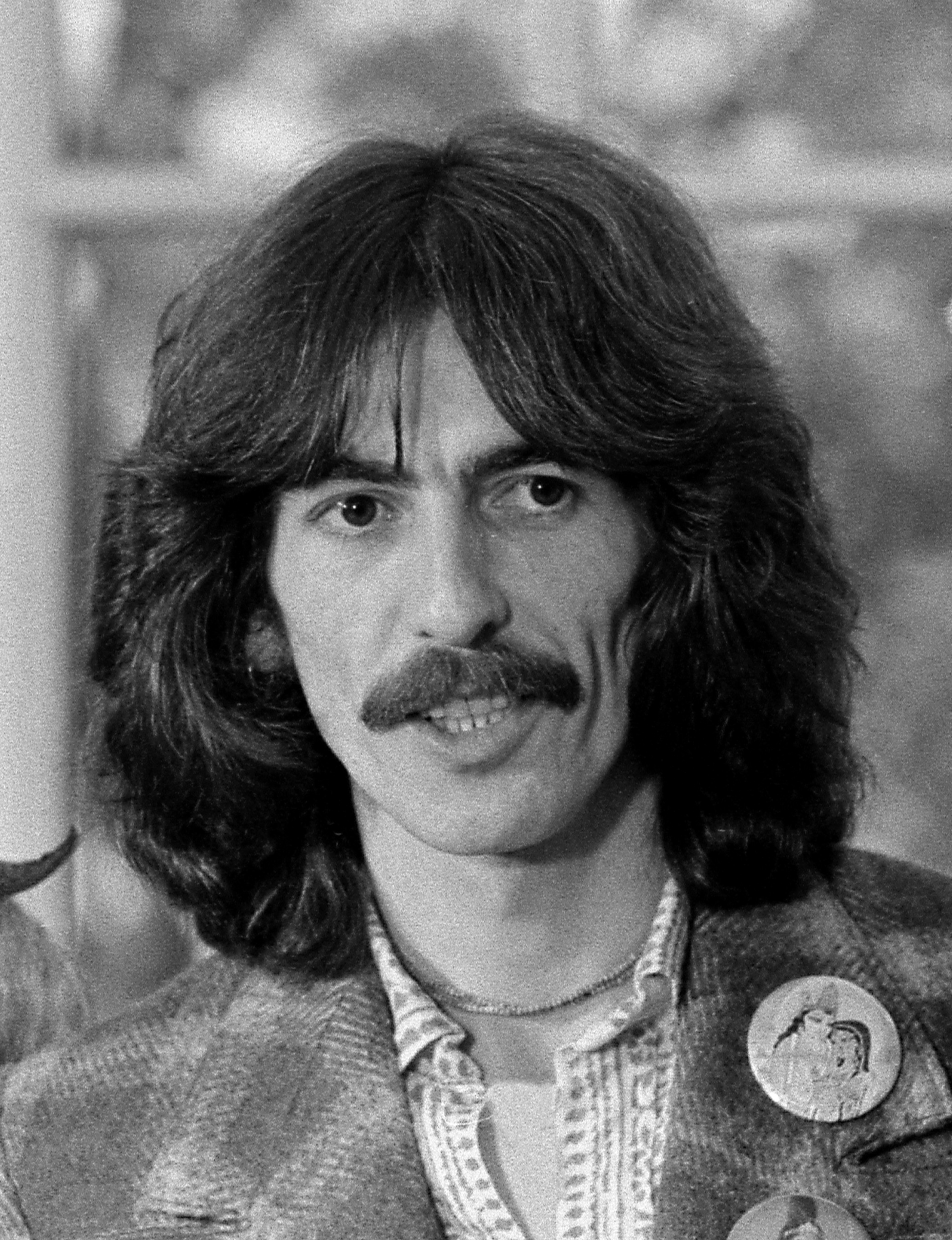
- Studio albums: 12
- Live albums: 2
- Compilation albums: 4
- Singles: 35
- Video albums: 2
- Music videos: 18
- Box sets: 4

The discography of English singer-songwriter and former Beatle George Harrison consists of 12 studio albums, two live albums, four compilation albums, 35 singles, two video albums and four box sets (one of which is with Indian classical musician Ravi Shankar). Harrison's first solo releases – the Wonderwall Music film soundtrack (1968) and Electronic Sound (1969) – were almost entirely instrumental works, issued during the last two years of the Beatles' career. Following the band's break-up in April 1970, Harrison continued to produce recordings by his fellow Apple Records acts, notably former bandmate Ringo Starr. He recorded and collaborated with a wide range of artists, including Shankar, Bob Dylan, Eric Clapton and Gary Wright.

Harrison's acclaimed triple album All Things Must Pass (1970) was certified six-times platinum by the Recording Industry Association of America (RIAA) in March 2001 and, as of 2011, was still the most successful album by an ex-Beatle. All Things Must Pass produced the international number 1 hit "My Sweet Lord", which was coupled as a double A-side with "Isn't It a Pity" in the majority of countries. In 1971 Harrison recorded pop music's first charity single, "Bangla Desh", and released the Concert for Bangladesh triple live album (credited to George Harrison & Friends) to raise further funds for refugees of the Bangladesh Liberation War. His 1973 album Living in the Material World and the single "Give Me Love (Give Me Peace on Earth)" repeated the US success of his 1970 solo releases by simultaneously holding the number 1 position on Billboard's albums and singles charts. The remainder of his 1970s studio albums, starting with Dark Horse (1974), were all certified gold by the RIAA but performed disappointingly on the UK albums chart. Following the expiration of his EMI-affiliated Apple contract, Thirty Three & 1/3 (1976) was Harrison's debut release on his Dark Horse label, distributed worldwide by Warner Bros. Records.

The 1981 single "All Those Years Ago", from Somewhere in England, was written as a tribute to the recently murdered John Lennon and became Harrison's biggest chart hit since "Give Me Love". Having clashed with Warner Bros. over the content of that album, Harrison refused to participate in promotion for Gone Troppo (1982), resulting in lacklustre sales. From 1983 until 1986, Harrison released only film soundtrack singles, reflecting his involvement in movie production. Cloud Nine (1987) and its lead single "Got My Mind Set on You" marked a commercial comeback for Harrison. He then formed the Traveling Wilburys with Dylan, Jeff Lynne, Tom Petty and Roy Orbison, and the band released two successful studio albums between 1988 and 1990 on his Warner Bros. contract. Following his tour that resulted in the 1992 Live in Japan album, Harrison again stepped back from full-time musical activity. After being diagnosed with throat cancer in 1997, he recorded his twelfth and final studio album, the posthumously released Brainwashed (2002). Harrison oversaw the reissue of All Things Must Pass in January 2001, and 2014 saw the completion of his remastered catalogue with the release of The Apple Years 1968–75.

== Albums ==
=== Studio albums ===
List of studio albums, with selected chart positions and certifications
Title	Album details	Peak chart positions										Certifications
Title	Album details	UK	AUS	AUT	CAN	GER	JPN	NL	NOR	SWE	US	Certifications
Wonderwall Music	Label: Apple/EMI; Released: 1 November 1968 (UK); Released: 2 December 1968 (US)	—	—	—	30	22	—	—	—	—	49	
Electronic Sound	Label: Zapple/EMI; Released: 9 May 1969 (UK); Released: 26 May 1969 (US)	—	—	—	—	—	—	—	—	—	191	
All Things Must Pass	Label: Apple/EMI; Released: 27 November 1970 (US); Released: 30 November 1970 (UK)	1	1	4	1	2	4	1	1	1	1	RIAA: 7× Platinum; BPI: Gold; MC: Gold
Living in the Material World	Label: Apple/EMI; Released: 30 May 1973 (US); Released: 22 June 1973 (UK)	2	2	—	1	12	9	5	2	2	1	RIAA: Gold
Dark Horse	Label: Apple/EMI; Released: 9 December 1974 (US); Released: 20 December 1974 (UK)	—	47	10	42	45	18	5	7	—	4	BPI: Silver; RIAA: Gold
Extra Texture (Read All About It)	Label: Apple/EMI; Released: 22 September 1975 (US); Released: 3 October 1975 (UK)	16	36	—	63	—	9	—	8	—	8	RIAA: Gold
Thirty Three & 1/3	Label: Dark Horse; Released: 19 November 1976 (UK); Released: 24 November 1976 (US)	35	27	—	10	—	23	—	17	—	11	BPI: Silver; RIAA: Gold
George Harrison	Label: Dark Horse; Released: 20 February 1979 (US); Released: 23 February 1979 (UK)	39	52	—	14	—	38	39	21	—	14	RIAA: Gold
Somewhere in England	Label: Dark Horse; Released: 1 June 1981 (US); Released: 5 June 1981 (UK)	13	17	15	14	36	31	42	2	13	11	
Gone Troppo	Label: Dark Horse; Released: 5 November 1982 (UK); Released: 8 November 1982 (US)	—	—	—	98	—	—	—	31	—	108	
Cloud Nine	Label: Dark Horse; Released: 2 November 1987 (UK); Released: 3 November 1987 (US)	10	10	26	6	15	28	30	8	5	8	BPI: Gold; RIAA: Platinum
Brainwashed	Label: Dark Horse; Released: 19 November 2002	29	—	62	24	17	21	—	9	18	18	BPI: Gold; RIAA: Gold; MC: Gold
"—" denotes albums that did not chart or were not released in that region.

=== The Traveling Wilburys studio albums ===
Title	Details	Peak chart positions									Certifications (sales threshold)
Title	Details	UK	AUS	AUT	CAN	NOR	NZ	SWE	SWI	US	Certifications (sales threshold)
Traveling Wilburys Vol. 1	Label: Wilbury Records; Released: 18 October 1988 (US) 24 October 1988 (UK)	16	1	3	1	2	2	2	6	3	AUS: 6× Platinum; CAN: 6× Platinum; UK: Platinum; US: 3× Platinum
Traveling Wilburys Vol. 3	Label: Wilbury Records; Released: 29 October 1990	14	14	22	6	3	19	5	18	11	AUS: Platinum; CAN: Platinum; UK: Gold; US: Platinum

=== Live albums ===
List of live albums, with selected chart positions and certifications
Title	Album details	Peak chart positions									Certifications
Title	Album details	UK	AUS	CAN	GER	JPN	NL	NOR	SWE	US	Certifications
The Concert for Bangladesh	Label: Apple/EMI (US) Epic/Sony (UK); Released: 20 December 1971 (US); Released: 10 January 1972 (UK)	1	3	2	29	2	1	1	2	2	RIAA: Gold
Live in Japan	Label: Dark Horse/Warner Bros.; Released: 13 July 1992 (UK); Released: 14 July 1992 (US)	—	—	—	—	15	—	—	—	126	
"—" denotes albums that did not chart or were not released in that region.

=== Compilation albums ===
List of compilation albums, with selected chart positions and certifications
Title	Album details	Peak chart positions									Certifications
Title	Album details	UK	AUS	AUT	CAN	GER	JPN	NL	NOR	US	Certifications
The Best of George Harrison	Label: Parlophone, EMI; Released: 8 November 1976 (US); Released: 20 November 1976 (UK)	100	59	25	50	—	51	—	—	31	BPI: Gold; RIAA: Gold
Best of Dark Horse 1976–1989	Label: Dark Horse, Warner Bros.; Released: 17 October 1989 (US); Released: 23 October 1989 (UK)	—	—	—	—	—	51	—	—	132	
Let It Roll: Songs by George Harrison	Label: Capitol, EMI; Released: 16 June 2009	4	—	—	18	91	40	—	—	24	BPI: Gold
Early Takes: Volume 1	Label: UM^{e}; Released: 1 May 2012	66	—	—	51	—	88	61	37	20	
"—" denotes albums that did not chart or were not released in that region.

=== Box sets ===
Title	Album details	Notes
The Dark Horse Years 1976–1992	Label: Dark Horse; Released: 23 February 2004	Includes six albums from Thirty Three & 1/3 to Live in Japan, as well as a DVD with additional material
Collaborations (with Ravi Shankar)	Label: Dark Horse; Released: 19 October 2010	Includes three studio albums produced by Harrison and originally issued as Shankar releases, along with a 1974 concert DVD
The Apple Years 1968–75	Label: Apple / Universal Music; Released: 22 September 2014	Includes Harrison's first six solo albums, digitally remastered from the original analogue masters, with previously unreleased material, along with a DVD exclusive to the box set
George Harrison – The Vinyl Collection	Label: Universal Music; Released: 24 February 2017	Contains vinyl editions of all 12 of Harrison's studio albums, Live in Japan, and the 12-inch picture discs for "Got My Mind Set on You" and "When We Was Fab"

=== The Traveling Wilburys box set ===
Title	Details	Peak chart positions								Certifications (sales threshold)
Title	Details	UK	AUS	AUT	NOR	NZ	SWE	SWI	US	Certifications (sales threshold)
The Traveling Wilburys Collection	Label: Wilbury Records; Released: 11 June 2007	1	1	24	1	1	2	45	9	AUS: 2× Platinum; UK: Platinum; US: Gold

== Singles ==
=== Solo ===
List of singles, with selected chart positions
Title	Year	Peak chart positions										Sales	Album
Title	Year	UK	AUS	CAN	GER	IRE	NLD	NOR	SWE	SWI	US	Sales	Album
"My Sweet Lord" "Isn't It a Pity" (US) b/w "What Is Life" (UK)	1970	1	1	1	1	1	1	1	1	1	1	BPI: Platinum; RIAA: Platinum; RIAJ: 2× Platinum	All Things Must Pass
"What Is Life" b/w "Apple Scruffs"	1971	—	1	3	3	—	2	13	—	1	10		All Things Must Pass
"Bangla Desh" "Deep Blue"	1971	10	15	13	23	18	7	3	8	2	23		non-album single
"Give Me Love (Give Me Peace on Earth)" b/w "Miss O'Dell"	1973	8	9	9	28	10	7	4	—	—	1		Living in the Material World
"Dark Horse" b/w "I Don't Care Anymore"	1974	—	—	26	46	—	—	—	—	—	15		Dark Horse
"Ding Dong, Ding Dong" b/w "Hari's on Tour (Express)"	1974	38	—	63	31	—	10	—	—	—	36		Dark Horse
"You" b/w "World of Stone"	1975	38	—	9	43	—	—	—	19	—	20		Extra Texture (Read All About It)
"This Guitar (Can't Keep from Crying)" b/w "Māya Love"	1975	—	—	—	—	—	—	—	—	—	—		Extra Texture (Read All About It)
"This Song" b/w "Learning How to Love You"	1976	—	—	30	—	—	30	—	—	—	25		Thirty Three & 1/3
"Crackerbox Palace" b/w "Learning How to Love You"	1977	—	78	19	—	—	—	—	—	—	19		Thirty Three & 1/3
"True Love" b/w "Pure Smokey"	1977	—	—	—	—	—	—	—	—	—	—		Thirty Three & 1/3
"It's What You Value" b/w "Woman Don't You Cry for Me"	1977	—	—	—	—	—	—	—	—	—	—		Thirty Three & 1/3
"Blow Away" b/w "Soft-Hearted Hana"	1979	51	34	7	—	—	—	—	—	—	16		George Harrison
"Love Comes to Everyone" b/w "Soft Touch"	1979	—	—	—	—	—	—	—	—	—	—		George Harrison
"Faster" b/w "Your Love is Forever"	1979	—	—	—	—	—	—	—	—	—	—		George Harrison
"All Those Years Ago" b/w "Writing's on the Wall"	1981	13	9	3	44	4	43	2	11	8	2		Somewhere in England
"Teardrops" b/w "Save the World"	1981	—	—	—	—	—	—	—	—	—	102		Somewhere in England
"Wake Up My Love" b/w "Greece"	1982	—	—	—	—	—	—	—	—	—	53		Gone Troppo
"I Really Love You" b/w "Circles"	1983	—	—	—	—	—	—	—	—	—	—		Gone Troppo
"Dream Away" b/w "Unknown Delight"	1983	—	—	—	—	—	—	—	—	—	—		Gone Troppo
"I Don't Want to Do It" b/w "Queen of the Hop"	1985	—	—	—	—	—	—	—	—	—	—		Porky's Revenge soundtrack
"Got My Mind Set on You" b/w "Lay His Head"	1987	2	1	1	7	1	9	10	10	11	1	BPI: Gold; GLF: Gold; RIAA: Gold	Cloud Nine
"When We Was Fab" b/w "Zig Zag"	1988	25	—	20	40	24	52	—	—	—	23		Cloud Nine
"This Is Love" b/w "Breath Away from Heaven"	1988	55	—	—	—	—	—	—	—	—	—		Cloud Nine
"Cheer Down" b/w "That's What it Takes" (US B-side) "Poor Little Girl" (UK B-side)	1989	—	—	53	—	—	—	—	—	—	—		Lethal Weapon 2 soundtrack
"Here Comes the Sun" (Live)	1992	—	—	—	—	—	—	—	—	—	—		Live in Japan
"My Sweet Lord (2000)" † b/w "All Things Must Pass"	2001	—	—	—	74	—	—	—	—	—	—		All Things Must Pass (30th Anniversary Edition)
"My Sweet Lord" (reissue)	2002	1	62	1	—	5	46	18	56	61	94		All Things Must Pass (30th Anniversary Edition)
"Any Road" b/w "Marwa Blues"	2003	37	—	—	—	—	—	—	—	—	—		Brainwashed
"—" denotes singles that did not chart or were not released in that region. † denotes jukebox-only single.

=== The Traveling Wilburys ===
Single	Year	Peak chart positions								Certifications	Album
Single	Year	UK	AUS	CAN	IRE	NZ	US	US Main	US AC	Certifications	Album
"Handle with Care"	1988	21	3	2	12	4	45	2	30		Traveling Wilburys Vol. 1
"End of the Line"	1989	52	12	8	14	11	63	2	28	UK: Silver	Traveling Wilburys Vol. 1
"Heading for the Light"	1989	—	88	—	—	—	—	7	—		Traveling Wilburys Vol. 1
"Nobody's Child"	1990	44	66	—	—	9	—	—	—		Nobody's Child: Romanian Angel Appeal
"She's My Baby"	1990	79	58	30	—	—	—	2	—		Traveling Wilburys Vol. 3
"Inside Out"	1990	—	117	50	—	—	—	16	—		Traveling Wilburys Vol. 3
"Wilbury Twist"	1991	—	137	86	—	—	—	46	—		Traveling Wilburys Vol. 3
"—" denotes releases that did not chart

=== Promotional singles ===
The following is a list of songs by Harrison that were released as promotional singles in the United States, showing their peak positions on Billboard's Adult Contemporary and Mainstream Rock listings, where applicable.

Title	Year	Peak chart positions				Album
Title	Year	US AC	US Main.	US AAA	US Heritage Rock	Album
"Shanghai Surprise" (with Vicki Brown)	1986	—	—	—	—	non-album promo single
"Here Comes the Sun" (Live)	1987	—	—	—	—	The Prince's Trust Concert 1987
"Devil's Radio"	1987	—	4	—	—	Cloud Nine
"Cloud 9"	1988	—	9	—	—	Cloud Nine
"Poor Little Girl"	1989	—	21	—	—	Best of Dark Horse 1976–1989
"My Sweet Lord" (Live)	1992	—	—	—	—	Live in Japan
"Stuck Inside a Cloud"	2002	27	—	15	30	Brainwashed
"—" denotes promotional singles that did not chart

=== Billboard Year-End performances ===
Year	Song	Year-End position
1971	"My Sweet Lord"	31
1973	"Give Me Love (Give Me Peace on Earth)"	42
1981	"All Those Years Ago"	74
1988	"Got My Mind Set on You"	3

== Contributions to multi-artist compilations ==
Title	Release details	Harrison contribution
Greenpeace – The Album	Label: EMI (UK), A&M (US); Released: 4 June 1985 (UK) 19 August 1985 (US)	Re-recorded version of his Somewhere in England song "Save the World"
Recorded Highlights of the Prince's Trust Concert 1987	Label: A&M; Released: 14 August 1987 (UK)	Live versions of "While My Guitar Gently Weeps" and "Here Comes the Sun", recorded at London's Wembley Arena in June 1987
Nobody's Child: Romanian Angel Appeal	Label: Warner Bros.; Released: 23 July 1990	Acoustic guitar and vocals on Saturday Night Live performance of "Homeward Bound" with Paul Simon
The Bunbury Tails soundtrack	Label: Polydor; Released: 5 October 1992 (UK)	New composition "Ride Rajbun", recorded in March 1988
Bob Dylan: The 30th Anniversary Concert Celebration	Label: Columbia; Released: 19 July 1993 (UK) 24 August 1993 (US)	Live performance of Dylan's "Absolutely Sweet Marie"
Mo's Songs!	Label: Warner Bros.; Released: 1994 (US) (Promo only)	New composition "Mo", a tribute to Mo Ostin
Blue Suede Shoes: A Rockabilly Session	Label: Snapper Music; Released: 6 June 2006	A recording of a 1985 concert by Carl Perkins & Friends features Harrison performing "Everybody's Trying to Be My Baby" and "Blue Suede Shoes"

== Collaborations and other appearances ==
Year	Album/single	Collaborator	Comment
1965	"You've Got to Hide Your Love Away"	The Silkie	Percussion
1968	James Taylor	James Taylor	Backing vocals on "Carolina in my Mind"
1969	Goodbye	Cream	Electric guitar on "Badge" (under the pseudonym L'Angelo Misterioso)
1969	Is This What You Want?	Jackie Lomax	Electric and acoustic guitars; album produced by Harrison
1969	"Hare Krishna Mantra"	Radha Krishna Temple (London)	Electric guitar, harmonium and bass; A- and B-sides produced by Harrison
1969	That's the Way God Planned It	Billy Preston	Electric and acoustic guitars, Moog synthesizer and sitar; album produced by Harrison
1969	Songs for a Tailor	Jack Bruce	Electric guitar on "Never Tell Your Mother She's Out of Tune" (under the pseudonym L'Angelo Misterioso)
1970	"All That I've Got (I'm Gonna Give It to You)"	Billy Preston	Electric or bass guitar; A-side produced by Harrison
1970	"Instant Karma!"	Plastic Ono Band	Electric guitar, piano and backing vocals
1970	"How the Web Was Woven"	Jackie Lomax	A-side produced by Harrison
1970	"Govinda"	Radha Krishna Temple (London)	Acoustic guitar, harmonium and bass; A- and B-sides produced by Harrison
1970	Leon Russell	Leon Russell	Electric guitar
1970	Doris Troy	Doris Troy	Electric guitar; album co-produced by Harrison
1970	Encouraging Words	Billy Preston	Electric guitar, Moog synthesizer and backing vocals; album co-produced by Harrison
1970	"Tell the Truth"	Derek and the Dominos	Electric guitar on A-side, slide guitar on "Roll It Over"
1970	The Worst of Ashton, Gardner & Dyke	Ashton, Gardner & Dyke	Electric guitar and uncredited production assistance on "I'm Your Spiritual Breadman" (under the pseudonym George O'Hara Smith)
1970	New Morning	Bob Dylan	Electric guitar on "Went to See the Gypsy" and "Sign on the Window"
1970	Yoko Ono/Plastic Ono Band	Yoko Ono	Uncredited musical contribution
1971	"It Don't Come Easy"	Ringo Starr	Electric guitar on A-side, and slide guitar, piano, acoustic guitar, dobro and bass on "Early 1970"; A-side produced by Harrison
1971	"Try Some, Buy Some"	Ronnie Spector	Electric and acoustic guitars; A- and B-sides co-produced by Harrison
1971	The Radha Krsna Temple	Radha Krishna Temple (London)	Electric and acoustic guitars, harmonium, bass and percussion; album produced by Harrison
1971	Joi Bangla EP	Ravi Shankar	A- and B-sides produced by Harrison
1971	Imagine	John Lennon	Slide guitar on "How Do You Sleep?", "Gimme Some Truth" and "I Don't Want to Be a Soldier, Mama", electric guitar on "Oh My Love", dobro on "Crippled Inside"
1971	Footprint	Gary Wright	Electric and acoustic guitars, and dobro (under the pseudonym George O'Hara); uncredited production on "Stand for Our Rights" and "Two Faced Man"
1971	I Wrote a Simple Song	Billy Preston	Dobro on "I Wrote a Simple Song"
1971	Raga soundtrack	Ravi Shankar	Album produced by Harrison
1971	Straight Up	Badfinger	Slide guitar on "Day After Day", electric and acoustic guitars on "I'd Die, Baby"; "Day After Day", "I'd Die, Baby", "Suitcase" and "Name of the Game" co-produced by Harrison
1972	David Bromberg	David Bromberg	Slide guitar on "The Holdup"
1972	"Sweet Music"	Lon & Derrek Van Eaton	A-side produced by Harrison
1972	"Back Off Boogaloo"	Ringo Starr	Slide and acoustic guitars; A-side produced by Harrison
1972	Bobby Whitlock	Bobby Whitlock	Electric guitar
1972	Some Time in New York City	John Lennon/Yoko Ono/Plastic Ono Band	Electric guitar on "Cold Turkey" and "Don't Worry Kyoko"
1972	Bobby Keys	Bobby Keys	Electric guitar
1972	Son of Schmilsson	Harry Nilsson	Slide guitar on "You're Breakin' My Heart" (under the pseudonym George Harrysong)
1972	"Goodbye Sunday"	Gary Wright	Slide guitar on A-side; recorded for Wright's cancelled album Ring of Changes and subsequently released as a soundtrack single
1973	In Concert 1972	Ravi Shankar and Ali Akbar Khan	Album co-produced by Harrison
1973	The Tin Man Was a Dreamer	Nicky Hopkins	Electric and slide guitars (under the pseudonym George O'Hara)
1973	Los Cochinos	Cheech & Chong	Electric guitar on "Basketball Jones"
1973	"Photograph"	Ringo Starr	Slide and electric guitars on "Down and Out"; B-side co-produced by Harrison (A-side included on Ringo album)
1973	Hobos, Heroes and Street Corner Clowns	Don Nix	Slide guitar on "I Need You"
1973	It's Like You Never Left	Dave Mason	Slide guitar on "If You've Got Love" (under the pseudonym Son of Harry)
1973	Ringo	Ringo Starr	Slide, electric and acoustic guitars, and backing vocals, on "Photograph", "I'm the Greatest", "Sunshine Life for Me" and "You and Me (Babe)"
1973	On the Road to Freedom	Alvin Lee and Mylon LeFevre	Acoustic guitar, dobro, bass and harmony vocal on "So Sad (No Love of His Own)" (under the pseudonym Hari Georgeson) and uncredited contributions to other tracks
1974	Son of Dracula soundtrack	Harry Nilsson	Percussion on "Daybreak"
1974	The Place I Love	Splinter	Electric and acoustic guitars, dobro, bass, Moog synthesizer, harmonium, bass, percussion and backing vocals (under the pseudonyms Hari Georgeson, Jai Raj Harisein and P. Roducer); album produced by Harrison
1974	Shankar Family & Friends	Ravi Shankar	Electric and acoustic guitars, and autoharp (under the pseudonym Hari Georgeson); album produced by Harrison
1974	I've Got My Own Album to Do	Ronnie Wood	Slide guitar and backing vocals on "Far East Man"
1975	It's My Pleasure	Billy Preston	Electric guitar on "That's Life" (under the pseudonym Hari Georgeson)
1975	Hard Times	Peter Skellern	Slide guitar on "Make Love, Not War"
1975	Harder to Live	Splinter	Electric guitar on "Lonely Man" and "After Five Years" (under the pseudonym Hari Georgeson); "Lonely Man" co-produced by Harrison
1975	"The Lumberjack Song"	Monty Python	A-side produced by Harrison
1975	New York Connection	Tom Scott	Slide guitar on "Appolonia (Foxtrata)"
1976	Ravi Shankar's Music Festival from India	Ravi Shankar	Album produced by Harrison
1976	Cross Words	Larry Hosford	Dobro on "Direct Me", backing vocals on "Wishing I Could"
1977	Two Man Band	Splinter	Electric and acoustic guitars on "Round and Round" and "Motions of Love"
1978	Along the Red Ledge	Hall & Oates	Slide guitar on "The Last Time"
1979	"Always Look on the Bright Side of Life"	Monty Python	Backing vocals; A-side remixed by Harrison
1981	The Visitor	Mick Fleetwood	Slide and acoustic guitars and backing vocals on "Walk a Thin Line"
1981	Stop and Smell the Roses	Ringo Starr	Slide, electric and acoustic guitars, and backing vocals; "Wrack My Brain" and "You Belong to Me" produced by Harrison
1982	Lead Me to the Water	Gary Brooker	Slide guitar on "Mineral Man"
1985	Water soundtrack	Mike Moran	Electric guitar
1986	Blind Faith (reissue)	Blind Faith	Electric guitar on "Exchange and Mart"
1986	Detroit Diesel	Alvin Lee	Slide guitar on "Talk Don't Bother Me"
1986	The Hunting of the Snark	Mike Batt	Slide guitar and backing vocals on "Children of the Sky"
1987	Recorded Highlights of the Prince's Trust Concert 1987	Ringo Starr	Guitar and vocals on Starr's performance of "With a Little Help from My Friends"
1987	His Twangy Guitar and the Rebels	Duane Eddy	Slide guitar and uncredited production on "The Trembler" and "Theme for Something Really Important"
1987	Tana Mana	The Ravi Shankar Project	Backing vocals on "Tana Mana", autoharp on "Friar Park" and synthesizer
1988	Love's a State of Mind	Sylvia Griffin	Slide guitar on "Love's a State of Mind"
1988	Who I Am	Gary Wright	Slide guitar on "(I Don't Wanna) Hold Back"
1988	Some Come Running	Jim Capaldi	Slide and electric guitars
1989	Mystery Girl	Roy Orbison	Acoustic guitar on "A Love So Beautiful"
1989	Full Moon Fever	Tom Petty	Acoustic guitar and backing vocals on "I Won't Back Down"
1989	Runaway Horses	Belinda Carlisle	Slide guitar on "Leave a Light On", six-string bass and twelve-string guitars on "Deep Deep Ocean"
1989	Journeyman	Eric Clapton	Slide guitar and backing vocals on "Run So Far"
1990	About Love and Life	Vicki Brown	Slide guitar on "Lu Le La"
1990	Still Got the Blues	Gary Moore	Slide guitar and vocals on "That Kind of Woman"
1990	Hell to Pay	Jeff Healey Band	Acoustic guitar and backing vocals on "While My Guitar Gently Weeps"
1990	Work It Out	Jim Horn	Slide guitar on "Take Away the Sadness"
1990	Armchair Theatre	Jeff Lynne	Slide guitar, acoustic guitar and backing vocals on "Every Little Thing", "Lift Me Up", "September Song" and "Stormy Weather"
1990	Nobody's Child: Romanian Angel Appeal	Eric Clapton	Writer, electric guitar and backing vocals on "That Kind of Woman"
1990	Under the Red Sky	Bob Dylan	Slide guitar on "Under the Red Sky"
1991	"Callin' Out My Name"	Del Shannon	Backing vocals on "Hot Love"
1991	The Bootleg Series Volumes 1–3 (Rare & Unreleased) 1961–1991	Bob Dylan	Slide guitar on "If Not For You" (unreleased version from New Morning sessions)
1992	Growing Up in Public	Jimmy Nail	Slide guitar on "Real Love"
1992	Zoom	Alvin Lee	Slide guitar on "Real Life Blues"
1993	Bob Dylan: The 30th Anniversary Concert Celebration	Bob Dylan, Tom Petty, Roger McGuinn, Eric Clapton et al.	Acoustic guitar and vocals on "My Back Pages" and "Knockin' on Heaven's Door"
1993	Leon Russell (reissue)	Leon Russell	Further contributions on CD bonus tracks (outtakes from 1969 sessions): electric guitar on "(The New) Sweet Home Chicago", acoustic guitar on "Indian Girl"
1994	Nineteen Ninety-Four	Alvin Lee	Slide guitar on "The Bluest Blues" and "I Want You (She's So Heavy)"
1995	First Signs of Life	Gary Wright	Backing vocals on "Don't Try to Own Me"
1996	Ravi Shankar: In Celebration	Ravi Shankar	Compilation produced by Harrison; also includes previously unreleased tracks that Harrison produced
1996	Go Cat Go!	Carl Perkins	Slide and acoustic guitars, piano, synthesizer, bass and backing vocals; "Distance Makes No Difference with Love" produced by Harrison
1997	Chants of India	Ravi Shankar	Acoustic guitar, bass, autoharp, vibraphone, glockenspiel and backing vocals; album produced by Harrison
1998	A Complete Career Anthology: 1961–1990	Del Shannon	Backing vocals on "Hot Love" (alternate version)
1998	Vertical Man	Ringo Starr	Slide guitar on "King of Broken Hearts", slide and electric guitar on "I'll Be Fine Anywhere"
1998	John Lennon Anthology	John Lennon	Electric guitar on "I'm the Greatest" (outtake from the 1973 Ringo session for the song)
1999	"In the First Place"	The Remo Four	Backing vocals; A- and B-sides produced by Harrison in 1967, during sessions for Wonderwall Music
2000	How Far Have You Come?	Rubyhorse	Slide guitar on "Punchdrunk"
2001	Zoom	Electric Light Orchestra	Slide guitar on "A Long Time Gone" and "All She Wanted"
2001	Double Bill	Bill Wyman's Rhythm Kings	Slide guitar on "Love Letters"
2001	Living on the Outside	Jim Capaldi	Slide guitar on "Anna Julia"
2001	Small World, Big Band	Jools Holland's Rhythm and Blues Orchestra	Vocals on "Horse to the Water" (Harrison's final recording)
2006	"This Guitar (Can't Keep from Crying)" (Platinum Weird version)	Platinum Weird	Vocals and acoustic guitar (recorded in 1992 with David A. Stewart)
2010	Connected (Deluxe Digital Edition)	Gary Wright	Guitar on "Never Give Up" (recorded in 1989)
2010	On Tour with Eric Clapton (2010 deluxe edition box set)	Delaney & Bonnie and Friends	Electric guitar (under the pseudonym L'Angelo Misterioso)
2011	Dear Mr. Fantasy: The Jim Capaldi Story	Jim Capaldi	Harmony vocals on "Love's Got a Hold of Me"
2013	The Bootleg Series Vol. 10 – Another Self Portrait (1969–1971)	Bob Dylan	Acoustic guitar and vocals on "Time Passes Slowly #1" and electric guitar on "Working on a Guru" (unreleased recordings from the New Morning sessions)

== Videography ==
=== Video albums ===
List of video albums, with selected certifications
Title	Album details	Certifications
The Concert for Bangladesh (as George Harrison & Friends)	Label: Apple; Released: 24 October 2005; Format: DVD	RIAA: 4× Platinum; ARIA: Platinum
George Harrison: Living in the Material World	Label: Lions Gate Home Entertainment; Released: 10 October 2011; Format: DVD, Blu-ray	BPI: Platinum; CRIA: 2× Platinum

=== Music videos ===
Year	Title	Director	Album
1974	"Dark Horse"	Unknown	Dark Horse
1974	"Ding Dong Ding Dong"	Unknown	Dark Horse
1976	"This Song"	George Harrison	Thirty Three & 1/3
1976	"Crackerbox Palace"	Eric Idle	Thirty Three & 1/3
1976	"True Love"	Eric Idle	Thirty Three & 1/3
1979	"Blow Away"	Neil Innes	George Harrison
1979	"Faster"	Unknown	George Harrison
1981	"All Those Years Ago"	Unknown	Somewhere in England
1987	"Got My Mind Set on You" (2 versions)	Gary Weis	Cloud Nine
1987	"When We Was Fab"	Godley & Creme	Cloud Nine
1988	"This Is Love"	Morton Jankel	Cloud Nine
2003	"Any Road"	Simon Hilton	Brainwashed
2016	"What Is Life"	Brandon Moore	All Things Must Pass
2021	"My Sweet Lord (2020 Mix)"	Lance Bangs	All Things Must Pass 50th Anniversary
2025	"Give Me Love (Give Me Peace on Earth) (2024 Mix)"	Finn Wolfhard	Living in the Material World 50th Anniversary

=== The Traveling Wilburys music videos ===
Year	Title	Director	Album
1988	"Tweeter and the Monkey Man"	George Harrison	Traveling Wilburys Vol. 1
1988	"Handle with Care"	David Leland	Traveling Wilburys Vol. 1
1989	"End of the Line"	David Leland	Traveling Wilburys Vol. 1
1990	"Nobody's Child"	Derek Hayes	Nobody's Child: Romanian Angel Appeal
1990	"She's My Baby"	David Leland	Traveling Wilburys Vol. 3
1990	"Inside Out"	David Leland	Traveling Wilburys Vol. 3
1991	"Wilbury Twist" (2 versions)	Dick Clement and Ian La Frenais	Traveling Wilburys Vol. 3

=== Collaborations in music videos ===
Year	Title	Other Performer	Director	Album
1985	"Freedom"	Eric Clapton, Ringo Starr and others	Unknown	Water
1989	"I Won't Back Down"	Tom Petty	David Leland	Full Moon Fever
2001	"Anna Julia"	Jim Capaldi	Vanessa Warwick	Living on the Outside

== See also ==
- The Beatles albums discography
- The Beatles singles discography
- Ringo Starr discography
- Traveling Wilburys discography

== Sources ==
- Keith Badman, The Beatles Diary Volume 2: After the Break-Up 1970–2001, Omnibus Press (London, 2001; ISBN 0-7119-8307-0).
- Harry Castleman & Walter J. Podrazik, All Together Now: The First Complete Beatles Discography 1961–1975, Ballantine Books (New York, NY, 1976; ISBN 0-345-25680-8).
- Alan Clayson, George Harrison, Sanctuary (London, 2003; ISBN 1-86074-489-3).
- The Editors of Rolling Stone, Harrison, Rolling Stone Press/Simon & Schuster (New York, NY, 2002; ISBN 0-7432-3581-9).
- Walter Everett, The Beatles as Musicians: Revolver through the Anthology, Oxford University Press (New York, NY, 1999; ISBN 0-19-512941-5).
- Clinton Heylin, Bob Dylan: Behind the Shades (20th Anniversary Edition), Faber and Faber (London, 2011; ISBN 978-0-571-27240-2).
- Ian Inglis, The Words and Music of George Harrison, Praeger (Santa Barbara, CA, 2010; ISBN 978-0-313-37532-3).
- Peter Lavezzoli, The Dawn of Indian Music in the West, Continuum (New York, NY, 2006; ISBN 0-8264-2819-3).
- Simon Leng, While My Guitar Gently Weeps: The Music of George Harrison, Hal Leonard (Milwaukee, WI, 2006; ISBN 1-4234-0609-5).
- Chip Madinger & Mark Easter, Eight Arms to Hold You: The Solo Beatles Compendium, 44.1 Productions (Chesterfield, MO, 2000; ISBN 0-615-11724-4).
- Robert Rodriguez, Fab Four FAQ 2.0: The Beatles' Solo Years, 1970–1980, Backbeat Books (Milwaukee, WI, 2010; ISBN 978-1-4165-9093-4).
- Ravi Shankar, Raga Mala: The Autobiography of Ravi Shankar, Welcome Rain (New York, NY, 1999; ISBN 1-56649-104-5).
- Bruce Spizer, The Beatles Solo on Apple Records, 498 Productions (New Orleans, LA, 2005; ISBN 0-9662649-5-9).
- Gary Tillery, Working Class Mystic: A Spiritual Biography of George Harrison, Quest Books (Wheaton, IL, 2011; ISBN 978-0-8356-0900-5).
- John C. Winn, That Magic Feeling: The Beatles' Recorded Legacy, Volume Two, 1966–1970, Three Rivers Press (New York, NY, 2009; ISBN 978-0-307-45239-9).
- Gary Wright, Dream Weaver: A Memoir; Music, Meditation, and My Friendship with George Harrison, Tarcher/Penguin (New York, NY, 2014; ISBN 978-0-399-16523-8).
