= George Harrison – The Vinyl Collection =

2017 compilation album

Box set by George Harrison
- Released: 24 February 2017
- Recorded: 1967–2002
- Genres: Rock, pop, folk rock, Indian classical, experimental
- Length: 680:21
- Label: Universal
- Producers: George Harrison; Phil Spector; Tom Scott; Russ Titelman; Ray Cooper; Phil McDonald; Jeff Lynne; Dhani Harrison

George Harrison chronology
The Apple Years 1968–75 (2014)	George Harrison – The Vinyl Collection (2017)	1970 – With Special Guest George Harrison (2021)

Professional ratings
Review scores
Source	Rating
Classic Rock	7/10
Daily Express	4/5 stars
Mojo	5/5 stars
The Spill Magazine	4/5
The Times	3/5 stars
Uncut	8/10
Under the Radar	8/10 stars

George Harrison – The Vinyl Collection is a box set by the English musician George Harrison, released on 24 February 2017. The box set contains sixteen vinyl LPs – comprising Harrison's entire output of studio albums from Wonderwall Music (1968) to the posthumously released Brainwashed (2002), together with the double live album Live in Japan (1992) – and two 12-inch vinyl, picture-disc singles.

The box set's release coincided with what would have been the artist's 74th birthday. Accompanying the release, Genesis Publications launched an extended edition of Harrison's 1980 autobiography, I, Me, Mine, featuring new material compiled by his widow, Olivia Harrison.

Among contemporary reviews, The Vinyl Collection received high ratings from publications such as Classic Rock, Mojo (who gave it a maximum five stars), Uncut and Under the Radar. Less impressed, Will Hodgkinson of The Times said that while some of the albums were "masterpieces", the box set was "for Harrison nuts only", given its high retail price (£389.99) and the uneven quality of the artist's solo career, although he added: "even in the less essential moments there are gems to be unearthed." Writing for the New York Observer, Ron Hart welcomed the release, saying that much of Harrison's work was routinely overlooked and the box set was an opportunity to "reassess the genius of a man whose influence can be heard through a diverse array of modern artists".

== Box-set contents ==
Disc no.	Original release
1	Wonderwall Music
2	Electronic Sound
3–5	All Things Must Pass
6	Living in the Material World
7	Dark Horse
8	Extra Texture (Read All About It)
9	Thirty Three & 1/3
10	George Harrison
11	Somewhere in England
12	Gone Troppo
13	Cloud Nine
14–15	Live in Japan
16	Brainwashed
17	"When We Was Fab" (12-inch single picture disc)
18	"Got My Mind Set on You" (12-inch single picture disc)
