= Let It Roll: Songs by George Harrison =

Greatest hits album by George Harrison
- Released: 16 June 2009
- Recorded: 1970–2001
- Genre: Rock
- Length: 77:26
- Labels: Dark Horse; Parlophone; Apple; Umlaut Corporation
- Producers: Ray Cooper; Dave Edmunds; Dhani Harrison; George Harrison; Jeff Lynne; Phil Spector; Russ Titelman

George Harrison chronology
The Dark; Horse Years; 1976–1992 (2004)	Let It Roll: Songs by George Harrison (2009)	Collaborations (with Ravi Shankar) (2010)

Let It Roll: Songs by George Harrison is the third compilation of songs recorded by the English singer-songwriter George Harrison, and the first to span his entire solo career after the Beatles era. The collection was announced on 14 April 2009, the same day that Harrison received a star on the Hollywood Walk of Fame, and was released 16 June 2009, on both CD and in digital format.

== Track selection ==
Let It Roll contains Harrison songs originally released on the Beatles' EMI-affiliated Apple Records and his Dark Horse label. All the tracks are presented in digitally remastered form, and the collection includes a 28-page booklet featuring previously unseen and rare photos together with an essay by music historian Warren Zanes. The track list was selected by George's widow, Olivia Harrison, with some assistance from close friends and family.

The album includes all of Harrison's songs that reached number 1 on the Billboard Hot 100 singles chart – "My Sweet Lord", "Isn't It a Pity", "Give Me Love (Give Me Peace on Earth)" and "Got My Mind Set on You", – as well as other international number 1 singles such as "What Is Life" and "All Those Years Ago". Live solo recordings of three Beatles songs ("While My Guitar Gently Weeps", "Something" and "Here Comes the Sun"), from the Grammy-winning album The Concert for Bangladesh, are also included.

iTunes exclusively offers the digital album with a previously unreleased bonus track, Harrison's demo version of "Isn't It a Pity".

Despite being marketed as Harrison's first career-spanning hits compilation, six of his twelve studio albums were not represented at all: Wonderwall Music (1968), Electronic Sound (1969), Dark Horse (1974), Extra Texture (Read All About It) (1975), Thirty Three & 1/3 (1976) and Gone Troppo (1982). In addition, several of his hit singles are absent from the track listing – songs such as "Bangla Desh", "Deep Blue", "Dark Horse", "Ding Dong, Ding Dong", "You", "This Song" and "Crackerbox Palace", all of which had charted in the top 40 of the Billboard Hot 100, as well as several songs that charted on Billboard's Adult Contemporary charts ("Love Comes to Everyone", "Stuck Inside a Cloud") and Mainstream Rock charts ("Devil's Radio", "Cloud 9", "Poor Little Girl"). No songs from Harrison's output with the Traveling Wilburys appear on the compilation. In July 2025, the album was reissued for vinyl.

== Critical reception ==
Professional ratings
Review scores
Source	Rating
AllMusic	4.5/5 stars
BBC	(favourable)
Contactmusic	9/10
PopMatters	6/10 stars
Record Collector	4/5 stars
Rolling Stone	4/5 stars
Spin	8/10 stars
Uncut	5/5 stars

In his review of Let It Roll, for Spin magazine, Andrew Hultkrans wrote that Harrison "arguably had a stronger, more consistent solo career than any of his [Beatles] bandmates", and added: "This hits collection avoids chronology, honouring the old and new alike as part of the same stylistic continuum."

Reception to the inclusion of live versions of Beatles-era compositions "While My Guitar Gently Weeps", "Something" and "Here Comes the Sun" was mixed. Some reviewers welcomed the songs as essential parts of Harrison's career, since the tracks came from his landmark Concert for Bangladesh shows in 1971; yet the same commentators suggested that the quality paled in comparison to the original studio recordings. Others compared the inclusion of Beatles-related material to EMI/Capitol 1976 compilation The Best of George Harrison, on which more than half of the tracks were songs recorded by the Beatles, thus downplaying the importance of Harrison's solo career. Some other critics wondered why Beatles songs were included, when songs from Harrison's supergroup the Traveling Wilburys (such as "Handle with Care") were overlooked.

== Commercial performance ==
The album debuted at number 4 in the United Kingdom, with first week sales of 28,045 copies, becoming Harrison's highest-charting album there since 1973's Living in the Material World. In the United States, the album debuted at number 24 on the Billboard 200 chart, and as of 5 July 2012 had sold over 164,000 copies. In 2012, it charted at number 9 on Billboard's Top Pop Catalog Albums.

== Track listing ==
All songs by George Harrison, except where noted.

No.	Title	Writer(s)	Original album	Length
1.	"Got My Mind Set On You"	Rudy Clark	Cloud Nine	3:52
2.	"Give Me Love (Give Me Peace on Earth)"		Living in the Material World	3:35
3.	"Ballad of Sir Frankie Crisp (Let It Roll)"		All Things Must Pass	3:48
4.	"My Sweet Lord"		All Things Must Pass	4:40
5.	"While My Guitar Gently Weeps" (live)		The Concert for Bangladesh	4:46
6.	"All Things Must Pass"		All Things Must Pass	3:46
7.	"Any Road"		Brainwashed	3:52
8.	"This Is Love"	George Harrison; Jeff Lynne	Cloud Nine	3:47
9.	"All Those Years Ago"		Somewhere in England	3:46
10.	"Marwa Blues"		Brainwashed	3:41
11.	"What Is Life"		All Things Must Pass	4:25
12.	"Rising Sun"		Brainwashed	5:27
13.	"When We Was Fab"	Harrison; Lynne	Cloud Nine	3:51
14.	"Something" (live)		The Concert for Bangladesh	3:10
15.	"Blow Away"		George Harrison	3:59
16.	"Cheer Down"	Harrison; Tom Petty	Lethal Weapon 2 soundtrack	4:06
17.	"Here Comes the Sun" (live)		The Concert for Bangladesh	2:54
18.	"I Don't Want to Do It"	Bob Dylan	Porky's Revenge soundtrack	2:54
19.	"Isn't It a Pity"		All Things Must Pass	7:07

iTunes Store bonus track
No.	Title	Original album	Length
20.	"Isn't It a Pity" (demo version)	previously unreleased	2:58

Album remastered by Giles Martin, individual producer credits are as follows:

- Tracks 1, 8, 13, and 16: Jeff Lynne and George Harrison
- Track 2: Harrison
- Tracks 3–6, 11, 14, 17, and 19: Harrison and Phil Spector
- Tracks 7, 10 and 12: Harrison, Lynne and Dhani Harrison
- Track 9: Harrison and Ray Cooper
- Track 15: Harrison and Russ Titelman
- Track 18: Dave Edmunds

== Charts ==
Chart (2009)	Position
Belgian Ultratop Albums Chart	98
Japanese Oricon Weekly Albums Chart	40
Mexican Albums Chart	41
Spanish Albums Chart	68
Swiss Music Charts	98
UK Albums Chart	4
US Billboard 200	24

== Certifications ==
Region	Certification	Certified units/sales
United Kingdom (BPI)	Gold	100,000^{*}
^{*} Sales figures based on certification alone.
