= The Dark Horse Years 1976–1992 =

Box set by George Harrison
- Released: 23 February 2004
- Recorded: May 1976–December 1991
- Genre: Rock
- Length: 313:06
- Label: Dark Horse
- Producers: George Harrison; Tom Scott; Russ Titelman; Ray Cooper; Phil McDonald; Jeff Lynne

George Harrison chronology
Brainwashed (2002)	The Dark Horse Years 1976–1992 (2004)	Let It Roll: Songs by George Harrison (2009)

The Dark Horse Years 1976–1992 is a box set of albums by the English rock musician George Harrison. It was released in 2004 and comprises most of the singer's output on his Dark Horse record label. The set contains Harrison's five studio albums from Thirty Three & 1/3 (1976) to Cloud Nine (1987), with bonus tracks, and his 1992 live album (spread over two discs) Live in Japan, which features a special SACD remix in addition to its original mix. The six albums were also made available as separate releases. The set's eighth disc, a DVD titled The Dark Horse Years, includes promotional videos of Harrison's singles from the 1976–88 era and footage from his 1991 Japanese tour. The box set was followed by the 2014 release of The Apple Years 1968–75, which compiles Harrison's output on the Beatles' Apple Records.

== Background ==
George Harrison's Dark Horse material had been issued on CD in 1991, but was allowed to go out of print some years later. By 2000, he was keen to reissue his entire catalogue, but only managed to oversee the 30th anniversary edition of All Things Must Pass before his death from cancer in November 2001. Following posthumous projects such as Brainwashed and Concert for George over 2002–03, Harrison's widow Olivia and son Dhani compiled the box set for release.

== Content and omissions ==
Harrison's intended artwork for Somewhere in England (1981) was reinstated for this 2004 reissue. In addition, the lettering on the front of the album George Harrison was modified from the original 1979 release.

Included in the eight-disc box set was a 36-page booklet containing rare photos, including several of Harrison taken by photographer Terry O'Neill. Among the essays in the booklet, music journalist David Fricke supplied an appreciation of Harrison's career on Dark Horse, and Olivia Harrison, who worked for the label in the 1970s, wrote a piece titled "The History of Dark Horse". All studio albums featured at least one bonus track, while the individual digital editions of the albums featured additional bonus tracks.

Despite the title of the set, not every track from Harrison's Dark Horse years appears. The song "Lay His Head", which was the B-side to "Got My Mind Set on You", and the two tracks that Harrison recorded for the compilation Best of Dark Horse 1976–1989 – "Cockamamie Business" and "Poor Little Girl" – are all omitted from The Dark Horse Years. "Cheer Down", which was Harrison's contribution to the 1989 film Lethal Weapon 2, is also not included, although a live version appears on Live in Japan, and non-album single "I Don't Want to Do It" is missing as well. Also missing is the song "Sat Singing" that was among other songs intended for Somewhere in England in 1980 but rejected by Dark Horse distributor Warner Bros. Records, forcing Harrison to record new material for that album. On the DVD, the videos for his singles "True Love", "Blow Away" and "All Those Years Ago" are similarly not included.

== Release and reception ==
Professional ratings
Review scores
Source	Rating
AllMusic	4/5 stars
Billboard	"Vital Reissue"
Encyclopedia of Popular Music	3/5 stars
Entertainment Weekly	C+
The Guardian	(favourable)
Mojo	(mixed)
The Music Box	3.5/5 stars
PopMatters	(favourable)
The Rolling Stone Album Guide	3.5/5 stars
Uncut	3/5 stars

The Dark Horse Years 1976–1992 was released on 23 February 2004 on the Dark Horse label, but distributed by EMI rather than Warner Bros. The release date roughly coincided with what would have been Harrison's 61st birthday and a period of recognition for his achievements as a solo artist, through the Concert for George and his induction into the Rock and Roll Hall of Fame. Each of the six albums in the box set was also available individually, and the DVD was later issued as an independent release.

In his review for Rolling Stone, Parke Puterbaugh wrote that, while Harrison's career on Dark Horse Records lacked an album as strong as his 1970 triple album All Things Must Pass, he released "some minor gems" between 1976 and 1992 that showed him "refin[ing] his craft" and grappling with conflicting philosophies regarding his sense of individuality and spiritual purpose. Puterbaugh concluded: "With all the honesty he could muster, Harrison addressed these philosophical divides while trying to create appealing pop music, too. The joy is that he succeeded so often." John Harris of Mojo admired the set as "beautifully presented" but he said the quality of the albums was indicative of all the former Beatles' decline as artists and that only Somewhere in England and Cloud Nine represented a consistent focus on Harrison's part.

Writing in The Guardian, James Griffiths opined that the box set "provides an illuminating service" by offering evidence of Harrison's humour and the quality of his songwriting long after the Beatles. Griffiths summed up the message: "The Under-Rated One, rather than the Quiet One, shall we say." Paul Du Noyer, writing in The Word, identified Thirty Three & 1/3 and Cloud Nine as the high points of the set. He said that Harrison, as a musician first and foremost, "maintained a quizzical distance from pop culture" and that "[his] innate caution kept his music inside a certain stylistic range, but also guaranteed a level of artistic consistency."

== Box-set contents ==
Disc no.	Original release	Bonus tracks
1	Thirty Three & 1/3	"Tears of the World"; "Learning How to Love You" (Early Mix) (digital edition only)
2	George Harrison	"Here Comes the Moon" (demo version); "Blow Away" (demo) (digital edition only)
3	Somewhere in England	"Save the World" (demo version); "Flying Hour" (digital edition only)
4	Gone Troppo	"Mystical One" (demo version)
5	Cloud Nine	"Shanghai Surprise"; "Zig Zag"; "Got My Mind Set on You" (extended version) (digital edition only)
6 & 7	Live in Japan SACD	
8	The Dark Horse Years 1976–1992 DVD: "Dark Horse Feature"; Music videos: 1. "This Song"; 2. "Crackerbox Palace"; 3. "Faster"; 4. "Got My Mind Set on You" (Version 1); 5. "Got My Mind Set on You" (Version 2); 6. "When We Was Fab"; 7. "This Is Love"; Selections from Live in Japan: 1. "Cheer Down"; 2. "Devil's Radio"; 3. "Cloud 9"; 4. "Taxman"; Selections from the film Shanghai Surprise: 1. "Shanghai Surprise"; 2. "Someplace Else"; 3. "Hottest Gong in Town"	
