= Any Road =

- UK picture sleeve

Single by George Harrison

from the album Brainwashed
- B-side: "Marwa Blues"
- Released: 12 May 2003
- Length: 3:49
- Label: Parlophone, Dark Horse
- Songwriter: George Harrison
- Producers: George Harrison; Jeff Lynne; Dhani Harrison

George Harrison singles chronology
"Stuck Inside a Cloud" (2002)	"Any Road" (2003)

Music video
- "Any Road" on YouTube

"Any Road" is the final single by George Harrison and is the opening track to his posthumous album Brainwashed. Harrison began writing the song in 1988, during the making of a video for his 1987 album Cloud Nine. It is the last released record of new material credited to George Harrison.

== Background ==
Harrison began writing the song in 1988 in Maui. He was filming a music video for This is Love.

Harrison's only known public performance of "Any Road" was a solo acoustic rendition in 1997, during an interview with Ravi Shankar conducted by VH1. It was Harrison's last television appearance before his death.

== Release and reception ==
"Any Road" was the last Harrison song to be released as a single. The song was released on 12 May 2003 as a single in the United Kingdom and peaked at number 37 on the UK Singles Chart.

The song was nominated at the 2004 Grammy Awards for Best Male Pop Vocal Performance, and was also featured on the 2004 Grammy Nominees compilation album. Although the song lost the award to Justin Timberlake's "Cry Me a River", Harrison's "Marwa Blues" (the instrumental B-side to "Any Road") won in the category of Best Pop Instrumental Performance.

A music video was made as a Slide show of Harrison's life through the decades feature footage from his early life, The Beatles music videos and clips of the band and general footage of Harrison. The music video also has clips from his solo career including several music videos throughout his career. it also has clips of film and television Harrison was a part of including Yellow Submarine, Monty Python's Life of Brian where Harrison cameos as Mr Papadopoulis and The Simpsons episode "Homer's Barbershop Quartet" which Harrison guest stars in.

== Personnel ==
- George Harrison – lead vocal, acoustic guitar, slide guitar, banjolele
- Jeff Lynne – bass guitar, piano, backing vocals
- Dhani Harrison – electric guitar, backing vocals
- Jim Keltner – drums

== Later release ==
Both "Any Road" and "Marwa Blues" were included in Harrison's 2009 career-spanning compilation, Let It Roll: Songs by George Harrison.

== Covers ==
- John Kadlecik played "Any Road" with Furthur as well as his own John Kadlecik Band.
- American ukulele player and singer, Ukulele Ray, covered this song on his Coming to Nothing album in 2010.
- Joe Brown performed "Any Road" on his live Ukulele Album in 2012.
- Butch Walker, American musician, former lead guitarist of metal band SouthGang performed "Any Road" during George Fest concert in 2014.

== Track listing ==
- 7" R6601, CD CDRS6601
1. "Any Road" – 3:49
2. "Marwa Blues" – 3:40
3. "Any Road" (video) – CD only
