= Cheer Down =

- US picture sleeve

Single by George Harrison

from the album Lethal Weapon 2
- B-side: "That's What It Takes" (US); "Poor Little Girl" (UK)
- Released: 22 August 1989 (US); 27 November 1989 (UK)
- Recorded: 1987, March 1989
- Studio: FPSHOT (Oxfordshire)
- Genre: Rock
- Length: 4:08
- Label: Warner Bros. (US), Dark Horse (UK)
- Songwriters: George Harrison, Tom Petty
- Producers: George Harrison, Jeff Lynne

George Harrison singles chronology
"This Is Love" (1988)	"Cheer Down" (1989)	"My Sweet Lord" (2002)

"Cheer Down" is a song by English musician George Harrison, first released in 1989. The track was his contribution to the soundtrack of the film Lethal Weapon 2 and was also issued as a single. Harrison wrote the song with Tom Petty and co-produced the recording with Jeff Lynne.

The song has since appeared on the Harrison compilation albums Best of Dark Horse and Let It Roll. A live version recorded with Eric Clapton was included on Harrison's 1992 album Live in Japan.

== Composition and recording ==
The title of the song is attributed to Harrison's wife Olivia, who would tell her husband, "Okay, cheer down, big fellow" when he became too enthusiastic. Harrison first recorded a rhythm track for the song during the sessions for his 1987 album Cloud Nine. He subsequently finished the lyrics with assistance from Tom Petty. The following year, along with "Run So Far" and "That Kind of Woman", "Cheer Down" was among the four compositions that Harrison offered to Eric Clapton for inclusion on the latter's album Journeyman. Clapton instead decided to use it for the soundtrack to the film Lethal Weapon 2, which he had been commissioned to supply, but he persuaded Harrison to contribute his own recording for inclusion in the film.

Harrison completed "Cheer Down" at his home studio, FPSHOT, in March 1989. The song was again co-produced by Jeff Lynne, who had served the same role on Cloud Nine, in addition to forming the Traveling Wilburys with Harrison and Petty. The completed recording features a long closing slide guitar solo that author Simon Leng admires for its fluency and variation. In Leng's description, during this section, Harrison's playing "runs the gamut from Indian blues chops to two-part countermelodies and sweeping Pete Drake jaunts through the octaves".

== Release ==
"Cheer Down" was used over the closing credits of Lethal Weapon 2. It was then issued as the opening track on the accompanying soundtrack album, released on 10 August 1989 in the United States, and as a single to promote the film there, on 22 August. Issued on Warner Bros. Records, the single's B-side was "That's What It Takes", a track from Cloud Nine. The UK release, which took place on 27 November, on Harrison's Warner-distributed Dark Horse record label, instead used the newly recorded "Poor Little Girl" as the B-side. The single was the last such release by Harrison as a solo artist during his lifetime.

In October 1989, "Cheer Down" was included on Harrison's Dark Horse Records compilation album Best of Dark Horse 1976–1989, as the final track. Although Best of Dark Horse is no longer in print, "Cheer Down" was included on the 2009 career-spanning compilation Let It Roll: Songs by George Harrison. It also appeared on the reissued soundtrack album in 2013, as part of a box set titled Lethal Weapon Soundtrack Collection.

== Live version ==
Harrison performed "Cheer Down" throughout his 1991 Japanese tour with Clapton, which was Harrison's first tour since 1974. "Cheer Down" was the most recent song included in Harrison's set list; in addition, it was one of the few selections to showcase his slide guitar playing, since otherwise he delegated his slide parts to Clapton's guitarist, Andy Fairweather-Low. During the concerts, Harrison took to introducing it as a song from the musical South Pacific. A version recorded on 15 December 1991 at the Tokyo Dome appears on Harrison's 1992 double album Live in Japan. He also performed it at the Natural Law Party Concert, held at the Royal Albert Hall in London on 6 April 1992. For this performance – which was Harrison's only full-length concert as a solo artist in Britain – Petty's lead guitarist in the Heartbreakers, Mike Campbell, replaced Clapton.

American dobro player Rainer Ptacek performed "Cheer Down" in 1997. Along with a version of Harrison's Beatles track "Within You Without You", the song was issued on Ptacek's 2001 album Live at the Performance Center.

== Track listings ==
- US (Warner Bros. Records): 7-inch vinyl 7-22807, cassette 4-22807
1. "Cheer Down"
2. "That's What It Takes"
- UK (Dark Horse Records): 7-inch vinyl W2696
1. "Cheer Down"
2. "Poor Little Girl"
- UK (Dark Horse Records): 12-inch single W2696T, CD W2696CD, cassette W2696C
1. "Cheer Down"
2. "Poor Little Girl"
3. "Crackerbox Palace"

== Personnel ==
The following personnel are credited by Simon Leng:

- George Harrison – vocals, guitar, slide guitars
- Jeff Lynne – bass, guitar, keyboards, backing vocals
- Richard Tandy – piano
- Ray Cooper – percussion
- Ian Paice – drums

== Sources ==
- Badman, Keith (2001). The Beatles Diary Volume 2: After the Break-Up 1970–2001. London: Omnibus Press. ISBN 978-0-7119-8307-6.
- Clayson, Alan (2003). George Harrison. London: Sanctuary. ISBN 1-86074-489-3.
- The Editors of Rolling Stone (2002). Harrison. New York, NY: Rolling Stone Press. ISBN 978-0-7432-3581-5.
- Harry, Bill (2003). The George Harrison Encyclopedia. London: Virgin Books. ISBN 978-0-7535-0822-0.
- Huntley, Elliot J. (2006). Mystical One: George Harrison – After the Break-up of the Beatles. Toronto, ON: Guernica Editions. ISBN 1-55071-197-0.
- Inglis, Ian (2010). The Words and Music of George Harrison. Santa Barbara, CA: Praeger. ISBN 978-0-313-37532-3.
- Leng, Simon (2006). While My Guitar Gently Weeps: The Music of George Harrison. Milwaukee, WI: Hal Leonard. ISBN 978-1-4234-0609-9.
- Madinger, Chip; Easter, Mark (2000). Eight Arms to Hold You: The Solo Beatles Compendium. Chesterfield, MO: 44.1 Productions. ISBN 0-615-11724-4.
