= Marwa Blues =

Instrumental by George Harrison

from the album Brainwashed
- Released: 18 November 2002
- Length: 3:40
- Label: Dark Horse
- Songwriter: George Harrison
- Producers: George Harrison, Jeff Lynne, Dhani Harrison

"Marwa Blues" is an instrumental by English rock musician George Harrison. It was released on his final studio album, Brainwashed, in November 2002, a year after his death, and subsequently as the B-side of "Any Road". The song is a slide guitar instrumental and named after Raga Marwa, an Indian classical raga traditionally played at sunset. "Marwa Blues" won the 2004 Grammy Award for Best Pop Instrumental Performance. Along with "Any Road" and the Brainwashed track "Rising Sun", it was also included on the 2009 compilation album Let It Roll: Songs by George Harrison.

Raga Marwa was one of Harrison's favourite ragas, having become familiar to him through interpretations by Ravi Shankar and Ali Akbar Khan. In the Indian tradition, the piece is renowned for its ability to invoke a melancholic mood at sunset. Harrison recorded "Marwa Blues" as a tribute to the raga and in acknowledgement of the importance of Indian music in his life.

The track includes Harrison's slide guitar parts and keyboard accompaniment. As described by Peter Lavezzoli in his book The Dawn of Indian Music in the West: "Along with its Hawaiian flavor, the melody sounds as if it could have been played by a sarod or vina, and is yet another demonstration of Harrison's unique slide approach ..." Author Simon Leng calls it "the most personal and emotionally resonant guitar performance of his career" and identifies the track as the culmination of the musical and spiritual journey Harrison had begun in 1966 as a sitar student under Shankar. Leng also writes: "His playing is at once almost unbearably touching and spiritually enraptured, offering a multidimensional emotional experience."

As with most of Brainwashed, "Marwa Blues" was completed in early 2002 by Harrison's son Dhani and Jeff Lynne. The released recording includes a musical quotation from "Within You Without You", Harrison's Indian-style composition from the Beatles' 1967 album Sgt. Pepper's Lonely Hearts Club Band.

== Personnel ==
According to author Bill Harry:

- George Harrison – slide guitars, keyboards, finger cymbals
- Jeff Lynne – keyboards, acoustic guitar
- Dhani Harrison – acoustic guitar
- Ray Cooper – percussion
- Marc Mann – string arrangement and direction

== Sources ==
- Bill Harry, The George Harrison Encyclopedia, Virgin Books (London, 2003; ISBN 978-0-7535-0822-0).
- Elliot J. Huntley, Mystical One: George Harrison – After the Break-up of the Beatles, Guernica Editions (Toronto, ON, 2006; ISBN 1-55071-197-0).
- Ian Inglis, The Words and Music of George Harrison, Praeger (Santa Barbara, CA, 2010; ISBN 978-0-313-37532-3).
- Peter Lavezzoli, The Dawn of Indian Music in the West, Continuum (New York, NY, 2006; ISBN 0-8264-2819-3).
- Simon Leng, While My Guitar Gently Weeps: The Music of George Harrison, Hal Leonard (Milwaukee, WI, 2006; ISBN 1-4234-0609-5).
