= Brainwashed (George Harrison album) =

Studio album by George Harrison
- Released: 19 November 2002
- Recorded: 1988–2001
- Studios: FPSHOT, Oxfordshire; Swiss Army Studios, Switzerland; Bungalow Palace, Los Angeles
- Genres: Soft rock; rock; pop rock
- Length: 47:41
- Label: Dark Horse/EMI/Parlophone
- Producers: George Harrison; Jeff Lynne; Dhani Harrison

George Harrison chronology
Live in Japan (1992)	Brainwashed (2002)	The Dark Horse Years 1976–1992 (2004)

Singles from Brainwashed
- 1. "Any Road" Released: 12 May 2003

Brainwashed is the twelfth and final studio album by the English rock musician George Harrison. It was released posthumously on 19 November 2002, almost a year after his death at age 58, and 15 years after his previous studio album, Cloud Nine. Recordings began over a decade before Harrison's death but were repeatedly delayed. The album's overdubs were completed by his son Dhani, session drummer Jim Keltner, and longtime friend and collaborator Jeff Lynne.

Brainwashed reached the top 30 in the UK and the top 20 in the US, and received mostly favourable reviews. The album includes the singles "Stuck Inside a Cloud" and "Any Road". The instrumental "Marwa Blues" went on to receive the 2004 Grammy Award for Best Pop Instrumental Performance, while "Any Road" was nominated for Best Male Pop Vocal Performance.

== History ==
Harrison began recording the tracks that eventually were issued on Brainwashed as early as 1988 (with "Any Road" being written during the making of a video for "This Is Love" from the album Cloud Nine) and continued to do so in a sporadic manner over the next decade and a half, but mainly from July 1999 to October 2001. Progress was delayed by business problems with Harrison's former manager, Denis O'Brien, as well as his work with the Traveling Wilburys and Ravi Shankar, and by his work on The Beatles Anthology. In an interview in 1999, Harrison announced the title of his next album to be Portrait of a Leg End, and played songs entitled "Valentine", "Pisces Fish" and "Brainwashed". During the promotion for the 2001 re-release of All Things Must Pass, Harrison joked that the name of the album would be Your Planet Is Doomed – Volume One. After recuperating from being attacked in his home on 30 December 1999 by a man with paranoid schizophrenia, Harrison focused on finishing the album, simultaneously sharing his ideas for all its details (from the sound of the finished songs to the album's artwork) with his son Dhani – information that ultimately proved very valuable, as Dhani helped to complete the album after his father's death.

Harrison successfully battled throat cancer in 1997; in 2001 he underwent surgery to remove a cancerous growth from one of his lungs, and radiotherapy for lung cancer which had metastasised to his brain. Once he realised it was an irreversible situation, he worked further on the album's songs – in conjunction with Dhani and his old collaborator Jeff Lynne – for as long as possible. Harrison's final work on the album was carried out at a recording studio in Switzerland shortly before his trip to the United States for cancer treatment. On 29 November 2001, Harrison died before he could finish the project, but with a guide to completing it in the hands of his son and Lynne.

After a few months away from the project, both Lynne and Dhani returned to working on Harrison's final songs and added the appropriate instruments, as per his specifications, to the recordings. The project was so close to completion that the two used the exact timetable and session bookings that Harrison himself had originally planned.

Lynne reflected on Brainwashed in 2020: "His life was in those final songs, the things he got up to each day, like riding down the River Thames. Lots of very personal stuff. Some of them are really good. We gradually just filled them in. It was just about mixing them and making them sound like George would like them. You just had to go with your gut feeling."

"Run So Far" had previously appeared on Eric Clapton's album Journeyman (backed by Harrison), 13 years before finally being available in a version sung by its original writer. The original Clapton recording features a third verse not included here.

== Release ==
The album was issued on LP and CD. A limited-edition CD box was also released, containing a Brainwashed poster, a Dark Horse sticker, a guitar pick with George's signature on it, and a bonus DVD with a seven-minute featurette about the making of the album. The album sold respectably, reaching number 18 in the US and going gold, and number 29 in the UK, where "Any Road" became a top 40 hit single in spring 2003. A live tribute to Harrison by an assembly of his musical contemporaries, titled Concert for George, took place at London's Royal Albert Hall simultaneously with the release of the album.

=== Critical reception ===
Professional ratings
Aggregate scores
Source	Rating
Metacritic	77/100
Review scores
Source	Rating
AllMusic	4.5/5 stars
Billboard	"Spotlight"
entertainment.ie	4/5 stars
Entertainment Weekly	B+
The Guardian	3/5 stars
Los Angeles Times	3/4 stars
Music Story	4/5 stars
Now	4/5
Rolling Stone	4/5 stars
San Francisco Chronicle	4/5
Uncut	3/5 stars

Brainwashed was released on 19 November 2002 to mostly favourable reviews. At Metacritic, which assigns a normalised rating out of 100 to reviews from mainstream critics, the album scores 77, based on 16 reviews, which means "generally favorable".

Writing in Uncut, Nick Hasted described it as "the best solo record by a Beatle since McCartney's Flowers in the Dirt (1989)". Although he found that "a certain monotony creeps in towards the end", Hasted wrote that "Harrison's songs and singing represent a burst of form".

Keith Phipps of The A.V. Club concluded his review by writing: "Harrison never seemed to recognize the difference between philosophical profundities and the sound of a catchy song, and that may have been his greatest gift to the world. Brainwashed offers a fine, final reminder of that gift."

PopMatters' Gary Glauber found the album "phenomenal" and "easily ... Harrison's best solo effort since All Things Must Pass". He said it was "spiritual and uplifting in a way that serves to remind how much this undervalued Beatle will be missed" and "in turns funny, serious, philosophical, precious and ultimately enjoyable".

=== Accolades ===
In 2004, Brainwashed's "Marwa Blues" won the Grammy Award for Best Pop Instrumental Performance. The album was nominated for Best Pop Vocal Album, as well as Best Male Pop Vocal Performance (for the track "Any Road"). That same year, Harrison's former bandmate Paul McCartney named "Marwa Blues" as one of his all-time favourites. In 2009, three of the tracks from Brainwashed were included on Harrison's career-spanning compilation album, Let It Roll: Songs by George Harrison: "Any Road", "Marwa Blues" and "Rising Sun".

== Track listing ==
All songs written by George Harrison, except "Between the Devil and the Deep Blue Sea" written by Harold Arlen and Ted Koehler.

No.	Title	Length
1.	"Any Road"	3:52
2.	"P2 Vatican Blues (Last Saturday Night)"	2:38
3.	"Pisces Fish"	4:50
4.	"Looking for My Life"	3:49
5.	"Rising Sun"	5:27
6.	"Marwa Blues"	3:40
7.	"Stuck Inside a Cloud"	4:04
8.	"Run So Far"	4:05
9.	"Never Get Over You"	3:26
10.	"Between the Devil and the Deep Blue Sea"	2:34
11.	"Rocking Chair in Hawaii"	3:08
12.	"Brainwashed"	6:07
Total length:		47:41

== Personnel ==
- George Harrison – lead vocals (all tracks except 6), acoustic guitar (1, 3–5, 7–9, 11, 12), electric guitar (3, 4, 8, 9), bass guitar (3, 12), slide guitar (1, 2, 5–7, 12), Dobro (11), ukulele (2, 3, 10, 11), banjolele (1), keyboards (6, 11), backing vocals (2–5, 7–9, 11, 12)
- Jeff Lynne – bass guitar (1, 2, 4, 5, 7–9, 11), electric guitar (2, 3, 5, 7, 12), acoustic guitar (2, 4, 6, 8, 12), piano (1, 4–5, 7, 9), electric piano (2), keyboards (3, 6, 12), percussion (3), backing vocals (1, 2, 4, 12)
- Dhani Harrison – acoustic guitar (2, 4, 6, 8, 12), electric guitar (1, 3–4), Wurlitzer electric piano (5, 7), backing vocals (1, 2, 8, 12)
- Jim Keltner – drums (all tracks except 6 and 10)

Additional personnel

- Mike Moran – keyboards (3)
- Marc Mann – keyboards (3), string arrangement (5–6)
- Jools Holland – piano (10)
- Mark Flanagan – acoustic lead guitar (10)
- Joe Brown – acoustic guitar (10)
- Herbie Flowers – bass guitar (10), tuba (10)
- Ray Cooper – percussion (6), drums (10)
- Bickram Ghosh – tabla (12)
- Jon Lord – piano (12)
- Sam Brown – backing vocals (12)
- Jane Lister – harp (12)
- Isabela Borzymowska – reading from "How to Know God" (The Yoga Aphorisms of Patanjali) (12)

== Charts and certifications ==
=== Weekly charts ===
Chart (2002–03)	Peak position
Austrian Albums Chart	62
Danish Albums Chart	19
French SNEP Albums Chart	45
German Media Control Albums Chart	17
Italian Albums (FIMI)	36
Japanese Oricon Albums Chart	21
Norwegian VG-lista Albums Chart	9
Scottish Albums (Official Charts)	31
Swedish Albums Chart	18
Swiss Albums Chart	58
UK Albums Chart	29
US Billboard 200	18

=== Certifications and sales ===
Region	Certification	Certified units/sales
Canada (Music Canada)	Gold	50,000^{^}
Japan (Oricon Chart)	—	34,000
United Kingdom (BPI)	Gold	100,000^{^}
United States (RIAA)	Gold	500,000^{^}
Summaries
Worldwide	—	1,000,000
^{^} Shipments figures based on certification alone.
