= George Harrison (album) =

Studio album by George Harrison
- Released: 14 February 1979
- Recorded: April–October 1978
- Studios: FPSHOT, Oxfordshire; AIR, London
- Genres: Pop rock; folk pop
- Length: 39:58
- Label: Dark Horse
- Producers: George Harrison; Russ Titelman

George Harrison chronology
Thirty Three & ⅓ (1976)	George Harrison (1979)	Somewhere in England (1981)

Singles from George Harrison
- 1. "Blow Away" Released: 14 February 1979; 2. "Love Comes to Everyone" Released: 20 April 1979; 3. "Faster" Released: 13 July 1979

George Harrison is the eighth studio album by the English rock musician George Harrison, released on 14 February 1979. It was written and recorded through much of 1978, a period of domestic contentment for Harrison, during which he married Olivia Arias and became a father to son Dhani. Harrison wrote several of the songs in Hawaii, while the track "Faster" reflected his year away from music-making, when he and Arias attended many of the races in the 1977 Formula One season. The album also includes the hit single "Blow Away" and "Not Guilty", a song that Harrison originally recorded with the Beatles in 1968.

Harrison co-produced the album with Russ Titelman. The contributing musicians include Steve Winwood, Neil Larsen, Willie Weeks and Andy Newmark, with Eric Clapton and Gary Wright making guest appearances. The recording sessions took place at Harrison's FPSHOT studio in Oxfordshire.

Issued on Dark Horse Records, George Harrison was well-received by music critics on release. Commentators regularly cite it among Harrison's best works after his 1970 triple album All Things Must Pass. The album was remastered in 2004 as part of Harrison's Dark Horse Years 1976–1992 reissues.

== Background ==
In February 1977, George Harrison completed the promotion for Thirty Three & ⅓, his 1976 debut on his Dark Horse record label and an album that was widely viewed as a return to form after the critical disappointments of Dark Horse and Extra Texture. Rather than follow up on this success, Harrison took a sabbatical, which he described as "what the English call 'skyving'". For much of the year, he travelled with his girlfriend, Olivia Arias, and became a regular presence at motor races in the Formula 1 World Championship. As a rare artistic project during that time, Harrison assisted comedian Eric Idle in developing his Beatles satire, the Rutles, into the 1978 TV film All You Need Is Cash. After a chance meeting with representatives from Genesis Publications at a hotel near Heathrow Airport in July 1977, he also began compiling his song manuscripts for a limited edition leather-bound book, leading to his 1980 autobiography I, Me, Mine.

Before resuming songwriting for the new album, Harrison had not written a song since 1976. He said he was compelled to return to making music to satisfy requests from his friends in the Formula 1 community. He also felt a sense of duty towards Warner Bros. Records, the company that had taken up the distribution of Dark Horse in 1976, when A&M Records chose to offload the label, particularly as the Warner's executives had not pressured him for a new album throughout 1977.

Harrison said the project was informed by his contentment with how his life had progressed since Thirty Three & ⅓. In June 1977, he was granted a divorce from Pattie Boyd, who had left him for his friend Eric Clapton in 1974. Boyd's solicitor, a partner at the London firm Theodore Goddard, later remarked on the sensitivity shown by each party towards the other, and how rare this was in his experience of high-stakes divorces. Among other "profound changes" that influenced the album's creation, according to author Ian Inglis, Harrison became a father for the first time when Arias gave birth to their son, Dhani, in August 1978, three months after the death of his father, Harry Harrison.

== Songs ==
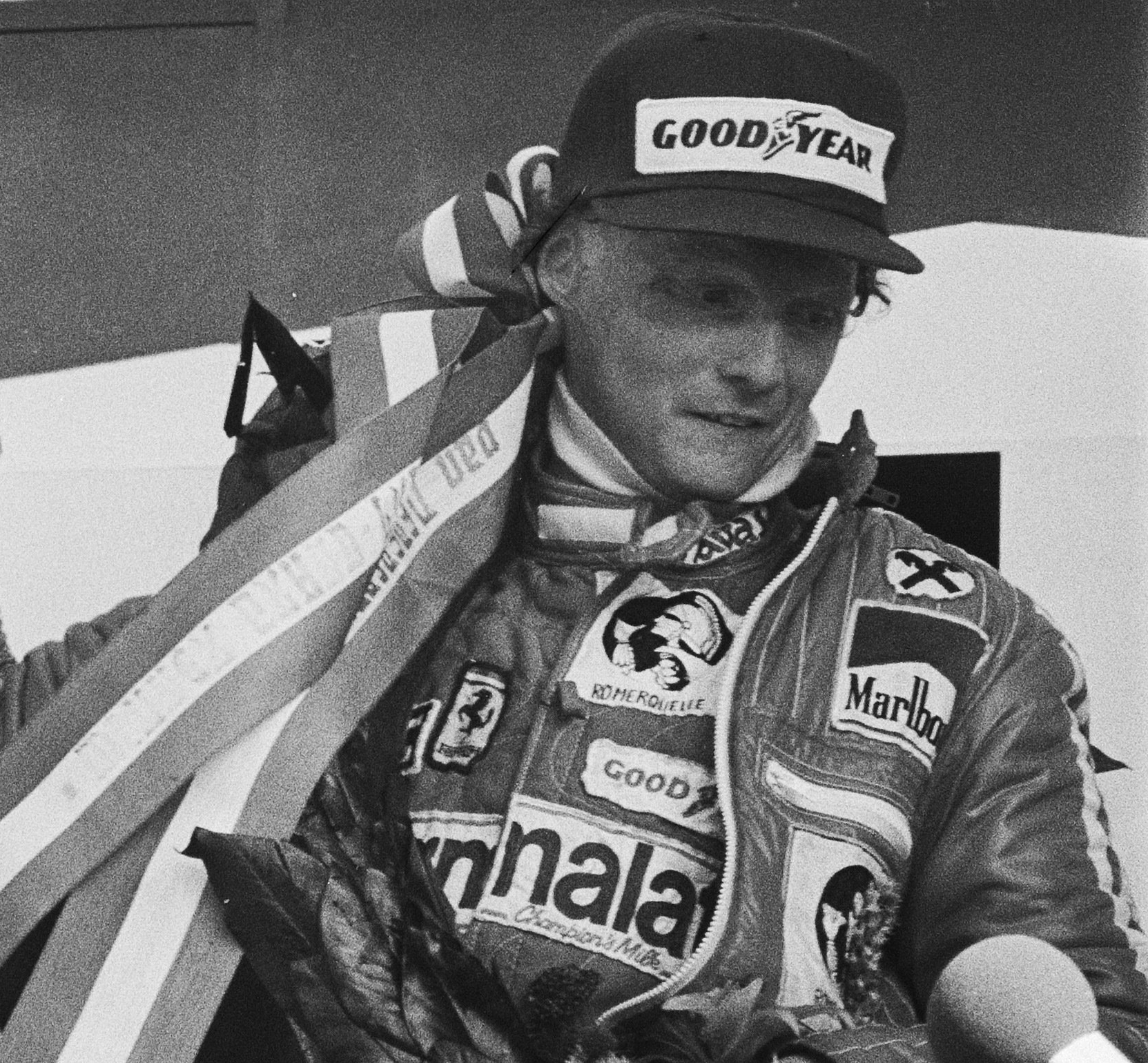
Harrison's friendship with Formula 1 world champion Niki Lauda and other drivers inspired some of the album's songs.

Harrison began writing "Love Comes to Everyone" in September 1977. It was one of several new compositions that reflected his contentment with Arias and with life generally. Author Simon Leng comments that while familiar Harrison lyrical references to Krishna and Hindu spirituality appear to be absent on George Harrison, these themes are "rife" but stated subtly; he adds, "Hence, the 'love' that comes to everyone ... is, of course, God's." "Blow Away" was initially inspired by rain damage to a roof at Harrison's Friar Park estate in Henley-on-Thames, Oxfordshire. He turned the experience into one of positive thinking, reasoning that if he sought to be optimistic by expressing love, the problem would diminish in importance. He later said that he wrote "Blow Away" as a song that Niki Lauda, Jody Scheckter, Emerson Fittipaldi and others in the F1 "gang" might enjoy. He also wrote "Faster" in late 1977, drawing inspiration from Lauda's successful comeback from a near-fatal crash at the Nürburgring the previous year. The album credits listed former driver Jackie Stewart, whose autobiography was titled Faster, as the other source of inspiration.

Harrison listened to his 1970 triple album All Things Must Pass for inspiration. He wrote "If You Believe", incorporating musical and lyrical elements familiar from All Things Must Pass, with American musician Gary Wright on New Year's Day 1978 at Friar Park. Harrison then met with Warner's staff producers Lenny Waronker, Russ Titelman and Ted Templeman in Los Angeles to discuss the new album and play them demos of his latest songs. He recalled that Templeman's appreciation of his 1971 B-side "Deep Blue" inspired him to begin writing what became "Soft-Hearted Hana".

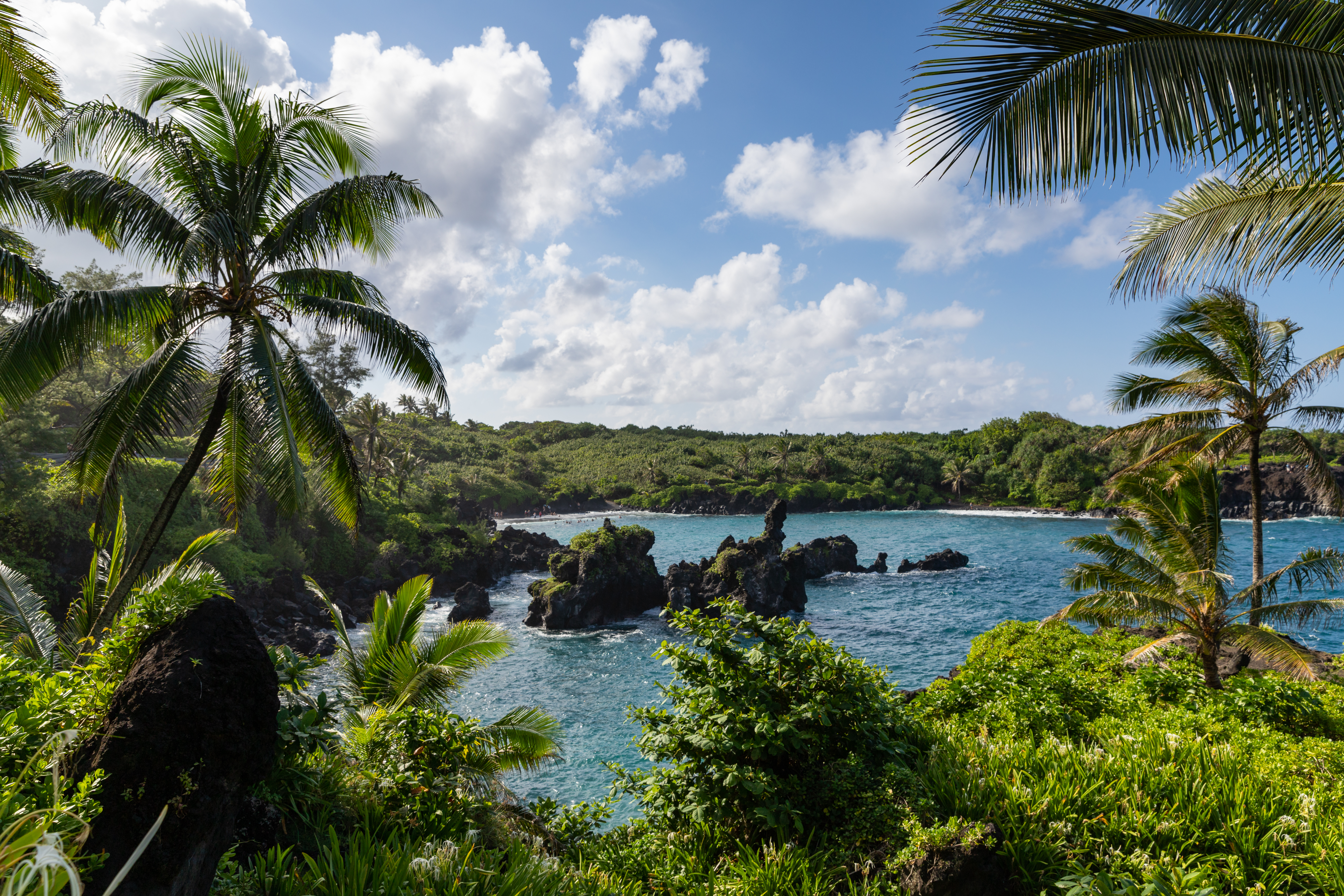
The Hawaiian island of Maui inspired further songs and the mood of George Harrison.

Harrison wrote or finished writing the album's songs while holidaying on the Hawaiian island of Maui in February 1978, soon after he and Arias learned of Arias's pregnancy. The holiday was a highly creative time for Harrison and influenced the mood of the album. He wrote "Dark Sweet Lady" there as a Spanish-style love song for Arias. (Note: Harrison said "Dark Sweet Lady" best summed up the positive effect Arias had had after the waywardness that characterised his personal life around the time of Dark Horse and his separation with Boyd.) "Your Love Is Forever" started as a guitar instrumental to which Harrison added lyrics that, furthering a common trait in his songwriting, expressed love to both a woman and his deity.

In addition to revisiting "Not Guilty", a song he had first recorded with the Beatles in 1968, Harrison wrote "Here Comes the Moon" as a lyrical successor to his 1969 Abbey Road composition "Here Comes the Sun". As with "Here Comes the Moon", his inspiration for the lyrics to "Soft-Hearted Hana" was a psychedelic mushroom experience he had on Maui. The song's title references the Tin Pan Alley standard "Hard Hearted Hannah" and the town of Hana on Maui. (Note: Harrison also wrote "Sooty Goes to Hawaii", an unreleased comedy song about Sooty, the popular glove puppet character from British television.) "Soft Touch" was a song that Harrison started writing in March 1976, while holidaying with Arias in the Virgin Islands. Harrison said the melody originated from him playing the horn line from the All Things Must Pass track "Run of the Mill" on acoustic guitar, after which he sought to convey the atmosphere around him: "the wind, the cool breeze blowing, the palm trees, the new moon rising".

== Recording ==
I think what happened between this album and the last album is that everything has been happening nice for me. My life is getting better all the time, and I'm happy, and I think that it's reflected in the music.

— George Harrison, 1979

Harrison decided to work with Titelman as his co-producer on George Harrison. The project marked the first time that Harrison had shared the producer's role on one of his albums since working with Phil Spector in the early 1970s. (Note: On Thirty Three & 1/3, he received production "assistance" from Tom Scott, but Scott had been unable to commit to a full co-producer's role.) While in Los Angeles in mid March, Harrison filmed his role as the narrator in Ringo Starr's TV special Ringo, a modern-day adaptation of Mark Twain's The Prince and the Pauper. He and Arias returned to England on 4 April and recording for the album began at Harrison's home studio, FPSHOT, later that month. Although the album credits list only FPSHOT, Titelman has said that they first recorded "Dark Sweet Lady" at Amigos Studios in Los Angeles. In a 1996 interview, Titelman recalled that he initially had to get past his awe of Harrison, as an ex-Beatle, and that while making the album he came to appreciate the precision and craft Harrison had applied to the band's music, and the "unique" quality of his guitar styles and sounds. He recognised Harrison's "fluid approach" in the guitar parts on "Dark Sweet Lady", "Love Comes to Everyone" and "Blow Away" as a legacy of his immersion in Indian music.

Among the first songs recorded at FPSHOT, on 11 April, was "Flying Hour", although it did not appear on the album. Another outtake was "Circles", a song that Harrison wrote in 1968. The core group of musicians on the album included keyboard player Neil Larsen, who had recently worked on Titelman's production of Rickie Lee Jones' self-titled debut album, and Harrison's rhythm section from his 1974 North American tour, Andy Newmark and Willie Weeks. Newmark recalled a far "mellower" Harrison in 1978, compared with his demeanour during the sessions for Dark Horse. Steve Winwood also contributed, on keyboards and backing vocals, and Ray Cooper played percussion. Leng says that the participation of these two English musicians reflected the apparent waning of American musical influences on Harrison, as suggested by the minimal presence of horns, previously a staple of the artist's sound since 1970. Special guests at the sessions included Gary Wright (on "If You Believe") and Eric Clapton, who contributed the lead guitar intro to "Love Comes to Everyone". (Note: Wright thereby became the only musician to have appeared on all of Harrison's post-Beatles solo albums.) In September, a month after the birth of their son, Harrison and Arias were married in a private ceremony in Henley. (Note: Harrison later joked that "It's the first time I've done a birth, a marriage and a death during making a record.")

In Leng's description, the album departs further from Harrison's recent works through its preference for both warm acoustic-based guitar arrangements and using electric guitars as "smooth, ringing purveyors of elegance". In the latter regard, he views the selection of "Love Comes to Everyone" to open the album as a statement declaring: "This is not a rock 'n' roll record." Inglis writes that, furthering the approach introduced on Thirty Three & ⅓, the arrangements convey a "less aggressive, more subtle, musical philosophy that saw music and words as complementary rather than competing ingredients"; he cites "Soft Touch" as especially indicative of this trait. Harrison augmented the rag-time atmosphere of "Soft-Hearted Hana" with sounds and conversation captured at his local Henley pub, The Row Barge. At the end of the track, the recording was subjected to heavy varispeeding, creating dramatic changes in pitch; Leng views the song as the first example of Harrison evoking Monty Python in his music. (Note: Leng recognises "the culmination of the Pythonization of Harrison's music" as the 1981 track "Save the World", a song that Harrison wrote in Hana in February 1978.) He added Formula 1 sounds throughout "Faster"; the track opens with the cars revving up and then starting the race. String and horn overdubs were added to some of the songs at London's AIR Studios in late 1978.

The new album was originally titled Faster after Harrison's F1 tribute song. The album was scheduled for release in December but an issue with the artwork delayed the process. On 7 December, Harrison joined Clapton and Elton John on stage at Guildford Civic Hall to play the encore at the final show of Clapton's UK tour. That same month, he performed with Bad Company's Mick Ralphs, Simon Kirke and Boz Burrell, and Deep Purple members Jon Lord and Ian Paice – as the Pisshole Artists – in the Oxfordshire village of Pishill, near Henley. (Note: These performances followed a year after Harrison played an impromptu set at The Row Barge. The latter was Harrison's first live performance in three years and his first in the UK since 1969, when he played with John Lennon's Plastic Ono Band.)

== Artwork and music videos ==
The album design was by Mike Salisbury, who also took the front and back cover photos of Harrison in the gardens at Friar Park. The setting emphasised Harrison's connection with nature, as conveyed in "Blow Away" and further to his self-identification as a "gardener" more than a musician. The LP's inner sleeve highlighted his affinity with Formula 1. One side contained the lyrics of "Faster", along with the album credits, beside a photo of Harrison and Stewart taken in July 1978 at the British Grand Prix at Brands Hatch. In addition to acknowledging Stewart and Lauda's inspiration, a caption under the song's lyrics gave "special thanks" to Scheckter and dedicated "Faster" to the memory of Ronnie Peterson, who had died as a result of an accident at the start of the 1978 Italian Grand Prix. (Note: As with the songs' lyrical content, the overt Hindu imagery familiar from most of Harrison's 1970s albums was minimal in the LP design. The words "Hare Krishna" were printed under the inner-sleeve photo of the Brands Hatch infield.)

Harrison filmed a music video for the album's lead single, "Blow Away". It shows him miming to the song while interacting with giant replica animals such as a red duck and a swan. He also rides atop a large replica dog, who nods its head along with the music.

In May 1979, three months after the release of the album, Harrison filmed a video for "Faster". Having attended the Monaco Grand Prix with Starr at this time, Harrison filmed part of the clip on the Monaco street circuit. These portions show Stewart chauffeuring a road car around the racetrack as Harrison sings and plays guitar in the back seat.

== Release ==
The album was previewed by the single "Blow Away", which was released on 14 February 1979 in the United States and two days later in the United Kingdom. George Harrison was issued on Dark Horse Records on 14 February in the US, with the UK release following on 23 February. Shortly before its release, he, Arias and Wright attended the Brazilian Grand Prix in São Paulo. As the first Beatle to have visited Brazil, Harrison was the subject of considerable media attention. He corrected a journalist's assumption that the whole LP was about motor racing, saying that only "Faster" was, although he added that the lyrics were suitably "abstract" and "could be about anyone ... not just about cars and engines".

=== Promotion ===
Harrison reacting to questions about a possible Beatles reunion, at his Los Angeles press conference; photo: Brich/The Associated Press

Harrison did minimal promotion for the album. A plan for him to perform a radio concert in April was under consideration but soon abandoned. In early February, Harrison appeared with Michael Jackson as a guest singles reviewer on BBC Radio 1's Roundtable, during which he discussed his year away from music and writing "Blow Away" and "Here Comes the Moon". He then appeared in a brief interview segment conducted by Nicky Horne for ITV's Thames at Six news programme, and as a guest on Horne's Capital Radio show Your Mother Wouldn't Like It. Later in February, he sat for an interview at Warner's London offices with Mick Brown, for Rolling Stone.

Following an accident at Friar Park when a tractor drove over his foot, Harrison required a walking stick during his brief promotional visit to the US. He made fun of his predicament by using a wheelchair when departing from Heathrow. On 8 March, at the Dark Horse Records offices in Los Angeles, Harrison gave his first US press conference since the start of his 1974 tour. In journalist Rip Rense's later description, he was "promptly surrounded – and almost suffocated" by the reporters as microphones were thrust in his face. (Note: Rense recalled Harrison being more interested in why the reporters were not enjoying the free scones and expressed a wish that someone would help him quit smoking.) Harrison's lightheartedness extended to the usual questions about when the Beatles might re-form; the Associated Press photo from the event showed him holding his hands up to his ears in response. Dismissing the recent multi-million-dollar offers for a reunion concert, he said, "The Beatles can't save the world. I mean, we'll be lucky if we can save ourselves." When a reporter asked whether "something less than a full reunion" was likely, Harrison suggested they could meet for a cup of tea and televise the proceedings via satellite. He added that he and his former bandmates would have a "great time" together, and "the only thing that would spoil it would be all of you with the cameras and microphones!"

=== Commercial performance and aftermath ===
In the US, "Blow Away" peaked at number 16 on the Billboard Hot 100 and number 2 on Billboard's Adult Contemporary chart, while George Harrison reached number 14 on the magazine's Top LPs & Tape chart and number 12 on Cash Box's Top 100 Albums. The album was certified gold by the Recording Industry Association of America. Harrison's unwillingness to actively promote the record hindered its commercial performance in the UK. There, "Blow Away" peaked at number 51 and George Harrison reached number 39. As a further impediment, according to author Elliot Huntley, the UK's fascination with new wave music meant that "interest in Beatle product was probably at an all time low". "Blow Away" was especially successful in Canada, where it peaked at number 7 on the singles chart.

Following the album's release, Harrison's efforts were increasingly directed towards the film industry, after he had formed HandMade Films in order to help Idle and the other members of Monty Python complete Life of Brian. In April, "Love Comes to Everyone" was issued as the album's second single. It failed to chart in the UK and, despite having been a popular choice on radio as an album track, in the US. The following month, Harrison, Starr and Paul McCartney performed together on stage at Clapton and Boyd's wedding reception in Surrey. In Huntley's description, it was a historic moment and "the closest the former Beatles had come to a live performance since the break-up".

Harrison participated in two fundraising weekends to benefit the cancer research project set up by former F1 driver Gunnar Nilsson before his death from cancer late the previous year. In the second of these, in early June, he drove Stirling Moss's Lotus 18 from the early 1960s around the Donington Park circuit. In July, "Faster" was released as a charity single in the UK, to raise further funds for Nilsson's cause. (Note: At the end of July, Harrison and Stewart appeared on the cover of Motor magazine. In the accompanying article about the Donington Park event, Harrison rued that he had become "too well known at motor races now" and that it was "getting like work again", since he was regularly besieged by autograph hunters.)

In 2004, George Harrison was remastered and reissued both separately and as part of the deluxe box set The Dark Horse Years 1976–1992. The reissue added a demo version of "Here Comes the Moon" as a bonus track. Following the digital release of much of his catalogue in 2007, Harrison's demo of "Blow Away" became available as an iTunes-exclusive download.

== Critical reception ==
=== Contemporary reviews ===
George Harrison received favourable reviews from music critics. During his interview with Harrison, Mick Brown said the critical reception had been "exceptionally good" in the UK and suggested that the new album was the artist's best since All Things Must Pass, a contention that several critics supported. (Note: Harrison replied: "Well, I hope it does as well as All Things Must Pass. I think this album is very pleasant.") Billboard featured George Harrison as its "Spotlight" album (meaning "the most outstanding new product of the week's releases") and highlighted "Love Comes to Everyone", "Here Comes the Moon" and "Not Guilty" among the "best cuts".

Rolling Stone's album reviewer, Stephen Holden, deemed it "refreshingly light-hearted" and wrote: "After several highly uneven LPs that saw the audience for his mystic musings dwindle dramatically, Harrison has come up with his finest record since All Things Must Pass. A collection of ten catchy pop songs, George Harrison reminds us that this artist was always a much better tunesmith than priest." Writing in Melody Maker, E.J. Thribb said it was an album that "grows in its effect" and highlighted "Love Comes to Everyone", "Blow Away" and "Not Guilty" as songs in which "the chords roll and tumble, the melodies are good to chant, and the lyrics are simple but tell their story." (Note: While also approving of Harrison's lightheartedness on the album, Thribb concluded that he had "brought both sunshine and moonshine into our lives".) Harry George of the NME likened George Harrison to Bob Dylan's New Morning and Van Morrison's Tupelo Honey and said that Harrison's "guileless romanticism surprisingly carries the album". He recognised "Faster" and "Not Guilty" as examples of Harrison's growth as a songwriter, and identified "melodies of unassuming completeness" in other tracks where "Crafty harmonies and skilfully-layered guitars recall the sun-soaked vistas of [the Beatles]' 'Because' and 'Sun King' on Abbey Road."

Bob Spitz of The Washington Post praised the album for its "sense of structure", a quality he found lacking in Harrison's four "dreadful" LPs since All Things Must Pass, and said that it re-established him as a "first-rate composer". Less impressed, People's reviewer found the music "arch-Harrison: lyrically cheery and thematically uplifting" but "so restrained and subdued that the tunes track through a whole side unnoticed and indistinguishable". Robert Christgau was more critical in Christgau's Record Guide: Rock Albums of the Seventies (1981), giving it a "C" grade and singling out "Faster" as the record's only good song.

According to authors Chip Madinger and Mark Easter, further to the welcome "lightening up" evident on Thirty Three & ⅓ in 1976, Harrison's self-titled album completed his "musical rehabilitation". Writing in 1981, NME critic Bob Woffinden opined: "George Harrison is his most successful album since All Things Must Pass, and would probably have sold in its millions had it arrived at the beginning rather than the end of the decade." Woffinden praised Harrison's songwriting and the "co-production arrangement" with Titelman, before describing the record as "one of the best Beatle solo efforts". In their review in the 1981 edition of The Beatles: An Illustrated Record, Roy Carr and Tony Tyler welcomed Harrison's continued avoidance of the "half-baked proselytisation" that they thought had marred his solo work until 1976, saying that it showed he had shed his past insecurities. The authors added: "To detect this pleasing phenomenon here, the trick is to back away from the musical and lyrical detail (not that this is by any means incompetent or jarring) and allow the totality of the sound ... to wash over one in a series of charmed ripples." (Note: By the early 1980s, according to Alan Clayson, "[George Harrison] was coming to be regarded as the Serious Beatle's most compelling solo collection.")

=== Retrospective assessments and legacy ===
George Harrison actually signaled the start of the musician's retreat into an internal musical dialogue, set amid the woods and gardens of Friar Park. It was the return to nature predicted by "All Things Must Pass" and "Let It Roll" ... The album was also his growing-up set ... from a period in which he'd rediscovered life away from the business for the first time in nearly twenty years.

— Author Simon Leng, 2006

Following Harrison's death in November 2001, Carol Clerk of Uncut referred to his 1979 LP as the "acclaimed George Harrison album", while Greg Kot's assessment for Rolling Stone read in part: "'Here Comes the Moon' is a dreamy little wonder, the kind of incantation that underscores the [album's] romantic subtlety … Harrison is breezingly ingratiating on 'Blow Away' and 'Faster.'" Writing for Goldmine magazine in 2002, Dave Thompson deemed it Harrison's "most natural-sounding album" since All Things Must Pass and an "exquisite" work that reflected changes in the artist's life as profound as those in John Lennon's during the latter's five-year hiatus from recording between 1975 and 1980.

Among reviews of the 2004 reissue, Kit Aiken of Uncut gave George Harrison a rating of four stars out of five, and described it as "a freshly enthused, minor treat – a fulsome acoustic rocker replete with sunshine melodies and gorgeous slide guitar". PopMatters' Jason Korenkiewicz similarly welcomed the reissue, saying that the album's "languid and addictive" mood conveyed Harrison's humour and a "new found sense of calm and peace that speaks through his ever-emotive guitar". Writing in The Rolling Stone Album Guide that same year, Mac Randall highlighted "Not Guilty" and the "understated gem" "Your Love Is Forever" as the album's best songs, but considered that "elsewhere mellowness overwhelms musicality". An unimpressed Richard Ginell of AllMusic gives the album two-and-a-half stars, describing it as "a painstakingly polished L.A.-made product" and "an ordinary album from an extraordinary talent". Ginell writes of the preponderance of "halfhearted songs lurking here, although some are salvaged by a nice instrumental touch", and while he considers "Blow Away" the album's "most attractive" song, he finds Harrison's new reading of "Not Guilty" "an easy listening trifle".

Reviewing Harrison's solo releases for Mojo in 2011, John Harris considered George Harrison to be "millionaire soft-rock to the max" although he recognised "Here Comes the Moon", "Faster" and "Not Guilty" among the album's successful musical statements. In a similar overview of Harrison's solo career, on his website Elsewhere, New Zealand Herald critic Graham Reid wrote that the album "has its moments" and concluded: "He still crafted beautiful melodies but it's a lyrically patchy album and the start of the artistic decline. A sound three stars."

On the occasion of the LP's 40th anniversary in 2019, Morgan Enos of Billboard described it as Harrison's "most peaceful album", with songs that showed him "happier than he'd been in years", and where "inner tranquility and outer splendor were one and the same". Enos added that "The results don't get as much play as agreed-upon classics, such as All Things Must Pass or Cloud Nine, but George Harrison conjures an intoxicating world all its own." In 2022, Listeverse ranked it as one of the guitarist's best works, stating that the record "proved the blueprint for his 1980’s output, a body of work where 'Your Love Is Forever' and 'Here Comes The Moon' could sit happily between."

== Track listing ==
All songs written by George Harrison, except where noted.

Side one

1. "Love Comes to Everyone" – 4:36
2. "Not Guilty" – 3:35
3. "Here Comes the Moon" – 4:48
4. "Soft-Hearted Hana" – 4:03
5. "Blow Away" – 4:00

Side two

1. "Faster" – 4:46
2. "Dark Sweet Lady" – 3:22
3. "Your Love Is Forever" – 3:45
4. "Soft Touch" – 3:59
5. "If You Believe" (Harrison, Gary Wright) – 2:55

Bonus tracks

The 2004 Dark Horse Years issue of George Harrison added the following bonus track:

11. "Here Comes the Moon" (demo version) – 3:37

One more bonus track was added to the album when Harrison's catalogue became available on iTunes:

12. "Blow Away" (demo version) – 3:04

== Personnel ==
According to the album credits (except where noted):

- George Harrison – lead and backing vocals, electric and acoustic guitars, dobro, mandolin, sitar ; bass on "Faster"
- Neil Larsen – Fender Rhodes, piano, Minimoog, Hammond organ
- Steve Winwood – Polymoog, harmonium, Minimoog, backing vocals
- Willie Weeks – bass guitar
- Andy Newmark – drums
- Ray Cooper – percussion
- Emil Richards – marimba
- Gayle Levant – harp
- Eric Clapton – guitar intro on "Love Comes to Everyone"
- Gary Wright – Oberheim on "If You Believe"
- Del Newman – string and horn arrangements

== Charts ==
=== Weekly charts ===
Chart (1979)	Peak position
Australia (Kent Music Report)	52
Canadian 100 Albums (RPM)	14
Dutch Albums (MegaCharts)	39
Japanese LPs (Oricon)	31
Norwegian Albums (VG-lista)	21
UK Albums	39
US Billboard Top LPs & Tape	14
US Cash Box Top 100 Albums	12

=== Year-end charts ===
Chart (1979)	Position
Canadian Albums (RPM)	76

== Certifications ==
Region	Certification
United States (RIAA)	Gold

== Sources ==
- Allison Jr, Dale C. (2006), The Love There That's Sleeping: The Art and Spirituality of George Harrison, New York, NY: Continuum, ISBN 978-0-8264-1917-0.
- Badman, Keith (2001), The Beatles Diary Volume 2: After the Break-Up 1970–2001, London: Omnibus Press, ISBN 0-7119-8307-0.
- Brackett, Nathan; Hoard, Christian, eds. (2004), The New Rolling Stone Album Guide (4th ed.), New York, NY: Fireside/Simon & Schuster, ISBN 0-7432-0169-8.
- Carr, Roy; Tyler, Tony (1978), The Beatles: An Illustrated Record, London: Trewin Copplestone Publishing, ISBN 0-450-04170-0.
- Clayson, Alan (2003), George Harrison, London: Sanctuary, ISBN 1-86074-489-3.
- Doggett, Peter (2011), You Never Give Me Your Money: The Beatles After the Breakup, New York, NY: It Books, ISBN 978-0-06-177418-8.
- The Editors of Rolling Stone (2002), Harrison, New York, NY: Rolling Stone Press/Simon & Schuster, ISBN 0-7432-3581-9.
- Frontani, Michael (2009), "The Solo Years", in Kenneth Womack (ed.), The Cambridge Companion to the Beatles, Cambridge, UK: Cambridge University Press, ISBN 978-1-139-82806-2, pp. 153–82.
- Greene, Joshua M. (2006). Here Comes the Sun: The Spiritual and Musical Journey of George Harrison. Hoboken, NJ: John Wiley & Sons. ISBN 978-0-470-12780-3..
- Harrison, George (2017), I Me Mine, with Derek Taylor & Olivia Harrison (Extended ed.), Guildford, UK: Genesis Publications, ISBN 978-1-905662-40-1.
- Harry, Bill (2003), The George Harrison Encyclopedia, London: Virgin Books, ISBN 978-0-7535-0822-0.
- Hertsgaard, Mark (1996). A Day in the Life: The Music and Artistry of the Beatles. London: Pan Books. ISBN 0-330-33891-9..
- Huntley, Elliot J. (2006), Mystical One: George Harrison – After the Break-up of the Beatles, Toronto, ON: Guernica Editions, ISBN 1-55071-197-0.
- Inglis, Ian (2010), The Words and Music of George Harrison, Santa Barbara, CA: Praeger, ISBN 978-0-313-37532-3.
- Kahn, Ashley, ed. (2020), George Harrison on George Harrison: Interviews and Encounters, Chicago, IL: Chicago Review Press, ISBN 978-1-64160-051-4.
- Leng, Simon (2006), While My Guitar Gently Weeps: The Music of George Harrison, Milwaukee, WI: Hal Leonard, ISBN 1-4234-0609-5.
- MacFarlane, Thomas (2019), The Music of George Harrison, Abingdon, UK: Routledge, ISBN 978-1-138-59910-9.
- Madinger, Chip; Easter, Mark (2000), Eight Arms to Hold You: The Solo Beatles Compendium, Chesterfield, MO: 44.1 Productions, ISBN 0-615-11724-4.
- Jörg Pieper, The Solo Beatles Film & TV Chronicle 1971–1980, Premium Förlag (Stockholm, 2012; ISBN 978-1-4092-8301-0).
- Rodriguez, Robert (2010), Fab Four FAQ 2.0: The Beatles' Solo Years 1970–1980, Milwaukee, WI: Hal Leonard, ISBN 978-0-87930-968-8.
- Snow, Mat (November 2014), "George Harrison: Quiet Storm", Mojo, pp. 66–73.
- Tillery, Gary (2011), Working Class Mystic: A Spiritual Biography of George Harrison, Wheaton, IL: Quest Books, ISBN 978-0-8356-0900-5.
- Woffinden, Bob (1981), The Beatles Apart, London: Proteus, ISBN 0-906071-89-5.
- Wyman, Bill (2002), Rolling with the Stones, London: Dorling Kindersley, ISBN 0-7513-4646-2.
