= When We Was Fab =

- UK picture sleeve

Single by George Harrison

from the album Cloud Nine
- B-side: "Zig Zag"; "That's the Way It Goes (remix)" (12" and CD only); "When We Was Fab (reverse end)" (12" and CD only)
- Released: 25 January 1988
- Recorded: 1987
- Studio: FPSHOT (Oxfordshire)
- Genre: Psychedelic rock
- Length: 3:59
- Label: Dark Horse
- Songwriters: George Harrison; Jeff Lynne
- Producers: Jeff Lynne; George Harrison

George Harrison singles chronology
"Got My Mind Set on You" (1987)	"When We Was Fab" (1988)	"This Is Love" (1988)

Picture disc
- 12" (W8131TP)

Music video
- "When We Was Fab" on YouTube

"When We Was Fab" is a song by the English musician George Harrison, which he released on his eleventh studio album Cloud Nine (1987). It was also issued as the second single from the album, in January 1988. The lyrics serve as a nostalgic reflection by Harrison on the days of Beatlemania during the 1960s, when the Beatles were first referred to as "the Fab Four". Harrison co-wrote the song with Jeff Lynne, who also co-produced the track. The recording references the psychedelic sound that the Beatles had helped popularise in 1967, through its use of sitar, cello, and backwards-relayed effects. Harrison's former Beatles bandmate Ringo Starr is among the other musicians on the track. The single was accompanied by an innovative music video, directed by the partnership of Kevin Godley and Lol Creme. One of Harrison's most popular songs, "When We Was Fab" has appeared on the compilations Best of Dark Horse 1976–1989 (1989) and Let It Roll (2009).

== Music ==
"When We Was Fab" has similarities to songs by the Beatles, such as "I Am the Walrus" (1967) and "The Continuing Story of Bungalow Bill" (1968). The fadeout contains a nod to the melody of "Drive My Car". It uses a string quartet and psychedelic effects as did many Beatles songs. The lyrics reference, among other things, "You Really Got a Hold On Me", "Within You Without You", and the Bob Dylan song "It's All Over Now, Baby Blue".

== Release ==
In the United Kingdom, it peaked at number 25 on the UK Singles Chart, and in the United States, the song peaked at number 23 on Billboard magazine's Hot 100 chart. It was Harrison's last top 40 hit in the US, and the second such hit in which the lyrics reflect on his years as a Beatle – the other being "All Those Years Ago" (1981).

Cash Box said that "Harrison and Jeff Lynne unveil a historical re-creation of the Beatles' career wrapped up in one song. Complete with cellos, George Martin-like edits, sitars, and time machine. Sounds like a Beatles song circa Magical Mystery Tour."

In 2010, AOL radio listeners chose "When We Was Fab" as one of the 10 Best George Harrison Songs, placing it number 9 on the list.

== Track listings ==
All songs written by George Harrison and Jeff Lynne except "That's the Way It Goes" written by Harrison

- 7" W8131
1. "When We Was Fab" – 3:59
2. "Zig Zag" – 2:45
- 12" W8131T, 12" picture disc W8131TP, 3" CD W8131CD
1. "When We Was Fab" (unextended version) – 3:57
2. "Zig Zag" – 2:45
3. "That's the Way It Goes" (remix) – 3:31
4. "When We Was Fab" (reverse end) – 5:17

== Cover art ==
The single cover incorporates Klaus Voormann's 1966 line drawing of Harrison, which was used in the album art for the Beatles' 1966 album Revolver, and on which the letters ER from the title are visible, along with a similar, updated drawing of Harrison 22 years later, again by Voormann.

"George said, ‘I have a song it’s reminiscing about the old days. Can you do a cover?’ I took the same picture from the Revolver cover, the old George, and put a new George on the bottom." – Klaus Voormann, Uncut, May 2020

== Music video ==
The music video that accompanied the song was directed by Godley & Creme and filmed at Greenford Studios in Greenford, London, UK on 18 December 1987. It features a many-armed Harrison busking in front of a brick wall, as numerous people on the street pass him by, including many British musicians with whom Harrison had previously collaborated. Most prominent amongst these are Ringo Starr, who appears first as Harrison's roadie and then as a drummer, and Jeff Lynne, both of whom also played on the track. Elton John makes an appearance, putting a coin in Harrison's cup, as does percussionist Ray Cooper, and Neil Aspinall, the Beatles' former road manager, assistant, and later head of Apple Corps, holding a copy of John Lennon's 1971 Imagine album. Paul McCartney was for a long time rumoured to have appeared in the walrus suit, playing the bass, after Harrison stated in a televised interview that it was indeed McCartney in the video, "but he was camera shy that day and he kept his walrus mask on." The bassist in the video is playing left handed, thus implying that it is at least intended as a reference to McCartney; however, in a 1995 interview, McCartney said, "George wanted me to be in it but I wasn't available. So I suggested that he put someone else in the walrus and tell everyone that it was me." Though Paul Simon has been rumoured to be the figure pushing a cart, in 2020 director Kevin Godley told the Nothing Is Real podcast he had no recollection of Simon being involved.

The video includes numerous visual metaphors and references to Harrison's time with the Beatles, including a green apple (the logo of Apple Records, the Beatles' label), Harrison wearing his distinctive outfit from the cover of Sgt. Pepper's Lonely Hearts Club Band, and having multiple arms, evoking the many-armed gods of Hindu traditions.

The video received six nominations at the 1988 MTV Video Music Awards, including best art director for Sid Bartholomew.

== Personnel ==
- George Harrison – lead vocals, acoustic and electric guitars, keyboards, sitar, backing vocals
- Jeff Lynne – bass guitar, keyboards, backing vocals
- Gary Wright – piano
- Ringo Starr – drums, backing vocals
- Bobby Kok – cello

== Chart performance ==
Chart (1988)	Peak position
Australia	35
Belgian Ultratop Singles (Flanders)	38
Canadian RPM 100	20
Canada RPM Adult Contemporary	7
Dutch MegaChart Singles	52
Irish Singles Chart	24
UK Singles Chart	25
US Billboard Hot 100	23
US Adult Contemporary (Billboard)	10
US Mainstream Rock (Billboard)	2
West German Media Control Singles	40
