= This Is Love (George Harrison song) =

- UK picture sleeve

Single by George Harrison

from the album Cloud Nine
- B-side: "Breath Away from Heaven"
- Released: June 13, 1988
- Recorded: 1987
- Studio: FPSHOT (Oxfordshire)
- Genre: Rock
- Length: 3:49
- Label: Dark Horse
- Songwriters: George Harrison, Jeff Lynne
- Producers: Jeff Lynne, George Harrison

George Harrison singles chronology
"When We Was Fab" (1988)	"This Is Love" (1988)	"Cheer Down" (1989)

"This Is Love" is a song by the English rock musician George Harrison that was released on his eleventh studio album Cloud Nine (1987). Harrison co-wrote the song with Jeff Lynne, who also co-produced the track. In June 1988, it was issued as the third single from Cloud Nine, peaking at number 55 on the UK singles chart.

The original B-side for the single was going to be "Handle with Care", a collaboration between Harrison, Lynne, Roy Orbison and Tom Petty recorded at Bob Dylan's studio in Santa Monica, California. When executives at Harrison's distributor Warner Bros. Records heard the track, they decided it was too good to be released as single "filler", a decision that resulted in the formation of the Traveling Wilburys, and the album Traveling Wilburys Vol. 1, with "Handle with Care" as the lead track and single.

Steve Wood and Daniel May composed music to the 1998 IMAX documentary film Everest incorporating melodies from some of Harrison's songs, one of which was "This Is Love". Harrison's Cloud Nine recording also appeared on his third compilation album Let It Roll: Songs by George Harrison (2009).

== Critical reception ==
Cashbox called it a "terrifically hooky little tune for George and co-writer/producer Jeff Lynne to shine on" and praised the song's dynamics.

== Promotional video ==
In March 1988, Harrison filmed a promotional video for "This Is Love" in Hana, on the Hawaiian island of Maui, where he had a holiday property. It was directed by Rocky Morton and Annabel Jankel and production was credited to the A+R Group.

The clip begins with various shots of a tropical beach. It then cuts to Harrison playing his guitar and singing the song while standing on a rocky shore surrounded by breaking waves. The camera moves in for a close up of Harrison's face as he sings and a shot of the guitar strings. The scene behind him changes back and forth from tropical vegetation to the rocky shore as he continues to sing and play. He throws up the guitar and catches it. The scene changes to a family picnic where Harrison is welcomed while the song continues to play. Among other people, the picnic sequence shows Harrison's wife, Olivia, and her father, playing a violin. The scenes shift again, and finally Harrison picks up his guitar and walks away. The video ends with a shot of him and the guitar against a tropical landscape.

The film was rarely shown at the time, but in 2004 it appeared on Harrison's Dark Horse Years 1976–1992 DVD, which was available as part of the similarly titled box set and as a standalone release. In his review of the box set, for The Guardian, James Griffiths admired the videos for challenging Harrison's reputation as a musician disinterested in pop stardom and said that, in "This Is Love", "he comes on like a denim-clad, late 80s MTV rock god, posing on a rocky outcrop while the sea lashes around him."

== Personnel ==
- George Harrison – lead and backing vocals, lead and slide guitar
- Jeff Lynne – rhythm and bass guitar, keyboards, backing vocals
- Jim Keltner – drums
- Ray Cooper – tambourine

== Track listings ==
1. "This Is Love"
2. "Breath Away from Heaven"
3. "All Those Years Ago" (12" and CD only)
4. "Hong Kong Blues" (CD only)

== Charts ==
Chart (1988)	Peak position
European Airplay (Music & Media)	41
UK Singles (Official Charts)	55
