= Stuck Inside a Cloud =

- US picture sleeve

Promotional single by George Harrison

from the album Brainwashed
- Released: 2002
- Recorded: 1990s
- Genre: Rock
- Length: 4:04
- Label: Parlophone, Dark Horse; Capitol
- Songwriter: George Harrison
- Producers: George Harrison, Jeff Lynne, Dhani Harrison

George Harrison singles chronology
"My Sweet Lord" (2002)	"Stuck Inside a Cloud" (2002)	"Any Road" (2003)

"Stuck Inside a Cloud" is a song by George Harrison and is the seventh track on his posthumous album Brainwashed. It was released to radio stations in the United States and the United Kingdom in 2002, peaking at number 27 on Billboard's Adult Contemporary chart in the US in 2003, and peaking at number 15 on Billboard's Adult Alternative Airplay charts in 2003.

== Track listing ==
- Promo CD GEORGE1 (UK), DPRO-17572 (U.S.)
1. "Stuck Inside a Cloud"

== Personnel ==
- George Harrison – lead and backing vocals, acoustic guitar, slide guitar
- Jeff Lynne – bass guitar, electric guitar, piano
- Dhani Harrison – Wurlitzer electric piano
- Jim Keltner – drums
