= Got My Mind Set on You =

1962 song by James Ray

"I've Got My Mind Set on You"
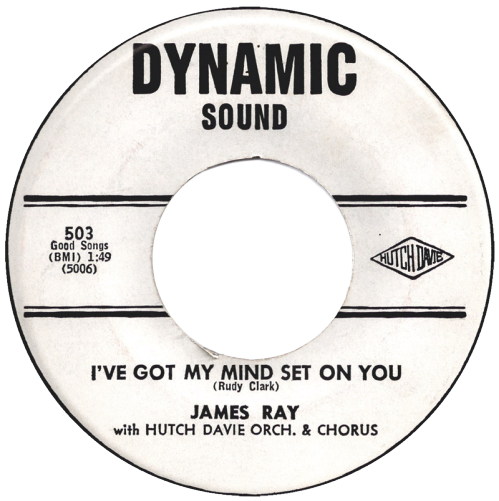
- B-side label of US single

Song by James Ray with Hutch Davie Orchestra & Chorus
- A-side: "Always"
- Released: December 8, 1962
- Recorded: 1962
- Genre: Rock; R&B; soul
- Length: 3:26
- Label: Dynamic Sound
- Songwriter: Rudy Clark
- Producer: Hutch Davie

Official audio
- "I've Got My Mind Set on You" on YouTube

"Got My Mind Set on You" (also written as "(Got My Mind) Set on You") is a song written and composed by Rudy Clark and originally recorded by James Ray in 1962, under the title "I've Got My Mind Set on You". An edited version of the song was released later in the year as a single on Dynamic Sound Records credited to Ray with Hutch Davie Orchestra & Chorus. The song features a variety of instruments, including a Chinese lute, but it is uncertain whether Ray or the orchestra played the lute. In 1987, George Harrison released a cover version of the song on his eleventh studio album Cloud Nine, which he had recorded on his Dark Horse Records label.

== George Harrison version ==
"Got My Mind Set on You"
- Standard cover art

Single by George Harrison

from the album Cloud Nine
- B-side: "Lay His Head"
- Released: October 12, 1987
- Recorded: January–August 1987
- Studio: Friar Park Studios, Henley-on-Thames, Oxfordshire
- Genre: Rock; pop rock; dance rock
- Length: 3:50; 5:17 (extended)
- Label: Dark Horse
- Songwriter: Rudy Clark
- Producers: Jeff Lynne; George Harrison

George Harrison singles chronology
"Shanghai Surprise" (1986)	"Got My Mind Set on You" (1987)	"When We Was Fab" (1988)

Music video
- "Got My Mind Set on You" ver. 1 on YouTube

Music video
- "Got My Mind Set on You" ver. 2 on YouTube

The first time Harrison heard the song was during a visit to his sister in Benton, Illinois, in the United States in 1963—five months before the Beatles first appeared on The Ed Sullivan Show. While there, Harrison visited record shops and bought a variety of albums. One was Ray's 1962 album that contained the song "I've Got My Mind Set on You". In January 1987, Harrison began recording the song at his Friar Park home studio, with Jeff Lynne producing and playing bass and keyboards, Jim Keltner on drums, Jim Horn on sax, and Ray Cooper on percussion.

It was released on October 12, 1987, in the US. Of Harrison's three number-one singles in the US, it was the only song not written or composed by Harrison himself. Not only was it the last US number-one hit by Harrison but, as of 2026, the last time a former Beatle hit number one in either the US or UK as a solo artist. When the song hit number one, it broke a three-way tie between Harrison, John Lennon, and Ringo Starr, all of whom had two number-one hit singles as solo artists in the US (Paul McCartney had three solo number-one singles and an additional six with Wings). It also happened to be the number-one single in the US the week immediately preceding the induction of the Beatles into the Rock and Roll Hall of Fame, making Harrison one of the few inductees to have an active single on the US record charts at the time of induction. Billboard ranked the song as number three for 1988.

The single's B-side is "Lay His Head", a remixed version of an unreleased song originally intended for Harrison's Somewhere in England album. The twelve-inch version of the single also adds an extended version of "Got My Mind Set on You".

In the UK, it was released on October 16, and spent four weeks at number two. It became the fifth best selling single of 1987.

The song was included in the Harrison compilation albums Best of Dark Horse 1976–1989 (1989) and Let It Roll: Songs by George Harrison (2009).

A live version was recorded for his Live in Japan (1992) album.

In 2010, AOL radio listeners chose "Got My Mind Set on You" as one of the 10 Best George Harrison Songs, appearing at number four on the list.

=== Music videos ===
Two music videos were released for the single. The first was directed by Willy Smax, and the second by Gary Weis. The first features a young man (played by Alexis Denisof) trying to win the heart of a girl in an amusement arcade. While the girl watches Harrison and his band (including Jeff Lynne on bass and Ray Cooper miming the saxophone) in a kinetoscope movie viewer, the young man tries to win a toy ballerina for the girl. He succeeds, but the ballerina somehow drops into Harrison's performance, to the girl's amusement.

The second video, inspired by the then-recently released comedy horror film Evil Dead II, depicts Harrison playing a blonde-colored Fender Telecaster guitar while seated in a study. As the song progresses, furniture and knick-knacks (including a stuffed squirrel, sentient chainsaw, a suit of armor, and mounted stag and warthog) begin to sing or dance along with the song. During the instrumental break, Harrison performs a backflip from his chair and follows it with a dance routine before jumping back to his seat, a scene performed by a dance double. The video was choreographed by Vincent Paterson.

The second video received significant airplay and was nominated for three MTV Video Music Awards.

=== Personnel ===
Credits sourced from Andrew Jackson and Mix

- George Harrison – lead and backing vocals, electric and acoustic guitars
- Jeff Lynne – backing vocals, Oberheim OB-X synthesizer, E-mu Emulator II, bass guitar
- Jim Keltner – drums, E-mu Drumulator programming
- Jim Horn – saxophones
- Ray Cooper – maracas

=== Track listings ===
7-inch

1. "Got My Mind Set on You" – 3:51
2. "Lay His Head" – 3:51

12-inch

1. "Got My Mind Set on You" (Extended Version) – 5:17
2. "Got My Mind Set on You" – 3:51
3. "Lay His Head" – 3:51

=== Charts ===
==== Weekly charts ====
Chart (1987–1988)	Peak position
Australia (Kent Music Report)	1
Austria (Ö3 Austria Top 40)	8
Belgium (Ultratop 50 Flanders)	3
Belgium (VRT Top 30 Flanders)	1
Canada (The Record)	2
Canada RPM Top Singles	1
Canada RPM Adult Contemporary	2
Denmark (IFPI)	2
France (SNEP)	19
Ireland (IRMA)	1
Italy Airplay (Music & Media)	4
Japan (Oricon)	64
Netherlands (Dutch Top 40)	4
Netherlands (Single Top 100)	9
New Zealand (Recorded Music NZ)	4
Norway (VG-lista)	10
South Africa (Springbok Radio)	5
Sweden (Sverigetopplistan)	10
Switzerland (Schweizer Hitparade)	11
UK Singles (Official Charts Company)	2
US Billboard Hot 100	1
US Adult Contemporary (Billboard)	1
US Mainstream Rock (Billboard)	4
US Cash Box Top 100	1
West Germany (GfK)	7

Chart (2020)	Peak position
Poland Airplay (ZPAV)	64

==== Year-end charts ====
Chart (1987)	Position
Australia (Australian Music Report)	95
Canada Top Singles (RPM)	61
Netherlands (Dutch Top 40)	84
UK Singles (OCC)	15

Chart (1988)	Position
Australia (ARIA)	17
Brazil (ABPD)	44
Canada Top Singles (RPM)	17
US Billboard Hot 100	3
US Adult Contemporary (Billboard)	3
West Germany (Media Control)	60

=== Certifications ===
Region	Certification	Certified units/sales
Italy (FIMI)	Gold	50,000^{‡}
New Zealand (RMNZ)	Platinum	30,000^{‡}
Spain (Promusicae)	Gold	30,000^{‡}
Sweden (GLF)	Gold	25,000^{^}
United Kingdom (BPI)	Platinum	600,000^{‡}
United States (RIAA)	Gold	1,000,000^{^}
^{^} Shipments figures based on certification alone.^{‡} Sales+streaming figures based on certification alone.

== Other covers and parodies ==
"Weird Al" Yankovic recorded a parody of "Got My Mind Set On You" using George Harrison's arrangement, titled "(This Song's Just) Six Words Long". It was released on Yankovic's 1988 album Even Worse and poked fun at Harrison's repetitive lyrics.

Shakin' Stevens recorded the song for his 2006 album Now Listen. Irish-Australian singer-songwriter Damien Leith recorded the song in 2012 for his album Now & Then. Irish singer Lee Matthews covered it in his 2015 album It's a Great Day to Be Alive. British entertainer and musician Warren James performed the song following his 2003 live performance for the show business charity the Grand Order of Water Rats, an organisation that Harrison was an active member of. Brandon Flowers recorded the song in 2014 for the 2016 tribute album George Fest.

== See also ==
- Hot 100 number-one hits of 1988 (United States)
