= Friar Park =

English Victorian neo-Gothic mansion, former home of George Harrison

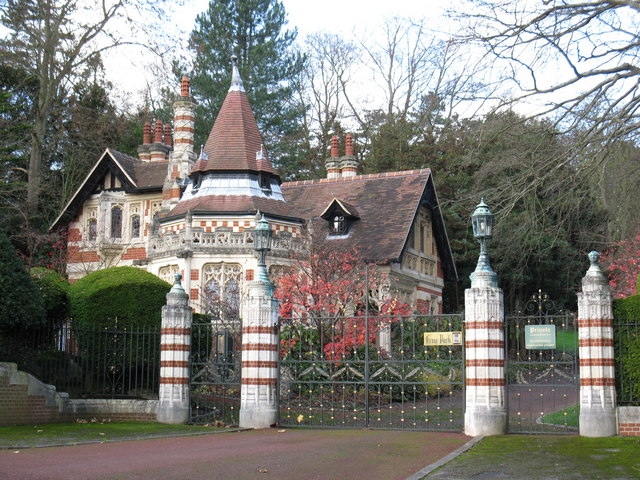
- The Lower Lodge and entrance gates of Friar Park from Gravel Hill in 2009
- Interactive map of the Friar Park area

General information
- Architectural style: Gothic revival
- Location: Henley-on-Thames, Oxfordshire, England
- Coordinates: 51.540149°N 0.914885°W
- Completed: 1895
- Owner: Olivia Harrison

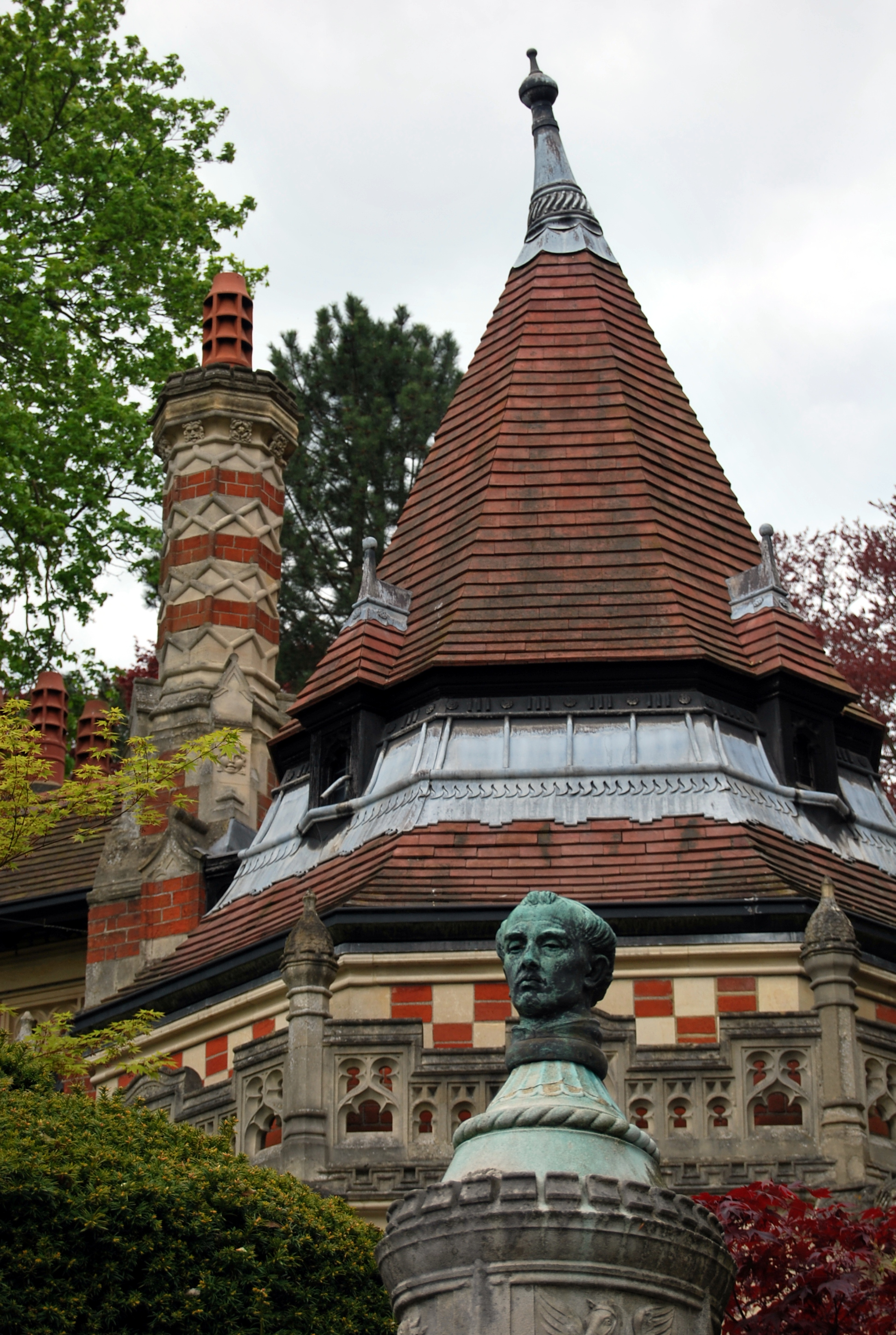
Detail of the roof of the Lower Lodge of Friar Park

Friar Park is a Victorian neo-Gothic mansion in Henley-on-Thames, England. Construction began in 1889 and was completed in 1895. It was built for lawyer Sir Frank Crisp, and purchased in January 1970 by English musician and Beatle George Harrison. The site covers about 30 acres (12 ha), and features caves, grottoes, underground passages, a multitude of garden gnomes, and an Alpine rock garden with a scale model of the Matterhorn.

== Overview ==
The main house is listed Grade II on the National Heritage List, and the gardens of Friar Park are also listed Grade II on the Register of Historic Parks and Gardens. In addition to the main house, the Lower Lodge, Middle Lodge, and Upper Lodge are all also individually listed Grade II. The entrance walls and piers of the Lower Lodge, and the railed wall piers and gates of the Middle Lodge are also listed Grade II.

Reports claiming that the building has 120 rooms were denied by current owner Olivia Harrison, while speaking to NPR Fresh Air in March 2004, at which time she said that, while she didn't know how many rooms there are, 120 is an over-statement.

Since the early 1970s, the property has become synonymous with the former Beatle's home studio, known as FPSHOT (i.e., "Friar Park Studio, Henley-On-Thames"). Harrison biographer Alan Clayson has described the Friar Park estate as being "as synonymous with his name as the Queen's with Windsor Castle".

The rumours and tabloid press reports claiming Harrison put the property up as collateral in order to fund the Monty Python comedy team's movie Life of Brian, after their original backers, EMI, pulled out at the last minute, are unfounded. The budget for the feature film in 1979 was $4 million. At the same time, Friar Park was worth less than £200,000. The rumour was an "inside joke" that was turned into a marketing scheme stating that Harrison simply wanted to get to see the film, something that his friend Eric Idle described for promotional purposes as "the most expensive cinema ticket in movie history".

== History ==
The Friar Park estate was owned by Sir Frank Crisp from 1889 until his death in 1919. The property was then sold at an auction to Sir Percival David. Following Sir Percival’s divorce, Lady David moved into the Coachman's Cottage on the south-west corner of the property. The rest of the estate was donated for the use of nuns belonging to the Salesians of Don Bosco order. The nuns ran a school in Henley called the Sacred Heart School. However, by the late 1960s, Friar Park was in a state of disrepair. The rumour that Friar Park was due to be demolished was unfounded and was little more than an "off-the-cuff" comment without any factual basis.

== George Harrison and FPSHOT ==
In early 1972, Harrison installed a 16-track tape-based recording studio in a guest suite, which, at one point, was superior to the one at EMI's Abbey Road Studios. By 1974, the facility had become the recording headquarters for his record label, Dark Horse Records. The album covers for projects Harrison recorded there usually mentioned "F.P.S.H.O.T." – Friar Park Studio, Henley-on-Thames. These include the bulk of his own albums, from 1973's Living in the Material World onwards; among them, Dark Horse, Thirty Three & 1/3, George Harrison, Cloud Nine and Brainwashed. The home housed the German artist and musician Klaus Voormann amid his separation from his first wife the English actress Christine Hargreaves in 1971.

In addition to Harrison's solo albums, overdubs for the two Traveling Wilburys releases and the recording and filming of The Beatles' 1995 Anthology project were also recorded at Friar Park Studio Henley-on-Thames. In 1996, Harrison recorded and produced the album Chants of India for Ravi Shankar at FPSHOT. Interviews with family and friends for posthumous documentaries such as 2003's Concert for George, the 2005 Concert for Bangladesh DVD release, and Martin Scorsese's George Harrison: Living in the Material World in 2011 were all conducted at FPSHOT or in the residential part of the house.

Besides the records by Harrison or artists he produced, the studio was also used by Shakespears Sister to record their 1992 album Hormonally Yours.

== The gardens ==
In the foreword to Harrison's 1980 memoir I, Me, Mine, Derek Taylor writes of Harrison's purchase of Friar Park: "It is a dream on a hill and it came, not by chance, to the right man at the right time."

Friar Park once had extensive gardens and water features that were designed by Henry Ernest Milner for Crisp, including a grotto, and stones just underneath the surface of the pond (providing a walking-on-water illusion). The majority of the gardens that once existed at Friar Park are long gone, having been on land that is no longer part of the estate, or on land that was overgrown with mature trees, or was repurposed. The Rockery to the northwest of the mansion includes a sandstone replica of the Matterhorn. Reflecting Crisp's sense of humour; among the statuary is a friar holding a frying pan with holes in it, and a plaque reading "Two Holy Friars". The year Harrison and his first wife, Pattie Boyd, moved in, he was photographed among four garden gnomes located on the main lawn for the cover of All Things Must Pass, and again with his father Harry six years later, with the photo appearing inside the gatefold cover of Thirty Three & 1/3.

Harrison immortalised the grand building and its surrounds in his 1976 song "Crackerbox Palace". Contrary to popular belief, George Harrison never referred to his estate as "Crackerbox Palace". Instead, Crackerbox Palace was the nickname for the California home of comedian Lord Buckley which was the actual inspiration for the song and its title. This rumour began as a consequence of George Harrison filming a promotional film for the song at the estate for the sake of convenience. The All Things Must Pass track "Ballad of Sir Frankie Crisp (Let It Roll)" was inspired by Friar Park's history, and the lyrics of later songs such as "Ding Dong, Ding Dong" and "The Answer's at the End" directly quote from the many carvings around the property. His humorous video clips for the likes of "Ding Dong, Ding Dong", "True Love", and "Crackerbox Palace" were all shot within the gardens and grounds of Friar Park, as were the album covers for some of his FPSHOT-recorded Dark Horse acts − Splinter's The Place I Love and the album Ravi Shankar's Music Festival from India being the most obvious.

Harrison restored very few (not all, as is often incorrectly reported) of the remaining gardens, essentially limited mostly to the Alpine Garden, Topiary Garden, Dutch Knot Garden, Japanese Garden, as well as glass houses and lake system. Until his death in November 2001, he loved tending to them personally − an activity that a visiting Rolling Stone journalist in 1987 deemed a "decidedly un-rock-star-ish pastime" − and among the groundskeepers were his older brothers Peter and Harry. Harrison's son Dhani remembered: "He'd garden at night-time until midnight. He'd be out there squinting because he could see, at midnight, the moonlight and shadows, and that was his way of not seeing the weeds or imperfections that would plague him during the day." Talking of the tranquility he felt at Friar Park, Harrison once said: "Sometimes I feel like I'm actually on the wrong planet, and I feel great when I'm in my garden. But the minute I go out the gate I think: 'What the hell am I doing here?'"

== Security concerns ==
During Crisp's time at Friar Park, the grounds were open to the public once a week during the spring and summer. Following the murder of John Lennon, Harrison's Beatles bandmate, in December 1980, the gates were locked and security features such as fences and video cameras installed. Despite these measures, an intruder, Michael Abram, broke into the residence in the early hours of 30 December 1999, attacking Harrison and his wife Olivia, and leaving Harrison with forty stab wounds and a punctured lung.

== See also ==
- Kinfauns, George Harrison's previous home
- 12 Arnold Grove, George Harrison's birthplace and boyhood home
