= Cloud Nine (George Harrison album) =

Studio album by George Harrison
- Released: 2 November 1987
- Recorded: January–August 1987
- Studio: FPSHOT (Oxfordshire)
- Genres: Rock; pop
- Length: 41:25
- Label: Dark Horse
- Producers: George Harrison; Jeff Lynne

George Harrison chronology
Gone Troppo (1982)	Cloud Nine (1987)	Best of Dark Horse 1976–1989 (1989)

Singles from Cloud Nine
- 1. "Got My Mind Set on You" Released: 12 October 1987; 2. "When We Was Fab" Released: 25 January 1988; 3. "This Is Love" Released: 13 June 1988

Cloud Nine is the eleventh studio album by the English rock musician George Harrison. The album was recorded and released in 1987 after Harrison had taken a five-year hiatus from his career as a solo artist. The hit single "Got My Mind Set on You" from this album re-established Harrison as a critically acclaimed and commercially significant recording artist. Cloud Nine was Harrison's final solo studio album to be released during his lifetime; his next album, Brainwashed, was released in 2002, almost a year after his death.

== Background and recording ==
Frustrated with the changing musical climate, Harrison suspended his recording career in the early 1980s. Instead of recording, he opted to pursue other interests, including film production with his own company, Handmade Films. The odd soundtrack or charity song would surface during this period, but otherwise, it was a musically silent period for Harrison.

By late 1986, after a substantial break, Harrison felt the desire to make music again. He asked former Electric Light Orchestra (ELO) leader and fellow musician Jeff Lynne to co-produce a new album with him. After writing a round of new compositions (including the songs already contributed to the 1986 film Shanghai Surprise), Harrison entered his home studio Friar Park in Henley-on-Thames on 5 January 1987 to begin recording his first new commercial album in five years. Having recorded the backing tracks for seventeen songs between January and March, he completed the album's overdubs in August 1987.

Besides Harrison and Lynne, other artists involved in the sessions included Jim Keltner and Ringo Starr on drums, Eric Clapton on guitar, and both Gary Wright and Elton John on piano (the latter was recovering from vocal surgery at the time). With new-found enthusiasm, Harrison actively promoted the album.

== Cover art ==
The cover features Harrison holding his first American-made guitar, a 1957 Gretsch 6128 Duo Jet, his "old black Gretsch", that he purchased in Liverpool in 1961. He had given it to his longtime friend Klaus Voormann, who had had it for 20 years before Harrison asked for it back. After having it restored, Harrison used the guitar for the Cloud Nine cover shoot.

== Release and aftermath ==
Harrison's cover of Rudy Clark's little-known song "Got My Mind Set on You" quickly reached number 1 in the United States and number 2 in the United Kingdom. It was Harrison's first single to top the US charts since "Give Me Love (Give Me Peace on Earth)" in 1973. A few weeks later, Cloud Nine was released to high anticipation and a favourable critical reception.

The album went to No. 10 in the UK. In the US, it peaked at No. 8 on the Billboard 200 chart and No. 4 on the Cash Box Top 200, and achieved platinum status; later, it was number 1 on Cash Box's Top 40 Compact Discs chart.

The "Got My Mind Set on You" single and its accompanying video re-introduced Harrison to the mainstream, and the Beatles tribute song "When We Was Fab" was a successful follow-up, reaching the top 25 in both the UK and US. The third single taken from the album, "This Is Love", was a minor hit in the UK.

While the success of Cloud Nine was not enough to spur Harrison to tour, it inspired him to continue making music. In the spring of 1988, along with Lynne, he would call up friends Bob Dylan, Tom Petty, and Roy Orbison and begin a project ultimately realised as the Traveling Wilburys.

In 2004, Cloud Nine was remastered and reissued by Dark Horse Records (with new distribution by EMI), both separately, and as part of the deluxe box set The Dark Horse Years 1976–1992. The reissue included the bonus tracks "Shanghai Surprise" and "Zig Zag" from the 1986 film Shanghai Surprise ("Zig Zag" had also been released as the B-side of the "When We Was Fab" single).

== Critical reception ==
Professional ratings
Review scores
Source	Rating
AllMusic	4/5 stars
Encyclopedia of Popular Music	4/5 stars
Houston Chronicle	5/5 stars
Los Angeles Times	3/4 stars
Mojo	4/5 stars
MusicHound Rock	4/5
New Musical Express	6/10
Rolling Stone	4/5 stars
Uncut	4/5 stars
The Village Voice	B−

Writing in Rolling Stone, David Wild described Cloud Nine as "an expertly crafted, endlessly infectious record that constitutes Harrison's best album since 1970s inspired All Things Must Pass". Wild also acknowledged Lynne's input as co-producer and praised "When We Was Fab", "Cloud 9", "That's What It Takes", and "Wreck of the Hesperus" as "sublime pop". In The New York Times, Stephen Holden called the release "crucial" to Harrison's career, adding: "A pleasingly tuneful album, its sound is deliberately quaint, as it explicitly evokes the Beatles' more romantic psychedelic music of the late 1960s." Although he regretted the inclusion of ballads such as "Breath Away from Heaven", Bill Holdship wrote in Creem that "a good album's a good album, and Cloud Nine is plenty good … it's the best record from a former Beatle in at least seven years."

Less impressed, Daniel Brogan of the Chicago Tribune opined: "Cloud Nine plods hopelessly. Most of the blame must fall on Harrison, though producer Jeff Lynne's influence is far too prevalent ... The album is occasionally redeemed by the deft guitar interplay between Harrison and Eric Clapton, as well as the perky single 'Got My Mind Set on You.'" In a five-star review for the Houston Chronicle, J.D. Considine wrote: "Forget the 'former Beatle' stuff – this album would be worth snapping up even if Harrison were some unknown from Encino." After remarking on Harrison's "stellar" cast of backing musicians, Considine added: "But as much as the playing enlivens the material, as with the dark, bluesy guitar riffs that open the title tune, it's the writing that deserves credit for this album's luster."

In a 2001 review, AllMusic editor Stephen Thomas Erlewine also gave the album five stars. He wrote that, with Lynne's help and "the focus on … snappy pop-rock numbers", Harrison "crafted a remarkably consistent and polished comeback effort with Cloud Nine", which Erlewine considered "one of his very best albums". In his 2002 posthumous appraisal of Harrison's solo career for Goldmine magazine, Dave Thompson described the album as "littered with highlights", calling "This Is Love" "a jewel", and wrote that "When We Was Fab" benefited from Lynne "wringing every last Beatle-esque effect out of his box of sonic tricks".

Reviewing the 2004 reissue, Uncut described Cloud Nine as "endowed with undeniable charm", and Rolling Stone deemed it to be a "late-career masterwork" from Harrison. Writing for Mojo in 2011, John Harris found the production dated, but praised the quality of the songs, including the "splendidly gonzo version" of "Got My Mind Set on You" and the "irresistible" "When We Was Fab", and considered Cloud Nine a "deserved global hit".

== Track listing ==
All songs by George Harrison, except where noted.

=== Original release ===
Side one

1. "Cloud 9" – 3:15
2. "That's What It Takes" (Harrison, Jeff Lynne, Gary Wright) – 3:59
3. "Fish on the Sand" – 3:22
4. "Just for Today" – 4:06
5. "This Is Love" (Harrison, Lynne) – 3:48
6. "When We Was Fab" (Harrison, Lynne) – 3:57

Side two

1. "Devil's Radio" – 3:52
2. "Someplace Else" – 3:51
3. "Wreck of the Hesperus" – 3:31
4. "Breath Away from Heaven" – 3:36
5. "Got My Mind Set on You" (Rudy Clark) – 3:52

=== 2004 reissue ===
Bonus tracks

12. "Shanghai Surprise" – 5:09
13. "Zig Zag" (Harrison, Lynne) – 2:45

iTunes Store bonus track:

14. "Got My Mind Set on You" (extended version) (Clark) – 5:17

== Personnel ==
The following is taken from the 2004 CD liner notes, except where noted.

- George Harrison – lead vocals, electric and acoustic guitars, keyboards, synthesizer, autoharp, sitar, backing vocals
- Jeff Lynne – bass guitar, acoustic and electric guitars, keyboards, synthesizer, backing vocals
- Eric Clapton – electric guitar on "Cloud 9", "That's What It Takes", "Devil's Radio", and "Wreck of the Hesperus"
- Elton John – Fender Rhodes on "Cloud 9", piano on "Devil's Radio" and "Wreck of the Hesperus"
- Gary Wright – piano on "Just for Today" and "When We Was Fab"
- Jim Horn – baritone and tenor saxophones on "Cloud 9", "Wreck of the Hesperus", and "Got My Mind Set on You"
- Jim Keltner – drums
- Ringo Starr – drums, backing vocals on "When We Was Fab"
- Ray Cooper – drums, percussion
- Bobby Kok – cello

== Charts ==
=== Weekly charts ===
Chart (1987–88)	Peak position
Australian Kent Music Report	4
Austrian Albums Chart	26
Canadian RPM 100 Albums	5
Dutch MegaChart Albums	30
Japanese Oricon Albums Chart	27
New Zealand Albums Chart	27
Norwegian VG-lista Albums	8
Swedish Albums Chart	5
Swiss Albums Chart	23
UK Albums Chart	10
US Billboard 200	8
US Cash Box Top 200 Albums	4
West German Media Control Albums	15
Chart (2004)	Position
Japanese Oricon Albums Chart	190
Chart (2024)	Peak position
Argentine Albums (CAPIF)	5

=== Year-end charts ===
Chart (1987)	Position
Canadian RPM Albums	77
UK Albums Chart	73
Chart (1988)	Position
Australian Albums Chart	24
Japanese Oricon Chart	91
US Billboard Top Pop Albums	31

== Certifications and sales ==
Region	Certification	Certified units/sales
Japan (Oricon Charts)	—	73,700
United Kingdom (BPI)	Gold	190,000
United States (RIAA)	Platinum	1,000,000^{^}
^{^} Shipments figures based on certification alone.
