= Run of the Mill (George Harrison song) =

- Cover of the original Hansen Publishing sheet music for the song

Song by George Harrison

from the album All Things Must Pass
- Released: 27 November 1970
- Genre: Folk rock
- Length: 2:49
- Label: Apple
- Songwriter: George Harrison
- Producers: George Harrison, Phil Spector

"Run of the Mill" is a song by English musician George Harrison, released on his 1970 triple album All Things Must Pass. Harrison wrote the song shortly after the Beatles' troubled Get Back sessions in early 1969, during a period when his growth as a songwriter had inadvertently contributed to the dysfunction within the Beatles' group dynamic. It is commonly asserted that the lyrics reflect the toll that running their company Apple Corps had taken on relationships within the band, especially between Paul McCartney and the other three Beatles, as well as Harrison's dismay at John Lennon's emotional withdrawal from the band. Many commentators recognise "Run of the Mill" as one of several Harrison compositions that provide an insight into events behind the Beatles' break-up, particularly the difficulties surrounding Apple.

The song's release coincided with a falling out between Harrison and McCartney, which, perhaps, contributed to the latter taking legal action to dissolve the Beatles partnership. The musical arrangement for "Run of the Mill" bears the influence of the Band, with whom Harrison had spent time in Woodstock before starting work on the Get Back project. Co-produced by Phil Spector, the recording features contributions from Gary Wright and former members of Delaney & Bonnie's Friends band, including Jim Gordon, Jim Price and Bobby Whitlock.

Biographers and reviewers have variously described "Run of the Mill" as an essay on karma, a tale of lost friendship, and a love song to the Beatles. Olivia Harrison has named it among her favourites of all her late husband's compositions. An alternative version of the song, performed solo by Harrison on acoustic guitar, appears on the 2012 compilation Early Takes: Volume 1.

== Background ==
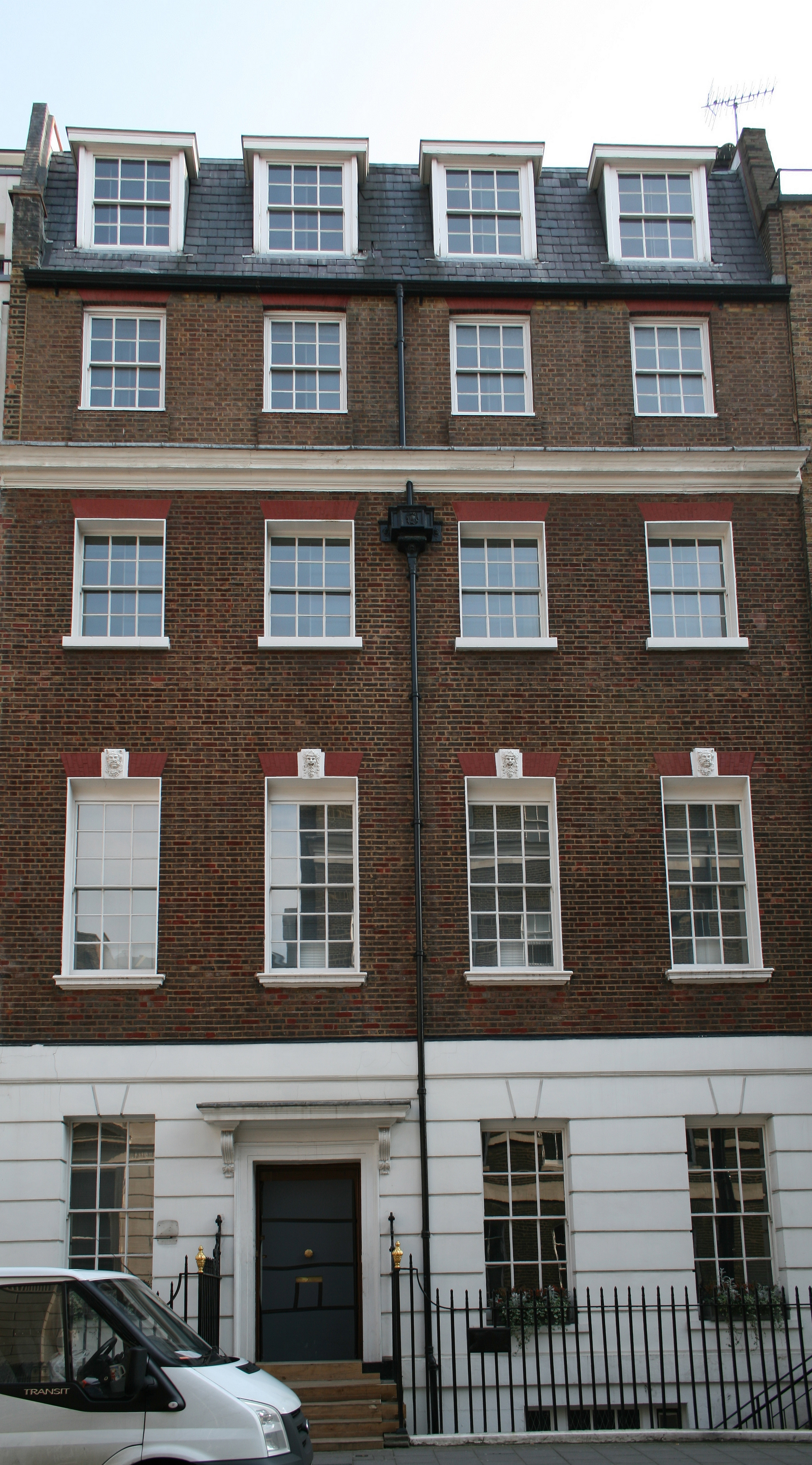
The Beatles' Apple offices, at 3 Savile Row, London

Author Simon Leng has written of George Harrison experiencing an "incredible phase of creativity" throughout 1969, following his time spent in Woodstock, New York with Bob Dylan and the Band in late 1968. Commentators note that Harrison's growth as a composer would have to happen almost in spite of the Beatles, given his customary junior status to bandmates John Lennon and Paul McCartney. The Beatles' Get Back sessions in January 1969 inspired the Harrison songs "I Me Mine" and "Wah-Wah", both of which reflected the fractious situation within the band, and his return to their fold after walking out of these filmed rehearsals allowed him to dictate terms for their immediate future. (Note: One of his conditions for rejoining the band was that the Beatles abandon McCartney's plan to return to live performance before an audience. At this stage, Harrison committed only to completing the band's film project, later released as Let It Be (1970).) McCartney and Lennon now looked at Harrison "with new respect", author Alan Clayson suggests. Mersey Beat founding editor Bill Harry was another to notice a change in Harrison compared to earlier in the 1960s, writing: "He wasn't under the domination of the others. He wasn't a passenger any more." An additional factor in Harrison's assuredness was his introduction to the Hare Krishna movement, following a meeting with devotee Shyamasundar Das at Apple Corps headquarters in December 1968.

Me, I was never really interested in Apple shops or anything else. During the whole Apple period, I was always mainly interested in working in the studio, recording ... I couldn’t be bothered to follow through [with business ideas]. I suppose my attitude didn’t help.

— George Harrison to Melody Maker, 1975

The financial problems within the Beatles' Apple business empire became another divisive issue at this time. From summer 1968 until the appointment of Allen Klein as business manager in March 1969, McCartney was a regular presence at Apple's central London headquarters, calling staff meetings and urging financial restraint. While noting that all the individual Beatles were demanding employers, Apple press officer Derek Taylor later described McCartney as "the bossiest of the bossy"; according to Tony Bramwell, Apple Records' head of promotions, Lennon and partner Yoko Ono inflicted "their own reign of terror". On 18 January, Disc magazine published what author Peter Doggett describes as "a heroin-fuelled monologue" by Lennon in which he said of Apple's finances: "If it carries on like this, all of us will be broke in the next few months." While McCartney sought to appoint his in-laws, New York lawyers Lee and John Eastman, as the band's business advisors, Lennon's outburst attracted the attention of the less conservative Klein. The latter effectively became the Beatles' manager when Harrison and Ringo Starr also chose to put their faith in his tough approach to business. Refusing to acknowledge Klein as his representative, McCartney later cited this division as the first "irreconcilable difference" among the four Beatles, leading to the band's break-up in April 1970.

Although he was actively involved as a director of Apple Records, and remained committed to running the label until its winding down in 1973, Harrison viewed the concept of Apple as Lennon and McCartney's egos "running away with themselves or with each other". Harrison's relief from the tedium of business meetings through February and March 1969 was reflected in his composition "Here Comes the Sun", which he wrote in Eric Clapton's garden while "sag[ging] off" from Apple. Around the same time, Harrison wrote "Run of the Mill", a song addressing the failure of friendships within the band – or as he put it, "the problem of partnerships".

== Composition ==
The song title was a play on "trouble at t'mill", a Northern English term for conflict at the local factory or workplace. Doggett suggests that "run of the mill" might also have been a condemnation of Harrison's songwriting uttered by one of his bandmates during the fraught Get Back sessions at Twickenham Film Studios. (Note: As with the months of recording for their double album The Beatles in 1968, the Get Back film project was marred by a lack of co-operation among band members. Authors Doug Sulpy and Ray Schweighardt write of Harrison's predicament on the first day at Twickenham: "The respect he received from fellow musicians such as Bob Dylan and Eric Clapton could not be found within his own band. His new compositions were routinely derogated and rejected by John Lennon and Paul McCartney, even though some were far better than their own.")

In his 1980 autobiography, I, Me, Mine, Harrison describes the lyrics to "Run of the Mill" as "the first song I ever wrote that looked like a poem on paper". The words run in a continuum, uninterrupted by instrumental breaks of any kind. The opening verse outlines what theologian Dale Allison terms "a statement of responsibility":

Everyone has choice
When to or not to raise their voices
It's you that decides ...

It was when Apple was getting crazy ... Paul was falling out with us all and going around Apple offices saying "You're no good" – everyone was just incompetent (the Spanish Inquisition sketch). It was that period – the problem of partnerships.

— Harrison to Derek Taylor, 1979, on writing "Run of the Mill"

In I, Me, Mine, Harrison introduces these words with a reference to McCartney's heavy-handedness at Apple and likens the scene to a Monty Python comedy routine. (Note: In January 1969, Harrison and Derek Taylor announced plans to write a musical comedy based on life at Apple's headquarters, at 3 Savile Row. With Harrison's support, Python member Eric Idle lampooned the chaotic running of the company in his 1978 Beatles satire The Rutles, also known as All You Need Is Cash.) In the lyrics to "Run of the Mill", author Ian Inglis notes that, rather than "exacerbat[ing] the poisonous atmosphere that hangs over the group, by merely adding to the endless stream of insults and counterinsults", Harrison shows "genuine regret" at what has transpired and "warns against trying to shift the blame" for one's actions. Another biographer, Joshua Greene, suggests that partly through his association with the Hare Krishna movement, Harrison was now "too sure of his life's higher purpose to waste any more time on petty squabbles". (Note: According to Greene, Shyamasundar visited the Beatles during the Get Back sessions, at Harrison's request. Although Lennon and McCartney's disillusion with the band's collective search for spiritual enlightenment, via meditation and the teachings of Maharishi Mahesh Yogi, was evident during the rehearsals, the meeting was a success, Greene writes, in that it briefly inspired an otherwise unengaged Lennon.)

Inglis views part of the second verse as a reference to the "abuse and humiliation" that Harrison had received at Twickenham, echoing the sentiments of "Wah-Wah". In the verse-two lines "Another day for you to realize me / Or send me down again", Doggett similarly recognises Lennon's "unfeeling" criticism of Harrison's new songs, while author Andrew Grant Jackson views both Lennon and McCartney as the target of this sentiment.

The theme of "failed or betrayed friendship", in Leng's words, is most evident midway through the third verse, with the lines "You've got me wondering how I lost your friendship / But I see it in your eyes". Doggett interprets this statement as reflecting Harrison's "decaying relationship" with McCartney at the time. Lennon too had been a friend of Harrison's since school days, and Leng includes him as a source of Harrison's "minibereavement" at the Beatles' impending demise. (Note: Contributing to the friction between Harrison and Lennon at this time – and an impediment in their friendship until Lennon's death in 1980 – Harrison was the only member of the Beatles to have voiced his displeasure at Ono's intrusion in band matters. In a 1987 interview with journalist Anthony DeCurtis, Harrison used this "I see it in your eyes" theme regarding friendship when discussing his relationship with Lennon during the last few years of his life: "That period where he was cooking bread and stuff, I always got an overpowering feeling from him ... You could see it in his eyes ... it was almost like he was crying out to tell me certain things or to renew things, relationships, but he wasn't able to, because of the situation he was in.")

In the song's two bridge sections, Leng notes the "psychological stress" implied by Harrison switching from a minor chord to its major voicing on the final word of lines such as "Though I'm beside you, I can't carry the blame for you". Leng writes of this song-wide message: "It presents his realization that he has to walk away and carry on with his own life. George Harrison is not his Beatle brothers' keeper."

The final verse urges an awareness of the consequences of chasing personal success, echoing what Greene views as the underlying message behind Harrison's temporary departure from the Beatles in January 1969 – that "[character], not career, should govern their behavior":

How high will you leap?
Will you make enough for you to reap it?
Only you arrive
At your own made end ...

Inglis writes that through Harrison's repetition of "It's you that decides" from earlier in the song, to serve here as his parting statement, "Run of the Mill" becomes "less of an accusation and more of a plea". On "the most obvious level", Inglis adds, the song "appears to be directed toward McCartney", as well as the divisions within the Beatles that reflect Apple's precarious position in 1969. In a January 2001 interview with Guitar World magazine, Harrison remarked of this period: "At that point in time, Paul couldn't see beyond himself. He was on a roll, but ... in his mind, everything that was going on around him was just there to accompany him. He wasn't sensitive to stepping on other people's egos or feelings."

Along with "Wah-Wah", "Isn't It a Pity" and "Apple Scruffs", Leng cites "Run of the Mill" as contributing to its parent album's status in the Beatles' history – namely, that All Things Must Pass was "the first instalment of the inside story about being caught in that Kafkaesque chain of events". Further Harrison compositions serving as episodes in what Leng calls "the Beatles soap opera" include "Sue Me, Sue You Blues", "Who Can See It" and "Living in the Material World". (Note: The "self-referential nature of many of the solo Beatles songs", as Leng puts it, is similarly evident in Starr's "Early 1970", Lennon's "God" and "How Do You Sleep?", and McCartney's "Too Many People".)

== Recording ==
All we have to do is accept that we're all individuals and that we all have as much potential as each other ... I'm certainly ready to be able to try and work things out with whoever I'm with.

— Harrison to WPLJ Radio, April 1970, discussing relationships among the Beatles, shortly before he recorded the song

McCartney's refusal to have the release of his eponymous first solo album delayed to allow for the Beatles' Let It Be album led to him revealing the band's break-up on 10 April 1970. Late that month, Harrison visited Apple's new offices at 1700 Broadway, New York, where he announced his intention to begin working with American producer Phil Spector on an album of his unused songs, some of which he had been stockpiling for up to four years. Noting the emotional disarray of Lennon, McCartney and Starr at this point, Doggett writes of their former bandmate: "Harrison retained a sense of objectivity. The youngest Beatle, he was now the group's wisest spokesman." In an interview for New York's WPLJ Radio, Harrison remarked of McCartney's objections to Klein running Apple: "The reality is that he's outvoted, and we're a partnership ... [L]ike in any other business or group, you have a vote, and he was outvoted three to one ..."

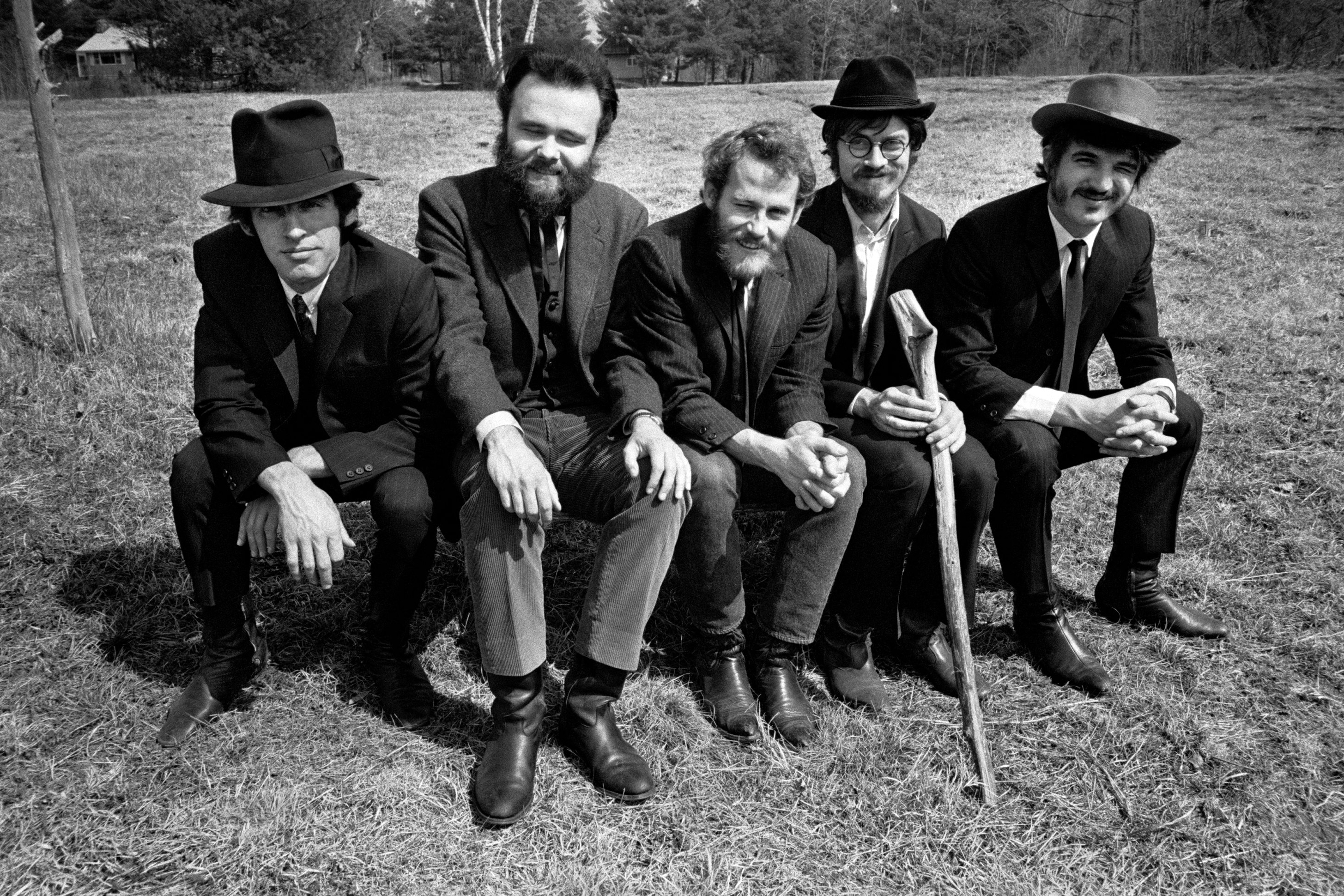
The Band, pictured in Woodstock in 1969

Harrison taped a solo demo of "Run of the Mill" at London's Abbey Road Studios on 20 May. Once the full sessions were under way, from 26 May, Harrison gave the song a musical arrangement that Leng has likened to the "minimalist tradition" of the Band's work in 1968–69, an influence that was apparent also in "All Things Must Pass", "Behind That Locked Door" and other tracks on the album. The musicians accompanying Harrison on the session for "Run of the Mill" were all former members of Delaney & Bonnie and Friends, with whom he had toured briefly in December 1969 – Jim Gordon (drums), Carl Radle (bass) and Bobby Whitlock (harmonium). In addition, ex-Spooky Tooth Gary Wright played piano.

According to Leng's study of All Things Must Pass, and to Whitlock's recollection, Harrison played all of the song's acoustic guitar parts. On what author Bruce Spizer notes as a "delicate recording", these guitar lines accentuate the melody's tumbling descents. (Note: The precise line-up of musicians for each song on All Things Must Pass continues to be the subject of conjecture. Spizer suggests that Humble Pie guitarist Peter Frampton may have played acoustic guitar also on "Run of the Mill".) Aside from Wright's piano, the most prominent instrumentation on the recording is the trumpet and saxophone motif that opens and closes the song. Harrison vocalised the melody for this motif in his guide vocal on the basic track, before two other former Delaney & Bonnie sidemen, Jim Price and Bobby Keys, overdubbed the brass parts. This same motif later inspired Harrison's song "Soft Touch", written in the Virgin Islands in 1976 and issued on the George Harrison album three years later.

== Release ==
"Run of the Mill" was released on 27 November 1970 as the final track on disc one of All Things Must Pass, in its triple LP format. The song followed "Let It Down", a track featuring Spector's full Wall of Sound production treatment, and so provided "the perfect antidote to the barrage of sound", according to authors Chip Madinger and Mark Easter, who draw parallels with Harrison's "Long, Long, Long" being sequenced to follow "Helter Skelter" on The Beatles (1968).

Among Beatles biographers who have written of this period, Nicholas Schaffner described All Things Must Pass and Lennon's concurrent Plastic Ono Band as having "more than compensated for the absence of the Beatles' customary Yuletide offering", while Robert Rodriguez refers to the end of 1970 as "the absolute nadir of Beatlemania", with McCartney filing suit in Britain's High Court to dissolve the band's business partnership. (Note: McCartney's legal action followed an unsuccessful meeting with Harrison in New York in December 1970. The animosity between Harrison and McCartney led to a period of estrangement between the two musicians; according to author Keith Badman, they would not be seen socialising together publicly until March 1975.) Against this backdrop, Doggett writes, "Run of the Mill" provided "the most compelling testimony to the recent past", on an album that offered listeners "a teasing glimpse into an intimate world that had previously been off limits to the public".

== Reception and legacy ==
On release, Ben Gerson of Rolling Stone praised "Run of the Mill" as a "vintage Beatle" song, a composition of "poignance and McCartneyesque lyricism", while Melody Maker's Richard Williams acknowledged Harrison's transformation from his previous, third-Beatle status: "Harrison's light has been hidden under the egos of McCartney and Lennon. From time to time there have been hints on several of their albums that he was more than he was being allowed to be." Writing in 1977, Nicholas Schaffner referred to "Run of the Mill" as "an essay on karma" and highlighted the message underpinning the song: "It's you that decides ... your own made end".

Simon Leng identifies a thematic link between it and other songs in the Harrison canon, notably "See Yourself", from Thirty Three & 1/3 (1976). Leng rates "Run of the Mill" "one of his most successful" compositions, through its acknowledgment that human relationships are "the other side of the coin" from the spiritual search represented in "My Sweet Lord" and "Hear Me Lord". Ian Inglis writes that "Its rolling melody and warm vocals give it the texture of a love song, which, of course, it is: a love song to the Beatles." In his book subtitled The Essential Songs of the Beatles' Solo Careers, Andrew Grant Jackson concludes of "Run of the Mill": "Such personal musings would be irrelevant to anyone but the biggest Beatle fans if Harrison hadn't so artfully written the words to be open-ended and applicable to anyone … A touching work of maturity by a little brother who saw more clearly than the others, realizing that he loved them but it was time to move on."

Speaking in February 2001 during promotion for the 30th anniversary reissue of All Things Must Pass, Harrison named "Run of the Mill" first among his three favourite tracks on the album, followed by "Isn't It a Pity" and "Awaiting on You All". The song particularly resonates with its composer's widow, Olivia Harrison. "George singing was always beguiling to me", she writes in her introduction to the posthumous edition of I, Me, Mine, "and countless times I was his audience of one. Run of the Mill was a song I often asked him to play, the lyrics so wise, especially the reminder that, 'Tomorrow when you rise, another day for you to realise me' ('me' being God) ..." Speaking to Mojo magazine in December 2011, ten years after her husband's death, Olivia Harrison named it as the song that most reminded her of Harrison. Music critic Tim Riley calls it "the best of the lot" on All Things Must Pass.

In his review of Harrison's 2014 Apple reissues, Paul Trynka of Classic Rock cites "Run of the Mill" as "the perfect example" of how All Things Must Pass still "sounds fresh despite its familiarity". Trynka continues: "Like many of Harrison's songs, the opening and chords are sweet, reassuringly recognisable, but just as we settle down the melody skips away, aided by his trademark trick of a brief switch of time signature. It's dazzling craftsmanship – yet sweet and unforced."

== Alternative version ==
The 1970 demo version of "Run of the Mill" appears briefly in Martin Scorsese's George Harrison: Living in the Material World documentary (2011), playing over a scene where Harrison takes to the stage for one of his 1974 Dark Horse Tour concerts, before cutting to him and his wife on an empty beach at sunset. Although available since the 1990s on bootleg collections such as Beware of ABKCO!, this solo demo was only issued officially in the UK in November 2011, with the deluxe edition DVD release of the film. Six months later, it received worldwide release on the Early Takes: Volume 1 compilation. Noting Harrison's usual practice of perfecting his guitar parts, compilation producer Giles Martin commented: "While that's a very valid practice, I think it can sometimes inhibit the spirit of the recording ... [T]he appeal of this version to me is that it's very rough and edgy."

== Personnel ==
The musicians who performed on "Run of the Mill" are believed to be as follows:

- George Harrison – vocals, acoustic guitars, backing vocals
- Gary Wright – piano
- Bobby Whitlock – harmonium
- Carl Radle – bass
- Jim Gordon – drums
- Jim Price – trumpets, horn arrangement
- Bobby Keys – saxophone

== Sources ==
- Dale C. Allison Jr, The Love There That's Sleeping: The Art and Spirituality of George Harrison, Continuum (New York, NY, 2006; ISBN 978-0-8264-1917-0).
- Keith Badman, The Beatles Diary Volume 2: After the Break-Up 1970–2001, Omnibus Press (London, 2001; ISBN 0-7119-8307-0).
- The Beatles, The Beatles Anthology, Chronicle Books (San Francisco, CA, 2000; ISBN 0-8118-2684-8).
- Harry Castleman & Walter J. Podrazik, All Together Now: The First Complete Beatles Discography 1961–1975, Ballantine Books (New York, NY, 1976; ISBN 0-345-25680-8).
- Alan Clayson, George Harrison, Sanctuary (London, 2003; ISBN 1-86074-489-3).
- Peter Doggett, "Fight to the Finish", Mojo Special Limited Edition: 1000 Days of Revolution (The Beatles' Final Years – Jan 1, 1968 to Sept 27, 1970), Emap (London, 2003), pp. 134–40.
- Peter Doggett, You Never Give Me Your Money: The Beatles After the Breakup, It Books (New York, NY, 2011; ISBN 978-0-06-177418-8).
- The Editors of Rolling Stone, Harrison, Rolling Stone Press/Simon & Schuster (New York, NY, 2002; ISBN 0-7432-3581-9).
- Joshua M. Greene, Here Comes the Sun: The Spiritual and Musical Journey of George Harrison, John Wiley & Sons (Hoboken, NJ, 2006; ISBN 978-0-470-12780-3).
- George Harrison, I Me Mine, Chronicle Books (San Francisco, CA, 2002 [1980]; ISBN 0-8118-3793-9).
- Bill Harry, The George Harrison Encyclopedia, Virgin Books (London, 2003; ISBN 978-0-7535-0822-0).
- Mark Hertsgaard, A Day in the Life: The Music and Artistry of the Beatles, Pan Books (London, 1996; ISBN 0-330-33891-9).
- Chris Hunt (ed.), NME Originals: Beatles – The Solo Years 1970–1980, IPC Ignite! (London, 2005).
- Elliot J. Huntley, Mystical One: George Harrison – After the Break-up of the Beatles, Guernica Editions (Toronto, ON, 2006; ISBN 1-55071-197-0).
- Ian Inglis, The Words and Music of George Harrison, Praeger (Santa Barbara, CA, 2010; ISBN 978-0-313-37532-3).
- Simon Leng, While My Guitar Gently Weeps: The Music of George Harrison, Hal Leonard (Milwaukee, WI, 2006; ISBN 1-4234-0609-5).
- Ian MacDonald, Revolution in the Head: The Beatles' Records and the Sixties, Pimlico (London, 1998; ISBN 0-7126-6697-4).
- Chip Madinger & Mark Easter, Eight Arms to Hold You: The Solo Beatles Compendium, 44.1 Productions (Chesterfield, MO, 2000; ISBN 0-615-11724-4).
- Barry Miles, The Beatles Diary Volume 1: The Beatles Years, Omnibus Press (London, 2001; ISBN 0-7119-8308-9).
- Chris O'Dell (with Katherine Ketcham), Miss O'Dell: My Hard Days and Long Nights with The Beatles, The Stones, Bob Dylan, Eric Clapton, and the Women They Loved, Touchstone (New York, NY, 2009; ISBN 978-1-4165-9093-4).
- Tim Riley, Tell Me Why: A Beatles Commentary, Da Capo Press (Cambridge, MA, 2002; ISBN 978-0-306-81120-3).
- Robert Rodriguez, Fab Four FAQ 2.0: The Beatles' Solo Years, 1970–1980, Backbeat Books (Milwaukee, WI, 2010; ISBN 978-1-4165-9093-4).
- Patricia Romanowski & Holly George-Warren (eds), The New Rolling Stone Encyclopedia of Rock & Roll, Fireside/Rolling Stone Press (New York, NY, 1995; ISBN 0-684-81044-1).
- Nicholas Schaffner, The Beatles Forever, McGraw-Hill (New York, NY, 1978; ISBN 0-07-055087-5).
- Howard Sounes, Fab: An Intimate Life of Paul McCartney, HarperCollins (London, 2010; ISBN 978-0-00-723705-0).
- Bruce Spizer, The Beatles Solo on Apple Records, 498 Productions (New Orleans, LA, 2005; ISBN 0-9662649-5-9).
- Doug Sulpy & Ray Schweighardt, Get Back: The Unauthorized Chronicle of The Beatles' Let It Be Disaster, St. Martin's Griffin (New York, 1997; ISBN 0-312-19981-3).
- Gary Tillery, Working Class Mystic: A Spiritual Biography of George Harrison, Quest Books (Wheaton, IL, 2011; ISBN 978-0-8356-0900-5).
- Bobby Whitlock (with Marc Roberty), Bobby Whitlock: A Rock 'n' Roll Autobiography, McFarland (Jefferson, NC, 2010; ISBN 978-0-7864-6190-5).
