= See Yourself =

Song by George Harrison

from the album Thirty Three & 1/3
- Released: 19 November 1976
- Genre: Rock, pop
- Length: 2:51
- Label: Dark Horse
- Songwriter(s): George Harrison
- Producer(s): George Harrison with Tom Scott

"See Yourself" is a song by English musician George Harrison, released on his 1976 album Thirty Three & 1/3. Harrison began writing the song in 1967, while he was a member of the Beatles, in response to the public outcry surrounding bandmate Paul McCartney's admission that he had taken the hallucinogenic drug LSD. McCartney's announcement created a reaction in the press similar to that caused in 1966 by John Lennon's statement that the Beatles were more popular than Christianity. In its finished form, the song's lyrics advocate self-awareness and consideration for the consequences of one's actions. Musically, the composition contains unusual shifts in time signature from standard 4/4 to 9/8, while the words reflect the era of its genesis by recalling themes first espoused in the Beatles tracks "Within You Without You" and "All You Need Is Love".

Harrison recorded "See Yourself" at his Friar Park home studio in Henley, Oxfordshire. The recording features extensive use of keyboard instruments, played by Billy Preston, Gary Wright and Harrison, the last of whom contributed one of the track's prominent synthesizer parts. On the album cover, Harrison dedicated the song to Paramahansa Yogananda, founder of the Self-Realization Fellowship and author of Autobiography of a Yogi.

== Background ==
Along with Beatles bandmate John Lennon and their wives, George Harrison first took the hallucinogenic drug Lysergic acid diethylamide (LSD) in April 1965, when a dentist friend slipped it into their after-dinner coffee. The heightened perception induced by the hallucinogen inspired both musicians in their subsequent work with the Beatles, notably on the albums Revolver (1966) and Sgt. Pepper's Lonely Hearts Club Band (1967), and led directly to a shared interest in Eastern philosophical concepts and meditation. Harrison later said of the profound change he felt as a result of first taking the drug: "I had such an overwhelming feeling of well-being, that there was a God, and I could see him in every blade of grass. It was like gaining hundreds of years of experience within twelve hours. It changed me, and there was no way back to what I was before."

While Ringo Starr had joined Harrison and Lennon for their second LSD experience, in August 1965, Paul McCartney remained wary of its reality-distorting effect and, despite peer pressure from his bandmates, declined to partake of the drug until late in 1966. On 19 June 1967, by which time it had become the recreational drug of choice among the counterculture, during the Summer of Love, McCartney confirmed to an ITN reporter that he had taken LSD, having already admitted as much to journalists from Life magazine and the Sunday People over the previous few days. A public outcry followed McCartney's announcement, which inconvenienced the other Beatles by bringing their drug use into the spotlight. (Note: Previously, as MBEs, the Beatles had received a degree of privilege regarding their private lives. In February 1967, police officers waited for Harrison and wife Pattie Boyd to leave an all-night party at Rolling Stone Keith Richards' house in Sussex before raiding the property and arresting Richards, Mick Jagger and Chelsea art dealer Robert Fraser for possession of drugs.) Author Ian MacDonald describes McCartney's candour as a "careless admission" that, as with Lennon's comment in March 1966 that the Beatles were more popular than Christianity, "brought howls of righteous anger on their heads".

Although Harrison, Lennon and Starr appeared to support McCartney's claim that it was the media's responsibility to decide whether the admission should become public knowledge, and not the individual's responsibility to lie, they were also suspicious about McCartney's motives, with Harrison suggesting he had done it for attention. Lennon later equated the episode with McCartney's announcement of the Beatles' break-up as part of his promotion for his 1970 solo album, McCartney, Lennon stating in a 1972 interview: "He always times his big announcements right on the letter, doesn't he?" (Note: In the 2000 book Anthology, Starr similarly comments that McCartney had a tendency to "[make] the statements" regarding issues such as the group's drug-taking or the break-up. Harrison was also critical of McCartney's apparent opportunism in encouraging speculation about a possible Beatles reunion, particularly when McCartney was promoting a tour or a new album during the 1980s and 1990s.)

== Composition ==
The press had a field day. I thought Paul should have been quiet about it – I wish he hadn't said anything ... It seemed strange to me, because we'd been trying to get him to take LSD for about eighteen months – and then one day he's on the television talking about it.

– George Harrison, 2000

Harrison began writing the song "See Yourself" in 1967 in response to the furore surrounding McCartney's admission. In his autobiography, I Me Mine, Harrison introduces the opening verse, which begins "It's easier to tell a lie than it is to tell the truth", with the comment "There was a big outcry with people saying [to McCartney] 'You should have said "No!"' ..." Author Ian Inglis suggests that this opening lyric reveals Harrison's "mixed emotions over the wisdom of total honesty". Inglis adds that "while the dilemma about whether to reveal or conceal the truth to others is insuperable, the important thing is to be true to oneself", as reflected in the song title.

Musically, the composition incorporates a shift in time signature during the verses, from standard rock 4/4 rhythm to what Harrison biographer Simon Leng describes as "stuttering, staccato" 9/8. This departure from pop convention was reflective of Harrison's immersion in Indian music, during a period when he devoted himself to studying the sitar, partly under the tuition of Bengali Hindu musician Ravi Shankar.

In I Me Mine, Harrison states that after writing much of the song in 1967, he forgot about it until nine years later. By then, after having espoused self-realization and God consciousness in much of his solo work since the Beatles' break-up, Harrison had chosen to soften his message, partly as a result of the contentment he had found with his new partner, Olivia Arias. Along with the lyrics to the song's second and third verses, Harrison completed the middle eight in 1976:

It's easier to hurt someone and make them cry
Than it is to dry their eyes
I got tired of fooling 'round with other people's lives
Rather I'd find someone that's true.

In the final verse, Inglis identifies similar "reflections about the politics of free will" as in Lennon's lyric "There's nothing you can do that can't be done", from the Beatles' 1967 single "All You Need Is Love":

It's easier to say you won't than it is to feel you can
It's easier to drag your feet than it is to be a man
It's easier to look at someone else's wealth
Than to see yourself.

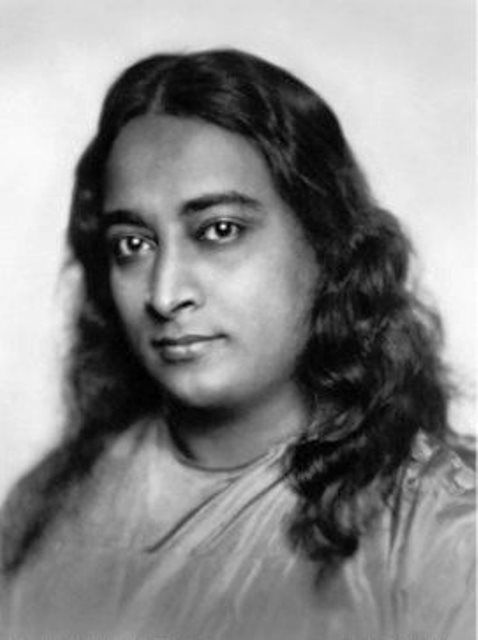
Paramahansa Yogananda (pictured in the 1940s), to whom Harrison dedicated his song "See Yourself"

Inglis writes that by "see", Harrison means to "know" oneself. In this way, "See Yourself" echoes the message of Harrison's 1967 compositions for the Beatles "Within You Without You" and "It's All Too Much" – both of which he wrote while absorbing the teachings of Paramahansa Yogananda, founder of the Self-Realization Fellowship. (Note: In June 1967, Yogananda was among Harrison's choice of Indian yogis pictured on the cover of the Beatles' Sgt. Pepper's Lonely Hearts Club Band.) In a December 1967 interview, Harrison paraphrased part of the song's lyrics when asked to comment on the criticism then being levelled against the Beatles' Transcendental Meditation teacher, Maharishi Mahesh Yogi, saying: "It's easier to criticise somebody than to see yourself."

Leng views the lyrical themes in "See Yourself" as similar to those of two songs focusing on human relationships, "Run of the Mill" and "Isn't It a Pity", both released on Harrison's 1970 triple album All Things Must Pass. Leng highlights "Run of the Mill"'s theme of "individual choice versus responsibility" and "Isn't It a Pity"'s preoccupation with "selfishness, false words, and false friends" as areas that Harrison revisits in "See Yourself".

== Recording ==
Following the expiration of his recording contract with EMI-affiliated Apple Records in January 1976, Harrison recorded "See Yourself" for his debut album on his Dark Horse record label, Thirty Three & 1/3. He returned to the song at the suggestion of Shankar's nephew, Kumar Shankar, who worked as a sound engineer at Harrison's home studio, FPSHOT, in Henley-on-Thames, Oxfordshire. "See Yourself" was one of a number of unfinished compositions from the late 1960s that Harrison revisited when making the album, in what some commentators view as a sign of writer's block, brought on by charges that he had plagiarised the Ronnie Mack song "He's So Fine" in his 1970–71 hit single "My Sweet Lord". (Note: As a result of this copyright infringement suit, which had finally gone to court in New York in February 1976, Harrison admitted that he was "paranoid about writing" and reluctant to compose any new songs "in case I touched somebody's note". For Thirty Three & 1/3, aside from "See Yourself", Harrison recorded two compositions he had begun in 1969, "Woman Don't You Cry for Me" and "Beautiful Girl", as well as a rare cover version – the 1956 Cole Porter song "True Love".)

The sessions for Thirty Three & 1/3 took place at FPSHOT, beginning in May 1976, with jazz saxophonist and arranger Tom Scott providing production assistance. Harrison played acoustic guitar on the basic track, accompanied by Billy Preston (piano), Gary Wright (keyboards), Willie Weeks (bass) and Alvin Taylor (drums). Leng notes the influence of Wright's 1975 hit album The Dream Weaver on the recording and describes "See Yourself" as "the first Harrisong basically arranged for synthesizers". Preston, Harrison and Wright all contributed synthesizer parts, while Harrison also overdubbed tambourine and backing vocals. Speaking in Los Angeles later in the year, Harrison said of the track: "As we overdubbed more things on it, I began to like it more and more." Overdubbing and mixing took place over the summer, with all work on the song completed by 13 September.

== Release and reception ==
Thirty Three & 1/3 was released in November 1976, with "See Yourself" appearing as the final track on side one of the original LP format, sequenced after the album's lead single, "This Song". As with "Dear One", Harrison dedicated the song to Paramhansa Yogananda on the album cover. During his extensive promotion for Thirty Three & 1/3, Harrison visited US secretary of state Henry Kissinger in Washington DC and presented him with a copy of Yogananda's Autobiography of a Yogi, one of Harrison's favourite books.

The release coincided with a wave of renewed interest in the Beatles' work, sparked by EMI/Capitol Records reissuing the band's catalog following the demise of Apple. Music critics praised Thirty Three & 1/3 as Harrison's finest album since All Things Must Pass, and wrote approvingly of the more subtle tone of his spiritual message compared with the perceived preachiness of Living in the Material World (1973) and Dark Horse (1974). Author Robert Rodriguez comments on the song's release in 1976: "Whereas in the past, George might have been a little more heavy-handed in his criticism of hypocrisy, here he slaps back gently."

In a review for Melody Maker, Ray Coleman wrote of the subject matter of "See Yourself" and other songs on Thirty Three & 1/3: "This isn't a very 'immediate' record ... But as proved by All Things Must Pass, Harrison's material is deep and requires the listener to persevere. Two or three spins bring out a musical and lyrical warmth from an artist who refuses to stand still." In his 1977 book The Beatles Forever, Nicholas Schaffner described the "tastefulness" of Harrison's performance on synthesizer as "unmatched in rock". Referring to Harrison's gift to Kissinger in November 1976, in relation to the era when the song was written, Schaffner added: "Another sign of the times, perhaps. Back in 1964 even the thought of such a meeting would have been preposterous; in 1967 it would have seemed the pinnacle of the surreal."

On an album that he considers "a renewal" and "one of Harrison's best", Simon Leng describes "See Yourself" as "the least interesting track". While acknowledging the "adventurous" quality of the song's time signature, Leng views the arrangement as "too ponderous" and the melody "mostly bland". Another Harrison biographer, theologian Dale Allison, describes the song as "A call to serious self-examination ... it recalls the earlier and better 'Run Of The Mill.'"

In the 2005 publication NME Originals: Beatles – The Solo Years 1970–1980, Adrian Thrills names "See Yourself" as a highlight of Thirty Three & 1/3, an album that was an "upbeat affair that seemed to restore Harrison's love for music". Writing for Mojo magazine, John Harris describes the song as "a revived lost oldie" and "an intriguingly sympathetic look at Paul's 1967 admission that he'd taken acid".

== Personnel ==
- George Harrison – vocals, acoustic guitars, synthesizer, tambourine, backing vocals
- Billy Preston – pianos, synthesizer
- Gary Wright – keyboards, synthesizer
- Willie Weeks – bass
- Alvin Taylor – drums

== Sources ==
- Dale C. Allison Jr., The Love There That's Sleeping: The Art and Spirituality of George Harrison, Continuum (New York, NY, 2006; ISBN 978-0-8264-1917-0).
- Keith Badman, The Beatles Diary Volume 2: After the Break-Up 1970–2001, Omnibus Press (London, 2001; ISBN 0-7119-8307-0).
- The Beatles, Anthology, Chronicle Books (San Francisco, CA, 2000; ISBN 0-8118-2684-8).
- Roy Carr & Tony Tyler, The Beatles: An Illustrated Record, Trewin Copplestone Publishing (London, 1978; ISBN 0-450-04170-0).
- Alan Clayson, George Harrison, Sanctuary (London, 2003; ISBN 1-86074-489-3).
- Stephen Davis, Old Gods Almost Dead: The 40-Year Odyssey of the Rolling Stones, Broadway Books (New York, NY, 2001; ISBN 0-7679-0312-9).
- Peter Doggett, You Never Give Me Your Money: The Beatles After the Breakup, It Books (New York, NY, 2011; ISBN 978-0-06-177418-8).
- The Editors of Rolling Stone, Harrison, Rolling Stone Press/Simon & Schuster (New York, NY, 2002; ISBN 0-7432-3581-9).
- Geoffrey Giuliano, Dark Horse: The Life and Art of George Harrison, Da Capo Press (Cambridge, MA, 1997; ISBN 0-306-80747-5).
- George Harrison, I Me Mine, Chronicle Books (San Francisco, CA, 2002; ISBN 0-8118-3793-9).
- Mark Hertsgaard, A Day in the Life: The Music and Artistry of the Beatles, Pan Books (London, 1996; ISBN 0-330-33891-9).
- Elliot J. Huntley, Mystical One: George Harrison – After the Break-up of the Beatles, Guernica Editions (Toronto, ON, 2006; ISBN 1-55071-197-0).
- Ian Inglis, The Words and Music of George Harrison, Praeger (Santa Barbara, CA, 2010; ISBN 978-0-313-37532-3).
- Peter Lavezzoli, The Dawn of Indian Music in the West, Continuum (New York, NY, 2006; ISBN 0-8264-2819-3).
- Simon Leng, While My Guitar Gently Weeps: The Music of George Harrison, Hal Leonard (Milwaukee, WI, 2006; ISBN 1-4234-0609-5).
- Ian MacDonald, Revolution in the Head: The Beatles' Records and the Sixties, Pimlico (London, 1998; ISBN 0-7126-6697-4).
- Chip Madinger & Mark Easter, Eight Arms to Hold You: The Solo Beatles Compendium, 44.1 Productions (Chesterfield, MO, 2000; ISBN 0-615-11724-4).
- Barry Miles, The Beatles Diary Volume 1: The Beatles Years, Omnibus Press (London, 2001; ISBN 0-7119-8308-9).
- Philip Norman, John Lennon: The Life, Ecco (New York, NY, 2009; ISBN 978-0-06-075402-0).
- Robert Rodriguez, Fab Four FAQ 2.0: The Beatles' Solo Years, 1970–1980, Backbeat Books (Milwaukee, WI, 2010; ISBN 978-1-4165-9093-4).
- Nicholas Schaffner, The Beatles Forever, McGraw-Hill (New York, NY, 1978; ISBN 0-07-055087-5).
- Howard Sounes, Fab: An Intimate Life of Paul McCartney, HarperCollins (London, 2010; ISBN 978-0-00-723705-0).
- Gary Tillery, Working Class Mystic: A Spiritual Biography of George Harrison, Quest Books (Wheaton, IL, 2011; ISBN 978-0-8356-0900-5).
- Bob Woffinden, The Beatles Apart, Proteus (London, 1981; ISBN 0-906071-89-5).
