= Pure Smokey (song) =

- 1977 single face label

Song by George Harrison

from the album Thirty Three & 1/3
- Released: 19 November 1976
- Genre: Soul, jazz rock
- Length: 3:56
- Label: Dark Horse
- Songwriter(s): George Harrison
- Producer(s): George Harrison with Tom Scott

"Pure Smokey" is a song by English musician George Harrison, released in 1976 on his debut album for Dark Horse Records, Thirty Three & 1/3. The song was the second of Harrison's musical tributes to American soul singer Smokey Robinson, following "Ooh Baby (You Know That I Love You)" in 1975. Harrison frequently cited Robinson as one of his favourite vocalists and songwriters, and Robinson's group the Miracles had similarly influenced the Beatles during the 1960s. In the lyrics to "Pure Smokey", Harrison gives thanks for the gift of Robinson's music, while making a statement regarding the importance of expressing appreciation and gratitude, rather than forgetting to do so and later regretting it. The song title came from the name of Robinson's 1974 album Pure Smokey.

Harrison recorded "Pure Smokey" at his Friar Park home studio in Henley, Oxfordshire. Jazz musician Tom Scott provided production assistance and the song features musical contributions from Scott, Richard Tee, Willie Weeks and Alvin Taylor, together with a pair of highly regarded guitar solos from Harrison. Several reviewers recognise the song as superior to "Ooh Baby", due in part to its more authentic musical setting; Harrison biographer Simon Leng views the track as its composer's most successful excursion in the soul music genre. "Pure Smokey" appeared as the B-side to the second single from Thirty Three & 1/3 in the UK, which was Harrison's cover of the Cole Porter standard "True Love".

== Background and composition ==
During the Beatles' career, according to author Ian MacDonald, George Harrison had served as the band's "scout" regarding new American music, particularly soul music. In 1975, Harrison released Extra Texture, his most soul-influenced album, with songs such as "You", "Can't Stop Thinking About You" and "The Answer's at the End" all demonstrating his adoption of the genre. Another track, "Ooh Baby (You Know That I Love You)", was a homage to "Ooo Baby Baby" by Smokey Robinson, the Miracles' lead singer whose music had a considerable influence on Harrison and John Lennon during the 1960s. (Note: In return, Robinson was one of many artists to cover Harrison's Beatles composition "Something", a version that, like James Brown's soul reading, impressed Harrison considerably more than Frank Sinatra's more-public adoption of the song in his live repertoire.) Among the frequent compliments he paid the American singer in interviews, Harrison often praised Robinson as a songwriter, noting in his 1980 autobiography, I Me Mine: "one tends to forget how many good tunes he has written." After coming up with the song's "nice chord changes", as he puts it in I Me Mine, Harrison wrote a more personal musical tribute to Robinson in 1975, titled "Pure Smokey" after Robinson's 1974 album of the same name.

In the lyrics to the song's first verse, Harrison acknowledges the tendency to forget to show appreciation for something:

Throughout my lifetimes I'd hesitate
I'd feel some joy, but before I've shown my thanks
It became too late
And now all the way I want to find the time
To stop to say
I want to thank you Lord for giving us each new day.

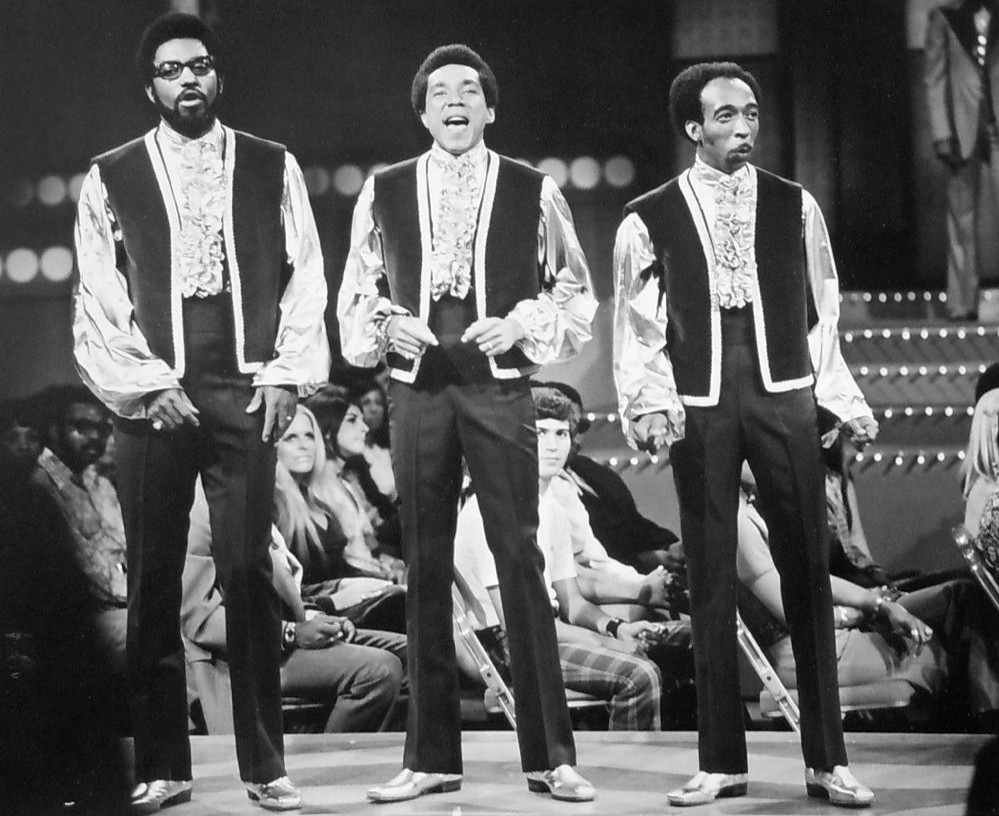
Smokey Robinson (centre) and the Miracles performing on a 1970 TV special

I've always liked Smokey Robinson and he's probably one of the best songwriters around ... I'm trying to make the point – if I like someone I want to say "I like you". I don't want [for them] to die and then to think "Oh, I forgot to tell them I liked them" ... So this song turned into an all purpose thing of generally trying to show appreciation, and then to focus on my appreciation of Smokey.

– George Harrison, 1979

He then refers to all those who have influenced and inspired him musically, in the line "Love that's filled my ears", before stating: "I want to thank you Lord for giving us Pure Smokey." Harrison offers further praise for Robinson's music in the words "Now anyone who hears, hears that voice so free", and in the same middle eight he references the Miracles' hit song "You've Really Got a Hold on Me". The latter was written by Robinson and, through the Beatles' 1963 cover version, which Robinson himself endorsed in a 1968 interview, one of Harrison's earliest recorded lead vocals (as a duet with Lennon). (Note: An enduring favourite of Harrison's, "You've Really Got a Hold on Me" was among the covers rehearsed by the Beatles in January 1969 for what became their Let It Be album and film (1970). In 1987, Harrison name-checked the song again, in the words to his Cloud Nine track "When We Was Fab".)

In the song's final verse, Harrison compliments what he would describe in a 1987 Musician interview as Robinson's "effortless butterfly of a voice", as well as his willingness to experiment as an artist:

Singing it so sweetly like no one else can do
Always trying something new
And I thank you Lord for giving us Pure Smokey.

Harrison biographer Simon Leng comments that musically the song reflects "many years' flipping of Atlantic and Stax classics" by Harrison, as well as his work over 1969–70 with two soul/R&B artists signed to the Beatles' Apple record label, Billy Preston and Doris Troy. (Note: As musical projects that were important precursors to his 1970 triple album All Things Must Pass, Harrison collaborated variously as producer, musician and songwriter with Preston on That's the Way God Planned It (1969) and Encouraging Words (1970), and with Troy on her sole album for Apple, Doris Troy (1970).) Christian theologian Dale Allison describes "Pure Smokey" as a "prayer of thanks to God for the music of Smokey Robinson".

== Recording ==
Having fulfilled his contractual obligations to EMI-affiliated Apple Records with Extra Texture, Harrison recorded "Pure Smokey" for his debut album on his Dark Horse record label, Thirty Three & 1/3. Beginning in May 1976, the album sessions took place at FPSHOT, Harrison's home studio at Friar Park in Henley-on-Thames, Oxfordshire. The musicians accompanying him on the track were jazz saxophonist and arranger Tom Scott, Richard Tee on Fender Rhodes piano, bassist Willie Weeks and drummer Alvin Taylor. The latter had recently played on 2nd Resurrection by Chicago soul group the Stairsteps, one of a number of acts signed to Dark Horse Records since 1974. Together with the Taylor–Weeks rhythm section, Scott's role as assistant producer on Thirty Three & 1/3 gave the album a sound that was more authentic in the American soul genre compared with Harrison's self-produced Extra Texture. (Note: Following the poorly received Extra Texture, Harrison had expressed a desire to work with a co-producer in future, and Scott's assistance marked the first time that Harrison had shared production on one of his solo albums since working alongside Phil Spector in 1970–71. With concurrent commitments as musical director on the hit TV series Starsky and Hutch, Scott was unable to commit to a full co-producer's role on Thirty Three & 1/3.) Author Michael Frontani describes Taylor and Weeks as "one of the best rhythm sections to appear on a Harrison album".

The released recording begins with a gradual fade-in, creating an effect that author Elliot Huntley describes as "shimmering". Over this introduction and during the mid-song instrumental break, Harrison overdubbed electric guitar solos that mark a rare departure from his traditional preference for slide guitar soloing throughout his post-Beatles solo career. Overdubs on the track, including Harrison's backing vocals and Scott's various horn parts, were completed by 13 September 1976, after Harrison had been waylaid with hepatitis for much of the summer.

== Release and reception ==
Thirty Three & 1/3 was released in November 1976, with "Pure Smokey" appearing as track 3 on side two of the original LP format, sequenced between Harrison's remake of the Cole Porter standard "True Love" and "Crackerbox Palace". As with "Ooh Baby" on Extra Texture, the album cover included text dedicating the song to Robinson. In Britain, "Pure Smokey" appeared as the B-side to the second single off Thirty Three & 1/3, "True Love", issued in February 1977.

Music critics praised Thirty Three & 1/3 as Harrison's finest work since All Things Must Pass, and noted the quality of the production after the more downbeat Dark Horse (1974) and Extra Texture. In a review for Melody Maker, Ray Coleman listed the song among "plenty of high-spots" on the album and commented: "Interesting to observe from this how flexible George's vocal styles have now become: he handles ['Pure Smokey'] with a black soul feeling, showing commendable understanding, but without resorting to embarrassing copying techniques." Although he admired Harrison's guitar work throughout the album, the NME's Bob Woffinden derided its lyrics and opined that a second Robinson tribute in as many years "serves to delineate even more his inability to find fresh material and themes". Writing in The Beatles Forever in 1977, Nicholas Schaffner included "Pure Smokey" as an example of Thirty Three & 1/3's standing as "the most varied and tuneful collection of Harrison melodies to date" and described the song as "similar to Extra Texture's 'Ooh Baby' but better".

That was a wonderful, flattering thing for him to feel like that, and to write about it [in "Pure Smokey"], so that the world could know that he felt like that. It was wonderful to me, and I'm very flattered by that.

– Smokey Robinson, 2014

Among other Beatles biographers, "Pure Smokey" is viewed as superior to Harrison's previous Robinson tribute. Simon Leng considers "Pure Smokey" to be both "the most successful, and succinct, summation of his attachments to the [soul] genre" and "one of its author's most appealing songs". Leng praises Harrison's guitar solos for their understated, melodic approach – in which he detects "a nod to Eric Clapton, but with added Carl Perkins twang" – and concludes: "A fact often overlooked is that none of the other Beatles came close to offering convincing soul moods, whereas they were a fundamental part of the Dark Horse's musical vocabulary." Ian Inglis summarises "Pure Smokey" as "a wonderful example of Harrison's obvious affection for sweet soul, both as a singer and a songwriter", and includes it among lesser-known Harrison compositions such as "Your Love Is Forever", "Life Itself" and "That's the Way It Goes", all of which are "often overlooked" yet possess "great charm, energy, and beauty".

In the 2005 publication NME Originals: Beatles – The Solo Years 1970–1980, Adrian Thrills named "Pure Smokey" and "See Yourself" as two highlights of Thirty Three & 1/3 and placed the former track seventh in his list of Harrison's "ten solo gems". Former Mojo editor Mat Snow includes "Pure Smokey" and "True Love" among the "standouts" on an album that found its creator with "his groove back". Snow describes the track as "the soul fan George's second and best tribute to the Motown legend". Speaking to the music website HazyRock in 2014, Robinson said that he had got to know Harrison in Los Angeles during the 1970s and he was still "very flattered" by the song.

== Personnel ==
- George Harrison – vocals, electric guitars, backing vocals
- Richard Tee – electric piano
- Tom Scott – saxophones, horn arrangement
- Willie Weeks – bass
- Alvin Taylor – drums

== Sources ==
- Dale C. Allison Jr., The Love There That's Sleeping: The Art and Spirituality of George Harrison, Continuum (New York, NY, 2006; ISBN 978-0-8264-1917-0).
- Keith Badman, The Beatles Diary Volume 2: After the Break-Up 1970–2001, Omnibus Press (London, 2001; ISBN 0-7119-8307-0).
- Roy Carr & Tony Tyler, The Beatles: An Illustrated Record, Trewin Copplestone Publishing (London, 1978; ISBN 0-450-04170-0).
- Alan Clayson, George Harrison, Sanctuary (London, 2003; ISBN 1-86074-489-3).
- The Editors of Rolling Stone, Harrison, Rolling Stone Press/Simon & Schuster (New York, NY, 2002; ISBN 0-7432-3581-9).
- Michael Frontani, "The Solo Years", in Kenneth Womack (ed.), The Cambridge Companion to the Beatles, Cambridge University Press (Cambridge, UK, 2009; ISBN 978-1-139-82806-2), pp. 153–82.
- George Harrison, I Me Mine, Chronicle Books (San Francisco, CA, 2002; ISBN 0-8118-3793-9).
- Elliot J. Huntley, Mystical One: George Harrison – After the Break-up of the Beatles, Guernica Editions (Toronto, ON, 2006; ISBN 1-55071-197-0).
- Ian Inglis, The Words and Music of George Harrison, Praeger (Santa Barbara, CA, 2010; ISBN 978-0-313-37532-3).
- Simon Leng, While My Guitar Gently Weeps: The Music of George Harrison, Hal Leonard (Milwaukee, WI, 2006; ISBN 1-4234-0609-5).
- Ian MacDonald, Revolution in the Head: The Beatles' Records and the Sixties, Pimlico (London, 1998; ISBN 0-7126-6697-4).
- Chip Madinger & Mark Easter, Eight Arms to Hold You: The Solo Beatles Compendium, 44.1 Productions (Chesterfield, MO, 2000; ISBN 0-615-11724-4).
- Robert Rodriguez, Fab Four FAQ 2.0: The Beatles' Solo Years, 1970–1980, Backbeat Books (Milwaukee, WI, 2010; ISBN 978-1-4165-9093-4).
- Nicholas Schaffner, The Beatles Forever, McGraw-Hill (New York, NY, 1978; ISBN 0-07-055087-5).
- Mat Snow, The Beatles Solo: The Illustrated Chronicles of John, Paul, George, and Ringo After The Beatles (Volume 3: George), Race Point Publishing (New York, NY, 2013; ISBN 978-1-937994-26-6).
- Bruce Spizer, The Beatles Solo on Apple Records, 498 Productions (New Orleans, LA, 2005; ISBN 0-9662649-5-9).
- Gary Tillery, Working Class Mystic: A Spiritual Biography of George Harrison, Quest Books (Wheaton, IL, 2011; ISBN 978-0-8356-0900-5).
- Bob Woffinden, The Beatles Apart, Proteus (London, 1981; ISBN 0-906071-89-5).
