= Sue Me, Sue You Blues =

1972 single by George Harrison

Song by George Harrison

from the album Living in the Material World
- Published: 1972 (Harrisongs)
- Released: 30 May 1973
- Recorded: 3 October 1972
- Genre: Rock, blues
- Length: 4:48
- Label: Apple
- Songwriter(s): George Harrison
- Producer(s): George Harrison

"Sue Me, Sue You Blues" is a song written by English musician George Harrison, released on his 1973 album Living in the Material World. Harrison initially let American guitarist Jesse Ed Davis record it for the latter's Ululu album (1972), in gratitude to Davis for his participation in the Concert for Bangladesh. When writing the song, Harrison drew inspiration from the legal issues surrounding the Beatles during the early months of 1971, particularly the lawsuit that Paul McCartney initiated in an effort to dissolve the band's business partnership, Apple Corps.

The inclusion of "Sue Me, Sue You Blues" on Material World marked a rare example of a secular composition on Harrison's most spiritually oriented album. Recorded at the Beatles' Apple Studio in London, the track features his extensive use of the Dobro-style resonator guitar, as well as musical contributions from Gary Wright, Nicky Hopkins, Klaus Voormann and Jim Keltner. The song's musical mood and lyric recall aspects of old English square dance, a quality that some writers identify as mirroring the changing of sides amid the lawsuits relating to the Beatles' break-up. Some critics have compared the track with John Lennon's "How Do You Sleep?"; Stephen Holden of Rolling Stone magazine described it as a "clever Lennonist diatribe".

Harrison performed "Sue Me, Sue You Blues" throughout his 1974 North American tour, utilising a funk-inspired arrangement that featured musicians Willie Weeks, Andy Newmark and Tom Scott. For these performances, Harrison modified the lyrics to reflect the former Beatles uniting against manager Allen Klein. The song's title was a phrase that Harrison and commentators adopted when referring to Beatles-related legal issues during the 1970s. A film clip containing Harrison's 1971 demo of "Sue Me, Sue You Blues" appeared on the DVD accompanying the 2006 remaster of Living in the Material World.

== Background and composition ==
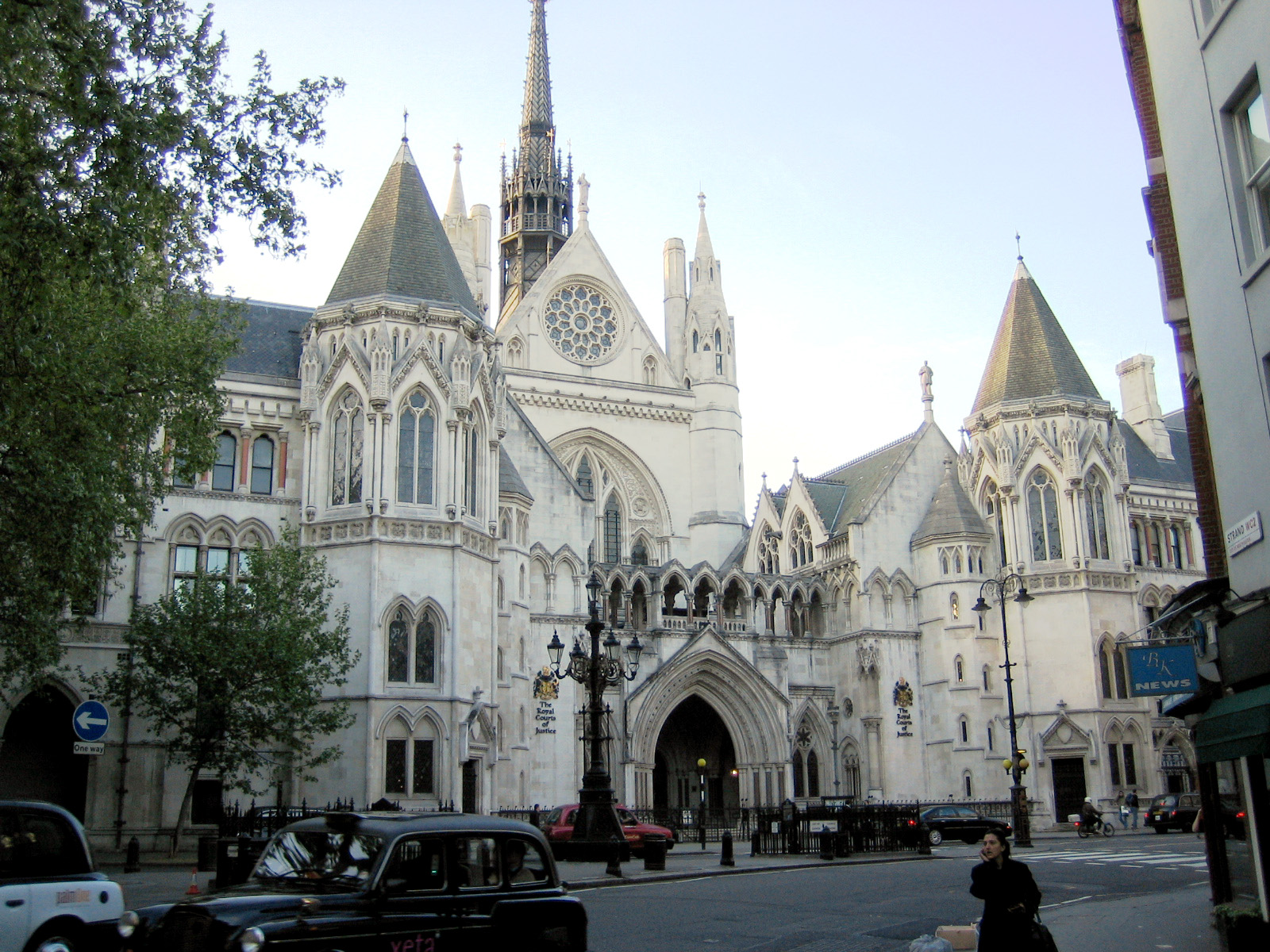
London's Royal Courts of Justice, where Paul McCartney sued his former bandmates in order to dissolve the Beatles' partnership

As third songwriter to Lennon and McCartney, George Harrison had written about his experiences regarding the disharmonious atmosphere within the Beatles during the late 1960s, in compositions such as "Not Guilty", "I Me Mine", "Wah-Wah" and "Run of the Mill". The latter two songs, which reflect on the failing friendships among the Beatles, appeared on Harrison's critically acclaimed triple album All Things Must Pass, released in November 1970, seven months after Paul McCartney's departure had initiated the band's break-up. On 31 December of that year, McCartney filed suit against Apple Corps and his former bandmates at London's High Court of Justice, in an effort to free himself from the legal obligations imposed on him by the Beatles' partnership, and particularly from manager Allen Klein. Author Robert Rodriguez describes the situation as an "unfathomably sour turn of events" that "mystified" the public and angered fans of the Beatles.

Around that time we had millions of suits flying here, flying there, George wrote the "Sue Me, Sue You Blues" about it. I'd kicked it all off originally, having to sue the other three Beatles in the High Court, and that opened Pandora's box. After that everybody just seemed to be suing everybody.

– Paul McCartney to Rolling Stone, 1973

Beginning on 19 February 1971, the court heard reports from Harrison, John Lennon and Ringo Starr of McCartney's attempts to control the band, and McCartney's equally unflattering assessment of Klein. Although the other three former Beatles had presented a united front against McCartney since his April 1970 departure from the band, the recent publication of Lennon's scathing comments to Rolling Stone editor Jann Wenner, about McCartney, Harrison and Starr, added to the ill-feeling surrounding the group. (Note: Inspired by his months of Primal Therapy treatment, Lennon also targeted Bob Dylan, Mick Jagger, Beatles aides Derek Taylor and Neil Aspinall, and the band's record producer, George Martin. The interview with Wenner initiated a year-long war of words between Lennon and McCartney, carried out partly in the letters pages of Melody Maker and musically in their solo recordings, particularly in Lennon's 1971 song "How Do You Sleep?")

On 12 March, High Court judge Mr Justice Stamp ruled in McCartney's favour, appointing London accountant James Spooner as Apple Corps' official receiver. While Lennon reportedly unleashed his anger that day by throwing two bricks through the windows of McCartney's St John's Wood home, Harrison channelled his frustration into a new composition, "Sue Me, Sue You Blues". Harrison biographer Simon Leng suggests that the song "takes a nearly impersonal overview of the Beatles' self-inflicted legal wounds". In his 1980 autobiography, I, Me, Mine, Harrison describes the opening verse as being "vaguely based on the Square dance type of fiddle lyric":

Well, you serve me and I'll serve you
Swing your partners, all get screwed
Bring your lawyer and I'll bring mine
Get together, and we could have a bad time

In Leng's opinion, the song's lyrics "revel in the certainty that lawyers are an easy target for general scorn and a quick way of securing a common denominator". During the second verse, the line "It's affidavit swearing time" reflects real-life events – whereby Harrison, Lennon and Starr all submitted their statements to the court via affidavit – before Harrison concludes: "Now all that's left is to find yourself a new band." In the third verse, Harrison predicts the eventual outcome of the lawsuit:

Hold the block on money flow
Move it into joint escrow
Court receiver, laughs and thrills
But in the end we just pay those lawyers their bills

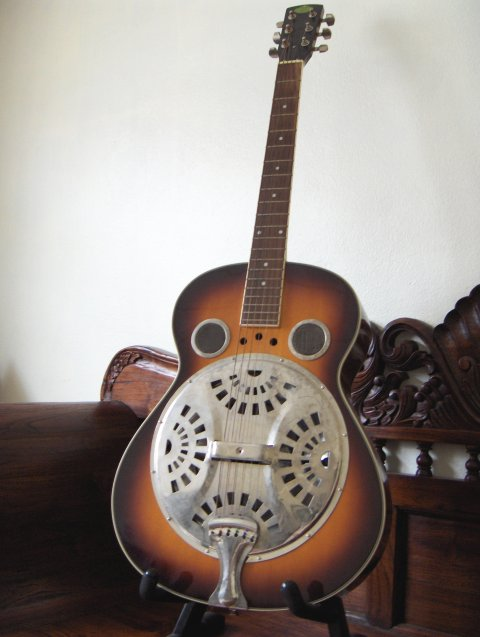
A resonator guitar, similar to the instrument played by Harrison on the recording

Author Ian Inglis identifies Harrison's use of the plural form "we" in the lyric as evidence of his hope for "a shared and sensible outcome" for the former Beatles, since the situation "disadvantages them all". (Note: After Apple went into receivership, McCartney's advisers endorsed the same cautious approach regarding potential tax liability that Klein had adopted, and the partnership could not be dismantled immediately, as McCartney had believed. Reflecting on the expense of years of ongoing negotiation and litigation, McCartney told Mojo magazine in 1996: "We put every lawyer's kid through school.") While Harrison biographer Dale Allison interprets a degree of animosity towards the other Beatles in the song's lyrics, Leng argues that they are directed solely at the legal profession. Inglis similarly dismisses the idea that Harrison was targeting his former bandmates; instead, the song expresses "frustration rather than hostility" and addresses the "absurdity" of the situation. Inglis writes of "Sue Me, Sue You Blues": "It makes clear that amid the legal arguments, financial requirements, and technical language ... there are four former friends who are powerless to control events."

Regarding the song's square-dance theme, Leng suggests that folk dancing's cycle of about-turns and to-and-fro movement reminded Harrison of the Beatles' "seemingly endless, and pointless, legal orbits around one another". The song's lyrics are set against a blues-based bottleneck riff, typical of Harrison's work at the time with the dobro. Played in his favoured open E tuning, "Sue Me, Sue You Blues" was one of a number of bottleneck-inspired Harrison compositions from the early 1970s. (Note: Others examples include "Woman Don't You Cry for Me", "Māya Love" and "Hari's on Tour (Express)".)

The song title soon became part of regular Harrison parlance, as evidenced by his appearance on The Dick Cavett Show in November 1971, when he used the phrase to goad Capitol Records boss Bhaskar Menon over delaying the release of the Concert for Bangladesh live album. (Note: "We're going to play the sue me, sue you blues," Harrison said, threatening to offer the album's US distribution to a rival record company. Seated beside a nervous Dick Cavett, Harrison then raised a fist and added: "Sue me, Bhaskar!") Commentators similarly adopted "sue me, sue you blues" as a description for the litigation surrounding Harrison and his fellow ex-Beatles throughout the 1970s. (Note: Legal issues also served as Harrison's inspiration for his 1976 composition "This Song", a send-up of the copyright infringement suit launched by music publisher Bright Tunes regarding his 1970–71 hit song "My Sweet Lord".)

== Pre-Living in the Material World recording history ==
=== Harrison's solo demo ===
Harrison recorded a brief demo of "Sue Me, Sue You Blues", in the Delta blues style, which became available in the 1990s on bootleg compilations such as Pirate Songs. Leng describes this 1971 recording as "astonishing" and a "must" for inclusion on any forthcoming George Harrison anthology, with Harrison sounding like "a lost bluesman, bootlegged in Chicago".

The demo was officially issued in September 2006, on the DVD included in the deluxe edition of Harrison's remastered 1973 solo album, Living in the Material World. The song is set to archival footage, showing images of Harrison's National resonator guitar, over which his handwritten lyrics are superimposed. In the opinion of Music Box editor John Metzger, this version of "Sue Me, Sue You Blues" "stings more than its studio counterpart". Although the 2006 reissue lists it as an "acoustic demo version", Harrison played electric slide guitar on the recording. The same film clip appears on the DVD exclusive to the Apple Years 1968–75 Harrison box set, released in September 2014.

=== Jesse Ed Davis's version ===
"Sue Me, Sue You Blues"

Single by Jesse Ed Davis

from the album Ululu
- B-side: "My Captain"
- Released: 25 January 1972
- Genre: Rock, blues
- Length: 2:45
- Label: Atco
- Songwriter(s): George Harrison
- Producer(s): Jesse Ed Davis, Albhy Galuten

Harrison met Tulsa-born guitarist Jesse Ed Davis through mutual friends, singer-songwriter Leon Russell and drummer Jim Keltner, both of whom took part in the hastily arranged session for Harrison's "Bangla Desh" charity single in July 1971. Russell also assisted Harrison in recruiting personnel for the associated benefit concerts, held at Madison Square Garden in New York, and suggested Davis as a replacement for Eric Clapton, who was then dealing with a severe heroin addiction. Both Davis and Clapton ended up playing at the two shows, on 1 August. In gratitude to Davis, Harrison offered him "Sue Me, Sue You Blues" for inclusion on his second solo album, Ululu.

A former guitarist with blues singer Taj Mahal, Davis arranged the song as a Southern blues shuffle, creating a "beautiful version" in the words of music critic Thom Jurek. As on the 1971 demo, which Harrison had passed on to Davis, this version of "Sue Me, Sue You Blues" omits the song's third verse and, at just 2 minutes 45 seconds, it is significantly shorter than Harrison's better-known 1973 recording. Other musicians on Davis's version include Keltner, Dr. John and Billy Rich. Like Keltner, Davis went on to work with all the former Beatles except McCartney during the 1970s, remaining close to Harrison and playing regularly with Lennon over the 1973–75 period.

Ululu was released in March 1972, before which Atco Records had issued "Sue Me, Sue You Blues" as the album's advance single on 25 January. Davis co-produced the recording with Grammy Award-winning producer Albhy Galuten. In an interview with Los Angeles Free Press the following year, Davis expressed disappointment with his two albums on the Atco label and named "Sue Me, Sue You Blues" as one of the few songs he liked.

== Living in the Material World recording ==
Harrison returned to the song in December 1972, during a break in the sessions for his Living in the Material World album, the start of which had been delayed by the various business and tax problems connected with his Concert for Bangladesh aid project. By this time, Harrison, Lennon and Starr had grown disaffected with manager Allen Klein and had chosen not to renew his contract. (Note: In the words of Beatles biographer Peter Doggett, Harrison was "alarmed by the morass into which the Bangladesh project had fallen". Klein had failed to establish Harrison's 1971 charity concerts as UNICEF fundraisers up front, resulting in unforeseen tax liability on the live album and concert film, and an IRS audit of Apple's accounts. In addition, press reports during 1972 claimed that Klein's ABKCO organisation had taken excessive commissions from the proceeds.) Once album sessions resumed in January 1973, Harrison taped the basic track for "Sue Me, Sue You Blues" at the Beatles' Apple Studio, in central London.

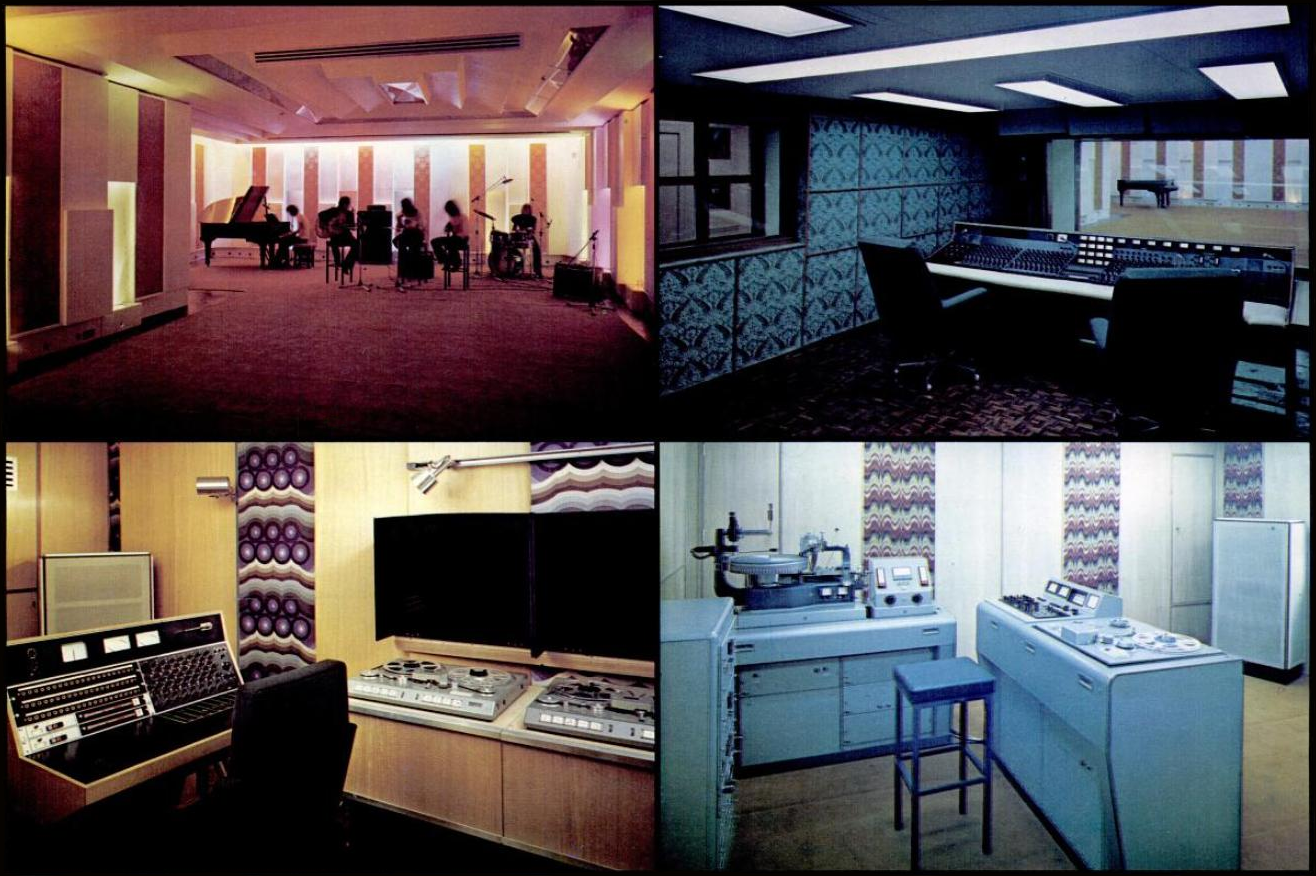
Apple Studio, where Harrison recorded "Sue Me, Sue You Blues"

Harrison was backed on the recording by Keltner on drums, keyboard players Gary Wright and Nicky Hopkins, and bassist Klaus Voormann. (Note: Voormann was a regular contributor to solo projects by Harrison, Lennon and Starr during much of the 1970s.) These musicians provided the core line-up throughout the Material World sessions, in a deliberate move by Harrison to work with a small band and pare down the production after the excesses of All Things Must Pass.

The recording begins with the song's single-chord riff, created by a combination of Hopkins' low piano notes and Harrison's dobro, before the rhythm shifts to what author Alan Clayson calls "downbeat hootenanny" over the verses. Leng identifies the rhythm as approximating the do-si-do dance step found in square dancing. Harrison takes the first solo, midway through the track, playing a second, overdubbed dobro, while Wright's Wurlitzer electric piano leads the instrumental passage that closes the song. Contrasting with his more substantial presence on All Things Must Pass, "Sue Me, Sue You Blues" marks a rare instance where Wright's keyboard work, rather than just Hopkins', features prominently on Living in the Material World.

Harrison completed the song's vocals by late February, soon after his 30th birthday. He then travelled to Los Angeles for a series of Beatles-related business meetings held at the offices of Apple's US distributor, Capitol Records, primarily to discuss the upcoming Beatles compilations 1962–1966 and 1967–1970. While these two double albums were intended to foil bootleggers, Doggett notes that the profits financed the Beatles' litigation against Klein until well into 1974. (Note: Among the numerous suits he brought against his former clients during 1973–74, Klein attempted to gain control of the US arm of Harrison's music publishing company, Harrisongs. "Sue Me, Sue You Blues" was one of only two songs on Material World assigned directly to Harrisongs, the majority of the album's compositions having been registered with Harrison's recently formed Material World Charitable Foundation.)

== Release ==
"Sue Me, Sue You Blues" was issued at the end of May 1973 as the second track on Living in the Material World, following the album's lead single, "Give Me Love (Give Me Peace on Earth)". According to authors Chip Madinger and Mark Easter, Harrison considered an alternative running order, whereby "Sue Me, Sue You Blues" was track 1 and "Give Me Love" opened side two of the album. In the UK cassette format, "Sue Me, Sue You Blues" was the opening track, followed by "The Lord Loves the One (That Loves the Lord)".

The song's inclusion marked the only secular composition on Material World. It also served as a rare foray into rock amid the album's abundance of spiritually themed ballads and occasional acoustic-based pop such as "Give Me Love" and "Don't Let Me Wait Too Long". Reflecting the album content, Tom Wilkes's design for the record's face labels contrasted a devout spiritual existence with life in the material world, by featuring a painting of Krishna and his warrior prince Arjuna on side one and a picture of a Mercedes stretch limousine on the reverse.

Regarded by some as the most level-headed and musically consistent ex-Beatle in mid 1973, with "Sue Me, Sue You Blues" Harrison provided observers with another example in the band's tradition of self-referential songwriting. Leng has written of the public and the media "long[ing] for these further installments of 'the Beatles soap opera'", of which this song was "less paranoiac" than "How Do You Sleep?" and "not as roseate" as Starr's "Early 1970".

== Reception ==
On release, Billboard magazine noted "Sue Me, Sue You Blues" as a comment on "the Beatles and their mish-mash", while Stephen Holden of Rolling Stone described the track as "a biting slide-guitar showcase for Harrison, its lyric a clever Lennonist diatribe against such monetary quarrels as those that ended the Beatles". In their respective books discussing the former Beatles' first decade as solo artists, Nicholas Schaffner and NME critic Bob Woffinden likewise praised Harrison's dobro playing, Schaffner likening it to the "vicious slide guitar work" Harrison had supplied for Lennon on "How Do You Sleep?" Woffinden compared "Sue Me, Sue You Blues" with Harrison's 1966 Beatles track "Taxman", as a composition that showed its author's "impatien[ce] with those who come between him and his money", and for that reason, found it "rather out of place" on Material World. Recalling the album's release in The Cambridge Companion to the Beatles, Michael Frontani writes: "Harrison's slide-playing is featured throughout, with the swamp-drenched, nocturnal wails of 'Sue Me, Sue You Blues,' in particular, demonstrating his grasp of the form."

Among more recent reviewers, AllMusic's Lindsay Planer draws parallels with Lennon's compositions "How Do You Sleep?" and "Steel and Glass", and describes "Sue Me, Sue You Blues" as a "scathing rocker" in which Harrison "forgoes his trademark arid wit for a decidedly more acerbic and direct approach". To Zeth Lundy of PopMatters, "Sue Me, Sue You Blues" expresses Harrison's "passive-aggressiveness". John Metzger views the lyrics as "ridiculously simplistic" and the track as "perhaps, the most bilious song that [Harrison] ever penned".

AllMusic critic Bruce Eder and Chip Madinger and Mark Easter instead recognise humour in Harrison's lyrics. Writing for Rough Guides, Chris Ingham views this track and "Try Some, Buy Some" as "wry, reasonable digs at symptoms of what Harrison sees as a diseased world", while Hugh Fielder of Classic Rock magazine recognises the song's place on its parent album, in that the legal wrangling "explains his retreat from the material world". Blogcritics' Chaz Lipp considers "the sinewy 'Sue Me, Sue You Blues'" to be among the highlights of Material World and a song that "rank[s] right alongside Harrison's best work".

Among Harrison biographers, Ian Inglis finds an additional comic element in the use of dobro and, like Leng, sees the do-si-do rhythm as an apt musical metaphor for the changing alliances occurring in the courtroom through the early 1970s. Another author who recognises "a good pinch of humour" in the song, Elliot Huntley describes "Sue Me, Sue You Blues" as an "excellent" track, with a "magnificent steel guitar riff". Leng praises the performance of all the musicians on the recording, particularly Keltner, and describes it as "one of Harrison's most accomplished pieces". "It speaks of a very confident, classy musician near the height of his powers", Leng writes, while remarking on the contrast between Harrison in 1972–73 and the "resigned figure" he had portrayed in the Beatles' 1970 documentary film Let It Be.

== Live performance ==
There were other delays for Harrison [before he could commit to touring after the Concert for Bangladesh]: the fuss over the profits from the Bangladesh benefit and album; the McCartney-sue-me, we sue Allen Klein blues …

– Ben Fong-Torres, Rolling Stone, 1974

During an interview midway through Harrison's 1974 North American tour with Ravi Shankar, band leader Tom Scott described "Sue Me, Sue You Blues" as having been a certain inclusion in the setlist from the start of rehearsals, along with "What Is Life", "While My Guitar Gently Weeps" and Lennon's Beatles-era composition "In My Life". Harrison gave "Sue Me, Sue You Blues" a new musical arrangement, the track "reborn as horn-driven funk", Leng writes, via the all-American rhythm section of Willie Weeks and Andy Newmark, and Scott's three-piece horn section. In a feature article for Rolling Stone that otherwise savaged the opening West Coast portion of the Harrison–Shankar tour, Ben Fong-Torres wrote approvingly of its inclusion while bemoaning the paucity of other "familiar Beatles or Harrison songs" in the setlist.

The tour coincided with speculation about a possible Beatles reunion, as well as an agreement regarding the official dissolution of their partnership, which would be ratified following the receipt of all four members' signatures in December 1974. With Starr opting to sign in London, to avoid being subpoenaed by Klein upon entering the United States, Harrison and McCartney provided their signatures in New York on 19 December. (Note: Following advice from his astrologist that "it wasn't the right day", Lennon failed to attend the meeting at New York's Plaza Hotel, much to Harrison's annoyance. Lennon signed the dissolution papers on 27 December, while in Disneyworld in Florida.) Throughout the tour, Harrison changed a line in "Sue Me, Sue You Blues" to reflect the turnaround in his, Lennon's and Starr's allegiances over the previous two years – "Bring your lawyer and I'll bring Klein" name-checking the common enemy of all four ex-Beatles by 1974. Instead of a copy of the Bible, as in the studio versions of the song, Harrison now sang "Hold your Gita in your hand".

Despite his plans for a live album and a concert film, no recording of this or any other Harrison song from the tour has ever received widespread official release. (Note: In what Madinger and Easter describe as "'semi-commercial' issue", live versions of "For You Blue" and "Hari's on Tour (Express)" appeared on EPs accompanying the mail-order-only Songs by George Harrison volumes, published between 1988 and 1992.) A noted performance of "Sue Me, Sue You Blues" appears on bootlegs from his show at Long Beach Arena, where, Leng writes, "the crowd was buzzing", so "set[ting] the tone" for a series of successful concerts in America's Southern states. During this Long Beach performance, on 10 November, Harrison followed his lyric about "find[ing] yourself a new band" with the quip "I think I've got one of those!", reflecting his claim that he was having "too much fun" with his current musicians to consider a Beatles reunion.

== Personnel ==
- George Harrison – lead vocals, dobro, backing vocals
- Nicky Hopkins – piano
- Gary Wright – electric piano
- Klaus Voormann – bass guitar
- Jim Keltner – drums

== Sources ==
- Dale C. Allison Jr., The Love There That's Sleeping: The Art and Spirituality of George Harrison, Continuum (New York, NY, 2006; ISBN 978-0-8264-1917-0).
- Keith Badman, The Beatles Diary Volume 2: After the Break-Up 1970–2001, Omnibus Press (London, 2001; ISBN 978-0-7119-8307-6).
- Harry Castleman & Walter J. Podrazik, All Together Now: The First Complete Beatles Discography 1961–1975, Ballantine Books (New York, NY, 1976; ISBN 0-345-25680-8).
- Alan Clayson, George Harrison, Sanctuary (London, 2003; ISBN 1-86074-489-3).
- Peter Doggett, You Never Give Me Your Money: The Beatles After the Breakup, It Books (New York, NY, 2011; ISBN 978-0-06-177418-8).
- The Editors of Rolling Stone, Harrison, Rolling Stone Press/Simon & Schuster (New York, NY, 2002; ISBN 978-0-7432-3581-5).
- Michael Frontani, "The Solo Years", in Kenneth Womack (ed.), The Cambridge Companion to the Beatles, Cambridge University Press (Cambridge, UK, 2009; ISBN 978-1-139-82806-2), pp. 153–82.
- Joshua M. Greene, Here Comes the Sun: The Spiritual and Musical Journey of George Harrison, John Wiley & Sons (Hoboken, NJ, 2006; ISBN 978-0-470-12780-3).
- George Harrison, I Me Mine, Chronicle Books (San Francisco, CA, 2002; ISBN 978-0-8118-5900-4).
- Mark Hertsgaard, A Day in the Life: The Music and Artistry of the Beatles, Pan Books (London, 1996; ISBN 0-330-33891-9).
- Elliot J. Huntley, Mystical One: George Harrison – After the Break-up of the Beatles, Guernica Editions (Toronto, ON, 2006; ISBN 978-1-55071-197-4).
- Chris Ingham, The Rough Guide to the Beatles, Rough Guides/Penguin (London, 2006; 2nd edn; ISBN 978-1-84836-525-4).
- Ian Inglis, The Words and Music of George Harrison, Praeger (Santa Barbara, CA, 2010; ISBN 978-0-313-37532-3).
- Peter Lavezzoli, The Dawn of Indian Music in the West, Continuum (New York, NY, 2006; ISBN 0-8264-2819-3).
- Simon Leng, While My Guitar Gently Weeps: The Music of George Harrison, Hal Leonard (Milwaukee, WI, 2006; ISBN 978-1-4234-0609-9).
- Chip Madinger & Mark Easter, Eight Arms to Hold You: The Solo Beatles Compendium, 44.1 Productions (Chesterfield, MO, 2000; ISBN 0-615-11724-4).
- Robert Rodriguez, Fab Four FAQ 2.0: The Beatles' Solo Years, 1970–1980, Backbeat Books (Milwaukee, WI, 2010; ISBN 978-1-4165-9093-4).
- Nicholas Schaffner, The Beatles Forever, McGraw-Hill (New York, NY, 1978; ISBN 0-07-055087-5).
- Stan Soocher, Baby You're a Rich Man: Suing the Beatles for Fun and Profit, University Press of New England (Lebanon, NH, 2015; ISBN 978-1-61168-380-6).
- Howard Sounes, Fab: An Intimate Life of Paul McCartney, HarperCollins (London, 2010; ISBN 978-0-00-723705-0).
- Bruce Spizer, The Beatles Solo on Apple Records, 498 Productions (New Orleans, LA, 2005; ISBN 0-9662649-5-9).
- Gary Tillery, Working Class Mystic: A Spiritual Biography of George Harrison, Quest Books (Wheaton, IL, 2011; ISBN 978-0-8356-0900-5).
- Bob Woffinden, The Beatles Apart, Proteus (London, 1981; ISBN 0-906071-89-5).
