= Beautiful Girl (George Harrison song) =

Song by George Harrison

from the album Thirty Three & 1/3
- Released: 19 November 1976
- Genre: Rock, pop
- Length: 3:39
- Label: Dark Horse
- Songwriter(s): George Harrison
- Producer(s): George Harrison with Tom Scott

"Beautiful Girl" is a song by English musician George Harrison, released on his 1976 album Thirty Three & 1/3. Harrison began writing the song in 1969 and considered recording it for his 1970 triple album All Things Must Pass. In its finished, 1976 form, the lyrics of "Beautiful Girl" were inspired by Harrison's second wife, Olivia Arias.

The recording features musical contributions from Billy Preston, Gary Wright and Willie Weeks. Some music critics have noted aspects of the Beatles' mid-'60s sound in "Beautiful Girl"; like much of Thirty Three & 1/3, the song is highly regarded for its melodic qualities. Author Nicholas Schaffner described the track as "a great lost Rubber Soul classic".

== Background and composition ==
In his 1980 autobiography, I, Me, Mine, Harrison states that he began writing "Beautiful Girl" during sessions for singer Doris Troy's eponymous solo album on Apple Records, recording for which commenced in October 1969. Harrison co-produced the album with Troy, and one of the musicians who contributed to the sessions was Stephen Stills, whose "very good" 12-string acoustic guitar Harrison borrowed one evening, during which he came up with the tune to "Beautiful Girl". Harrison's inspiration for the song's lyrics was his wife, Pattie Boyd, but he was unable to write more than a single verse, which begins:

Never seen such a beautiful girl
Got me shaking inside
Calling on me from deep within her eyes ...

After trying out the song at the start of production for All Things Must Pass in May 1970, a month after the Beatles' break-up, "Beautiful Girl" "sank back into the distance", according to Harrison. He returned to the composition in 1976, by which time he had split with Boyd and was living with Olivia Trinidad Arias, his future wife.

Harrison met Arias in October 1974, at a party in Los Angeles, shortly after Boyd had left him for his friend Eric Clapton. Harrison had spoken to her frequently throughout that year, however, since Arias was working as a secretary for A&M Records, and by extension, for his recently launched Dark Horse record label. Intrigued by their daily phone calls, Harrison asked a friend who was visiting A&M's offices to try to obtain a photo of her. Their eventual meeting constituted "the much-fabled 'love at first sight'", according to Beatles author Robert Rodriguez, and the couple "became inseparable". As well as accompanying Harrison throughout his ensuing North American tour with Ravi Shankar, Arias's "dusky Mexican features", in the words of Nicholas Schaffner, "grace[d] the label" of his Dark Horse album, released in December 1974. Like Harrison, Arias was dedicated to a spiritual path aligned with Hinduism, meditation and yoga, and her presence helped him overcome the fallout following that controversial tour, particularly his continued alcoholism that led to a near-fatal bout of hepatitis in mid 1976.

In I, Me, Mine, Harrison acknowledges that when finishing the lyrics to "Beautiful Girl", he "related it then to Olivia". Author Ian Inglis recognises some of the lines in the newly written second verse as both a "fitting description of the freedom and relaxation that had replaced the tension and constraints of his previous life", and an obvious example of Harrison's gratitude to Arias:

Never seen such a beautiful girl
Got me quickly untied
Calling to me she made me realize
...
She has always been there
A lover needed for this soul to survive.

Harrison's musical biographer, Simon Leng, views the structure of the song as typical of its composer's style, where, as in "Isn't It a Pity", "Beware of Darkness" and "Give Me Love", the chorus and verse are one and the same. "On 'Beautiful Girl'," Leng writes, "the main musical hook comes with the first line of the piece, and all the musical themes head back inexorably to that resolution." These themes include the "attractive, rising" bridge sections that lead to a "clever descending series of guitar runs" returning to the verse-chorus.

Speaking to Rolling Stone magazine in early 1979, by which time he and Arias were married and the parents of a newborn son, Dhani, Harrison further acknowledged Arias' positive influence on his life when discussing the despondency behind his Dark Horse song "Simply Shady": "I wasn't ready to join Alcoholics Anonymous or anything – I don't think I was that far gone – but I could put back a bottle of brandy occasionally, plus all the other naughty things that fly around. I just went on a binge ... Then I met Olivia and it all worked out fine." Other Harrison love songs dedicated to Arias include "Dark Sweet Lady" and "Your Love Is Forever", both released on the 1979 album George Harrison.

== Recording ==
Harrison first recorded "Beautiful Girl" on 20 May 1970 at Abbey Road Studios, during a run-through of possible songs for inclusion on All Things Must Pass. With co-producer Phil Spector as his audience, Harrison performed the track solo on acoustic guitar, acknowledging that the composition was unfinished and lacked even a title. The performance of "Beautiful Girl" featured Harrison repeating the words to verse one and vocalising the melody to the song's bridge sections, instead of singing any lyrics. Along with songs that he went on to develop for All Things Must Pass, and others such as "Mother Divine" and "Cosmic Empire" that have yet to be officially released, this early version of "Beautiful Girl" is available on the Beware of ABKCO! bootleg.

The recording sessions for Thirty Three & 1/3, Harrison's first release as a Dark Horse artist, began in May 1976 at his home studio at Friar Park, known as FPSHOT. The musicians accompanying him on the basic track for "Beautiful Girl" were bassist Willie Weeks, drummer Alvin Taylor, Richard Tee on piano and, according to authors Chip Madinger and Mark Easter, keyboard player Gary Wright. In between his touring commitments with the Rolling Stones, Billy Preston overdubbed further keyboard parts, including what AllMusic critic Lindsay Planer terms the song's "billowing organ runs". Jazz saxophonist Tom Scott served as assistant producer on the album, although he did not play on "Beautiful Girl".

Harrison contracted hepatitis shortly after recording the album's backing tracks, and minimal work was carried out until his recovery towards the end of the summer. Over his electric rhythm guitars, Harrison overdubbed two slide-guitar parts for the song's "characteristically fluid" solo. Leng writes of this instrumental passage and the song-closing solo: "['Beautiful Girl'] is boosted by two excellent guitar breaks which, in the coda, even run at a counterpoint to the countermelody."

== Release and reception ==
A&M Records took advantage of Harrison's late completion of the new album, which he was contracted to deliver by 26 July 1976, to launch legal proceedings against him in order to offload the loss-making Dark Horse label. Both parties soon reached an amicable settlement, resulting in Harrison signing a new distribution deal with Warner Bros. Records. Thirty Three & 1/3 was released in mid November, with "Beautiful Girl" appearing as track 3, in between the Paramahansa Yogananda-inspired "Dear One" and the album's lead single, "This Song". Harrison wrote the latter song in response to another source of litigation at this time, the "My Sweet Lord"/"He's So Fine" plagiarism suit.

Music critics praised Thirty Three & 1/3 as a return to form for Harrison, with "Beautiful Girl" a noted example of him having rediscovered the melodic flair that had been lacking on his previous two albums, Dark Horse and Extra Texture. Billboard magazine described the release as "a sunny, upbeat album of love songs and cheerful jokes" and added: "Harrison's often-spectacular melody writing gift gets brilliant display here."

In his 1977 book The Beatles Forever, Schaffner wrote: "Thirty-three and a Third boasts the most varied and tuneful collection of Harrison melodies to date ... and 'Beautiful Girl' could just as easily be an A-1 Beatle tune, a great lost Rubber Soul classic." In a review for Melody Maker that referenced the same 1965 Beatles album, Ray Coleman highlighted the quality of Harrison's vocals and described "Beautiful Girl" as "an especially well-crafted song". "'Dear One' and 'Beautiful Girl'," Coleman continued, "are touching celebrations of love, simply sung to neatly-formed, attractive tunes."

Writing in the 2004 Rolling Stone Album Guide, Mac Randall named "Beautiful Girl" as "one of the many highlights of [Harrison's] upbeat return to pop form". In The Encyclopedia of Popular Music, Colin Larkin describes Thirty Three & 1/3 as "perhaps Harrison's finest album since his landmark debut, All Things Must Pass", and he views "Beautiful Girl" as "a gorgeous love song", which, along with "Dear One", is one of the album's "real highlights" and a song that "could have come straight off of The Beatles' Abbey Road".

Lindsay Planer of AllMusic describes the song as "lovely and lyrical", while Ian Inglis writes: "The confident melody, warm harmonies, and leaping guitar solos combine to produce the kind of uncomplicated and satisfying ballad that he (and Paul McCartney) had produced on The Beatles and Abbey Road." Another Harrison biographer, Elliot Huntley, similarly approves of "Beautiful Girl"'s "enchanting melody" and notes its transformation from the 1970 demo version into "a masterpiece, complete with a thrilling conversational guitar solo", in which the two parts "interweave and answer one another". Leng also recognises the song's Beatle qualities, writing: "'Beautiful Girl' is full of guitar arpeggios and vocal harmonies that might have come straight from Rubber Soul, albeit updated with a 1970s production and the singer's own beguiling guitar statements ... Harrison's melodic gifts have rarely been better showcased."

Having interviewed Harrison for Guitar World magazine in 1987, Rip Rense has discussed the song's guitar solos in the context of how Harrison's playing eschews "pyrotechnic flourishes" for an approach that is instead "thoughtful and original, deceptively simple sounding, invested with feeling". Rense pairs "Beautiful Girl" with the 1981-released "Life Itself" as examples where Harrison's "conversational duet-solos … are impressively imaginative, virtuosic". Author Andrew Grant Jackson includes the track in his book subtitled The Essential Solo Beatles Songs, and writes that "the chiming electric arpeggios perfectly capture the feeling of seeing a beautiful face for the first time."

== Personnel ==
- George Harrison – vocals, electric guitars, slide guitars, backing vocals
- Richard Tee – piano
- Gary Wright – keyboards
- Billy Preston – organ, ARP synthesizer
- Willie Weeks – bass
- Alvin Taylor – drums

== Sources ==
- Keith Badman, The Beatles Diary Volume 2: After the Break-Up 1970–2001, Omnibus Press (London, 2001; ISBN 0-7119-8307-0).
- Nathan Brackett & Christian Hoard (eds), The New Rolling Stone Album Guide (4th edn), Fireside/Simon & Schuster (New York, NY, 2004; ISBN 0-7432-0169-8).
- Alan Clayson, George Harrison, Sanctuary (London, 2003; ISBN 1-86074-489-3).
- The Editors of Rolling Stone, Harrison, Rolling Stone Press/Simon & Schuster (New York, NY, 2002; ISBN 0-7432-3581-9).
- Joshua M. Greene, Here Comes the Sun: The Spiritual and Musical Journey of George Harrison, John Wiley & Sons (Hoboken, NJ, 2006; ISBN 978-0-470-12780-3).
- George Harrison, I Me Mine, Chronicle Books (San Francisco, CA, 2002; ISBN 0-8118-3793-9).
- Elliot J. Huntley, Mystical One: George Harrison – After the Break-up of the Beatles, Guernica Editions (Toronto, ON, 2006; ISBN 1-55071-197-0).
- Ian Inglis, The Words and Music of George Harrison, Praeger (Santa Barbara, CA, 2010; ISBN 978-0-313-37532-3).
- Andrew Grant Jackson, Still the Greatest: The Essential Solo Beatles Songs, Scarecrow Press (Lanham, MD, 2012; ISBN 978-0-8108-8222-5).
- Simon Leng, While My Guitar Gently Weeps: The Music of George Harrison, Hal Leonard (Milwaukee, WI, 2006; ISBN 1-4234-0609-5).
- Chip Madinger & Mark Easter, Eight Arms to Hold You: The Solo Beatles Compendium, 44.1 Productions (Chesterfield, MO, 2000; ISBN 0-615-11724-4).
- Robert Rodriguez, Fab Four FAQ 2.0: The Beatles' Solo Years, 1970–1980, Backbeat Books (Milwaukee, WI, 2010; ISBN 978-1-4165-9093-4).
- Nicholas Schaffner, The Beatles Forever, McGraw-Hill (New York, NY, 1978; ISBN 0-07-055087-5).
- Bruce Spizer, The Beatles Solo on Apple Records, 498 Productions (New Orleans, LA, 2005; ISBN 0-9662649-5-9).
- Gary Tillery, Working Class Mystic: A Spiritual Biography of George Harrison, Quest Books (Wheaton, IL, 2011; ISBN 978-0-8356-0900-5).
- Bob Woffinden, The Beatles Apart, Proteus (London, 1981; ISBN 0-906071-89-5).
