= Thirty Three & 1/3 =

Studio album by George Harrison
- Released: 19 November 1976
- Recorded: 24 May–13 September 1976
- Studio: FPSHOT (Oxfordshire)
- Genre: Pop rock
- Length: 39:15
- Label: Dark Horse
- Producers: George Harrison; Tom Scott

George Harrison chronology
The Best of George Harrison (1976)	Thirty Three & 1/3 (1976)	George Harrison (1979)

Singles from Thirty Three & 1/3
- 1. "This Song" Released: 15 November 1976; 2. "Crackerbox Palace" Released: 24 January 1977 (US); 3. "True Love" Released: 18 February 1977 (UK); 4. "It's What You Value" Released: 31 May 1977 (UK)

Thirty Three & 1/3 (stylised as Thirty Three & 1/ॐ on the album cover) is the seventh studio album by the English musician George Harrison, released in November 1976. It was Harrison's first album release on his Dark Horse record label, the worldwide distribution for which changed from A&M Records to Warner Bros. as a result of his late delivery of the album's master tapes. Among other misfortunes affecting its creation, Harrison suffered hepatitis midway through recording, and the copyright infringement suit regarding his 1970–71 hit song "My Sweet Lord" was decided in favour of the plaintiff, Bright Tunes Music. The album contains the US top 30 singles "This Song" – Harrison's satire on that lawsuit and the notion of plagiarism in pop music – and "Crackerbox Palace". Despite the problems associated with the album, many music critics recognised Thirty Three & 1/3 as a return to form for Harrison after his tepidly received work during 1974–75, and considered it his strongest collection of songs since 1970's acclaimed All Things Must Pass.

Harrison recorded Thirty Three & 1/3 at his Friar Park home studio, with production assistance from Tom Scott. Other musicians on the recording include Billy Preston, Gary Wright, Willie Weeks, David Foster and Alvin Taylor. Harrison undertook extensive promotion for the album, which included producing comedy-themed video clips for three of the songs, two of which were directed by Monty Python member Eric Idle, and making a number of radio and television appearances. Among the latter was a live performance with singer-songwriter Paul Simon on NBC's Saturday Night Live. The album was remastered in 2004 as part of the Dark Horse Years 1976–1992 reissues following Harrison's death in 2001.

== Background ==
In January 1976, four months after the release of his final album under the Beatles' recording contract with EMI, Extra Texture (Read All About It), George Harrison announced his intention to record for his own record label, Dark Horse Records. Harrison had formed the label in May 1974, when he signed a five-year distribution agreement with A&M Records. In addition to other Dark Horse artists, the contract called for four solo albums from Harrison, the first of which was due by 26 July 1976.

After making the announcement at the annual Midem music fair in Cannes, Harrison spent the early part of 1976 involved in activities other than music-making. Foremost among these was the court case, in New York, for a long-running plagiarism suit launched against him by music publisher Bright Tunes, who contended that Harrison had infringed on their copyright of the Chiffons' song "He's So Fine" in his 1970–71 hit single "My Sweet Lord". While in Los Angeles in February and March, Harrison worked on a proposed documentary film of his 1974 North American tour with Ravi Shankar. On 20 April, he made a guest appearance on stage in New York with the Monty Python comedy troupe, dressed as a Canadian Mountie, as part of the chorus on "The Lumberjack Song". Michael Palin of the Pythons later recalled that Harrison looked "tired and ill"; author Peter Doggett attributes Harrison's poor health to a lifestyle increasingly reliant on alcohol and cocaine, following the failure of his marriage to Pattie Boyd in 1974.

After beginning sessions for the album in late May, Harrison was struck down with hepatitis and unable to work for much of the summer. He first tried a chanting technique as a cure, as proposed in Paramhansa Yogananda's book Scientific Healing Affirmations, before agreeing to his partner Olivia Arias's requests that he seek conventional medical treatment, which was similarly unsuccessful. Arias then researched natural remedies such as acupuncture. Harrison's health was soon restored through a series of treatments in California with acupuncturist Zion Yu. Harrison later said: "I needed the hepatitis to quit drinking." The title for the new album, Thirty Three & 1/3, reflected his age at the time of recording, as well as the speed at which a vinyl LP plays on a turntable.

== Songs ==
Harrison prepared the material he would record for Thirty Three & 1/3 while holidaying in the Virgin Islands in the Caribbean Sea. In musicologist Thomas MacFarlane's view, despite the pressure Harrison was under, the songs he completed demonstrated his sense of humour. Arias recalled that they were joined in the Virgin Islands by Eric Idle of Monty Python, and that the noise they created attracted complaints from television producer Norman Lear and his wife, activist and journalist Frances Lear, who were staying in the neighbouring house. (Note: According to Arias, once the Lears learned that it was George Harrison who was responsible for the loud music, Norman Lear "again knocked on our door, this time apologising and pleading for George to play as much music as he liked".) In their respective studies of the spiritual aspects of Harrison's career, Dale Allison and Gary Tillery view the album as the artist reaffirming his Hindu-aligned spirituality after the despondency evident on Extra Texture. In author Ian Inglis' description, Thirty Three & 1/3 suggests "a man reborn", as confidence, optimism and success have superseded the previous album's themes of pessimism, suspicion and failure.

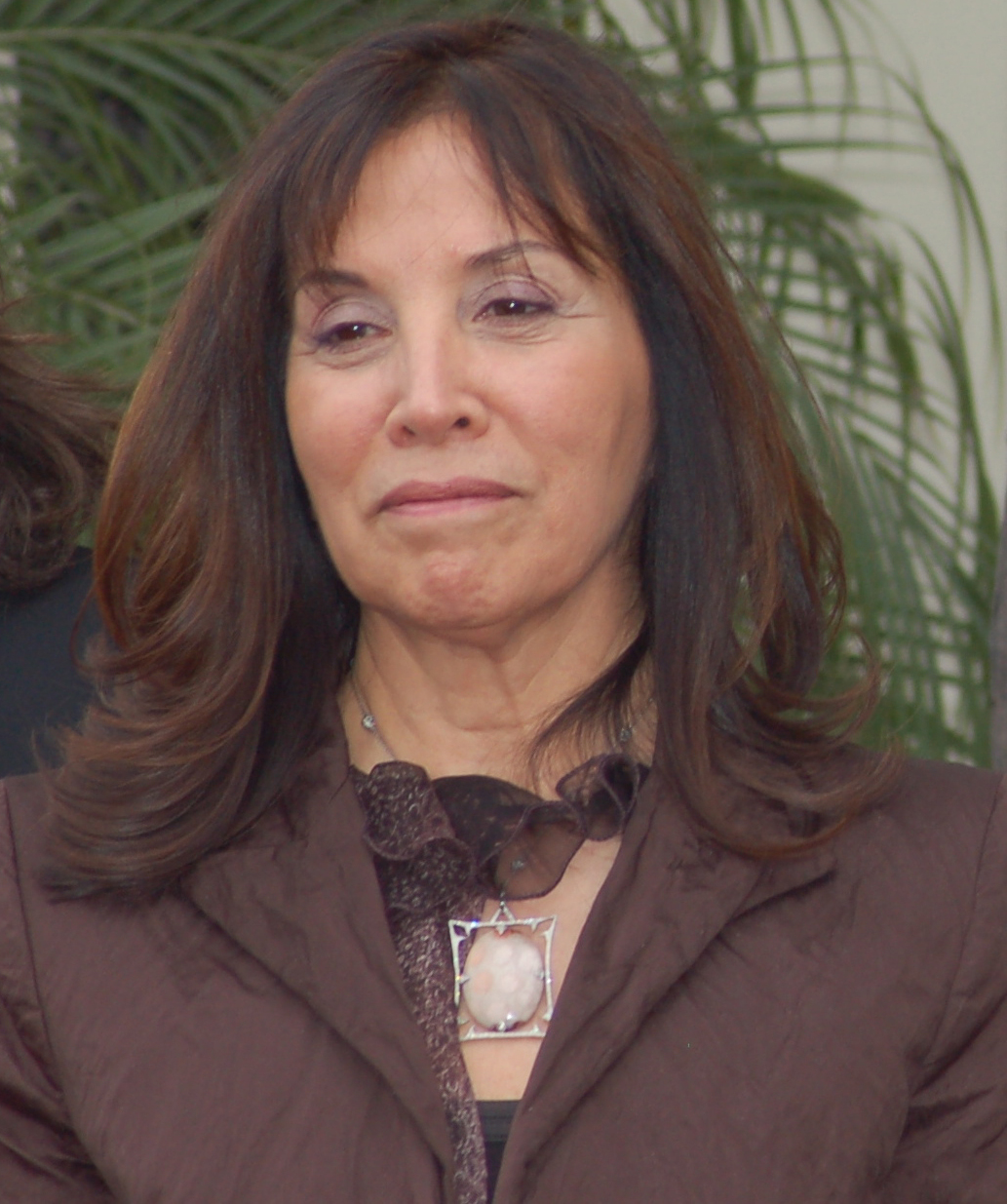
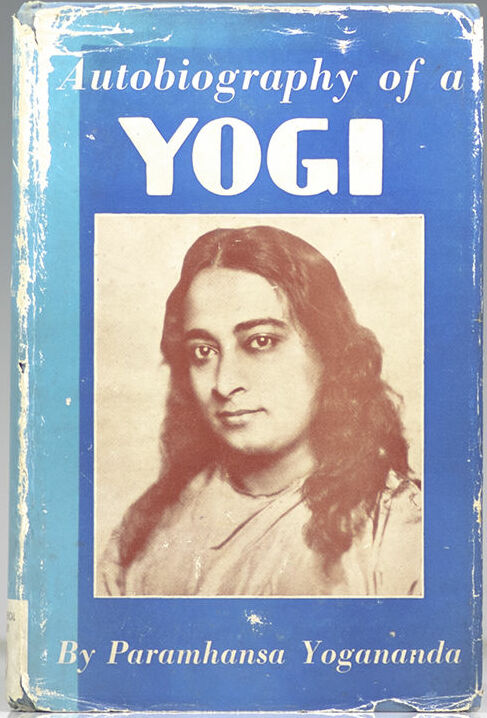
Olivia Harrison (née Arias, pictured in 2009) and Autobiography of a Yogi by Paramhansa Yogananda both inspired songs on Thirty Three & 1/3.

"Crackerbox Palace" was inspired by Harrison meeting the former manager of comedian Lord Buckley at Midem in January 1976. Written in March, "This Song" was Harrison's sardonic send-up of the "My Sweet Lord"/"He's So Fine" court case and reflected his experience in the courtroom as musicologists for both sides argued their respective cases. Harrison said he wrote it to "exorcise the paranoia about songwriting" that the episode had fostered in him. "Pure Smokey" was his musical tribute to soul singer Smokey Robinson. "It's What You Value" came about after drummer Jim Keltner had declined payment for appearing in Harrison's 1974 tour band, instead requesting a new Mercedes sportscar. The lyrics reflect the singer's interest in Formula 1, with a reference to the six-wheel Tyrrell P34. As a rare cover version, Harrison reworked the Cole Porter standard "True Love" in the pop style. He later joked that Bing Crosby's well-known version from 1956 "got the chords wrong" and was "a bit slow".

Harrison completed "See Yourself", which he had started writing in 1967 following Paul McCartney's public admission that he had taken the drug LSD. "Woman Don't You Cry for Me" and "Beautiful Girl" were other compositions dating from the late 1960s that Harrison revisited for Thirty Three & 1/3. The first of these was a tune he wrote while on tour with Delaney & Bonnie in December 1969, to showcase his then-recent adoption of slide guitar. In completing the lyrics to "Beautiful Girl", it became a love song to Arias, whom he credits with providing the love he "needed for this soul to survive". Like "See Yourself", "Dear One" was inspired by Swami Yogananda, author of Autobiography of a Yogi and a profound influence on Harrison since his visit to India in September 1966. The ballad "Learning How to Love You" was another song inspired by his relationship with Arias. Harrison originally intended it as a track for singer and trumpeter Herb Alpert, the co-founder of A&M Records.

Allison views "Dear One" as the song that reflects Harrison's renewed faith after his self-styled "naughty period", but with a lyrical ambiguity that equally makes it a call for love. When commenting on how the album's love songs appear to be directed to both a deity and a woman, Harrison said he was conscious of this trait, and "all love is part of a universal love. When you love a woman, it's the God in her that you see."

== Recording ==
=== Main sessions ===
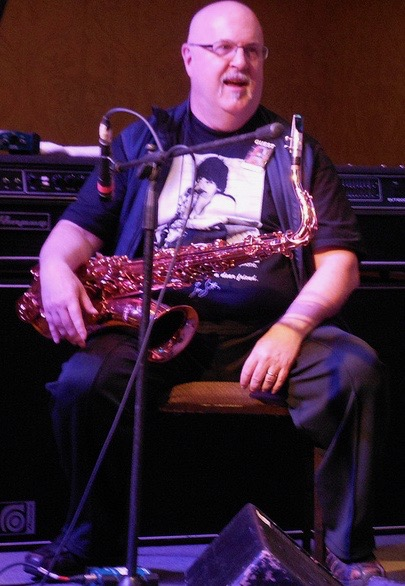
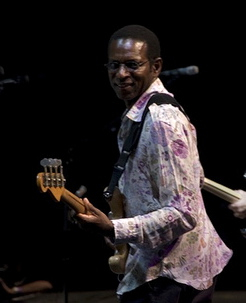
Tom Scott (left, pictured in 2013) and Willie Weeks were among the musicians who played on the album.

Harrison started recording Thirty Three & 1/3 on 24 May 1976, at his Friar Park home studio, FPSHOT, in Oxfordshire. He had taped the basic tracks for twelve songs before the onset of his bout of hepatitis. Having admitted in a recent interview with Melody Maker that he would prefer to work with a co-producer in future, Harrison enlisted jazz saxophonist and arranger Tom Scott. Scott's schedule as musical director of the Starsky & Hutch TV series restricted his role to production assistance on the Harrison album. (Note: Time constraints similarly prevented Harrison from participating in the sessions for Ringo Starr's 1976 album Ringo's Rotogravure. Having collaborated individually with John Lennon and Paul McCartney on the album, Starr chose to record "I'll Still Love You", an unused Harrison composition from the All Things Must Pass era, for Rotogravure.)

As part of an all-North American line-up of musicians at the sessions, other participants included bassist Willie Weeks, drummer Alvin Taylor, keyboard players Richard Tee and David Foster, and jazz percussionist Emil Richards. Harrison's regular associates Gary Wright and Billy Preston also contributed, on keyboards, the latter in between his commitments to the Rolling Stones' concurrent European tour. Taylor had recently played on the album 2nd Resurrection, co-produced by Preston for the Chicago soul group the Stairsteps, one of several acts signed to Dark Horse Records since 1974. Together with the Taylor–Weeks rhythm section, Scott's presence on Thirty Three & 1/3 gave the album a more overt American soul sound compared with Harrison's self-produced Extra Texture. Author Michael Frontani describes Taylor and Weeks as one of Harrison's most effective rhythm sections. Taylor recalled that he recorded his drum parts live to tape on the basic tracks, without any overdubs, and the aesthetic during the sessions was one of "human feeling". (Note: In a 2013 interview, Taylor named Harrison "the very best and my most favourite person" of all the artists he had worked with, citing the Thirty Three & 1/3 album.)

=== Overdubbing ===
Harrison selected ten of the original twelve tracks for overdubbing. He later said that "See Yourself" was a song that he came to like more and more as further instruments were added onto the initial recording. Harrison recorded "Dear One" after most of the musicians had departed. Aside from Tee on Hammond organ, he played all the instruments on the track, including synthesizers. According to authors Chip Madinger and Mark Easter, one of the few items of recording Harrison was able to do over the summer months was an overdubbed acoustic guitar solo on "Learning How to Love You". Idle contributed the "ratbag" vocal interjections on "This Song", commenting on the track's similarity to 1960s hits by Fontella Bass and the Four Tops.

After the keyboard-heavy arrangements on Extra Texture, Harrison's lead guitar playing returned to a prominent role in his sound. His signature slide guitar dominates the album opener, "Woman Don't You Cry for Me", and is represented in, variously, the twin, interweaving solos on "Beautiful Girl" and the multitracked riffs and commentary on "True Love" and "Crackerbox Place". Harrison biographer Simon Leng also highlights his Beatlesque arpeggios in the arrangement of "Beautiful Girl" and the comparatively rare non-slide electric solos he plays on "Pure Smokey".

After the enforced lay-off until late in the summer, Harrison completed work on the album on 13 September 1976. Hank Cicalo was the recording engineer for the sessions, assisted by Kumar Shankar, the nephew of Ravi Shankar. Phil McDonald was the mixing engineer. It was the first Harrison album to be recorded entirely at FPSHOT.

== Release ==
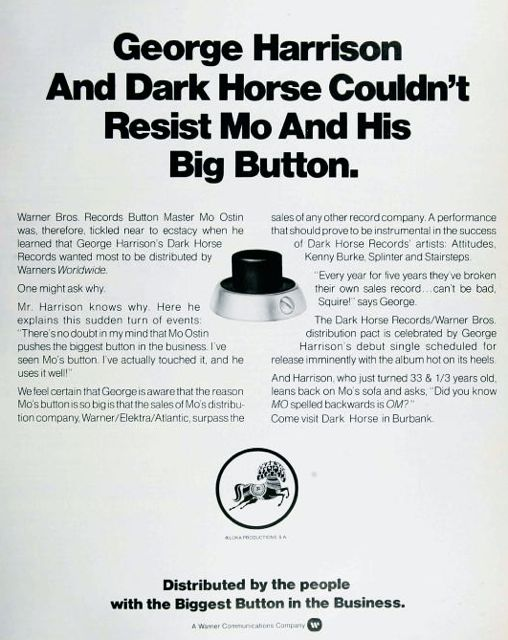
Trade ad announcing Dark Horse's new partnership with Mo Ostin and Warner Bros. Records

By mid 1976, A&M Records were concerned that Dark Horse's roster of artists – which included Shankar, the Stairsteps, Splinter, Jiva, and Keltner and Foster's band Attitudes – had failed to provide a return on the company's investment from the past two years. A&M decided to offload the label and, in an attempt to recoup its costs, the company sued Harrison for $10 million in September 1976, citing his late delivery of Thirty Three & 1/3. That same month, New York judge Richard Owen ruled on the copyright infringement suit, stating that Harrison had "subconsciously plagiarised" part of the melody to the Chiffons song in his 1970 composition. Having settled with A&M by returning his personal advance, Harrison moved Dark Horse over to Mo Ostin-run Warner Bros. Records, where his friend Derek Taylor held an executive position. (Note: Gary Wright had similarly moved from A&M to Warner Bros., where he broke through as a solo artist with his 1975 album The Dream Weaver.)

Warner's announced the worldwide distribution deal with an event held at Chasen's in West Hollywood on 17 November, which Harrison attended. Thirty Three & 1/3 was released on the Dark Horse imprint on 19 November in the UK and 24 November in the US. The album's lead single, "This Song" backed by "Learning How to Love You", was issued on 15 November in the US and four days later in the UK. The LP's gatefold cover was designed by Bob Cato, who also took the photographs for the package. Further to the Hindu imagery on Harrison's previous album covers, the fraction in the title was rendered with the numeral 3 stylised as an Om symbol (ॐ).

Thirty Three & 1/3 outsold Dark Horse and Extra Texture in America, where it peaked at number 11 on its way to being certified gold by the RIAA and selling around 800,000 copies. The album's sales were nevertheless hindered by EMI/Capitol releasing the Best of George Harrison compilation in November 1976. (Note: Due to its inclusion of "My Sweet Lord", the compilation also increased the damages Harrison was required to pay Bright Tunes in Judge Owen's later ruling. Beatles biographer Robert Rodriguez describes the strategic release by EMI/Capitol to "sabotage" Harrison's Dark Horse debut as "a final touch worthy of Allen Klein".) In Britain, the album reached number 35. While the singles "This Song" and "Crackerbox Palace" both became US hits, peaking at number 25 and 19, respectively, on the Billboard Hot 100, none of the three singles issued in the UK – "This Song", "True Love" and "It's What You Value" – placed on the national chart, then a top 50. Music journalist Paul Du Noyer later wrote of the contrasting reception: "Punk rock rendered Harrison obsolete in his homeland but US radio warmed to the expertise and tunefulness of it all."

In 2004, Thirty Three & 1/3 was remastered and reissued, both separately and as part of the deluxe box set The Dark Horse Years 1976–1992, with the addition of a bonus track, "Tears of the World". The latter was an outtake from the 1980 sessions for Harrison's album Somewhere in England. (Note: Following the digital release of much of his catalogue in 2007, an alternative mix of "Learning How to Love You" became available as an iTunes-exclusive download.)

== Promotion ==
I think generally the album's nice because it's happy ... We go through so many crazy things in our lives and I've been up and down and up and down, and the music always reflects it ... This one is just happy and up, that's what I like about it.

— Harrison on Countdown, February 1977

Harrison undertook extensive promotion for Thirty Three & 1/3, the first time he had done so for one of his albums. (Note: According to Madinger and Easter, the level of promotion was not just unprecedented for Harrison but also his most intensive apart from the 1987–88 campaign for Cloud Nine.) Trade advertisements for the release included a copy of his birth certificate under the tagline "1943 Was a Great Year for Music". Harrison taped an interview with the editor of Radio & Records magazine, which Dark Horse issued to radio stations as A Personal Music Dialogue with George Harrison at 33 1/3.

Other promotional activities included print and television interviews across selected cities in the United States during November 1976. He also recorded TV interviews in the UK for Granada Reports and The Old Grey Whistle Test. During the first of these, in Manchester, Harrison agreed to a photo opportunity with former British prime minister Edward Heath; while in Washington, DC, he visited US Secretary of State Henry Kissinger and gave him a Dark Horse Records T-shirt and a copy of Yogananda's Autobiography of a Yogi. Reporting for Rolling Stone, Charles Young described the Harrison–Kissinger meeting as a moment of "absurdist humor" and likened it to the "wonderful cultural clash" in the Beatles' 1964 film A Hard Day's Night when Harrison encounters an earnest marketing executive. (Note: Mitch Glazer, who covered Harrison's 1976 stopovers in Los Angeles, Boston and New York for Crawdaddy, later described the assignment as "one of the joys of my professional life". David Fricke recalled attending a promotional event in Washington and being disarmed by Harrison's openness: "It was a remarkable moment ... and it changed the way I listened to his music, especially that record. I had spoken to the man, not the History ...") After holidaying in India with Arias and Wright, where they attended the wedding of Shankar's niece, he carried out further promotion in Europe in early February 1977.

Harrison also made promotional films, all in a comical vein, for "This Song", "Crackerbox Palace" and "True Love". Warner's distributed the three clips to selected TV stations internationally, where they were aired in conjunction with his personal appearances. "This Song" was directed by Harrison and satirised the New York court proceedings he attended in February. Shot at a Los Angeles courthouse, it included guest appearances by his musician friends Jim Keltner and Ron Wood. Eric Idle directed the clips for "Crackerbox Palace" and "True Love", both of which were filmed at Friar Park. (Note: The promotional films for "This Song" and "Crackerbox Palace" appear on the DVD included in the 2004 Dark Horse Years box set.)

=== Saturday Night Live appearance ===
Harrison performing on Saturday Night Live, November 1976

The clips for "This Song" and "Crackerbox Palace" first aired in the US on 20 November as part of Harrison's appearance on Saturday Night Live. In the same episode, he and Paul Simon performed "Here Comes the Sun" and "Homeward Bound" before a studio audience. (Note: Their performance of "Homeward Bound" was later released on the 1990 charity album Nobody's Child: Romanian Angel Appeal, which Harrison compiled to raise funds for Arias's aid project for Romanian orphans. The song subsequently appeared on the DVD accompanying Simon's 2007 compilation The Essential Paul Simon.) The ratings for the episode were the highest yet achieved by SNL, whose producer, Lorne Michaels, had recently made a regular theme out of spoofing the increasingly lucrative offers for a Beatles reunion. In the show's cold open, Harrison joined in the satire by haggling with Michaels for the full $3000 appearance fee he had offered for the four former Beatles to perform on SNL. Doggett comments on the effectiveness of Harrison's deadpan humour in this scene and his willingness to play "the comic Beatle", saying that ego would have prevented John Lennon from satirising himself on TV, and McCartney's propensity for hamming would have "ruined the sketch".

For Beatles fans, according to biographer Robert Rodriguez, the Harrison–Simon duets created a deep emotional response akin to when Lennon appeared on stage at Madison Square Garden with Elton John in November 1974. As throughout his promotion for the album, Rodriguez continues, Harrison's calm demeanour and physical appearance on the show – looking healthy and devoid of his usual facial hair – regained for him a position of public affection that had waned as a result of his 1974 US tour. (Note: Discussing his recovery from hepatitis on the Personal Music Dialogue disc, Harrison said he now felt "sensational", and better than he had at any time in the past two-and-a-half years. In Rolling Stone, Young wrote, "Harrison almost literally glows with good health.") Author Alan Clayson similarly highlights Harrison's new healthy, clean-shaven image and easy engagement as part of a winning strategy for his Dark Horse Records debut. (Note: In Clayson's description, Harrison now resembled Dave Davies of the Kinks, with "his shoulder-length hair ... kinked and centre-parted, too, and his teeth freshly capped ... the boy meant business". Rodriguez comments that Harrison's look lasted for much of America's bicentenial year, but he was "newly moustachioed and permed" for his European media appearances.)

Saturday Night Live was Harrison's only musical performance while promoting Thirty Three & 1/3, apart from a mimed performance of "This Song" for German TV, on 5 February. Early in the campaign, he discussed the possibility of a world concert tour, to begin in the summer of 1977. By the time of his European promotional engagements, he had gone off the idea. He then took a sabbatical from the music industry for the remainder of the year, during which he and Arias travelled with the 1977 Formula 1 World Championship. (Note: As a rare artistic project during that time, Harrison assisted Idle in developing his Beatles satire the Rutles, a clip of which Idle had shown on SNL in October 1976, into the TV film All You Need Is Cash. Produced by Michaels, the film included cameo appearances by Harrison, Simon, Wood and Mick Jagger.)

== Critical reception ==
=== Contemporary reviews ===
After the disappointments of Dark Horse and Extra Texture over 1974–75, Thirty Three & 1/3 was widely viewed as a return to form for Harrison. It earned the artist his strongest reviews since All Things Must Pass and many critics compared it favourably with the triple album. Billboard magazine described the LP as "a sunny, upbeat album of love songs and cheerful jokes that is his happiest and most commercial package, with least high-flown postures, for perhaps his entire solo career". The reviewer rated the production "top-notch" before concluding: "And Harrison's often-spectacular melody writing gift gets brilliant display here."

In Melody Maker, Ray Coleman remarked on Warner Bros.' need to re-establish Harrison, adding: "The question is merely whether the music [on Thirty Three & 1/3] merits it. Unequivocally, the answer is yes." Coleman praised Harrison's vocals on this "fine album" and likened the quality of his melodies to that on the Beatles' 1965 album Rubber Soul. Michael Gross wrote in Swank magazine that Harrison "seems with 33⅓ to have come unstuck", adding: "If the new record company, new girlfriend ... Olivia Arias, and new disc have put him in a more secure place in the material world, he could well recapture his spot as the Beatle to watch." In a review that Michael Frontani terms "particularly laudatory", Richard Meltzer of The Village Voice described Harrison's new work as "his best LP since All Things Must Pass and on par with, say, [Bob Dylan's] Blood on the Tracks". Fellow Village Voice critic Robert Christgau gave the record a B-minus and said, "This isn't as worldly as George wants you to think – or as he thinks himself, for all I know – but it ain't fulla shit either." He highlighted "This Song" and the album's second side, particularly "Crackerbox Palace", which he regarded among Harrison's best songs since his Beatles days.

Less impressed, Rolling Stone continued to regard Harrison in an unfavourable light after what Elliot Huntley terms its "volte-face" in 1974. The magazine's reviewer, Ken Tucker, noted the accessibility of "fast, cheerful numbers" such as "Woman Don't You Cry for Me" and "This Song" but lamented both "George's persistent preaching" elsewhere and that Scott's presence rendered the album as "music with the feeling and sincerity of cellophane". In the NME, Bob Woffinden admired Harrison's guitar playing but dismissed him as a lyric writer, before concluding: "Harrison's general demeanour is more encouraging ... While it is an album of no particular merit in itself, it is one which leads me to believe that his best work may not necessarily be behind him." (Note: Four years later, Woffinden offered a more positive assessment, writing that "His spiritual convictions no longer seemed to be cramping his style, but affording him a generous and open heart. An excellent production and frequently inspired guitar work were amongst the other positive qualities which the album could boast.")

Writing in 1977, Nicholas Schaffner found that, in comparison with All Things Must Pass, the songs on Thirty Three & 1/3 "rely on pure melody and George's own musicianship instead of dazzling orchestrations and production". Schaffner added: "The tastefulness of his performance on his two pet instruments, slide guitar and synthesizer, is unmatched in rock, and Thirty-three and a Third boasts the most varied and tuneful collection of Harrison melodies to date." In the 1978 edition of The Beatles: An Illustrated Record, NME critics Roy Carr and Tony Tyler described Thirty Three & 1/3 as Harrison's "best effort – by far" since All Things Must Pass. Carr and Tyler concluded: "It must be the production. For no individual track really presents itself as typifying a New Harrison Approach – and yet the impression left by the album as a whole is definitely of a more balanced, poised and devil-may-care Hari ..."

=== Retrospective reviews and legacy ===
Professional ratings
Review scores
Source	Rating
AllMusic	3.5/5 stars
All-Music Guide to Rock	5/5 stars
Blender	4/5 stars
Christgau's Record Guide	B−
Encyclopedia of Popular Music	3/5 stars
Mojo	3/5 stars
Music Story	3.5/5 stars
The Rolling Stone Album Guide	3.5/5 stars
Uncut	7/10

In a review for Rolling Stone following Harrison's death in November 2001, Greg Kot said of Thirty Three & 1/3: "'Crackerbox Palace' has a twinkle in its eye, the kind of song that had previously eluded the increasingly self-serious Harrison ... The tune's melodic sweep is nearly matched by 'This Song' ... The two tracks form the center of the guitarist's strongest collection since his solo debut." Having interviewed Harrison for Guitar World magazine in 1987, Rip Rense praised the solos on tracks such as "Learning How to Love You" and "Beautiful Girl", while opining of Harrison's "underrated solo [career]": "his work is my choice for best among the ex-Fabs for being the most substantial in melody, structure, and content. Thirty-Three and a Third, for instance, might yet be hailed as a minor masterpiece ..."

In the 2004 Rolling Stone Album Guide, Mac Randall named "Beautiful Girl" as "one of the many highlights of his upbeat return to pop form, Thirty-Three & 1/3". Writing for The Word that year, Paul Du Noyer referred to the album as "the lost treasure" among Harrison's Dark Horse Years reissues, and in a concurrent review for Blender, he highlighted "Crackerbox Palace" and "Learning How to Love You" as the standout tracks.

With some albums, the backstory is more fascinating than the music, but in this case the songs and performances are inseparable from the swirling circumstances enmeshed in their creation – romance, redemption, acrimony, epiphany. Thirty Three & 1/3 stands as a pivotal album in Harrison's body of work, the document of a man in the act of discovering exactly where he belonged.

— Bud Scoppa, Uncut, 2018

In another 2004 appraisal, for PopMatters, Jason Korenkiewicz wrote that the remaster "allows the guitars to ring, and the percussion has a crispness that was hidden in past releases". Korenkiewicz included "the magnificent 'Dear One'" among the album's "countless classic tracks" and considered that Thirty Three & 1/3 "features more consistent high points than any Harrison album since All Things Must Pass". Conversely, Kit Aiken of Uncut described it as an "oddly ordinary album" that reflected the "blow to his confidence and inspiration" as a result of the court's ruling on "My Sweet Lord". Writing for the same magazine in July 2012, David Quantick included Thirty Three & 1/3 among Harrison's best solo releases, along with All Things Must Pass and Cloud Nine.

Robert Rodriguez has written of A&M's folly in parting with Dark Horse Records and thereby missing out on a work that would stand as "possibly [Harrison's] most commercial ever". Rodriguez adds: "If ever an album cried out for a tour, it was this lively, energetic, and colorfully upbeat collection." Former Mojo editor Mat Snow views it as a "confident, if not quite classic" album on which Harrison "had his groove back". In his review of Harrison's 2014 Apple/EMI reissues, Alex Franquelli of PopMatters cites Thirty Three & 1/3 as an example of how "Harrison's artistic output remained coherent with itself" following All Things Must Pass, and he describes the album as "well above the average pop songwriting".

== Track listing ==
All songs written by George Harrison, except where noted.

Side one

1. "Woman Don't You Cry for Me" – 3:18
2. "Dear One" – 5:08
3. "Beautiful Girl" – 3:39
4. "This Song" – 4:13
5. "See Yourself" – 2:51

Side two

1. "It's What You Value" – 5:07
2. "True Love" (Cole Porter) – 2:45
3. "Pure Smokey" – 3:56
4. "Crackerbox Palace" – 3:57
5. "Learning How to Love You" – 4:13

Bonus tracks

For the 2004 digitally remastered issue of Thirty Three & 1/3, a bonus track was added:

11. "Tears of the World" – 4:04

iTunes bonus track:

12. "Learning How to Love You" (early mix) – 4:13

== Personnel ==
According to the album credits, except where noted:

- George Harrison – vocals, electric and acoustic guitars, synthesizers, percussion, backing vocals
- Tom Scott – saxophones, flute, lyricon
- Richard Tee – piano, organ, Fender Rhodes
- Willie Weeks – bass guitar
- Alvin Taylor – drums
- Billy Preston – piano, organ, synthesizer (on "Beautiful Girl", "This Song" and "See Yourself")
- David Foster – Fender Rhodes, clavinet
- Gary Wright – keyboards
- Emil Richards – marimba
- Eric Idle – voices on "This Song"

== Charts ==
=== Weekly charts ===
Chart (1976–77)	Peak position
Australian Kent Music Report	27
Canadian RPM Top Albums	10
Japanese Oricon LP Chart	23
Norwegian VG-lista Albums	17
Swiss Albums Chart	19
UK Albums Chart	35
US Billboard Top LPs & Tape	11
US Cash Box Top 100 Albums	15

=== Year-end charts ===
Chart (1977)	Position
Canadian RPM Year-End	64
US Billboard Year-End	95

== Certifications ==
Region	Certification	Certified units/sales
United States (RIAA)	Gold	500,000^{^}
United Kingdom (BPI)	Silver	60,000^{^}
^{^} Shipments figures based on certification alone.

== Sources ==
- Allison, Dale C., Jr. (2006). The Love There That's Sleeping: The Art and Spirituality of George Harrison. New York, NY: Continuum. ISBN 978-0-8264-1917-0.
- Badman, Keith (2001). The Beatles Diary Volume 2: After the Break-Up 1970–2001. London: Omnibus Press. ISBN 0-7119-8307-0.
- Bogdanov, Vladimir; Woodstra, Chris; Erlewine, Stephen Thomas, eds. (2001). All Music Guide: The Definitive Guide to Popular Music (4th ed.). San Francisco, CA: Backbeat Books. ISBN 0-87930-627-0.
- Brackett, Nathan; Hoard, Christian, eds. (2004). The New Rolling Stone Album Guide (4th ed.). New York, NY: Fireside/Simon & Schuster. ISBN 0-7432-0169-8.
- Carr, Roy; Tyler, Tony (1978). The Beatles: An Illustrated Record. London: Trewin Copplestone Publishing. ISBN 0-450-04170-0.
- Christgau, Robert (1981). Christgau's Record Guide: Rock Albums of the Seventies. Boston, MA: Ticknor & Fields. ISBN 0-89919-025-1.
- Clayson, Alan (2003). George Harrison. London: Sanctuary. ISBN 1-86074-489-3.
- Doggett, Peter (2011). You Never Give Me Your Money: The Beatles After the Breakup. New York, NY: It Books. ISBN 978-0-06-177418-8.
- The Editors of Rolling Stone (2002). Harrison. New York, NY: Rolling Stone Press/Simon & Schuster. ISBN 0-7432-3581-9.
- Frontani, Michael (2009). "The Solo Years". In Kenneth Womack (ed.). The Cambridge Companion to the Beatles. Cambridge, UK: Cambridge University Press. ISBN 978-1-139-82806-2., pp. 153–82.
- Giuliano, Geoffrey (1997). Dark Horse: The Life and Art of George Harrison. Cambridge, MA: Da Capo Press. ISBN 0-306-80747-5.
- Harrison, George (2002). I Me Mine. San Francisco, CA: Chronicle Books. ISBN 0-8118-3793-9.
- Harry, Bill (2003). The George Harrison Encyclopedia. London: Virgin Books. ISBN 978-0-7535-0822-0.
- Hunt, Chris, ed. (2005). NME Originals: Beatles – The Solo Years 1970–1980. London: IPC Ignite!.
- Huntley, Elliot J. (2006). Mystical One: George Harrison – After the Break-up of the Beatles. Toronto, ON: Guernica Editions. ISBN 1-55071-197-0.
- Inglis, Ian (2010). The Words and Music of George Harrison. Santa Barbara, CA: Praeger. ISBN 978-0-313-37532-3.
- Kahn, Ashley, ed. (2020). George Harrison on George Harrison: Interviews and Encounters. Chicago, IL: Chicago Review Press. ISBN 978-1-64160-051-4.
- Larkin, Colin (2011). The Encyclopedia of Popular Music (5th ed.). London: Omnibus Press. ISBN 978-0-85712-595-8.
- Leng, Simon (2006). While My Guitar Gently Weeps: The Music of George Harrison. Milwaukee, WI: Hal Leonard. ISBN 1-4234-0609-5.
- MacFarlane, Thomas (2019). The Music of George Harrison. Abingdon, UK: Routledge. ISBN 978-1-138-59910-9.
- Madinger, Chip; Easter, Mark (2000). Eight Arms to Hold You: The Solo Beatles Compendium. Chesterfield, MO: 44.1 Productions. ISBN 0-615-11724-4.
- Rodriguez, Robert (2010). Fab Four FAQ 2.0: The Beatles' Solo Years 1970–1980. Milwaukee, WI: Hal Leonard. ISBN 978-0-87930-968-8.
- Schaffner, Nicholas (1978). The Beatles Forever. New York, NY: McGraw-Hill. ISBN 0-07-055087-5.
- Snow, Mat (November 2014). "George Harrison: Quiet Storm". Mojo. pp. 66–73.
- Tillery, Gary (2011). Working Class Mystic: A Spiritual Biography of George Harrison. Wheaton, IL: Quest Books. ISBN 978-0-8356-0900-5.
- Woffinden, Bob (1981). The Beatles Apart. London: Proteus. ISBN 0-906071-89-5.
