= It's What You Value =

Single by George Harrison

from the album Thirty Three & 1/3
- B-side: "Woman Don't You Cry for Me"
- Released: 17 June 1977
- Recorded: 1976
- Studio: FPSHOT
- Genre: Rock, pop
- Length: 5:07
- Label: Dark Horse
- Songwriter: George Harrison
- Producer: George Harrison with Tom Scott

George Harrison singles chronology
"True Love" (1977)	"It's What You Value" (1977)	"Blow Away" (1979)

"It's What You Value" is a song by English musician George Harrison, released on his 1976 album Thirty Three & 1/3. As a single release in the United Kingdom, in June 1977, it was issued in a generic sleeve.

The lyrics in the song are in reference to Harrison paying drummer Jim Keltner with a Mercedes 450 SL, in lieu of financial payment, for playing on his 1974 Dark Horse Tour.

== Personnel ==
- George Harrison – vocals, electric guitar, cowbell, tambourine, backing vocals
- Tom Scott – saxophones
- Richard Tee – pianos
- Willie Weeks – bass
- Alvin Taylor – drums
- Emil Richards – marimba
