= Dear One =

Song by George Harrison

from the album Thirty Three & 1/3
- Released: 19 November 1976
- Genre: Rock, pop
- Length: 5:08
- Label: Dark Horse
- Songwriter(s): George Harrison
- Producer(s): George Harrison with Tom Scott

"Dear One" is a song by English musician George Harrison, released in 1976 on his album Thirty Three & 1/3. The song was inspired by, and dedicated to, Paramahansa Yogananda, whose 1946 book Autobiography of a Yogi was a great influence on Harrison. Aside from keyboard player Richard Tee, Harrison plays all the instruments on the recording.

== History ==
Harrison wrote the lyrics to "Dear One" in 1976 during a vacation to the Virgin Islands, shortly before starting work on Thirty Three & 1/3. In his autobiography, I, Me, Mine, Harrison says that he believes the song is the only one he ever wrote in open A tuning. The lyrics are directed to Premavatar Paramahansa Yogananda, author of Autobiography of a Yogi, who Harrison called "a great influence on my life". While in India in 1966, Harrison was given a copy of Yogananda's book by Ravi Shankar's brother, after which, author Peter Doggett writes, Harrison "read every Indian spiritual text he could find".

Apart from American musician Richard Tee on organ, Harrison played all the instruments on the recording: acoustic guitars, synthesizers and percussion (hi-hats). As with the song "See Yourself", Harrison dedicated "Dear One" to Yogananda on the credits to the Thirty Three & 1/3 album.

In his Encyclopedia of Popular Music, Colin Larkin describes the track as a song that "could have come straight off of The Beatles' Abbey Road". He adds: "'Dear One' weaves a haunting, Indian-influenced melody with a big pop chorus to create an intensely moving song of devotion."

== Personnel ==
- George Harrison – vocals, acoustic guitars, synthesizers, hi-hat, shaker, backing vocals
- Richard Tee – organ
