= Woman Don't You Cry for Me =

"Woman Don't You Cry For Me"
- 1977 UK single face label

Song by George Harrison

from the album Thirty Three & 1/3
- Released: 19 November 1976
- Genre: Funk rock
- Length: 3:18
- Label: Dark Horse
- Songwriter: George Harrison
- Producer: George Harrison with Tom Scott

"Woman Don't You Cry For Me" is a song by English musician George Harrison, released as the opening track of his 1976 album Thirty Three & 1/3.

== Background ==
Harrison started writing the song in Gothenburg, Sweden, in 1969. Along with his friend, fellow guitarist Eric Clapton, Harrison was on a European tour at the time with Delaney & Bonnie and Friends. Delaney Bramlett handed Harrison a bottleneck slide guitar, which he immediately began to play around with. One of the first results of Harrison's discovery of this instrument was "Woman Don't You Cry For Me". He later said that the title of the song might have been suggested by Bramlett. The song almost went on his 1970 triple album All Things Must Pass, but instead appeared on Thirty Three & 1/3, released in 1976. In May 1977, it appeared as the B-side to the third single from the album in the UK, "It's What You Value".

"Woman Don't You Cry for Me" is one of several bottleneck-inspired Harrison songs from the period − "Sue Me, Sue You Blues", "I Dig Love", "Māya Love" and "Hari's on Tour (Express)" being others. The song is in open E.

== Re-release ==
In November 2011, an early take of "Woman Don't You Cry for Me" was included on the deluxe edition CD for the British DVD release of the Martin Scorsese-directed documentary George Harrison: Living in the Material World. This version is included on Early Takes: Volume 1.

== Personnel ==
- George Harrison – vocals, slide guitars, tambourine, jew's harp
- David Foster – clavinet
- Richard Tee – organ
- Willie Weeks – bass
- Alvin Taylor – drums
- Tom Scott – baritone saxophones
