= Nicholas Schaffner =

American writer (1953–1991)

- Born: January 28, 1953 New York City, U.S.
- Died: August 28, 1991 (aged 38) New York City, U.S.
- Occupation: Author
- Education: The Choate School; New College of Florida
- Genre: Music

Nicholas Schaffner (January 28, 1953 – August 28, 1991) was an American non-fiction author, journalist, and singer-songwriter.

== Biography ==
Schaffner was born in Manhattan to John V. Schaffner (1913–1983), a literary agent whose clients included Ray Bradbury, and his wife Perdita Macpherson Schaffner (1919–2001; the former Frances Perdita Aldington). His maternal grandparents were the Imagist poet H.D., and the composer and music critic Cecil Gray. He had three siblings. He attended the Choate School and the New College of Florida, graduating from both schools.

Schaffner had been collecting Beatles memorabilia through much of the 1960s, which directly led to his first book, The Beatles Forever, published in 1977. With its critical acceptance, he was established as an authority on the Beatles. Among initial reviews of the book, the New York Post described it as "honest, factual and highly entertaining", while Publishers Weekly said: "May well be the book for Beatlemaniacs … All-inclusive, responsible and informative …" Schaffner subsequently appeared as a commentator in a 1982 documentary about the group called The Compleat Beatles.

The Beatles Forever continues to be held in high regard by writers and commentators. In their 2007 overview of Beatles literature, authors Stuart Shea and Robert Rodriguez said that the book succeeds through the narrative's combination of first-hand experience and the writer's ability to relate this to a wider cultural context. Shea and Rodriguez also wrote: "This book, along with Carr and Tyler's Illustrated Record filled a serious void at the time in Beatles history. Schaffner's work is one of the best books about the group ever written, and an entire generation of Beatles fans still swears by it, thanks to Schaffner's excellent prose and organizational skills." While discussing the most recent generation of Beatles biographies in December 2013, Chicago Tribune critic Mark Caro recalled the book's publication and described it as "the superior critical-minded history" on the band. Ian Inglis, author of a 2010 biography on George Harrison, wrote of Schaffner's contribution: "Among the very best of the hundreds of books that examine the history of the Beatles. Intelligently written …"

As an author, his other works include the Pink Floyd biography A Saucerful of Secrets: The Pink Floyd Odyssey as well as the children's book The Boys from Liverpool: John, Paul, George, Ringo. In 1981 he collaborated with his sister, Elizabeth, on 505 Rock-and-Roll Questions Your Friends Can't Answer. This was followed by The British Invasion (1982), a compendium of lengthy historical essays covering the Beatles and many of their contemporary UK groups, as well as shorter essays (mostly written by other writers of Schaffner's acquaintance) on other English music acts through the 1970s. Schaffner also wrote articles for Rolling Stone, Musician, The Village Voice, and Trouser Press.

Schaffner's song cycle, Magical Kingdoms, was self-released in 1990. Music from the collection has been performed posthumously at tribute events at venues including New York's Lincoln Center.

Schaffner died on August 28, 1991, in New York City of an AIDS-related illness shortly after the release of Saucerful of Secrets: The Pink Floyd Odyssey.

== Published works ==
- The Beatles Forever, Hardcover: Cameron House (1977). ISBN 0-8117-0225-1. Paperback: McGraw-Hill Book Company (1978). ISBN 0-07-055087-5
- The Boys from Liverpool: John, Paul, George, Ringo, Routledge Kegan & Paul (1980). ISBN 0-416-30661-6
- 505 Rock-and-Roll Questions Your Friends Can't Answer (with Elizabeth Schaffner), Walker & Co. (1981). ISBN 0-8027-0674-6
- The British Invasion: From the First Wave to the New Wave, McGraw-Hill (1982). ISBN 0-07-055089-1
- John Lennon: In My Life (with Pete Shotton), Stein & Day (1983). ISBN 0-8128-2916-6
- Saucerful of Secrets: The Pink Floyd Odyssey, Harmony Books (1991). ISBN 0-517-57608-2
