= List of songs recorded by George Harrison =

Songs recorded by George Harrison

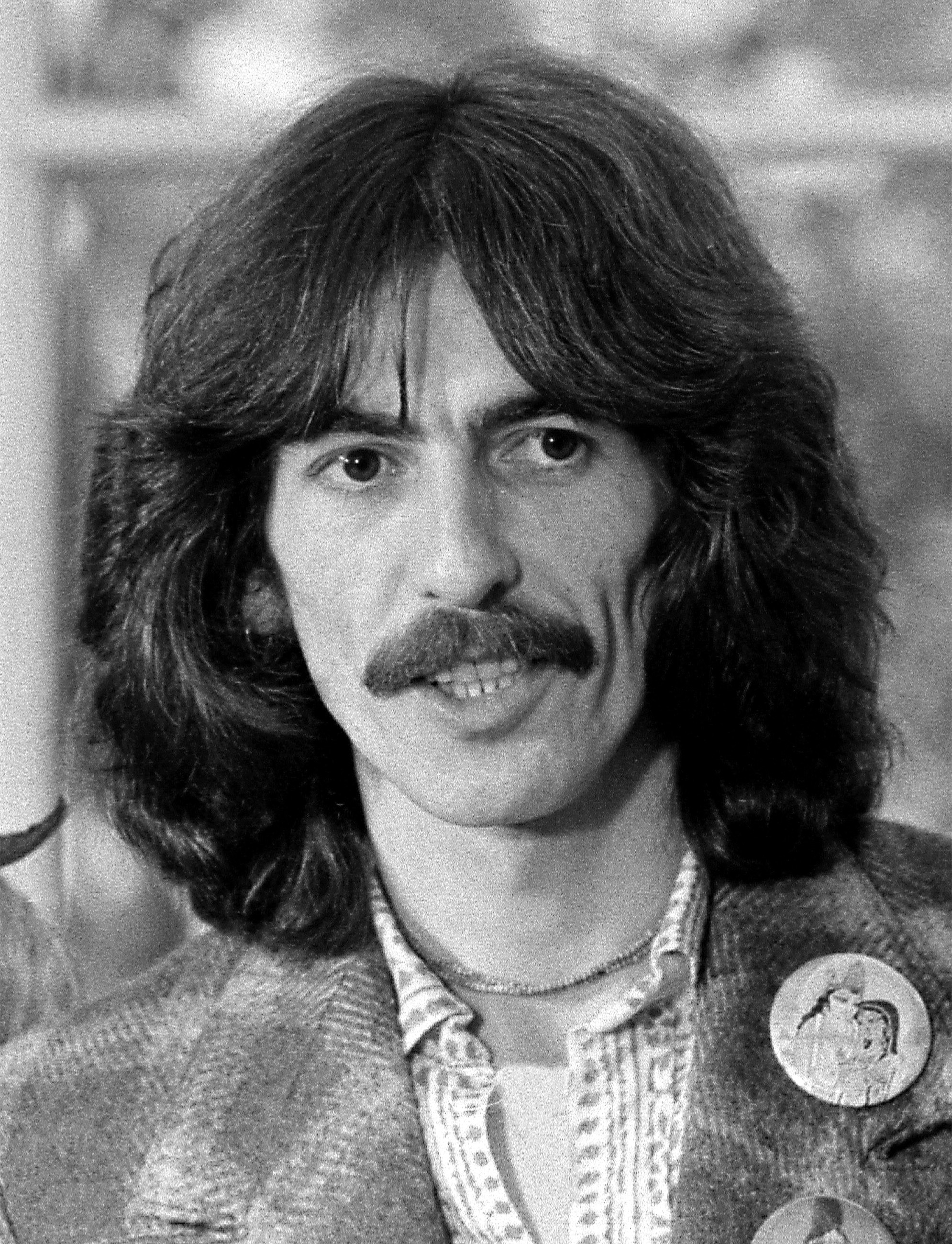
George Harrison in 1974

George Harrison (1943–2001) was an English musician who gained international fame as the lead guitarist of the Beatles. With his songwriting contributions limited by the dominance of John Lennon and Paul McCartney, Harrison was the first member of the Beatles to release a solo album. Wonderwall Music (1968), a mostly instrumental soundtrack album combining Western and Indian sounds, was followed by Electronic Sound (1969), an experimental album containing two lengthy pieces performed on Moog synthesizer. Following the Beatles' break-up in 1970, Harrison released the triple album All Things Must Pass. Co-produced by Phil Spector, it included the hit singles "My Sweet Lord" and "What Is Life". The album featured musical contributions from Eric Clapton and Ringo Starr, both of whom collaborated regularly with Harrison throughout his solo career, and two signature elements of Harrison's work: his slide guitar playing and spiritually themed songwriting.

While organising the Concert for Bangladesh in 1971, Harrison recorded the charity single "Bangla Desh". The Concert for Bangladesh live album included three of Harrison's best-known Beatles songs: "While My Guitar Gently Weeps", "Here Comes the Sun" and "Something". Living in the Material World (1973) featured a pared-down sound and increasingly devout lyrics. It included the single "Give Me Love (Give Me Peace on Earth)" and a title track in which contrasting sections of Indian music and Western rock mirrored Harrison's struggle to attain his spiritual goals. Dark Horse (1974) included songs inspired by the end of his marriage to Pattie Boyd and, particularly in the title track, vocal performances marred by Harrison contracting laryngitis – a result of overexertion as he prepared to launch his Dark Horse record label. Extra Texture (Read All About It) (1975) contained several songs in a downbeat soul style, reflecting his despondency following the mixed reception afforded his 1974 North American tour with Ravi Shankar. Largely recorded in Los Angeles, the album included "This Guitar (Can't Keep from Crying)", a sequel to "While My Guitar Gently Weeps".

Thirty Three & 1/3 (1976) furthered the American soul influence and, with its singles "This Song" and "Crackerbox Palace", was a more buoyant collection than its predecessors. Marked also by a more subtle approach to religious pronouncements, the album typified Harrison's move towards love songs seemingly addressed to his deity as much as to a romantic partner. Co-produced by Russ Titelman, George Harrison (1979) reflected Harrison's contentment after a period spent travelling. It included the hit single "Blow Away", songs celebrating the tranquil surroundings he had discovered on Hawaii, and a tribute to Formula One racing drivers, "Faster". Somewhere in England was released in 1981 and featured "All Those Years Ago", a tribute to Lennon following his murder in December 1980. Gone Troppo (1982) included the single "Wake Up My Love" and "Circles", a song that, like "Not Guilty" from George Harrison, had originally been considered for the Beatles' White Album in 1968.

After a four-year hiatus, Harrison returned with Cloud Nine (1987), co-produced by Jeff Lynne. It included a cover version of Rudy Clark's "Got My Mind Set on You" and the Beatles tribute "When We Was Fab". Harrison then formed the Traveling Wilburys with Lynne, Dylan, Roy Orbison and Tom Petty. He issued the 1989 compilation Best of Dark Horse, which included "Cheer Down", co-written with Petty. Harrison's 1992 album Live in Japan, recorded on tour with Clapton, included renditions of "Taxman", "If I Needed Someone" and several other Harrison compositions from the Beatles' catalogue. Harrison then reunited with Starr and McCartney for the Beatles Anthology multimedia project and collaborated extensively with Shankar, but he issued no further recordings under his own name before his death in November 2001. His final album, Brainwashed (2002), included the singles "Any Road" and "Stuck Inside a Cloud", and the slide-guitar instrumental "Marwa Blues".

== Songs ==
Key
†	Indicates songs not solely written by George Harrison
‡	Indicates instrumental

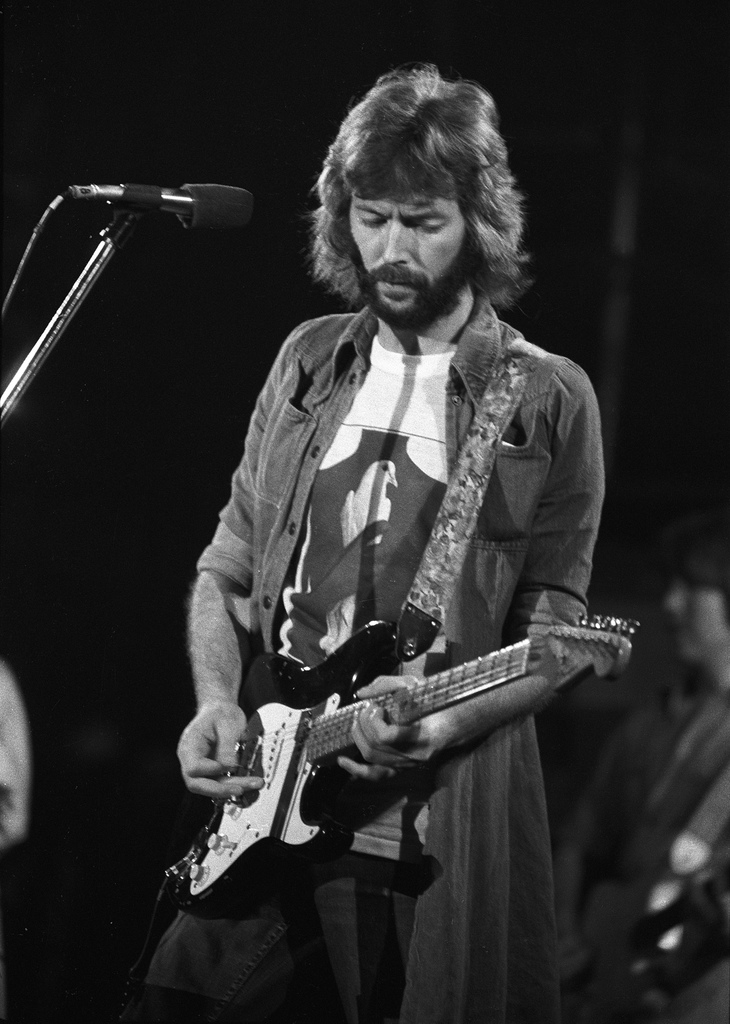
Starting with the Wonderwall Music track "Ski-ing" in 1968, Eric Clapton played guitar on many of Harrison's recordings as a solo artist.

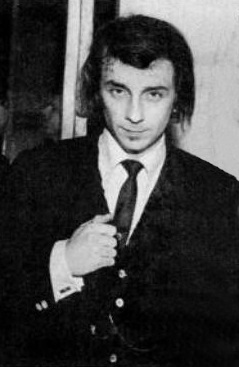
Phil Spector co-produced Harrison's recordings over 1970–72, including the songs "My Sweet Lord", "Isn't It a Pity" and "Bangla Desh". Harrison subsequently adopted elements of Spector's Wall of Sound in his own production style, particularly on "Don't Let Me Wait Too Long" and "Ding Dong, Ding Dong".

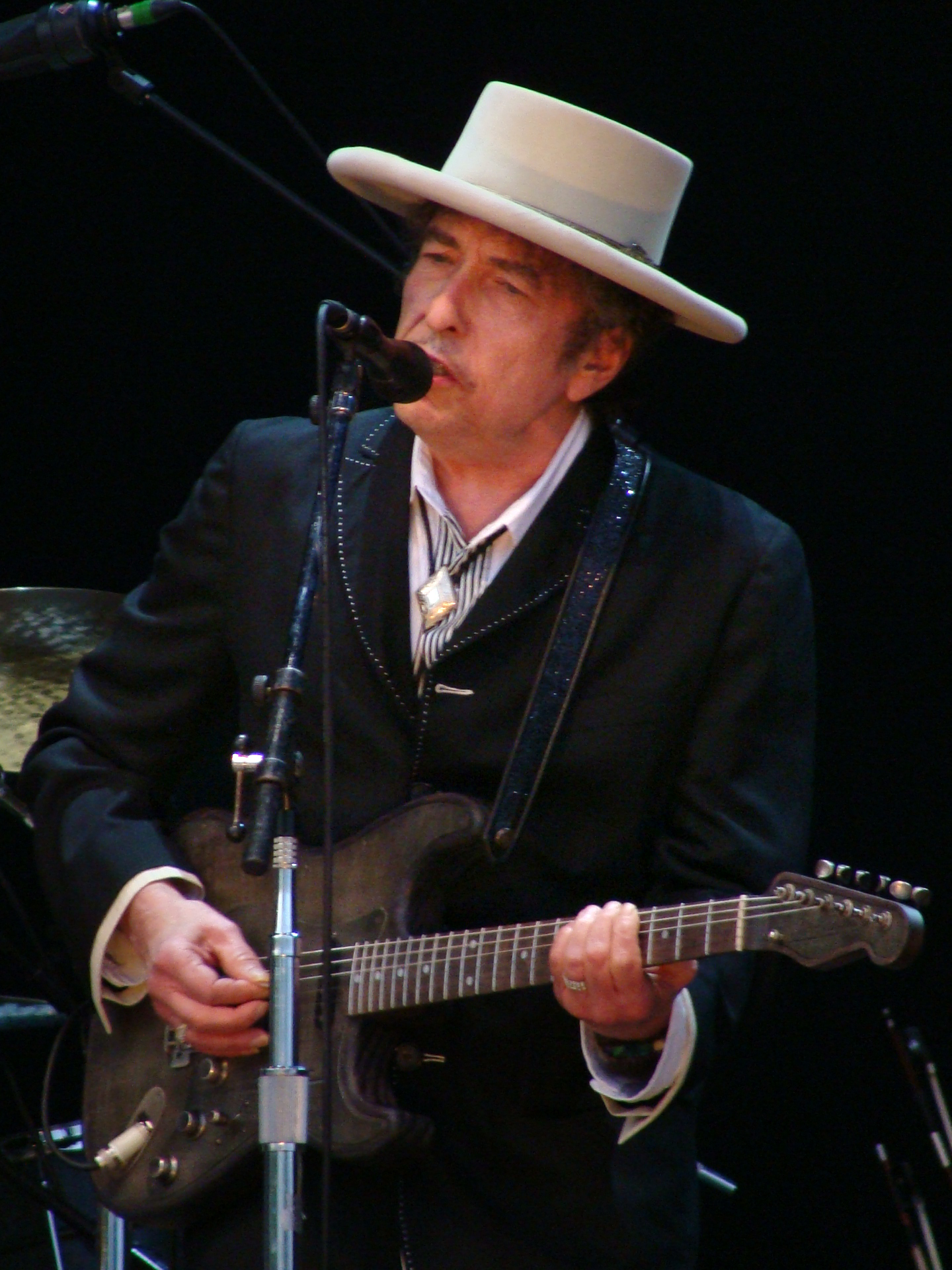
Bob Dylan co-wrote "I'd Have You Anytime" with Harrison and provided the inspiration for another All Things Must Pass track reflecting on their friendship, "Behind That Locked Door". Harrison also recorded cover versions of Dylan songs such as "If Not for You" and "I Don't Want to Do It".

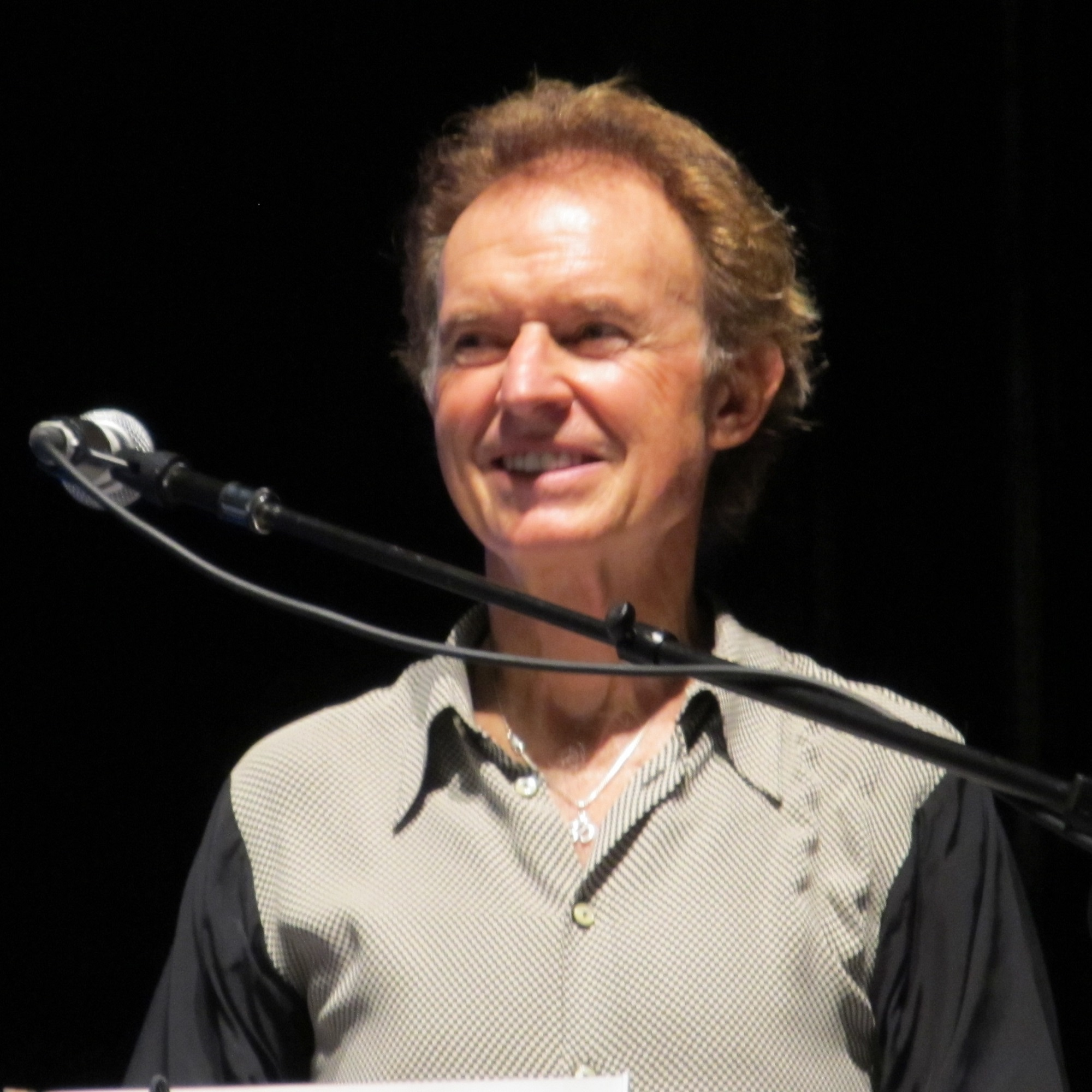
Gary Wright played keyboards on all of Harrison's 1970s albums and on Cloud Nine. A fellow devotee of Hindu teachings, Wright also co-wrote "If You Believe" and "That's What It Takes".

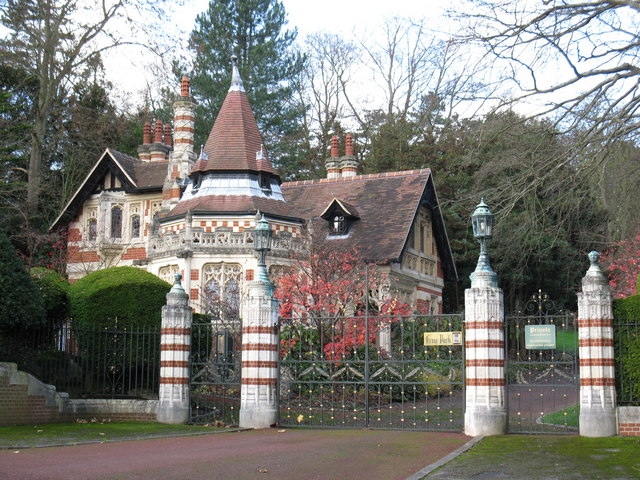
Entrance to Harrison's Friar Park estate in Oxfordshire. From 1973, Harrison recorded the majority of his music at his Friar Park studio, while the property's inscriptions and gardens provided lyrical inspiration for songs such as "Ballad of Sir Frankie Crisp", "Ding Dong", "The Answer's at the End" and "Flying Hour".

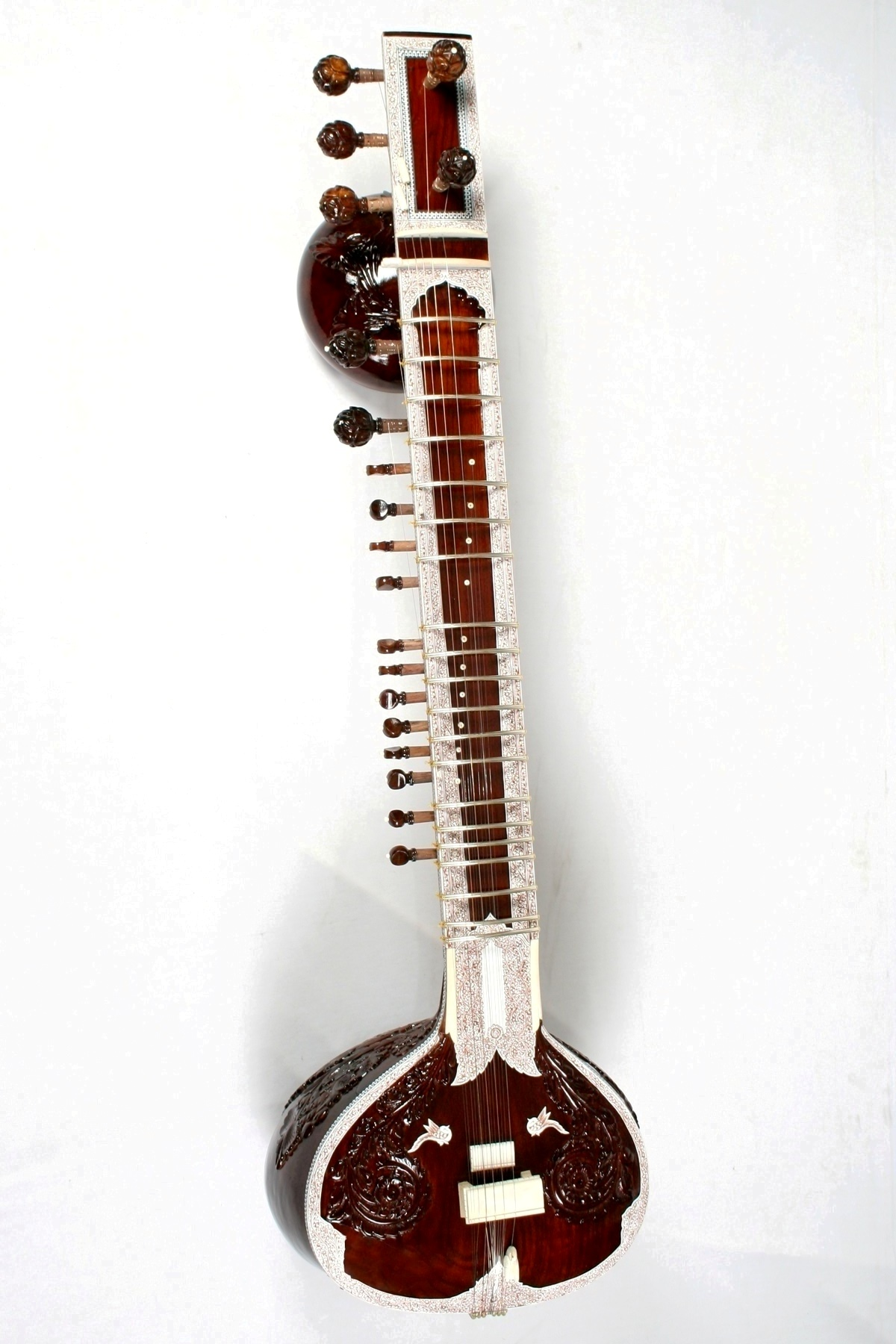
Having popularised the sitar through his work with the Beatles, Harrison made only minimal use of Indian instrumentation in his songs after 1968. Among the rare examples are "Living in the Material World", "Be Here Now", "It Is 'He' (Jai Sri Krishna)", "Writing's on the Wall" and "Ride Rajbun".

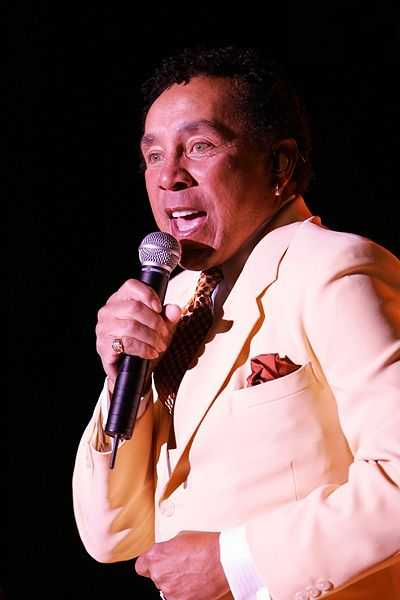
Harrison's enduring admiration of soul music was reflected in two songs he wrote in tribute to Smokey Robinson in the mid-1970s, "Ooh Baby" and "Pure Smokey".

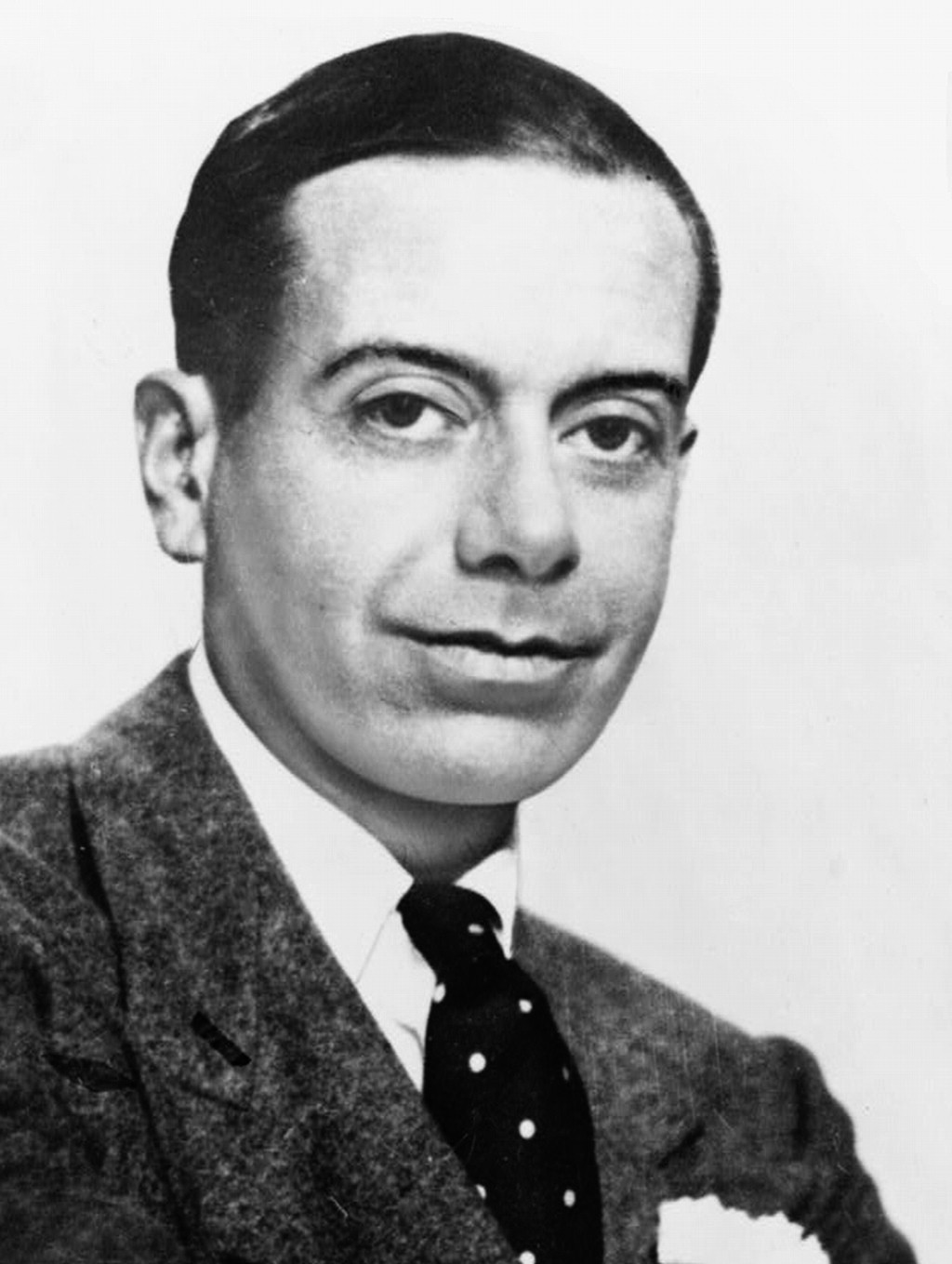
Harrison released a pop version of Cole Porter's "True Love" on his album Thirty Three & 1/3.

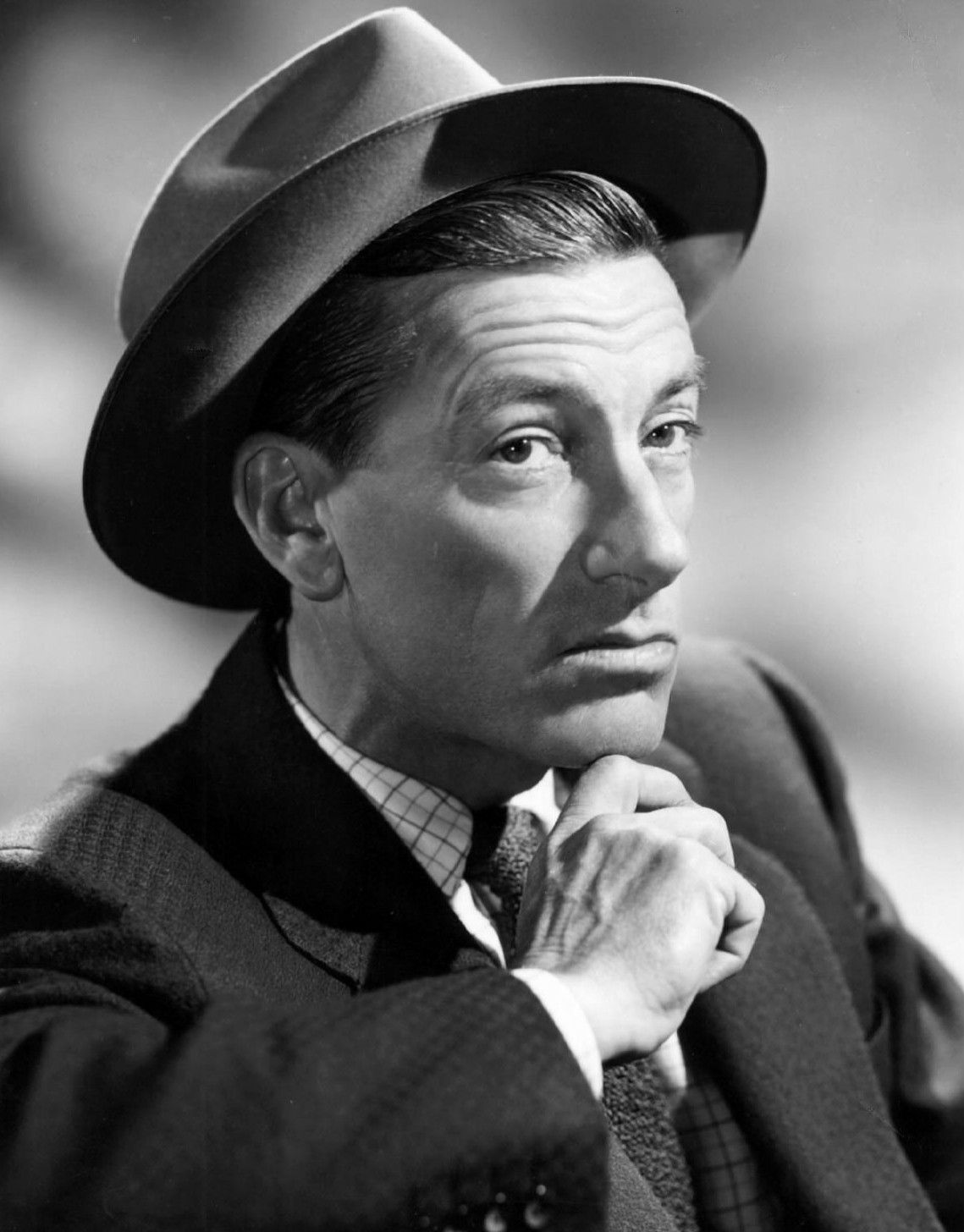
A lifelong fan of Hoagy Carmichael, Harrison covered Carmichael's "Hong Kong Blues" and "Baltimore Oriole" on his 1981 album Somewhere in England.

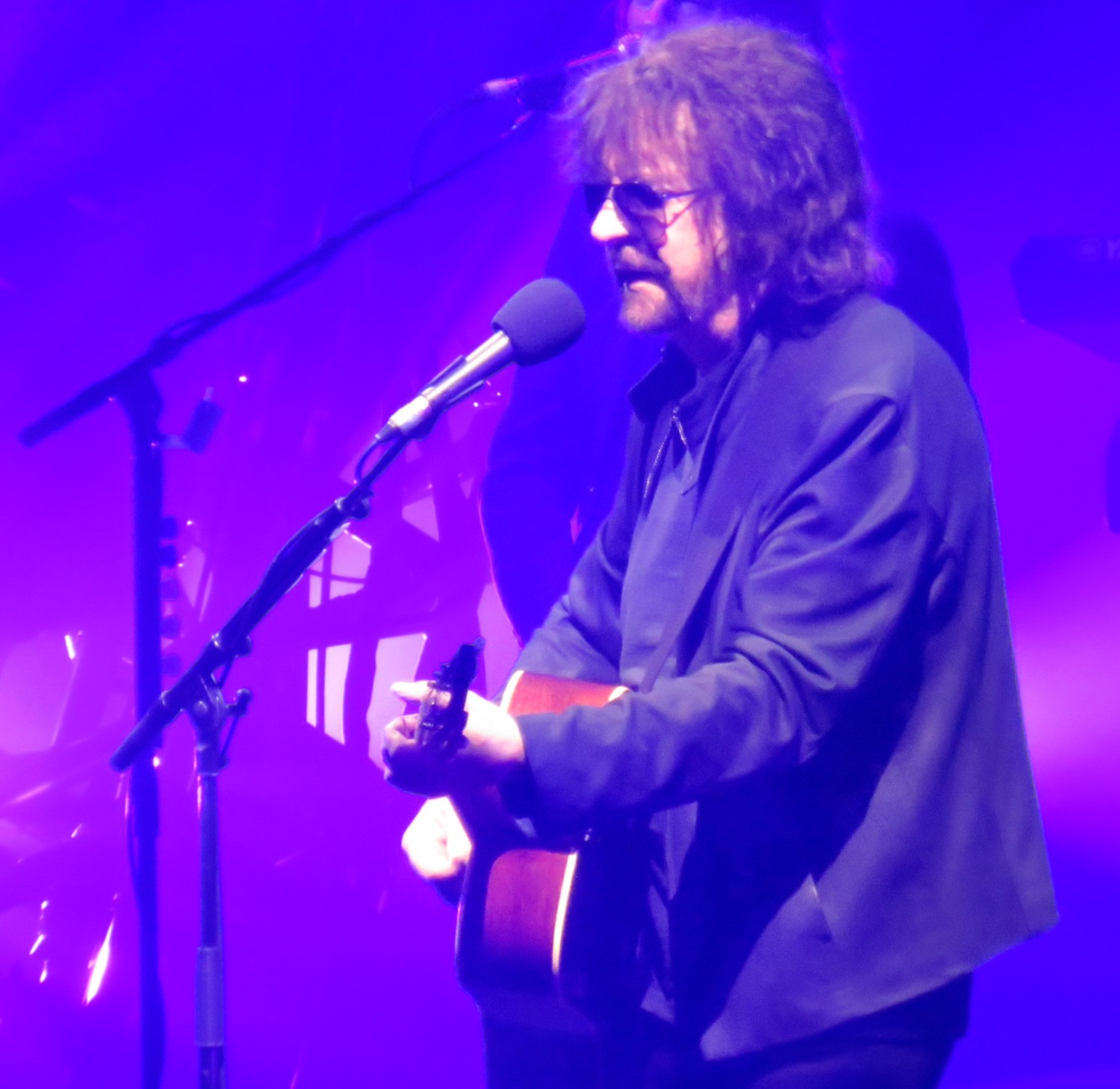
From 1987, Harrison collaborated regularly with producer Jeff Lynne, who co-wrote "When We Was Fab" and "This Is Love".

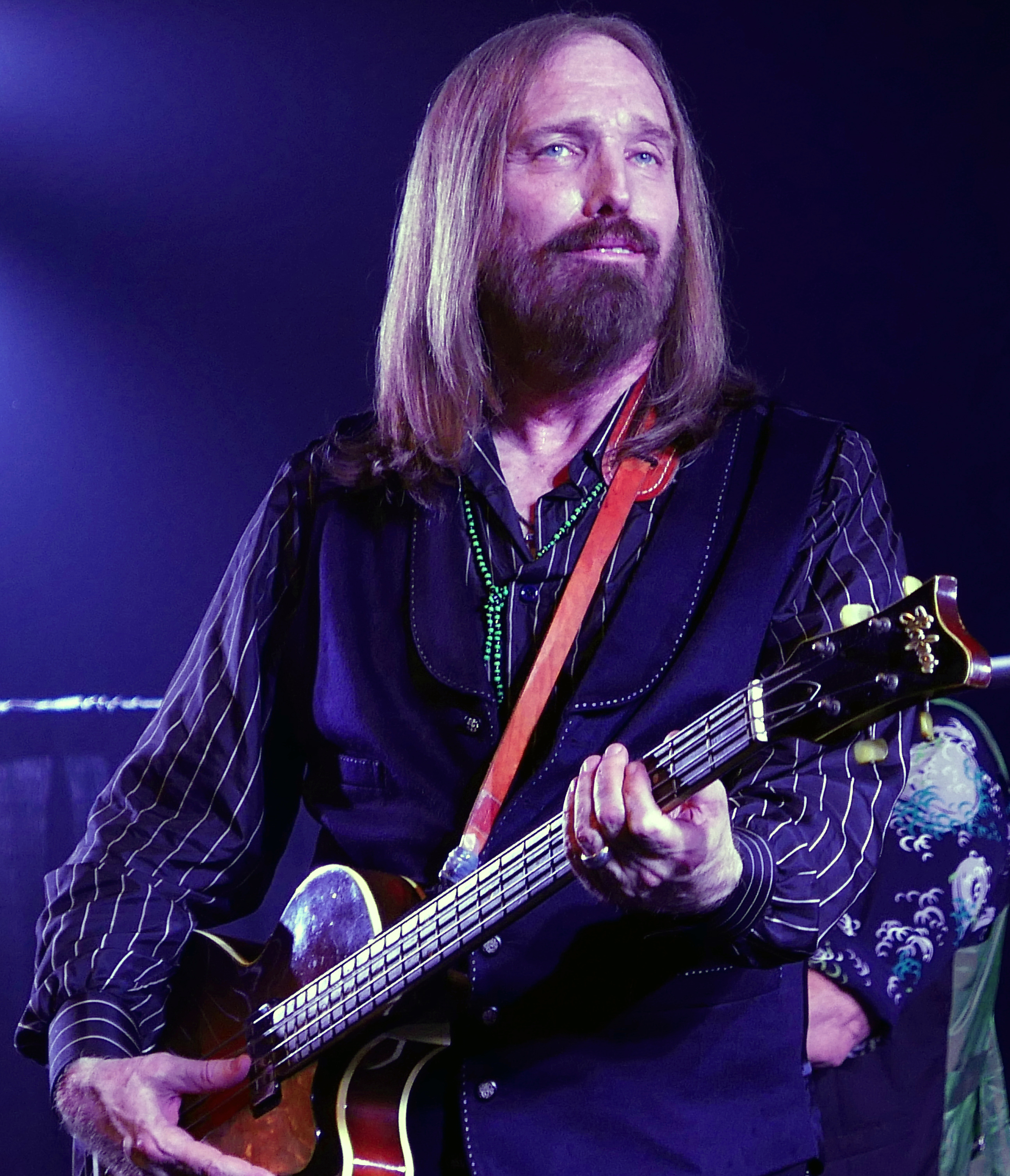
Tom Petty co-wrote "Cheer Down" with Harrison, in addition to joining him, Lynne and Dylan in the Traveling Wilburys.

Name of song, writer(s), original release, and year of release
Song	Writer(s)	Original release	Year	Ref(s)
"Absolutely Sweet Marie" (live)	Bob Dylan †	Bob Dylan – The 30th Anniversary Concert Celebration	1993	
"All Things Must Pass"	George Harrison	All Things Must Pass	1970	
"All Those Years Ago"	George Harrison	Somewhere in England	1981	
"Almost 12 Bar Honky Tonk" ‡	George Harrison	All Things Must Pass (50th anniversary deluxe edition)	2021	
"Almost Shankara" ‡	George Harrison	Wonderwall Music (2014 remaster)	2014	
"The Answer's at the End"	George Harrison	Extra Texture (Read All About It)	1975	
"Any Road"	George Harrison	Brainwashed	2002	
"Apple Scruffs"	George Harrison	All Things Must Pass	1970	
"Art of Dying"	George Harrison	All Things Must Pass	1970	
"Awaiting on You All"	George Harrison	All Things Must Pass	1970	
"Baby Don't Run Away"	George Harrison	Gone Troppo	1982	
"Ballad of Sir Frankie Crisp (Let It Roll)"	George Harrison	All Things Must Pass	1970	
"Baltimore Oriole"	Hoagy Carmichael †	Somewhere in England	1981	
"Bangla Desh"	George Harrison	Non-album single	1971	
"Be Here Now"	George Harrison	Living in the Material World	1973	
"Beautiful Girl"	George Harrison	Thirty Three & 1/3	1976	
"Behind That Locked Door"	George Harrison	All Things Must Pass	1970	
"Between the Devil and the Deep Blue Sea"	Harold Arlen; Ted Koehler †	Brainwashed	2002	
"Beware of Darkness"	George Harrison	All Things Must Pass	1970	
"A Bit More of You" ‡	George Harrison	Extra Texture (Read All About It)	1975	
"Blood from a Clone"	George Harrison	Somewhere in England	1981	
"Blow Away"	George Harrison	George Harrison	1979	
"Brainwashed"	George Harrison	Brainwashed	2002	
"Breath Away from Heaven"	George Harrison	Cloud Nine	1987	
"Bye Bye, Love"	Felice Bryant; Boudleaux Bryant; George Harrison †	Dark Horse	1974	
"Can't Stop Thinking About You"	George Harrison	Extra Texture (Read All About It)	1975	
"Cheer Down"	George Harrison; Tom Petty †	Lethal Weapon 2 (soundtrack)	1989	
"Circles"	George Harrison	Gone Troppo	1982	
"Cloud 9"	George Harrison	Cloud Nine	1987	
"Cockamamie Business"	George Harrison	Best of Dark Horse 1976–1989	1989	
"Cosmic Empire" (demo)	George Harrison	All Things Must Pass (50th anniversary deluxe edition)	2021	
"Cowboy Music" ‡	George Harrison	Wonderwall Music	1968	
"Crackerbox Palace"	George Harrison	Thirty Three & 1/3	1976	
"Crying" ‡	George Harrison	Wonderwall Music	1968	
"Dark Horse"	George Harrison	Dark Horse	1974	
"Dark Sweet Lady"	George Harrison	George Harrison	1979	
"The Day the World Gets 'Round"	George Harrison	Living in the Material World	1973	
"Dear One"	George Harrison	Thirty Three & 1/3	1976	
"Deep Blue"	George Harrison	Non-album single B-side of "Bangla Desh"	1971	
"Dehra Dun" (demo)	George Harrison	All Things Must Pass (50th anniversary deluxe edition)	2021	
"Devil's Radio"	George Harrison	Cloud Nine	1987	
"Ding Dong, Ding Dong"	George Harrison	Dark Horse	1974	
"Don't Let Me Wait Too Long"	George Harrison	Living in the Material World	1973	
"Down to the River (Rocking Chair Blues)"	George Harrison	All Things Must Pass (50th anniversary deluxe edition)	2021	
"Dream Away"	George Harrison	Gone Troppo	1982	
"Dream Scene" ‡	George Harrison	Wonderwall Music	1968	
"Drilling a Home" ‡	George Harrison	Wonderwall Music	1968	
"Everybody-Nobody" (demo)	George Harrison	All Things Must Pass (50th anniversary deluxe edition)	2021	
"Fantasy Sequins" ‡	George Harrison	Wonderwall Music	1968	
"Far East Man"	George Harrison	Dark Horse	1974	
"Faster"	George Harrison	George Harrison	1979	
"Fish on the Sand"	George Harrison	Cloud Nine	1987	
"Flying Hour" (remix)	George Harrison; Mick Ralphs †	Songs by George Harrison	1988	
"For You Blue" (Note: Originally recorded by the Beatles.) (live)	George Harrison	Songs by George Harrison	1988	
"Gat Kirwani" ‡	George Harrison	Wonderwall Music	1968	
"Get Back"	John Lennon; Paul McCartney †	All Things Must Pass (50th anniversary deluxe edition)	2021	
"Give Me Love (Give Me Peace on Earth)"	George Harrison	Living in the Material World	1973	
"Glass Box" ‡	George Harrison	Wonderwall Music	1968	
"Going Down to Golders Green" (demo)	George Harrison	All Things Must Pass (50th anniversary deluxe edition)	2021	
"Gone Troppo"	George Harrison	Gone Troppo	1982	
"Got My Mind Set on You"	Rudy Clark †	Cloud Nine	1987	
"Greasy Legs" ‡	George Harrison	Wonderwall Music	1968	
"Greece"	George Harrison	Gone Troppo	1982	
"Grey Cloudy Lies"	George Harrison	Extra Texture (Read All About It)	1975	
"Guru Vandana" ‡	George Harrison	Wonderwall Music	1968	
"Hari's on Tour (Express)" ‡	George Harrison	Dark Horse	1974	
"Hear Me Lord"	George Harrison	All Things Must Pass	1970	
"Here Comes the Sun" (live)	George Harrison	The Concert for Bangladesh	1971	
"Here Comes the Moon"	George Harrison	George Harrison	1979	
"His Name Is Legs (Ladies and Gentlemen)" (Note: Features a spoken word section by Legs Larry Smith.)	George Harrison	Extra Texture (Read All About It)	1975	
"Hong Kong Blues"	Hoagy Carmichael †	Somewhere in England	1981	
"Horse to the Water" (with Jools Holland)	George Harrison; Dhani Harrison	Small World Big Band	2001	
"Hottest Gong in Town"	George Harrison	Songs by George Harrison 2	1992	
"I Dig Love"	George Harrison	All Things Must Pass	1970	
"I Don't Care Anymore"	George Harrison	Non-album single B-side of "Dark Horse" (US) and "Ding Dong, Ding Dong" (UK)	1974	
"I Don't Want to Do It"	Bob Dylan †	Porky's Revenge! (soundtrack)	1985	
"I Live for You"	George Harrison	All Things Must Pass (2001 remaster)	2001	
"I Really Love You"	Leroy Swearingen †	Gone Troppo	1982	
"I Remember Jeep" ‡	George Harrison	All Things Must Pass	1970	
"I Want to Tell You" (live)	George Harrison	Live in Japan	1992	
"If I Needed Someone" (live)	George Harrison	Live in Japan	1992	
"If Not for You"	Bob Dylan †	All Things Must Pass	1970	
"If You Believe"	George Harrison; Gary Wright †	George Harrison	1979	
"In the Park" ‡	George Harrison	Wonderwall Music	1968	
"It Is 'He' (Jai Sri Krishna)"	George Harrison	Dark Horse	1974	
"Isn't It a Pity" (Note: Two versions of the song appear on All Things Must Pass.)	George Harrison	All Things Must Pass	1970	
"It's Johnny's Birthday"	George Harrison; Bill Martin; Phil Coulter †	All Things Must Pass	1970	
"It's What You Value"	George Harrison	Thirty Three & 1/3	1976	
"I'd Have You Anytime"	George Harrison; Bob Dylan †	All Things Must Pass	1970	
"Just for Today"	George Harrison	Cloud Nine	1987	
"Lay His Head"	George Harrison	Non-album single B-side of "Got My Mind Set on You"	1987	
"Learning How to Love You"	George Harrison	Thirty Three & 1/3	1976	
"Let It Be Me" (demo)	Gilbert Bécaud; Pierre Leroyer; Manny Kurtz †	Early Takes: Volume 1	2012	
"Let It Down"	George Harrison	All Things Must Pass	1970	
"Life Itself"	George Harrison	Somewhere in England	1981	
"The Light That Has Lighted the World"	George Harrison	Living in the Material World	1973	
"Living in the Material World"	George Harrison	Living in the Material World	1973	
"Looking for My Life"	George Harrison	Brainwashed	2002	
"The Lord Loves the One (That Loves the Lord)"	George Harrison	Living in the Material World	1973	
"Love Comes to Everyone"	George Harrison	George Harrison	1979	
"Love Scene" ‡	George Harrison	Wonderwall Music	1968	
"Mama You've Been on My Mind" (demo)	Bob Dylan †	Early Takes: Volume 1	2012	
"Marwa Blues" ‡	George Harrison	Brainwashed	2002	
"Māya Love"	George Harrison	Dark Horse	1974	
"Microbes" ‡	George Harrison	Wonderwall Music	1968	
"Miss O'Dell"	George Harrison	Non-album single B-side of "Give Me Love (Give Me Peace on Earth)"	1973	
"Mo"	George Harrison	Mo's Songs	1994	
"Mother Divine" (demo)	George Harrison	All Things Must Pass (50th anniversary deluxe edition)	2021	
"My Sweet Lord" (Note: A re-recorded version, titled "My Sweet Lord (2000)", was released on the 2001 remaster of All Things Must Pass.)	George Harrison	All Things Must Pass	1970	
"Mystical One"	George Harrison	Gone Troppo	1982	
"Never Get Over You"	George Harrison	Brainwashed	2002	
"No Time or Space" ‡	George Harrison	Electronic Sound	1969	
"Not Guilty"	George Harrison	George Harrison	1979	
"Nowhere to Go" (demo)	George Harrison; Bob Dylan †	All Things Must Pass (50th anniversary deluxe edition)	2021	
"Old Brown Shoe" (live)	George Harrison	Live in Japan	1992	
"Om Hare Om (Gopala Krishna)" (demo)	George Harrison	All Things Must Pass (50th anniversary deluxe edition)	2021	
"On the Bed" ‡	George Harrison	Wonderwall Music	1968	
"Ooh Baby (You Know That I Love You)"	George Harrison	Extra Texture (Read All About It)	1975	
"Out of the Blue" ‡	George Harrison	All Things Must Pass	1970	
"P2 Vatican Blues (Last Saturday Night)"	George Harrison	Brainwashed	2002	
"Party Seacombe" ‡	George Harrison	Wonderwall Music	1968	
"Piggies" (live)	George Harrison	Live in Japan	1992	
"Pisces Fish"	George Harrison	Brainwashed	2002	
"Plug Me In" ‡	George Harrison	All Things Must Pass	1970	
"Poor Little Girl"	George Harrison	Best of Dark Horse 1976–1989	1989	
"Pure Smokey"	George Harrison	Thirty Three & 1/3	1976	
"Red Lady Too" ‡	George Harrison	Wonderwall Music	1968	
"Ride Rajbun"	George Harrison; David English †	The Bunbury Tails	1992	
"Rising Sun"	George Harrison	Brainwashed	2002	
"Rocking Chair in Hawaii"	George Harrison	Brainwashed	2002	
"Roll Over Beethoven" (live)	Chuck Berry †	Live in Japan	1992	
"Run of the Mill"	George Harrison	All Things Must Pass	1970	
"Run So Far"	George Harrison	Brainwashed	2002	
"Sat Singing" (remix)	George Harrison	Songs by George Harrison	1988	
"Save the World"	George Harrison	Somewhere in England	1981	
"See Yourself"	George Harrison	Thirty Three & 1/3	1976	
"Shanghai Surprise"	George Harrison	Non-album promotional single	1986	
"Simply Shady"	George Harrison	Dark Horse	1974	
"Singing Om" ‡	George Harrison	Wonderwall Music	1968	
"Ski-ing" ‡	George Harrison	Wonderwall Music	1968	
"So Sad"	George Harrison	Dark Horse	1974	
"Soft-Hearted Hana"	George Harrison	George Harrison	1979	
"Soft Touch"	George Harrison	George Harrison	1979	
"Someplace Else"	George Harrison	Cloud Nine	1987	
"Something" (live)	George Harrison	The Concert for Bangladesh	1971	
"Sour Milk Sea" (Jackie Lomax)	George Harrison	Non-album single	1968	
"Stuck Inside a Cloud"	George Harrison	Brainwashed	2002	
"Sue Me, Sue You Blues"	George Harrison	Living in the Material World	1973	
"Sunshine Life for Me (Sail Away Raymond)"	George Harrison	Living in the Material World (50th anniversary deluxe edition)	2023	
"Tabla and Pakavaj" ‡	George Harrison	Wonderwall Music	1968	
"Taxman" (live)	George Harrison	Live in Japan	1992	
"Teardrops"	George Harrison	Somewhere in England	1981	
"Tears of the World"	George Harrison	Songs by George Harrison 2	1992	
"Tell Me What Has Happened to You" (demo)	George Harrison	All Things Must Pass (50th anniversary deluxe edition)	2021	
"Thanks for the Pepperoni" ‡	George Harrison	All Things Must Pass	1970	
"That Is All"	George Harrison	Living in the Material World	1973	
"That Which I Have Lost"	George Harrison	Somewhere in England	1981	
"That's the Way It Goes"	George Harrison	Gone Troppo	1982	
"That's What It Takes"	George Harrison; Jeff Lynne; Gary Wright †	Cloud Nine	1987	
"This Guitar (Can't Keep from Crying)"	George Harrison	Extra Texture (Read All About It)	1975	
"This Is Love"	George Harrison; Jeff Lynne †	Cloud Nine	1987	
"This Song"	George Harrison	Thirty Three & 1/3	1976	
"Tired of Midnight Blue"	George Harrison	Extra Texture (Read All About It)	1975	
"True Love"	Cole Porter †	Thirty Three & 1/3	1976	
"Try Some, Buy Some"	George Harrison	Living in the Material World	1971	
"Unconsciousness Rules"	George Harrison	Somewhere in England	1981	
"Under the Mersey Wall" ‡	George Harrison	Electronic Sound	1969	
"Unknown Delight"	George Harrison	Gone Troppo	1982	
"Wah-Wah"	George Harrison	All Things Must Pass	1970	
"Wake Up My Love"	George Harrison	Gone Troppo	1982	
"Wedding Bells (Are Breaking Up That Old Gang of Mine)"	Sammy Fain; Irving Kahal; Willie Raskin †	All Things Must Pass (50th anniversary deluxe edition)	2021	
"What Is Life"	George Harrison	All Things Must Pass	1970	
"When We Was Fab"	George Harrison; Jeff Lynne †	Cloud Nine	1987	
"While My Guitar Gently Weeps" (live)	George Harrison	The Concert for Bangladesh	1971	
"Who Can See It"	George Harrison	Living in the Material World	1973	
"Window Window" (demo)	George Harrison	All Things Must Pass (50th anniversary deluxe edition)	2021	
"Woman Don't You Cry for Me"	George Harrison	Thirty Three & 1/3	1976	
"Wonderwall to Be Here" ‡	George Harrison	Wonderwall Music	1968	
"World of Stone"	George Harrison	Extra Texture (Read All About It)	1975	
"Wreck of the Hesperus"	George Harrison	Cloud Nine	1987	
"Writing's on the Wall"	George Harrison	Somewhere in England	1981	
"You"	George Harrison	Extra Texture (Read All About It)	1975	
"Your Love Is Forever"	George Harrison	George Harrison	1979	
"Zig Zag"	George Harrison; Jeff Lynne †	Non-album single B-side of "When We Was Fab"	1988	

== Bibliography ==
- Allison, Dale C. Jr. (2006). The Love There That's Sleeping: The Art and Spirituality of George Harrison. New York, NY: Continuum. ISBN 978-0-8264-1917-0.
- Bogdanov, Vladimir; Woodstra, Chris; Erlewine, Stephen Thomas (2002). All Music Guide to Rock. Backbeat Books. ISBN 978-0-87930-653-3.
- Clayson, Alan (2003). George Harrison. London: Sanctuary. ISBN 1-86074-489-3.
- Doggett, Peter (2011). You Never Give Me Your Money: The Beatles After the Breakup. New York, NY: It Books. ISBN 978-0-06-177418-8.
- The Editors of Rolling Stone (2002). Harrison. New York, NY: Rolling Stone Press. ISBN 978-0-7432-3581-5.
- Frontani, Michael (2009). "The Solo Years". In Womack, Kenneth (ed.). The Cambridge Companion to the Beatles. Cambridge, UK: Cambridge University Press. ISBN 978-0-521-68976-2.
- Greene, Joshua M. (2006). Here Comes the Sun: The Spiritual and Musical Journey of George Harrison. Hoboken, NJ: John Wiley & Sons. ISBN 978-0-470-12780-3.
- Harry, Bill (2003). The George Harrison Encyclopedia. London: Virgin Books. ISBN 978-0-7535-0822-0.
- Huntley, Elliot J. (2006). Mystical One: George Harrison – After the Break-up of the Beatles. Toronto, ON: Guernica Editions. ISBN 978-1-55071-197-4.
- Ingham, Chris (2006). The Rough Guide to the Beatles. London: Rough Guides/Penguin. ISBN 978-1-84836-525-4.
- Inglis, Ian (2010). The Words and Music of George Harrison. Praeger Publishers. ISBN 978-0-313-37532-3.
- Lavezzoli, Peter (2006). The Dawn of Indian Music in the West. New York, NY: Continuum. ISBN 0-8264-2819-3.
- Leng, Simon (2006). While My Guitar Gently Weeps: The Music of George Harrison. Milwaukee, WI: Hal Leonard. ISBN 1-4234-0609-5.
- Rodriguez, Robert (2010). Fab Four FAQ 2.0: The Beatles' Solo Years, 1970–1980. Milwaukee, WI: Backbeat Books. ISBN 978-1-4165-9093-4.
- Schaffner, Nicholas (1978). The Beatles Forever. New York, NY: McGraw-Hill. ISBN 0-07-055087-5.
- Tillery, Gary (2011). Working Class Mystic: A Spiritual Biography of George Harrison. Wheaton, IL: Quest Books. ISBN 978-0-8356-0900-5.
- Woffinden, Bob (1981). The Beatles Apart. London: Proteus. ISBN 0-906071-89-5.
