= Dream Away =

Dream Away may refer to:

- "Dream Away" (George Harrison song), 1982
- "Dream Away" (Babyface and Lisa Stansfield song), 1994
- A Dream Away, an album by The Juliana Theory
