= That's the Way It Goes (George Harrison song) =

Song by George Harrison

from the album Gone Troppo
- Released: 5 November 1982
- Genre: Rock, pop
- Length: 3:34
- Label: Dark Horse
- Songwriter: George Harrison
- Producers: George Harrison, Ray Cooper, Phil McDonald

Gone Troppo track listing
- 10 tracks Side one: 1. "Wake Up My Love"; 2. "That's the Way It Goes"; 3. "I Really Love You"; 4. "Greece"; 5. "Gone Troppo"; Side two: 6. "Mystical One"; 7. "Unknown Delight"; 8. "Baby Don't Run Away"; 9. "Dream Away"; 10. "Circles"

"That's the Way It Goes" is a song by English musician George Harrison from his 1982 album Gone Troppo. Harrison wrote the song during a period when he had become uninterested in contemporary music and was enjoying success as a film producer with his company HandMade Films. Partly influenced by his extended holidays in Hawaii and Australia, the lyrics convey his dismay at the world's preoccupation with money and status, although, unlike several of Harrison's previous musical statements on the subject, he expresses resignation and acceptance.

Harrison recorded the song at his Friar Park studio in 1982. The track includes contributions from British musicians such as Henry Spinetti, Herbie Flowers and Ray Cooper, along with a deep-toned vocal part from American gospel singer Willie Greene. Indicating Harrison's enduring admiration for the song, it was one of the B-sides of the 12-inch single "When We Was Fab" in 1988, and he subsequently included it on his compilation album Best of Dark Horse 1976–1989.

Among retrospective appraisals of Harrison's musical career, several commentators have identified "That's the Way It Goes" as a highlight of Gone Troppo. In November 2002, a year after Harrison's death, Joe Brown performed the song at the Concert for George in London. Its inclusion marked a rare example of a post-1973 Harrison song being performed at that tribute concert.

== Background and inspiration ==
George Harrison wrote "That's the Way It Goes" and other songs for his Gone Troppo album during a period when his interest in contemporary popular music had diminished in favour of a part-time career as a film producer, with the success of his company HandMade Films. In a television interview to promote HandMade's Time Bandits in December 1981, Harrison described himself as an "ex-pop star" and a "peace-seeker, gardener, ex-celeb". The songs he wrote for the album reflected his time spent holidaying in Australia and in Hawaii, where he owned a property near Hana on the island of Maui.

In his book on Harrison for the Praeger Singer-Songwriter series, Ian Inglis groups "That's the Way It Goes" with the title track to Gone Troppo and "Mystical One" as songs that offer "a clear insight into his frame of mind" at this time. Inglis continues:

Here is a man who has lived through the extravagances of the 1960s, received global acclaim for the humanitarian and spiritual facets of his music, experienced the darker side of popular music's excesses, seen the murder of one of his closest friends [John Lennon], and has now settled on a life away from the constant spotlight of public scrutiny.

== Composition ==
Harrison biographer Simon Leng considers "That's the Way It Goes" to be a social commentary that conveys the artist's withdrawal from the "money madness of the '80s" as typified by the anti-societal policies of British prime minister Margaret Thatcher. The song's title is a phrase typically used in British English to convey resignation at an unfortunate or unjust situation. The composition consists of four verses in which Harrison laments the world's preoccupation with money and status. After each verse, the line "And that's the way it goes" is followed by an instrumental break in which Harrison's slide guitar further voices his reluctant acceptance. Unusually for a Harrison composition, the song employs only primary chords. Despite this straightforward quality, musicologist Thomas MacFarlane recognises its "subtle metrical shifts and surprising melodic turns".

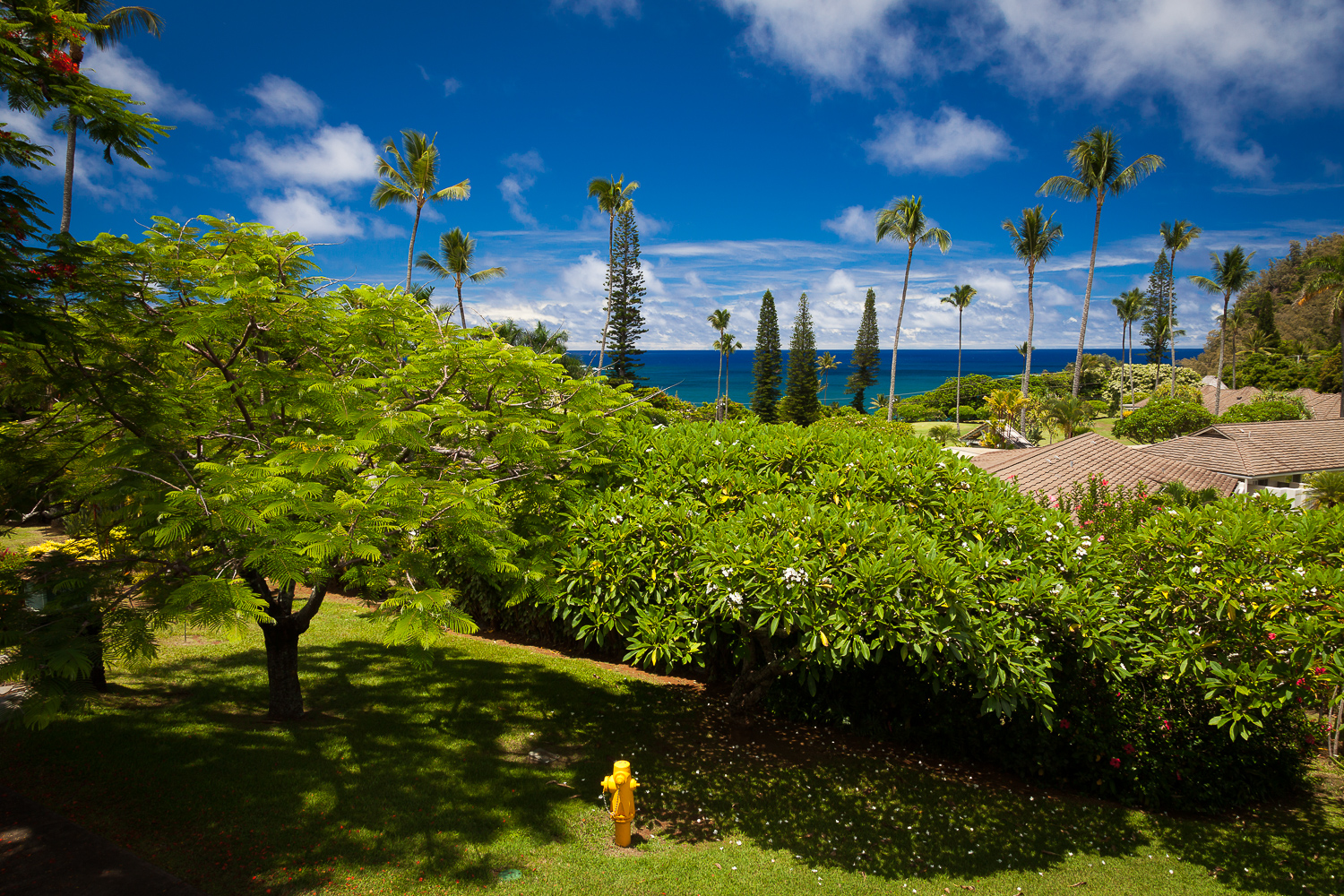
Hana, Hawaii. Harrison drew part of his inspiration for the song from the tranquility he experienced at Hana, on the island of Maui, together with Hawaiian music.

The first three verses of the song depict a different character, each seemingly at a spiritual malaise in their attempts to attain wealth or advance their position. In the opening verse, Harrison sings of a man preoccupied with his financial losses on the stock market. The next character is a speculator who intends to purchase "the promised land" with his South African Krugerrand, and then develop and sell it on for a profit. In the third verse, a film actor aspires to achieve stardom in the form of "a shining city on a hill", yet the starring roles he seeks merely bury his sense of individuality. According to theologian Dale Allison, the lyrics suggest that Harrison pities the first of these three individuals yet has only contempt for the speculator.

In the final verse, Harrison sings of "a fire that burns away the lies" and is "manifested in the spiritual eye". He adds that, by failing to perceive material things as secondary in importance to spiritual transcendence, people hide "all there is to know". Unlike in his early-1970s songs "The Lord Loves the One (That Loves the Lord)", "Awaiting on You All" and "The Day the World Gets 'Round", Harrison refrains from trying to convert these people from their apparent misconception. Instead, he has resigned himself to being misunderstood and accepts that he cannot change their perspective. Allison likens this approach to the lyrical content of Harrison's 1980 composition "Save the World", whereby the singer, having expressed his concern for problems afflicting the material world, concludes with a message of "personal piety [that] is really a sign of surrender, the end of all political idealism".

Leng writes that, in contrast to the mood of resignation in the lyrics, the musical aspects of "That's the Way It Goes" are "richly positive". These include the song's slide guitar solos, which, typically of Harrison's playing on Gone Troppo, reflect his absorption in Pacific musical cultures, particularly Hawaiian music. Leng highlights the solos for their variety in musical style and nuance, citing a country influence in Harrison's second break and, later in the song, "obvious inflections from Indian music" through Harrison's incorporation of gamak.

== Recording ==
Having spent the New Year on Hamilton Island in Australia, Harrison and his family continued to travel for much of early 1982, including making a visit to Los Angeles where he received an award from UNICEF in recognition of his 1971 benefit concert for the fledgling nation of Bangladesh. Harrison then recorded the track at his Friar Park studio, FPSHOT, in Oxfordshire, during sessions held between 5 May and 27 August 1982. Authors Chip Madinger and Mark Easter write that Harrison set out to make "a friendly, buoyant album, even a commercial one at times", possibly in reaction to Warner Bros. Records' initial rejection of his previous album, Somewhere in England.

Aside from Harrison, the musicians playing on "That's the Way It Goes" were Mike Moran (on keyboards), Ray Cooper (percussion), Herbie Flowers (bass) and Henry Spinetti (drums). According to Leng, the line-up of mainly English musicians on Gone Troppo was further evidence of Harrison's limited interest in music during this period, with many of the new acquaintances having come through Cooper, who also had an executive role at HandMade. (Note: Cooper later said that when offering him the position, Harrison described it as "be[ing] me in the office".) Harrison's musical contributions to the recording included all the guitar parts on the song, as well as synthesizer.

Leng describes the musical arrangement as typical of Harrison's work at the time: "layers of acoustic guitars topped by picking light electrics, understated keyboards, and lots of slide riffs". In addition, the track includes occasional vocal interjections (credited as "bass voice") performed by Willie Greene, a gospel bass singer whom Harrison recruited from slide guitarist Ry Cooder's touring band. (Note: Harrison had long been a fan of Cooder, particularly his Hawaiian-influenced album Chicken Skin Music (1976). Accompanied by Ringo Starr, Harrison attended one of the London concerts by Cooder and his band in June 1982.) In MacFarlane's view, the recording shares the "sunny and carefree" Pacific mood of the album's title track and "evokes palm trees, ocean surf, and gentle breezes ... the kind of environment in which one can find renewal and peace".

== Release and reception ==
Warner Bros. Records issued Gone Troppo on Harrison's Dark Horse label on 5 November 1982. "That's the Way It Goes" was sequenced as the second track, between the album's lead single, "Wake Up My Love", and Harrison's cover of "I Really Love You", a 1961 hit for the Stereos. The album was little noticed at the time, due to Harrison's refusal to promote the release and Warner's similarly carrying out minimal promotion. Gone Troppo became Harrison's last album for five years, during which he continued to focus on film production, while making occasional musical contributions to film soundtracks.

In preparation for the release of his 1987 comeback album, Cloud Nine, Harrison remixed the song for inclusion on the European CD and 12-inch vinyl formats of his "When We Was Fab" single, released in January 1988. For this new mix, Harrison and Jeff Lynne increased the presence of the drums and added snapback echo on the lead vocal. Madinger and Easter view Harrison's choosing to return to the track, five years after its recording, as evidence that he "rather cherished" the song. In another indication of his personal preferences, "That's the Way It Goes" appeared on the 1989 compilation album Best of Dark Horse. The 1982 mix was used for this release.

"That's the Way It Goes" was among the 35 songs that Harrison shortlisted to play on his 1991 Japanese tour with Eric Clapton, which was Harrison's first concert tour since 1974. Harrison, Clapton and the latter's band rehearsed the song at Bray Studios in Berkshire, but it was not performed at any of the subsequent shows.

== Retrospective assessment and legacy ==
Writing shortly after Harrison's death in November 2001, music journalist Rip Rense cited the track as evidence that "All his albums, even the rather hasty 'Extra Texture,' and the post-scripty 'Gone Troppo,' contain some of the most affecting moments in his career." Reviewing Harrison's solo releases in 2004, for Blender magazine, Paul Du Noyer considered the song to be the album's "standout track". Among reviews of the Dark Horse Years Harrison reissues that same year, Kit Aiken of Uncut described Gone Troppo as a "return to form of sorts" after Somewhere in England and viewed the song as "the sort of strumalong fatalistic shrug George had made his own". Conversely, Music Box editor John Metzger dismissed Gone Troppo as "undoubtedly the worst of George Harrison's solo albums", although he considered "That's the Way It Goes" to be one of the few tracks that might have succeeded with a less-polished musical arrangement.

Nick DeRiso of the music website Something Else! admires the song as "a potent rumination" on slide guitar. He adds that Harrison's mood of acceptance in the lyrics marks "a remarkable departure for a performer best known for a determined kind of proselytizing" through songs such as "Awaiting on You All", "Living in the Material World" and "That Which I Have Lost". Simon Leng rates "That's the Way It Goes" as "the highlight of the LP". Amid his praise for Harrison's guitar solos on the track, Lengs concludes:

Ironically, it was Ry Cooder who underlined the obvious proximity between Harrison's slide sound and Indian phrasing. If there's one instrumental album that George Harrison may have dreamed of recording, it is probably Cooder's Meeting by the River, a collaboration with Indian slide maestro V.M. Bhatt … That was a 1993 disc – with "That's the Way It Goes," Harrison had shown that he was the true pioneer of honestly incorporating Indian music into Western rock.

Ian Inglis includes "That's the Way It Goes" among Harrison's "often overlooked" songs that possess "great charm, energy, and beauty".

== Concert for George performance ==
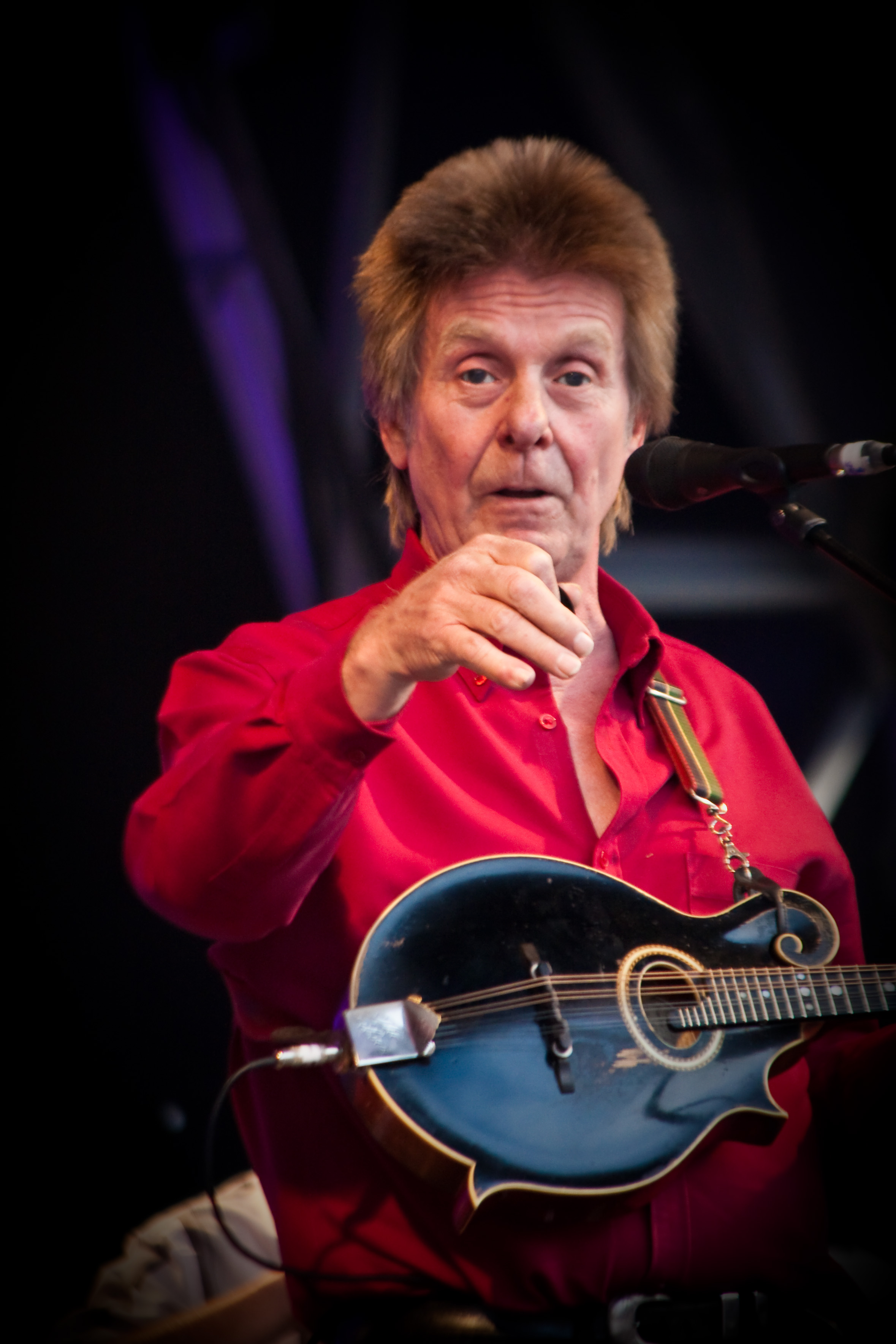
Joe Brown (pictured in 2010) performed the song at the Harrison tribute concert in November 2002.

"That's the Way It Goes" was the only song from Harrison's post-1973 releases to be played at the Concert for George tribute, where it was performed by English singer Joe Brown, a near-neighbour of Harrison's in Henley-on-Thames since the 1980s. The concert was organised by Clapton and took place at London's Royal Albert Hall on 29 November 2002, exactly a year after Harrison's death. Brown played mandolin on the song, as he had on the Gone Troppo track "Mystical One" in 1982. His backing musicians included Andy Fairweather-Low (on slide guitar) and drummer Phil Capaldi, the brother of Harrison's occasional late-career collaborator Jim Capaldi. (Note: Brown and Capaldi were part of Harrison's coterie of local rock stars known as "the Henley Music Mafia", with whom he occasionally gave informal live performances in his years away from the public eye. Other members included Jon Lord, who also played on Gone Troppo.)

Brown's performance of "That's the Way It Goes" was omitted from the theatrical release of David Leland's documentary Concert for George in 2003, but included on the two-disc DVD, issued in November that year. Inglis comments that his "informal sing-along style" was a good match for the song's "casual tone and relaxed outlook"; Allison similarly considers that Brown "reprised [the song] wonderfully". In addition to playing "Here Comes the Sun", Brown also performed the concert's closing song, "I'll See You in My Dreams". For the latter, Brown played a ukulele, a Hawaiian instrument with which Harrison was strongly associated from the 1980s onwards. (Note: Explaining their long friendship in January 2000, shortly after Harrison had been the victim of a knife attack by an intruder at Friar Park, Brown said he and Harrison were not "musical snobs". He said they bonded over shared musical tastes that included ukulele exponent George Formby and Hoagy Carmichael, as well as Carl Perkins and Elvis Presley.)

Brown released another live version of "That's the Way It Goes" on his 2011 concert DVD/CD set Live in Liverpool. Mojo included Brown's recording of the song on Harrison Covered, a tribute CD accompanying the November 2011 issue of the magazine.

== Personnel ==
According to the Gone Troppo album credits:

- George Harrison – vocals, acoustic and electric guitars, slide guitars, synthesizer, backing vocals
- Mike Moran – piano, synthesizer
- Herbie Flowers – bass
- Henry Spinetti – drums
- Ray Cooper – percussion
- Willie Greene – bass voice

== Sources ==
- Dale C. Allison Jr, The Love There That's Sleeping: The Art and Spirituality of George Harrison, Continuum (New York, NY, 2006; ISBN 978-0-8264-1917-0).
- Keith Badman, The Beatles Diary Volume 2: After the Break-Up 1970–2001, Omnibus Press (London, 2001; ISBN 0-7119-8307-0).
- Alan Clayson, George Harrison, Sanctuary (London, 2003; ISBN 1-86074-489-3).
- Peter Doggett, You Never Give Me Your Money: The Beatles After the Breakup, It Books (New York, NY, 2011; ISBN 978-0-06-177418-8).
- The Editors of Rolling Stone, Harrison, Rolling Stone Press/Simon & Schuster (New York, NY, 2002; ISBN 0-7432-3581-9).
- Olivia Harrison, George Harrison: Living in the Material World, Abrams (New York, NY, 2011; ISBN 978-1-4197-0220-4).
- Bill Harry, The George Harrison Encyclopedia, Virgin Books (London, 2003; ISBN 978-0753508220).
- Elliot J. Huntley, Mystical One: George Harrison – After the Break-up of the Beatles, Guernica Editions (Toronto, ON, 2006; ISBN 1-55071-197-0).
- Ian Inglis, The Words and Music of George Harrison, Praeger (Santa Barbara, CA, 2010; ISBN 978-0-313-37532-3).
- Colin Larkin, The Encyclopedia of Popular Music (5th edn), Omnibus Press (London, 2011; ISBN 978-0-85712-595-8).
- Thomas MacFarlane, The Music of George Harrison, Routledge (Abingdon, UK, 2019; ISBN 978-1-138-59910-9).
- Simon Leng, While My Guitar Gently Weeps: The Music of George Harrison, Hal Leonard (Milwaukee, WI, 2006; ISBN 1-4234-0609-5).
- Chip Madinger & Mark Easter, Eight Arms to Hold You: The Solo Beatles Compendium, 44.1 Productions (Chesterfield, MO, 2000; ISBN 0-615-11724-4).
- Michael Simmons, "Cry for a Shadow", Mojo, November 2011, pp. 74–87.
- Gary Tillery, Working Class Mystic: A Spiritual Biography of George Harrison, Quest Books (Wheaton, IL, 2011; ISBN 978-0-8356-0900-5).
