= Wake Up My Love =

- The German single sleeve

Single by George Harrison

from the album Gone Troppo
- B-side: "Greece"
- Released: 8 November 1982
- Recorded: 1982
- Genre: Pop
- Length: 3:36
- Label: Dark Horse
- Songwriter: George Harrison
- Producers: George Harrison; Ray Cooper; Phil McDonald

George Harrison singles chronology
"Teardrops" (1981)	"Wake Up My Love" (1982)	"I Really Love You" (1983)

Gone Troppo track listing
- 10 tracks Side one: 1. "Wake Up My Love"; 2. "That's the Way It Goes"; 3. "I Really Love You"; 4. "Greece"; 5. "Gone Troppo"; Side two: 6. "Mystical One"; 7. "Unknown Delight"; 8. "Baby Don't Run Away"; 9. "Dream Away"; 10. "Circles"

"Wake Up My Love" is a song by the English rock musician George Harrison from his tenth studio album, Gone Troppo (1982). Released as the A-side of the album's lead single, it peaked at No. 53 on the US Billboard Hot 100 but failed to chart on the UK singles chart. Harrison later included the track on his compilation album Best of Dark Horse (1989).

As with his previous single, "Teardrops", the song was an attempt by Harrison to give his music a more contemporary sound in order to satisfy the commercial concerns of Warner Bros. Records. Disillusioned with the 1980s pop scene, Harrison refused to promote the release and withdrew from music-making for more than four years.

== Critical reception ==
Cashbox described the song as "one of [Harrison's] more aggressive pop productions". Billboard called it an "offbeat pop tune, quite accessible, with synthesizers providing both the basic rhythm track and sci-fi sound effects".

Writing for Ultimate Classic Rock, critic Nick DeRiso described "Wake Up My Love" as "as dated an item as any Beatles-related '80s release this side of [Paul McCartney's] 'Spies Like Us'".

== Personnel ==
- George Harrison – vocals, guitars, bass
- Mike Moran – synthesizer, piano
- Henry Spinetti – drums
- Ray Cooper – percussion
