= The Stereos =

American pop/rock/doo-wop group

- Also known as: The Buckeyes
- Origin: Steubenville, Ohio, United States
- Genres: Pop; rock; doo-wop
- Past members: Bruce Robinson; Leroy Swearingen; Nathaniel Hicks; Ronnie Collins; Sam Profit; George Otis

The Stereos were an American pop/rock/doo-wop group from Steubenville, Ohio.

They began as The Buckeyes around 1955 with members Bruce Robinson and Ronnie Collins, and released two singles on the Cincinnati label Deluxe Records in 1957. In 1959, the group added Leroy Swearingen and released their first single as The Stereos, "A Love for Only You"; it flopped, and Swearingen left the group to be replaced by Nathaniel Hicks. Swearingen, however, wrote the song "I Really Love You", which became their biggest hit, peaking at number 15 on the U.S. Black Singles chart and number 29 on the Billboard Hot 100. They continued releasing singles up until 1968, none of which came close to reaching the success of "I Really Love You".

George Harrison covered "I Really Love You" for his 1982 album Gone Troppo.

== Members ==
- Bruce Robinson – lead vocals
- Leroy Swearingen – tenor
- Nathaniel Hicks – tenor (replaced Swearingen in 1960)
- Ronnie Collins – bass
- Sam Profit – tenor
- George Otis – baritone

== Singles ==
As The Buckeyes

- "Since I Fell for You" b/w "Be Only You" (Deluxe, 1957)
- "Dottie Baby" b/w "Begging You, Please" (Deluxe, 1957)

As The Stereos

- "A Love for Only You" b/w "Sweetpea's in Love" (Gibraltar, 1959)
- "I Really Love You" (Cub, 1961)
- "The Big Knock" (Cub, 1962)
- "Unless You Mean It" b/w "Do You Love Me" (Cub, 1962)
- "My Heart" (Robin's Nest, 1962)
- "Don't Cry Darling" (Robin's Nest, 1962)
- "Mumbling World" (World Artists, 1963)
- "Life" (Ideal, 1964, as The Sterios)
- "Don't Let It Happen to You" (Val 2, 1965)
