= I Really Love You =

1961 single by the Stereos

Single by the Stereos
- B-side: "Please Come Back to Me"
- Released: July 1961
- Recorded: 1961
- Genre: R&B; doo-wop
- Length: 2:16
- Label: Cub
- Songwriter: Leroy Swearingen

"I Really Love You"
- The Netherlands single sleeve of the song

Single by George Harrison

from the album Gone Troppo
- B-side: "Circles"
- Released: February 9, 1983
- Genre: R&B; doo-wop
- Length: 2:54
- Label: Dark Horse
- Songwriter: Leroy Swearingen
- Producers: George Harrison; Ray Cooper; Phil McDonald

George Harrison singles chronology
"Wake Up My Love" (1982)	"I Really Love You" (1983)	"I Don't Want to Do It" (1985)

Gone Troppo track listing
- 10 tracks Side one: 1. "Wake Up My Love"; 2. "That's the Way It Goes"; 3. "I Really Love You"; 4. "Greece"; 5. "Gone Troppo"; Side two: 6. "Mystical One"; 7. "Unknown Delight"; 8. "Baby Don't Run Away"; 9. "Dream Away"; 10. "Circles"

"I Really Love You" is a song written by Leroy Swearingen, and originally recorded by his Steubenville, Ohio, vocal group called the Stereos in 1961.

== Background ==
The lead vocalist on the original recording was Ronnie Collins. This song featured the percussion sounds of people walking in rhythm, first heard in the introduction, as well as between the verses and the Bridge section, and finally heard in the outro before the song's fade. The bass vocal is heard singing the doo wop nonsensical syllables, as well as the Bridge section of the song.

== Chart performance ==
The record, issued on Cub Records, a subsidiary of MGM Records, reached number 29 on the Billboard Top 40 chart and number 15 on the R&B chart.

Chart (1961)	Peak position
U.S. Billboard Hot 100	29
U.S. Billboard Hot R&B Sides	15

== George Harrison version ==
- The song was covered by former Beatle George Harrison on his tenth studio album Gone Troppo (1982). It was also released as the album's second single in the United States and the Netherlands, in February 1983, but failed to chart.
