= I Don't Want to Do It =

- Brazil picture sleeve

Single by George Harrison

from the album Porky's Revenge!
- B-side: "Queen of the Hop" (Dave Edmunds)
- Released: 22 April 1985 (US)
- Recorded: November 1984; Record Plant West, Los Angeles
- Genre: Rock
- Length: 2:51
- Label: Columbia
- Songwriter: Bob Dylan
- Producer: Dave Edmunds

George Harrison singles chronology
"I Really Love You" (1983)	"I Don't Want to Do It" (1985)	"Shanghai Surprise" (1986)

I Don't Want to Do It is a song written by Bob Dylan and performed by George Harrison for the Porky's Revenge! soundtrack, released in 1985. It was issued as a single in the United States and some other countries, but failed to chart.

== History ==
"I Don't Want to Do It" was written by Bob Dylan in 1968 and was little known until George Harrison's version was first released in March 1985. The song marked the first new release from Harrison in over two years, since his Gone Troppo album in November 1982. Harrison recorded the song in Los Angeles in November 1984, with producer Dave Edmunds, who was overseeing musical contributions from a number of different artists for the Porky's Revenge! soundtrack.

The film soundtrack, featuring Harrison's version of "I Don't Want to Do It", was then released the following year on March 14, 1985. The album was issued on Columbia Records in America on March 14, with a British release following on July 1. The single was issued on April 22 by Columbia, with Edmunds' "Queen of the Hop" as the B-side. The single version is distinguished by a guitar solo in the middle, while the mix chosen for the film instead features an organ solo from Chuck Leavell.

A demo of the song, recorded before the main sessions for Harrison's 1970 triple album All Things Must Pass, can be found on bootlegs such as Beware of ABKCO! and 12 Arnold Grove. This early version had remained officially unreleased until its inclusion on the 50th Anniversary box set of “All Things Must Pass” on 6 August 2021.

In 2009, the Porky's Revenge version of the song was remastered by Giles Martin and Dave Edmunds for inclusion on the compilation album Let It Roll: Songs by George Harrison.

== Reception ==
Cash Box described the single as a "fairly traditional early rock arrangement of this recently uncovered Bob Dylan gem."
