= Circles (George Harrison song) =

- Face label for song's appearance as B-side of 1983 US single

Song by George Harrison

from the album Gone Troppo
- Released: 5 November 1982
- Genre: Hindustani blues
- Length: 3:46
- Label: Dark Horse
- Songwriter: George Harrison
- Producers: George Harrison, Ray Cooper, Phil McDonald

Gone Troppo track listing
- 10 tracks Side one: 1. "Wake Up My Love"; 2. "That's the Way It Goes"; 3. "I Really Love You"; 4. "Greece"; 5. "Gone Troppo"; Side two: 6. "Mystical One"; 7. "Unknown Delight"; 8. "Baby Don't Run Away"; 9. "Dream Away"; 10. "Circles"

"Circles" is a song by the English rock musician George Harrison, released as the final track of his 1982 album Gone Troppo. Harrison wrote the song in India in 1968 while he and the Beatles were studying Transcendental Meditation with Maharishi Mahesh Yogi. The theme of the lyrics is reincarnation. The composition reflects the cyclical aspect of human existence as, according to Hindu doctrine, the soul continues to pass from one life to the next. Although the Beatles never formally recorded it, "Circles" was among the demos the group made at Harrison's Esher home, Kinfauns, in May 1968, while considering material for their double album The Beatles.

Harrison revisited "Circles" during the sessions for his 1979 album George Harrison before he finally recorded it for Gone Troppo. Over this period, Harrison had softened the spiritual message in his work and had also begun to forgo the music business for a career as a film producer with his company HandMade Films. The song was produced by Harrison, Ray Cooper and former Beatles engineer Phil McDonald, with recording taking place at Harrison's Friar Park studio between May and August 1982. The track features extensive use of keyboards and synthesizer, with Billy Preston, Jon Lord and Mike Moran among the contributing musicians.

A slow, meditative song, "Circles" has received a varied response from reviewers. While some find it overly gloomy, others recognise the track as a highlight of a generally overlooked album. In the United States, it was issued as the B-side of the album's second single, "I Really Love You", in February 1983. As the closing track on Gone Troppo, "Circles" was the last song heard on a new Harrison album until 1987, when he returned with Cloud Nine. In November 2018, the Esher demo of "Circles" was officially released on the 50th anniversary edition of The Beatles.

== Background and inspiration ==
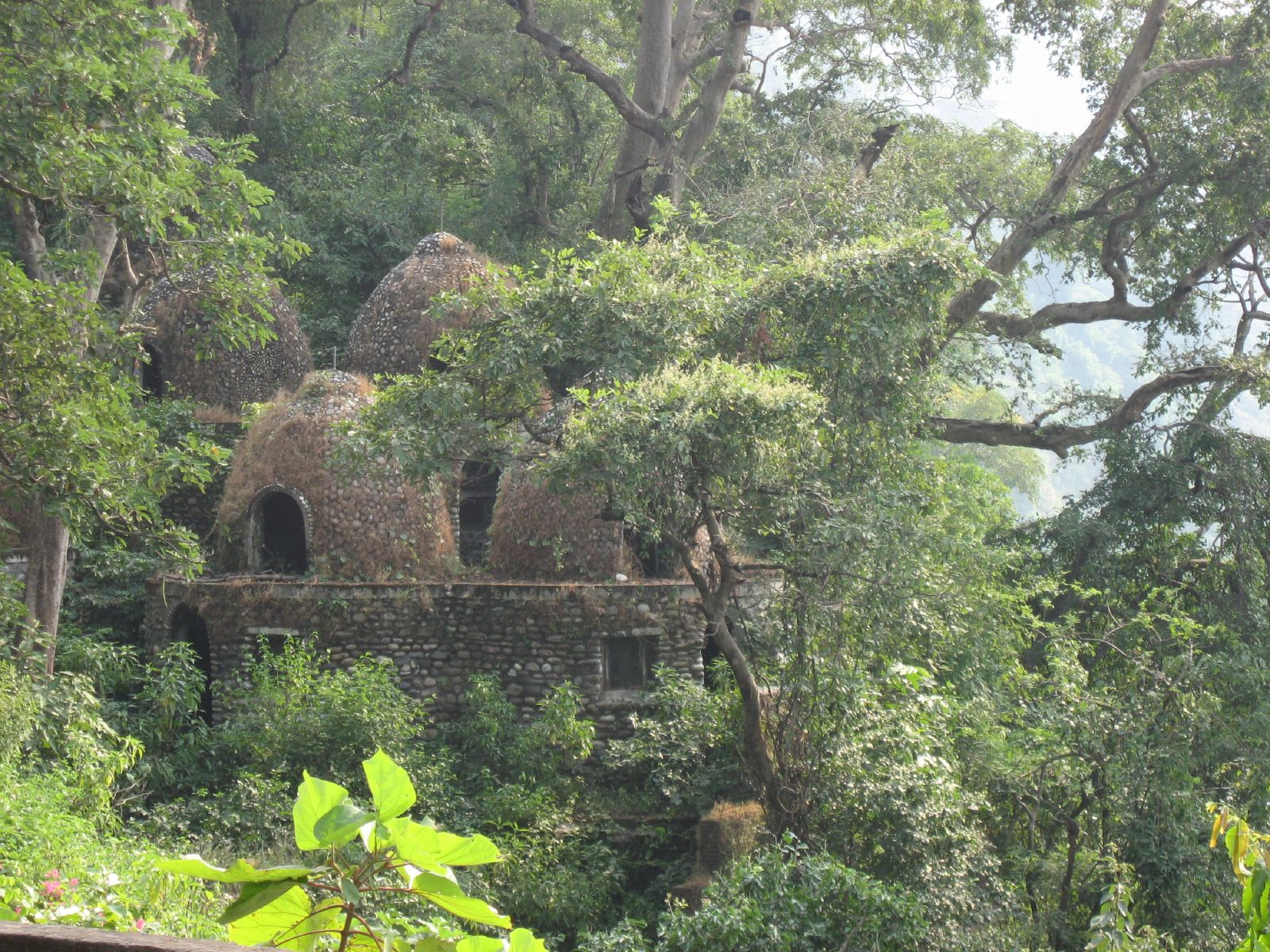
Meditation caves at Maharishi Mahesh Yogi's former ashram in Rishikesh, where Harrison wrote the song

"Circles" was one of several songs that George Harrison wrote in Rishikesh, India, when he and his Beatles bandmates were attending Maharishi Mahesh Yogi's Transcendental Meditation course in the spring of 1968. Aside from providing an opportunity to progress with meditation, the two-month stay marked the start of Harrison's return to the guitar after two years of studying the Indian sitar, partly under the tutelage of Ravi Shankar. During those years, according to Harrison, he only played guitar while working with the Beatles. (Note: Harrison continued to study the sitar through much of 1968. Having begun to question his commitment while filming his scenes for the Shankar documentary Raga in California, in June, he finally abandoned the instrument later that year.) Harrison biographer Simon Leng considers that "Circles" was composed on an organ, however, as most of Harrison's Indian-inspired melodies since 1966 had been – among them, "Within You Without You", "Blue Jay Way" and parts of his Wonderwall Music soundtrack album. Leng writes of "fugue-like keyboard parts" on the song and "bass figures" that partly recall the works of Johann Sebastian Bach.

The song's lyrical theme is reincarnation, in keeping with Harrison's immersion in Hindu philosophy. This preoccupation had led the Beatles to the Maharishi's teachings and soon resulted in Harrison's introduction to the Hare Krishna movement in December 1968. Theologian Dale Allison highlights "Circles" as the only Harrison song to use the term "reincarnate", and he also comments on the composer's use of the word "soul" "in its proper metaphysical sense". (Note: Harrison had first taken reincarnation as his theme for "Art of Dying", which he began writing in 1966. It continued to be the focus of many of his songs as a solo artist, notably the 1973 hit "Give Me Love (Give Me Peace on Earth)".) Harrison also quotes from the Chinese philosopher and author Lao-Tse, whose work Tao Te Ching inspired his 1968 composition "The Inner Light", which was released as the B-side of the Beatles' "Lady Madonna" single while the band were away in Rishikesh. (Note: Harrison was encouraged to adapt Lao-Tse's text into "The Inner Light" by Juan Mascaró, a Sanskrit scholar who had translated part of the Tao Te Ching and other religious writings in his book Lamps of Fire. Mascaró was impressed by the message of "Within You Without You" and, in October 1967, took part in a televised debate about Transcendental Meditation with Harrison and John Lennon.) The lyrics to "Circles" were incomplete when Harrison first taped a demo of the song. He added further verses before making the official recording, as a solo artist, in 1982.

== Composition ==
According to musicologist Walter Everett, the musical aspects of the 1968 version of "Circles" include a "singularly expressive common-tone modulation" over a semitone descent from the chord of C minor to B minor. Harrison changed the key for the official recording, where the song is played in the key of F major. In this final form, the structure comprises two verses and a chorus (or "bridge", as Harrison terms it on his handwritten manuscript); a repeat of this combination, with an instrumental passage over the second section of verse; and two further verses, followed by an extended instrumental passage.

The composition is based on a six-bar chord pattern that produces a circuitous effect due to the lack of resolution at the end of the sequence. Leng views the "chromatic melodic web" of "Circles" as appropriate for conveying the "repetition and entrapment" of reincarnation, as the soul passes through one human life to another. He says that the melody "yearn[s] for resolution in E minor … revolving in dissonance like a lost soul awaiting its place in the reincarnation checkout line". (Note: In another comment on the song's unusual harmonic qualities, Leng writes that "Very few songwriters would conceive a D minor–B-flat–B minor [chord] progression" as Harrison employs over the line "I go round in circles", at the end of the choruses.) Author Ian Inglis writes that, musically and lyrically, "Circles" "displays a direct connection with the unspoken psychedelia" of Harrison's Beatles tracks "Blue Jay Way" and "Long, Long, Long".

Allison describes the lyrics as "a clear statement of reincarnation", as well as "the most blatant example" of Harrison's desire to pass on to a "'higher' and better world" at death, and so escape the cycle of rebirth in the material world. The choruses include the lines from Lao-Tse: "He who knows does not speak / He who speaks does not know". Elsewhere in "Circles", Harrison contemplates the changing nature of friendship as, over the course of lifetimes, in Inglis's description, "our enemies become our companions, affections turn into hatred".

On the released recording, Harrison concludes with a statement on how to break the circle of repetition: "When loss and gain and up and down / Becomes the same, then we stop going in circles." Allison interprets this conclusion, and Harrison's worldview generally, as espousing the need to recognise the illusory nature of the material world, saying: "All the multiplicity and diversity are in truth manifestations of the one hidden and divine reality … opposites are not opposites. To understand that up is down and that gain is loss is to be … on one's way to escaping from the material world."

== The Beatles' demo ==
"Circles"

Demo by the Beatles

from the album The Beatles: 50th Anniversary Edition
- Released: 9 November 2018
- Recorded: May 1968
- Studio: Kinfauns, Esher
- Genre: Folk rock, acoustic
- Length: 2:16
- Songwriter: George Harrison

"Circles" was one of the five Harrison compositions, out of a total of 23 songs, that the Beatles demoed before recording their 1968 double album, The Beatles. The song was taped in late May 1968 at Kinfauns, Harrison's home in Esher, using his Ampex four-track recorder. Harrison sang and played organ on the track, taping two parts on the instrument. The use of keyboards contrasted with the mainly acoustic guitar backing employed on the Beatles' Esher demos; author and critic Richie Unterberger describes the keyboard sound as "an eerie organ that seems to have been dragged out of a dusty, disused church closet". In his book Revolution in the Head, Ian MacDonald identifies the instrument as a harmonium and writes that, rather than performing the song alone, Harrison was "shadowed by a tentative … bass-line" from Paul McCartney.

As with "Sour Milk Sea", another Harrison song inspired by the Beatles' stay in Rishikesh, the group did not attempt to record "Circles" for the White Album. This partly reflected Harrison's junior position to John Lennon and McCartney as a songwriter in the Beatles; in an interview conducted later in 1968, he also stated that he was enjoying contributing more on guitar again and being a "rock 'n' roll star". With the band's songwriting output at an unprecedentedly high level, Harrison's "Not Guilty" was similarly left off the album, even though the group completed a studio recording of that track in London.

The demo of "Circles", along with the Esher recordings of "Sour Milk Sea" and "Not Guilty", began circulating on bootleg compilations in the early 1990s. (Note: The first of these bootlegs was Unsurpassed Demos, issued in 1991. "Circles" then appeared with improved sound on From Kinfauns to Chaos.) In 2018, all the Esher demos were issued on the 50th Anniversary box-set release of The Beatles.

== Recording ==
In 1978, Harrison returned to "Circles" and "Not Guilty" during the sessions for his sixth post-Beatles solo album, George Harrison. Although "Not Guilty" appeared on that release the following year, "Circles" remained unused until 1982, when Harrison again revisited it while working on Gone Troppo. By this point in his career, Harrison had long softened the spiritual message of his work and, since the late 1970s, he had distanced himself from the Hare Krishna movement. Harrison nevertheless gave an in-depth interview to senior devotee Mukunda Goswami in September 1982, during which he shared his thoughts on reincarnation, meditation and chanting.

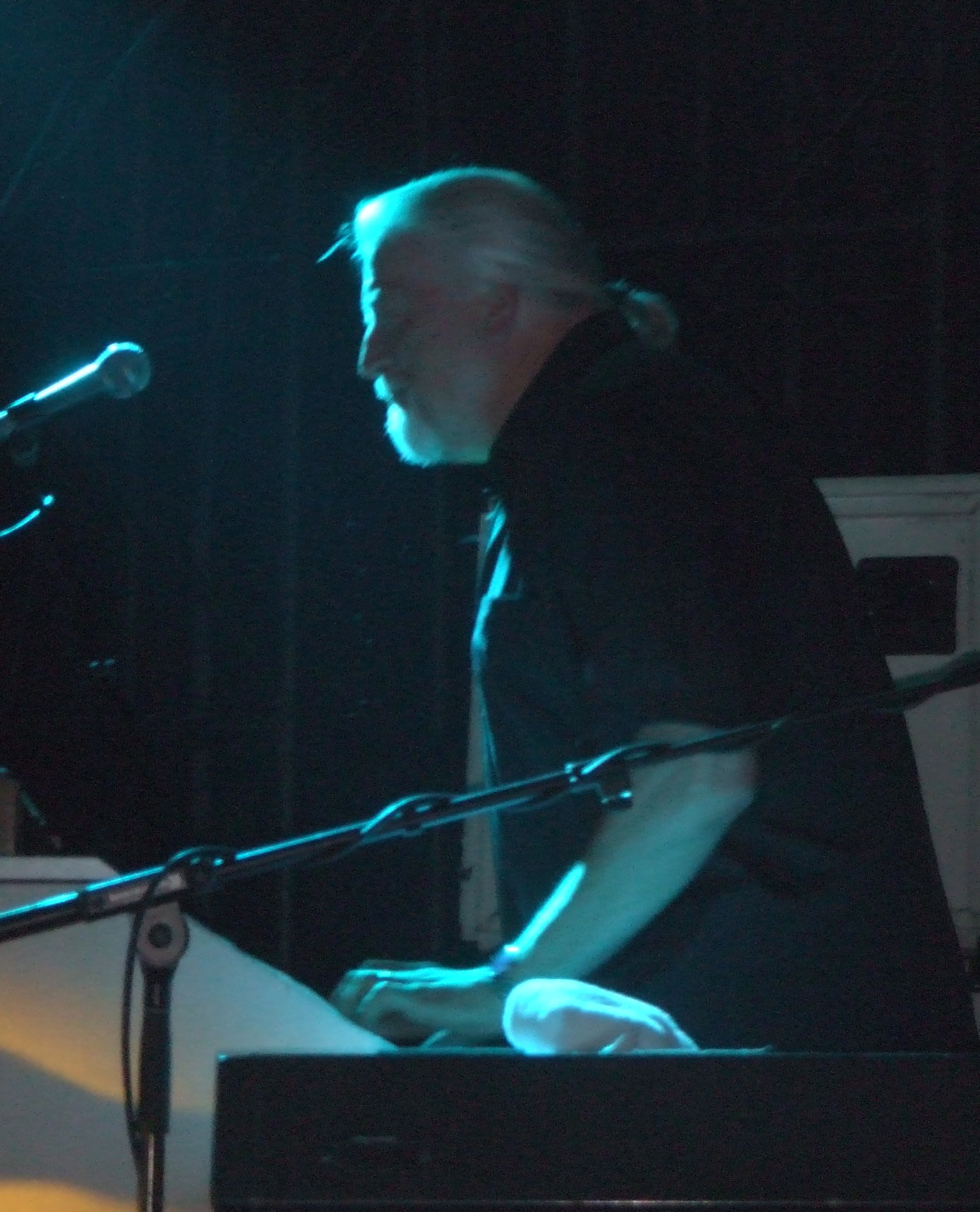
Jon Lord, Harrison's near-neighbour in South Oxfordshire, played one of the keyboard parts on "Circles".

Harrison recorded "Circles" at his Friar Park studio, in Henley-on-Thames, Oxfordshire, during sessions held between 5 May and 27 August 1982. He co-produced the track with Ray Cooper and former Beatles engineer Phil McDonald. The backing musicians included keyboard players Billy Preston, Jon Lord and Mike Moran; Harrison also played synthesizer, in addition to bass and slide guitar. Leng describes the song as Harrison's "first Hindustani blues" and, unlike the sparse 1968 recording, a track arranged with "rich instrumentation" that includes "gospel flourishes" from Preston, on piano and Hammond organ, and "Harrison's unique guitar tones". In musicologist Thomas MacFarlane's view, the layers of keyboards and slide guitar combine with the composition's suspensions and chromatic shifts to produce a "curious hybrid" combining a "Harrison pop tune" with an art song.

Leng comments on the seemingly unlikely pairing of Harrison and Lord, who was the keyboardist for the heavy rock bands Deep Purple and Whitesnake. Acknowledging the close friendship between the two near-neighbours, Leng cites Lord's presence on the track as indicative of a preference for locally sourced contributors and "trusted pals" when Harrison made Gone Troppo. (Note: Lord lived in Goring-on-Thames, some 10 miles west of Henley. Along with Joe Brown, Alvin Lee, Mick Ralphs, Jim Capaldi and Deep Purple drummer Ian Paice, he was part of Harrison's coterie of local musicians known as "the Henley Music Mafia".) As another factor in the album's creation, Harrison felt increasingly removed from contemporary musical trends and more involved with his film company, HandMade, whose recent successes included Terry Gilliam's 1981 fantasy adventure Time Bandits. While viewing "Circles" as "a throwback to the early days of enlightenment in the 1960s", Leng writes that the "ponderous, stuttering, meditative pace and bizarre, circular melodic structure" of the song evokes "the feeling of being transported to one of the parallel realities" depicted in Gilliam's film.

== Release ==
"Circles" was issued on 5 November 1982 as the closing track on Gone Troppo, sequenced after Harrison's song from the Time Bandits soundtrack, "Dream Away". By this point, "Circles" had gained a degree of notoriety, as a title that frequently appeared on lists of the Beatles' unreleased compositions. The album's arrival coincided with heavy marketing of the Beatles' past work and a new television documentary, as part of the twentieth anniversary celebrations of the band's debut single, "Love Me Do". Writing in Mojo in 2011, John Harris described "Circles" as "one bit of Fabs-related intrigue" on a release that otherwise received little notice, due to Harrison's refusal to promote his "contract-finisher" with Warner Bros. Records, the distributor of his Dark Horse record label. Author Alan Clayson comments that the song's "sense of once more going through the old routine" seemingly reflected the artist's disenchantment after Warner's had rejected part of the content of his previous album, Somewhere in England. (Note: Leng writes that, in the context of its 1982 release, "Circles" appeared to be "payback for Somewhere in England", suggesting that Harrison was "challenging" Warner Bros. "to achieve the impossible and market a song about reincarnation".)

Gone Troppo became Harrison's last album for five years, during which he continued to focus on film production, while occasionally contributing to film soundtracks. Among these projects, the 1985 HandMade comedy Water reunited four of the musicians who played on "Circles", as Moran wrote part of the film score (with Harrison), and Harrison, Lord, Moran and Cooper made a cameo appearance as "the Singing Rebels Band", along with Eric Clapton and Ringo Starr. (Note: As another comparatively rare musical activity for Harrison, he joined Lord on stage in Sydney in December 1984 during Deep Purple's reunion tour.) In February 1983, "Circles" was released as the B-side to the album's second single in the United States, "I Really Love You".

== Critical reception ==
Discussing the reception to Gone Troppo in their book Eight Arms to Hold You, Chip Madinger and Mark Easter identify "Circles" as the only track "reflecting weightier matters" on what was otherwise Harrison's "frothiest" collection of songs to date, and they conclude: "Sadly, a decent album was lost in the shuffle of the rapidly changing marketplace of the early '80's." In his contemporary review for Musician magazine, Roy Trakin wrote that, following Lennon's murder two years before, Harrison's "tortured honesty" undermined the album's "attempt to heal those psychic wounds with calm, offhanded music". He said that "not even Billy Preston can rescue … the maudlin tautologies of the closing 'Circles'."

More impressed with Gone Troppo, Dave Thompson wrote in Goldmine in 2002 that, together with "Dream Away", "Circles" "stand[s] alongside any number of Harrison's minor classics". Writing in 2017, Jamie Atkins of Record Collector also challenged the poor reputation that the album had gained. Among its highlights, he said that "Circles turns the creepy, bad acid vibes of [Harrison's] 1968 demo into one of his finest solo tracks."

In his book The Unreleased Beatles, Richie Unterberger describes the song as "a pretty neat, if droning, reflection of Harrison's more somber spiritual sensibilities". He views the 1968 demo as a version that "exerts by far the greater fascination" compared with Harrison's later recording. Author John Winn dismisses "Circles" as "a depressing number that makes 'Blue Jay Way' sound like a Little Richard freakout", while Ian MacDonald describes it as "a typically perceptive, if deeply gloomy, song about karma". Harrison biographer Elliot Huntley dismisses the 1982 version as Harrison's "worst-ever composition", adding: "A heavy, spiritual dirge, somehow redolent of 'Blue Jay Way,' but different inasmuch as it's nowhere near as good … you can almost hear the song-writing barrel being scraped."

By contrast, Simon Leng admires "Circles" as "one of [its] composer's most complex pieces", and he pairs the song with "Beware of Darkness" as "a study in Harrison's unique harmonic sense". In light of its release as the final track on Gone Troppo, Leng adds: "'Circles' was so personal and eccentric that it seemed to close the book on George's recording career. It felt like he was making music only for himself." Thomas MacFarlane considers it to be one of Harrison's "most intriguing works" and a suitable conclusion to the "first phase" of his career as a solo artist. He describes the performances on the track as "startling", saying that they approach a jazz-like virtuosity, and he recognises the production as unique in Harrison's catalogue in its blending of his best signature textural effects with a "minimalistic approach" to soundscape.

== Personnel ==
According to the Gone Troppo CD credits and Simon Leng:

- George Harrison – vocals, bass, synthesizer, slide guitars, backing vocals
- Billy Preston – organ, piano
- Mike Moran – synthesizer
- Jon Lord – synthesizer
- Henry Spinetti – drums
- Ray Cooper – percussion

Beatles version

- George Harrison – vocals, organ

== Sources ==
- Dale C. Allison Jr, The Love There That's Sleeping: The Art and Spirituality of George Harrison, Continuum (New York, NY, 2006; ISBN 978-0-8264-1917-0).
- Keith Badman, The Beatles Diary Volume 2: After the Break-Up 1970–2001, Omnibus Press (London, 2001; ISBN 0-7119-8307-0).
- Chant and Be Happy: The Power of Mantra Meditation, Bhaktivedanta Book Trust (Los Angeles, CA, 1992; ISBN 978-0-89213-118-1).
- Alan Clayson, George Harrison, Sanctuary (London, 2003; ISBN 1-86074-489-3).
- Peter Doggett, You Never Give Me Your Money: The Beatles After the Breakup, It Books (New York, NY, 2011; ISBN 978-0-06-177418-8).
- The Editors of Rolling Stone, Harrison, Rolling Stone Press/Simon & Schuster (New York, NY, 2002; ISBN 0-7432-3581-9).
- Walter Everett, The Beatles as Musicians: Revolver Through the Anthology, Oxford University Press (New York, NY, 1999; ISBN 0-19-509553-7).
- George Harrison (with Derek Taylor & Olivia Harrison), I, Me, Mine – The Extended Edition, Genesis Publications (Guildford, UK, 2017; ISBN 978-1-905662-40-1).
- Mark Hertsgaard, A Day in the Life: The Music and Artistry of the Beatles, Pan Books (London, 1996; ISBN 0-330-33891-9).
- Elliot J. Huntley, Mystical One: George Harrison – After the Break-up of the Beatles, Guernica Editions (Toronto, ON, 2006; ISBN 1-55071-197-0).
- Ian Inglis, The Words and Music of George Harrison, Praeger (Santa Barbara, CA, 2010; ISBN 978-0-313-37532-3).
- Ashley Kahn (ed.), George Harrison on George Harrison: Interviews and Encounters, Chicago Review Press (Chicago, IL, 2020; ISBN 978-1-64160-051-4).
- Peter Lavezzoli, The Dawn of Indian Music in the West, Continuum (New York, NY, 2006; ISBN 0-8264-2819-3).
- Simon Leng, While My Guitar Gently Weeps: The Music of George Harrison, Hal Leonard (Milwaukee, WI, 2006; ISBN 1-4234-0609-5).
- Ian MacDonald, Revolution in the Head: The Beatles' Records and the Sixties, Pimlico (London, 1998; ISBN 0-7126-6697-4).
- Thomas MacFarlane, The Music of George Harrison, Routledge (Abingdon, UK, 2019; ISBN 978-1-138-59910-9).
- Chip Madinger & Mark Easter, Eight Arms to Hold You: The Solo Beatles Compendium, 44.1 Productions (Chesterfield, MO, 2000; ISBN 0-615-11724-4).
- Barry Miles, The Beatles Diary Volume 1: The Beatles Years, Omnibus Press (London, 2001; ISBN 0-7119-8308-9).
- Mark Paytress, "A Passage to India", in Mojo Special Limited Edition: 1000 Days of Revolution (The Beatles' Final Years – Jan 1, 1968 to Sept 27, 1970), Emap (London, 2003), pp. 10–17.
- David Quantick, Revolution: The Making of the Beatles' White Album, A Cappella Books (Chicago, IL, 2002; ISBN 1-55652-470-6).
- Patricia Romanowski & Holly George-Warren (eds), The New Rolling Stone Encyclopedia of Rock & Roll, Fireside/Rolling Stone Press (New York, NY, 1995; ISBN 0-684-81044-1).
- Stuart Shea & Robert Rodriguez, Fab Four FAQ: Everything Left to Know About the Beatles … and More!, Hal Leonard (New York, NY, 2007; ISBN 978-1-4234-2138-2).
- Gary Tillery, Working Class Mystic: A Spiritual Biography of George Harrison, Quest Books (Wheaton, IL, 2011; ISBN 978-0-8356-0900-5).
- Richie Unterberger, The Unreleased Beatles: Music & Film, Backbeat Books (San Francisco, CA, 2006; ISBN 978-0-8793-0892-6).
- John C. Winn, That Magic Feeling: The Beatles' Recorded Legacy, Volume Two, 1966–1970, Three Rivers Press (New York, NY, 2009; ISBN 978-0-3074-5239-9).
- Kenneth Womack, The Beatles Encyclopedia: Everything Fab Four, ABC-CLIO (Santa Barbara, CA, 2014; ISBN 978-0-3133-9171-2).
