= Best of Dark Horse 1976–1989 =

Greatest hits album by George Harrison
- Released: 17 October 1989
- Recorded: May 1976 – July 1989
- Genre: Rock
- Length: 60:26
- Label: Dark Horse
- Producer: George Harrison; Tom Scott; Russ Titelman; Ray Cooper; Phil McDonald; Jeff Lynne

George Harrison chronology
Cloud Nine (1987)	Best of Dark Horse 1976–1989 (1989)	Live in Japan (1992)

Best of Dark Horse 1976–1989 is a compilation album by the English musician George Harrison, released in October 1989. His second compilation album, after the Capitol/EMI collection The Best of George Harrison (1976), it contains songs from Harrison's releases on his Dark Horse record label between 1976 and 1987. The album also includes the 1989 single "Cheer Down", Harrison's contribution to the soundtrack of the film Lethal Weapon 2, and two tracks recorded specifically for the compilation: "Poor Little Girl" and "Cockamamie Business". Despite the popularity of Harrison's work during this period – both as a solo artist with Cloud Nine (1987) and as a member of the Traveling Wilburys – the compilation failed to achieve commercial success.

Best of Dark Horse went out of print in the early 1990s and remained unavailable when Harrison's Dark Horse catalogue was reissued in 2004. It remains the only official release to include "Poor Little Girl" and "Cockamamie Business".

== Background ==
Rather than record a follow-up to his successful 1987 comeback album, Cloud Nine, in 1989, George Harrison chose to wait for his Traveling Wilburys bandmates – Jeff Lynne, Bob Dylan and Tom Petty – to become available to start work on a new album. As the de facto leader of the Wilburys project, Harrison was the most active member in promoting their 1988 debut, Traveling Wilburys Vol. 1. In a July 1989 interview, he described the album as "one of the most enjoyable things I've done" and added: "I just have to wait for all the other Wilburys to finish being solo artists …" Harrison instead agreed to issue a greatest hits album, covering his work released on his own Dark Horse record label, from 1976's Thirty Three & 1/3 to Cloud Nine.

== Album content ==
=== Previously released songs ===
Unlike on The Best of George Harrison (1976), which Capitol Records had compiled after the expiration of his EMI contract, Harrison was involved in the selection of songs for Best of Dark Horse. The compilation includes his hit singles "Crackerbox Palace" (1977), "Blow Away" (1979), "All Those Years Ago" (1981), "Got My Mind Set on You" (1987) and "When We Was Fab" (1988), and two other songs that had placed on one of Billboard magazine's US singles charts: "Love Comes to Everyone" (1979) and "Wake Up My Love" (1982). The new album omitted charting singles such as "This Song" (1976) and "This Is Love" (1988), however. Over these, Harrison favoured a selection of album tracks: "Here Comes the Moon", from 1979's George Harrison album; "Life Itself", from Somewhere in England (1981); "That's the Way It Goes" and "Gone Troppo", from the 1982 album Gone Troppo; and the title track from Cloud Nine, which had charted on Billboard's Album Rock Tracks listings.

=== New recordings ===
Harrison recorded two new songs for the compilation – "Poor Little Girl" and "Cockamamie Business" – at his Friar Park home studio in July 1989. Also included on Best of Dark Horse 1976–1989 was Harrison's contribution to the soundtrack for the film Lethal Weapon 2, "Cheer Down", which was issued as a single in the United States in August 1989. The latter song was co-written by Petty and co-produced by Lynne. Although Lynne played on "Poor Little Girl" and "Cockamamie Business" also, and the recordings feature a similar sound to his and Harrison's previous collaborations, production for the two songs was credited to Harrison only. While preparing the compilation for release, Harrison contributed various guitar parts to Lynne's debut solo album, Armchair Theatre.

== Release ==
Professional ratings
Review scores
Source	Rating
AllMusic	4.5/5 stars
Blender	4/5 stars
Christgau's Record Guide	B−
Encyclopedia of Popular Music	3/5 stars
The Essential Rock Discography	7/10
Goldmine	"Recommended"
MusicHound	3/5
Q	3/5 stars
Uncut	4/5 stars

Best of Dark Horse 1976–1989 was released on 17 October 1989 in the United States and 23 October in Britain. The album cover features a photograph of Harrison taken by Terry O'Neill. Harrison dedicated the album to Friends of the Earth, Greenpeace, Parents for Safe Food, the Traveling Wilburys, racing-car designer Gordon Murray, and "anyone interested in saving our planet".

For the UK release of the "Cheer Down" single, which took place on 27 November, "Poor Little Girl" appeared as the B-side. "Poor Little Girl" was issued as a promotional single in the US, containing both the full (4:32) version of the track and a 3:25 edit. The song peaked at number 21 on the national Album Rock Tracks chart.

On release, Best of Dark Horse 1976–1989 failed to chart in the United Kingdom and peaked at number 132 in the United States. The album's lack of commercial success was surprising, given the resurgence in popularity that Harrison had experienced since 1987. Originally distributed through Warner Bros. Records, the compilation went out of print some years later and was not reissued by EMI when that company began distributing Harrison's Dark Horse catalogue. "Poor Little Girl", "Cockamamie Business" and "Cheer Down" were omitted from Harrison's 2004 box set The Dark Horse Years 1976–1992.

Reviewing the album in Christgau's Record Guide: The '80s (1990), Robert Christgau called Harrison "a simpleton, but also a genuine weirdo" whose voice can imitate wah-wah sounds as well as Robert Plant emulates the guitar of Jimmy Page. Christgau added: "And he seems genuinely troubled by evil doings here on the wrong side of the veil of maya, not that there's anything a mere star-in-spite-of-himself can do about it, except write the occasional ditty about playing in a rock and roll band." Writing for Rough Guides in 2006, Chris Ingham described Best of Dark Horse as "excellent" and regretted that the album was no longer available. With The Best of George Harrison the artist's only compilation in print at that time, and "hardly a satisfying one-stop sampler", Ingham continued, "This state of affairs surely can't last much longer." In a 2018 review for Uncut, Peter Watts said that while the 1976–89 period is not widely considered to be the artist's most productive period, "It's a testament to Harrison's talent that he could put together such a strong selection of songs ... and that's without including a couple of charting singles ('This Song', 'This Is Love') or anything by the Traveling Wilburys. Even today, it's the only place you can hear 'Poor Little Girl' and 'Cockamamie Business', making it essential for completists."

== Track listing ==
All tracks are written by George Harrison, except where noted.

No.	Title	Writer(s)	Original album	Length
1.	"Poor Little Girl"		previously unreleased	4:33
2.	"Blow Away"		George Harrison	3:59
3.	"That's the Way It Goes"		Gone Troppo	3:34
4.	"Cockamamie Business"		previously unreleased	5:15
5.	"Wake Up My Love"		Gone Troppo	3:32
6.	"Life Itself"		Somewhere in England	4:24
7.	"Got My Mind Set on You"	Rudy Clark	Cloud Nine	3:52
8.	"Crackerbox Palace"		Thirty Three & 1/3	3:56
9.	"Cloud 9"		Cloud Nine	3:14
10.	"Here Comes the Moon" (Edit)		George Harrison	4:09
11.	"Gone Troppo"		Gone Troppo	4:23
12.	"When We Was Fab"	Harrison, Jeff Lynne	Cloud Nine	3:56
13.	"Love Comes to Everyone" (Single Edit)		George Harrison	3:40
14.	"All Those Years Ago"		Somewhere in England	3:44
15.	"Cheer Down"	Harrison, Tom Petty	Lethal Weapon 2 soundtrack	4:08

The vinyl release omitted "Gone Troppo" and reversed the order of "Crackerbox Palace" and "Cloud 9". "Got My Mind Set on You" closed side one and "Cloud 9" opened side two. The cassette release matched the fifteen-song CD track listing. In this format, "Crackerbox Palace" closed side one and "Cloud 9" opened side two.

== Personnel ==
Musicians on new recordings ("Poor Little Girl" and "Cockamamie Business")

According to Simon Leng:

- George Harrison – vocals, guitars, banjo, backing vocals
- Jeff Lynne – bass, keyboards, backing vocals
- Richard Tandy – piano
- Ray Cooper – percussion
- Ian Paice – drums
- Jim Horn – saxophones, horn arrangements

Technical personnel

Adapted from the credits in the Best of Dark Horse CD booklet:

- Phil McDonald – recording and remix engineering
- Richard Dodd – compilation engineering
- Wherefore Art? – art design
- Terry O'Neill – photography

== Chart positions ==
Chart (1989)	Peak position
Japanese Oricon Weekly Albums Chart	51
US Billboard 200	132

== Sales ==
Country	Provider	Sales
Japan	Oricon	6,820+

== Sources ==
- Badman, Keith (2001). The Beatles Diary Volume 2: After the Break-Up 1970–2001. London: Omnibus Press. ISBN 978-0-7119-8307-6.
- Clayson, Alan (2003). George Harrison. London: Sanctuary. ISBN 1-86074-489-3.
- The Editors of Rolling Stone (2002). Harrison. New York, NY: Rolling Stone Press. ISBN 978-0-7432-3581-5.
- Graff, Gary; Durchholz, Daniel, eds. (1999). MusicHound Rock: The Essential Album Guide. Farmington Hills, MI: Visible Ink Press. ISBN 1-57859-061-2.
- Harry, Bill (2003). The George Harrison Encyclopedia. London: Virgin Books. ISBN 978-0-7535-0822-0.
- Huntley, Elliot J. (2006). Mystical One: George Harrison – After the Break-up of the Beatles. Toronto, ON: Guernica Editions. ISBN 1-55071-197-0.
- Ingham, Chris (2006). The Rough Guide to the Beatles (2nd edn). London: Rough Guides/Penguin. ISBN 978-1-84836-525-4.
- Inglis, Ian (2010). The Words and Music of George Harrison. Santa Barbara, CA: Praeger. ISBN 978-0-313-37532-3.
- Larkin, Colin (2006). The Encyclopedia of Popular Music (4th edn). Vol. 4. New York, NY: Oxford University Press. ISBN 0-19-531373-9.
- Leng, Simon (2006). While My Guitar Gently Weeps: The Music of George Harrison. Milwaukee, WI: Hal Leonard. ISBN 978-1-4234-0609-9.
- Madinger, Chip; Easter, Mark (2000). Eight Arms to Hold You: The Solo Beatles Compendium. Chesterfield, MO: 44.1 Productions. ISBN 0-615-11724-4.
- Rodriguez, Robert (2010). Fab Four FAQ 2.0: The Beatles' Solo Years, 1970–1980. Milwaukee, WI: Backbeat Books. ISBN 978-1-4165-9093-4.
- Strong, Martin C. (2006). The Essential Rock Discography. Edinburgh, UK: Canongate. p. 481. ISBN 978-1-84195-827-9.
- Womack, Kenneth (2014). The Beatles Encyclopedia: Everything Fab Four. Santa Barbara, CA: ABC-CLIO. ISBN 978-0-313-39171-2.
