= Beware of ABKCO! =

Studio album (bootleg) by George Harrison
- Released: 1994
- Recorded: 27 May 1970
- Studios: EMI, London
- Genre: Rock
- Length: 52:12
- Label: Strawberry

Beware of ABKCO! is a bootleg album of songs performed by the English rock musician George Harrison in May 1970. It contains songs that were under consideration for Harrison's triple album All Things Must Pass, his first release as a solo artist following the break-up of the Beatles.

== Background ==
The performances were taped in a single session at EMI (later Abbey Road Studios) in London, on 27 May 1970, for the benefit of Harrison's co-producer, Phil Spector. Seven of the fifteen songs were subsequently recorded formally for inclusion on All Things Must Pass, as was "Everybody, Nobody" after Harrison reworked it as "Ballad of Sir Frankie Crisp (Let It Roll)".

From its 1994 release by Strawberry Records, the bootleg provided the only available record of five songs that Harrison never revisited during his career. Among these is a 1968 collaboration with Bob Dylan titled "Nowhere to Go".

The album title derives from Harrison's performance of "Beware of Darkness", where he altered a line to mention Allen Klein's management company ABKCO.

== Recording ==
Harrison recorded the tape that subsequently became the Beware of ABKCO! bootleg at Abbey Road Studios in London, early on in the sessions for All Things Must Pass. By this time, in May 1970, he had amassed a large stockpile of songs since his level of contribution as a songwriter in the Beatles was always limited by the dominance of John Lennon and Paul McCartney. (Note: Harrison had recorded two solo albums during the Beatles' career – Wonderwall Music and Electronic Sound – but All Things Must Pass was his first to consist of songs rather than instrumental pieces.) Harrison ran through a selection of his unused songs for the benefit of Phil Spector, his co-producer on All Things Must Pass, with a view to choosing which ones they would work on for the album.

In his liner notes to the 2001 reissue of All Things Must Pass, Harrison gives the recording date as 27 May. He also writes that he was not aware that his performances were being taped. When promoting the reissue, Harrison recalled that an engineer happened to set up a microphone and record him.

The songs are all solo performances by Harrison, except for bass guitar accompaniment on "Wah-Wah". He plays acoustic guitar on the majority of the tracks, changing to electric guitar for three songs: "Wah-Wah", "Hear Me Lord" and "Nowhere to Go". (Note: Harrison starts playing "Cosmic Empire" on electric guitar but soon changes over to the acoustic instrument.) The performances heighten the folk aspect of Harrison's songwriting and contrast with the large-scale arrangements and Wall of Sound production employed on much of the official album. Harrison gives a brief spoken introduction before several of the songs, during which he occasionally acknowledges when the lyrics are still incomplete.

== Musical content ==
=== Songs officially released by Harrison ===
Seven of the fifteen tracks were subsequently recorded for All Things Must Pass. In addition, soon after performing it on 27 May, Harrison incorporated "Everybody, Nobody" into a new song, "Ballad of Sir Frankie Crisp (Let It Roll)", which he also included on the official release. Two of the remaining tracks were songs that Harrison returned to later in his solo career. "Beautiful Girl" appeared on the 1976 album Thirty Three & 1/3, and the Bob Dylan-written "I Don't Want to Do It" became Harrison's contribution to the soundtrack for Porky's Revenge! in 1985. In the case of the latter song, this was despite Harrison telling Spector on the tape that he intended to record the track at the session the following day.

=== Songs exclusive to the album ===
==== "Window, Window" ====
One of several Harrison compositions presented to the Beatles in January 1969, during the sessions that produced their Let It Be album and film, but rejected by the group. Harrison debuted the song at Apple Studio on 21 January, his first day of work since walking out on the band eleven days before. The group briefly rehearsed it on 26 January, until McCartney took over the singing and ensured it was no longer taken seriously. The song is in the folk style and is introduced by Harrison in his May 1970 performance as being "a bit silly". In his commentary on Beware of ABKCO!, music critic Richie Unterberger describes "Window, Window" as a "lilting, troubadourish ballad".

==== "Nowhere to Go" ====
A second Harrison–Dylan collaboration from November 1968, after "I'd Have You Anytime", which Harrison chose as the opening track of All Things Must Pass. "Nowhere to Go" was originally known as "When Everybody Comes to Town". Harrison recorded a demo of the song at Dylan's house in Greenwich Village in late April 1970. In the lyrics, Harrison comments on his drug bust, in March 1969, and life as a Beatle.

==== "Cosmic Empire" ====
Theologian Dale Allison describes "Cosmic Empire" as a "happy song" that "obviously expresses a religious worldview and sets forth a religious goal" although the lyrics are "cryptic". Unterberger describes it as "buoyant, jaunty" and says that it demonstrates Harrison's sense of humour. At the start of the performance, Harrison announces that he envisions the song "full of chorus voices".

==== "Mother Divine" ====
Olivia Harrison says she came across the lyrics to "Mother Divine" when compiling the 2017 revised edition of her late husband's autobiography, I, Me, Mine, and that they suggest Harrison wrote the song while in India in the late 1960s. The song has a medium tempo and its meaning invites interpretation as being about a woman as well as a deity – a style of songwriting that Harrison introduced in 1968 with "Long, Long, Long" and would return to frequently as a solo artist. (Note: In reply to a fan's question in a 2001 online Q&A, Harrison said: "Well, the lover that we miss is actually God ... I can't separate the two – a beautiful girl is the divine mother, a beautiful man is the manifestation of potential.") It consists of frequent repetition of the chorus; in the first of its two verses, Harrison sings: "Haloed in splendour / Her face, tenderly smiling too / Was beauty itself / And I know that she loves me." Olivia has also said of the song: "It's a lovely sentiment, and something he did sing over the years, maybe as a mantra."

The lyrics may be based on a passage from a chapter in Paramahansa Yogananda's Autobiography of a Yogi where Yogananda describes beholding a vision of God as the Divine Mother, and says: "Haloed in splendor, the Divine Mother stood before me. Her face, tenderly smiling, was beauty itself." Divine Mother spoke to him at that meeting: "Always have I loved thee! Ever shall I love thee!" The experience came to Yogananda, the book says, as a response to him desperately wanting to know if Divine Mother loved him after he had witnessed a saint openly conversing with Her. Harrison was known to be a fan of the book and would give out copies of it to friends.

==== "Tell Me What Has Happened to You" ====
In Unterberger's description, the song contains an "ominous ascending riff" and sections set in a more standard folk style.

== Official releases ==
"Beware of Darkness" and "Let It Down" were included as bonus tracks on the 2001 reissue of All Things Must Pass (with lead guitar and keyboard overdubs added to "Let It Down");

"Run of the Mill" appeared on the 2012 outtakes and demos compilation Early Takes: Volume 1.

All fifteen songs were officially released in August 2021, as part of the Uber and Super deluxe editions of the All Things Must Pass: 50th Anniversary box set.

== Track listing ==
All songs written by George Harrison except where noted otherwise.

1. "Run of the Mill"
2. "Art of Dying"
3. "Everybody, Nobody"
4. "Wah-Wah"
5. "Window, Window"
6. "Beautiful Girl"
7. "Beware of Darkness"
8. "Let It Down"
9. "Tell Me What Has Happened to You"
10. "Hear Me Lord"
11. "Nowhere to Go" (Harrison, Bob Dylan)
12. "Cosmic Empire"
13. "Mother Divine"
14. "I Don't Want to Do It" (Dylan)
15. "If Not for You" (Dylan)

== Personnel ==
According to authors Chip Madinger and Mark Easter:

- George Harrison – vocals, acoustic guitar (tracks 1–3, 5–9, 12–15), electric guitar (4, 10–11), dialogue
- unnamed session musician – bass guitar (4)

== Sources ==
- Allison, Dale C. Jr. (2006). The Love There That's Sleeping: The Art and Spirituality of George Harrison. New York, NY: Continuum. ISBN 978-0-8264-1917-0.
- Badman, Keith (2001). The Beatles Diary Volume 2: After the Break-Up 1970–2001. London: Omnibus Press. ISBN 978-0-7119-8307-6.
- Harrison, George (with Derek Taylor; Olivia Harrison) (2017). I, Me, Mine – The Extended Edition. Guildford, UK: Genesis Publications. ISBN 978-1-905662-40-1.
- Huntley, Elliot J. (2006). Mystical One: George Harrison – After the Break-up of the Beatles. Toronto, ON: Guernica Editions. ISBN 1-55071-197-0.
- Inglis, Ian (2010). The Words and Music of George Harrison. Santa Barbara, CA: Praeger. ISBN 978-0-313-37532-3.
- Kahn, Ashley, ed. (2020). George Harrison on George Harrison: Interviews and Encounters. Chicago, IL: Chicago Review Press. ISBN 978-1-64160-051-4.
- Leng, Simon (2006). While My Guitar Gently Weeps: The Music of George Harrison. Milwaukee, WI: Hal Leonard. ISBN 978-1-4234-0609-9.
- Madinger, Chip; Easter, Mark (2000). Eight Arms to Hold You: The Solo Beatles Compendium. Chesterfield, MO: 44.1 Productions. ISBN 0-615-11724-4.
- Schaffner, Nicholas (1978). The Beatles Forever. New York, NY: McGraw-Hill. ISBN 0-07-055087-5.
- Spizer, Bruce (2005). The Beatles Solo on Apple Records. New Orleans, LA: 498 Productions. ISBN 0-9662649-5-9.
- Sulpy, Doug; Schweighardt, Ray (1997). Get Back: The Unauthorized Chronicle of The Beatles' Let It Be Disaster. New York, NY: St. Martin's Griffin. ISBN 0-312-19981-3.
- Unterberger, Richie (2006). The Unreleased Beatles: Music & Film. San Francisco, CA: Backbeat Books. ISBN 978-0-87930-892-6.
- Unterberger, Richie (2014). The Unreleased Beatles: Music & Film (Revised, Expanded & Updated eBook ed.). BookBaby. ISBN 978-0-991589265.
