= Dream Away (George Harrison song) =

- Picture sleeve for the 1983 Japanese single

Song by George Harrison

from the album Gone Troppo
- Released: 5 November 1982
- Studio: FPSHOT (Oxfordshire)
- Genre: Rock; pop
- Length: 4:32
- Label: Dark Horse
- Songwriter: George Harrison
- Producers: George Harrison; Ray Cooper; Phil McDonald

Gone Troppo track listing
- 10 tracks Side one: 1. "Wake Up My Love"; 2. "That's the Way It Goes"; 3. "I Really Love You"; 4. "Greece"; 5. "Gone Troppo"; Side two: 6. "Mystical One"; 7. "Unknown Delight"; 8. "Baby Don't Run Away"; 9. "Dream Away"; 10. "Circles"

"Dream Away" is a song by the English rock musician George Harrison written for the film Time Bandits (1981), and subsequently released on his tenth studio album Gone Troppo (1982). The song is featured over the end credits of Time Bandits, a production of Harrison's HandMade Films directed by Terry Gilliam. "Dream Away" was also issued as a single in Japan in February 1983.

== Background ==
"Dream Away" was to originally appear on a planned Time Bandits soundtrack album. When that failed to materialise and Harrison was finalising the tracks for his Gone Troppo album, he decided to include "Dream Away".

In the documentary film George Harrison: Living in the Material World (2011), directed by Martin Scorsese, Gilliam recalled that late in the production of Time Bandits he came to see the song's lyrics as "notes" from Harrison on the things he liked and disliked about the film and on how Gilliam was "too arrogant and not listening!" Gilliam added: "And I thought it was the most brilliant, subtle, clever thing a man could ever do, to write a song. He's writing about things that he felt strongly about and yet he's too polite and decent and, I think, respectful of other artists, whatever form that takes, to interfere."

== Release and critical reception ==
Although Gone Troppo was a commercial failure, "Dream Away" became a popular tune. People magazine's reviewer paired it with "Wake Up My Love" as the album's two "lovelies" and commented that "Because of his forays into the mystical, Harrison's penchant for whimsy often gets overlooked. But here the zany side gets no short shrift."

Writing in Goldmine magazine shortly after Harrison's death in November 2001, Dave Thompson said that while Gone Troppo was a far from essential album by the artist, "Dream Away" was a track that "stand[s] alongside any number of Harrison's minor classics". In 2010, AOL Radio listeners voted "Dream Away" at number 8 on the station's list of the "10 Best George Harrison Songs".

== Personnel ==
- George Harrison – lead vocals; guitars; backing vocals
- Mike Moran – piano; synthesizer
- Alan Jones – bass
- Dave Mattacks – drums
- Ray Cooper – percussion
- Billy Preston – backing vocals
- Syreeta – backing vocals
- Sara Jones Recor Fleetwood – backing vocals
