= Gone Troppo =

Studio album by George Harrison
- Released: 5 November 1982
- Recorded: 5 May–27 August 1982
- Studio: FPSHOT (Oxfordshire)
- Genres: Pop rock; new wave; synth-pop
- Length: 39:07
- Label: Dark Horse
- Producers: George Harrison; Ray Cooper; Phil McDonald

George Harrison chronology
Somewhere in England (1981)	Gone Troppo (1982)	Cloud Nine (1987)

Singles from Gone Troppo
- 1. "Wake Up My Love" Released: 8 November 1982; 2. "I Really Love You" Released: 9 February 1983 (US); 3. "Dream Away" Released: February 1983 (Japan only)

Gone Troppo is the tenth studio album by English rock musician George Harrison, released on 5 November 1982 by Dark Horse Records. It includes the single "Wake Up My Love" and "Dream Away", which served as the theme song for the 1981 HandMade Films production Time Bandits. Harrison produced the album alongside Ray Cooper and former Beatles engineer Phil McDonald.

With Harrison uninterested in the contemporary music scene and unwilling to promote the release, Gone Troppo failed to chart in the United Kingdom and became his only post-Beatles studio album not to reach the top 20 in the United States. Over the next five years, he largely took an extended hiatus from his music career, with only occasional soundtrack recordings being released.

== Background ==
By the early 1980s, Harrison had been finding the current musical climate alienating. His previous studio album Somewhere in England (1981) had sold fairly well, aided by the John Lennon tribute hit, "All Those Years Ago", but in the United States it was Harrison's first album since the Beatles' break-up that failed to receive gold certification from the Recording Industry Association of America (RIAA). With one album left on his current recording contract, Harrison recorded Gone Troppo in 1982 but refused to promote it or make music videos for the two singles. The title is an Australian slang expression meaning "gone mad or crazy due to tropical heat" or just "gone mad".

== Artwork ==
The album's artwork was credited to "Legs" Larry Smith, formerly of the Bonzo Dog Doo-Dah Band.

== Release ==
Gone Troppo was issued on Dark Horse Records in November 1982. Warner Bros. Records, which distributed Harrison's Dark Horse label, were at a loss as to how to market the album and matched the artist's indifference by failing to promote the release. The album peaked at number 108 in the United States and failed to chart at all in the United Kingdom.

"Wake Up My Love" and "That's the Way It Goes" were included on Harrison's compilation album Best of Dark Horse 1976–1989, and the title track also appeared on the compact disc version of that album. No tracks from Gone Troppo were included on the 2009 career-spanning collection Let It Roll. "That's the Way It Goes" was covered by Joe Brown and other musicians at the Concert for George in November 2002.

In 2004, Gone Troppo was remastered and reissued, both separately from and as part of the deluxe box set The Dark Horse Years 1976–1992. The reissue added a demo version of "Mystical One" as its sole bonus track.

== Critical reception ==
Professional ratings
Review scores
Source	Rating
AllMusic	2/5 stars
The Encyclopedia of Popular Music	1/5 stars
Mojo	2/5 stars
The Music Box	2/5 stars
Rolling Stone (1983)	2/5 stars
Rolling Stone (2004)	3/5 stars
Uncut	3/5 stars

Among contemporary reviews, Billboard said of Gone Troppo: "Harrison's sunny lyricism shines brightest when least encumbered by self-consciousness, and here that equation yields a breezy, deceptively eclectic charmer." People magazine's reviewer wrote: "Because of his forays into the mystical, Harrison's penchant for whimsy often gets overlooked. But here the zany side gets no short shrift." The reviewer admired "lovelies" such as "Wake Up My Love" and "Dream Away", and described Gone Troppo as a "vinyl postcard" offering "flashes of brilliance".

Less impressed, Steve Pond of Rolling Stone said that, of late, Harrison had "made a much better movie financier than musician", and he found the album "So offhand and breezy as to be utterly insubstantial", with "Wake Up My Love" the only song of note. Writing for Musician, Roy Trakin considered that, in the wake of Lennon's assassination two years before, Harrison's "tortured honesty … dooms this record's attempt to heal those psychic wounds with calm, offhanded music". Trakin admired some of the guitar playing on the album but concluded: "It's too bad the public won't forget George Harrison was a Beatle. His musical output will undoubtedly suffer by comparison until we do."

Reviewing more recently for AllMusic, critic William Ruhlmann writes of Gone Troppo: "Clearly, Harrison could no longer treat his musical career as a part-time stepchild to his interests in car racing and movie producing if he wanted to maintain it. As it turned out, he didn't; this was his last album for five years." Writing in the 2004 edition of The Rolling Stone Album Guide, Mac Randall opined: "The dynamic, synth-driven 'Wake Up My Love' opens Gone Troppo and the spooky 'Circles' (yet another lost Beatles song) closes it, but there ain't much in between."

John Harris of Mojo likens Gone Troppo to Harrison's final album for EMI/Capitol, Extra Texture (1975), and dismisses it as "Another contract-finisher, this time with Warner Brothers, recorded super-quick, and issued with barely any promotion." Music Box editor John Metzger also holds it in low regard, writing: "Gone Troppo was undoubtedly the worst of George Harrison's solo albums … A few tunes, such as That's the Way It Goes and Unknown Delight, might have worked better if given different arrangements, but as a whole, Gone Troppo was a largely forgettable and sometimes embarrassing affair that appealed only to complete-ists and fanatics."

More impressed, Dave Thompson wrote in Goldmine magazine of its standing as the release that preceded Harrison's temporary retirement from music: "to accuse the album itself of hastening that demise is grossly unfair." While conceding that it was a far from essential Harrison album, Thompson considered it to be "no worse than much of [Paul] McCartney's period output" and opined that "Dream Away" and "Circles" "stand alongside any number of Harrison's minor classics".

Kit Aiken of Uncut describes Gone Troppo as "a return to form of sorts" after Somewhere in England and a collection of "amiable, light-hearted music made by a bunch of mates with nothing to prove". In another favourable 2004 assessment, for Rolling Stone, Parke Puterbaugh wrote: "Gone Troppo might just be Harrison's most underrated album … [It] captures Harrison at his most relaxed and playful on songs such as the title track."

== Track listing ==
All songs written and composed by George Harrison, except where noted.

Side one

1. "Wake Up My Love" – 3:34
2. "That's the Way It Goes" – 3:34
3. "I Really Love You" (Leroy Swearingen) – 2:54
4. "Greece" – 3:58
5. "Gone Troppo" – 4:25

Side two

1. "Mystical One" – 3:42
2. "Unknown Delight" – 4:16
3. "Baby Don't Run Away" – 4:01
4. "Dream Away" – 4:29
5. "Circles" – 3:46

Bonus track Gone Troppo was remastered and reissued in 2004 with the bonus track:

11. "Mystical One" (demo version) – 6:02

== Personnel ==
- George Harrison – vocals, electric and acoustic guitar, synthesiser, bass (1,10), mandolin, marimba, jal tarang, backing vocals, production
- Ray Cooper – percussion (1-3, 5-10), marimba, glockenspiel (3), electric piano (3), sound effects, production
- Mike Moran – keyboards, synthesiser, piano, synthesiser bass (1-6, 8-10)
- Henry Spinetti – drums (1–6, 10)
- Dave Mattacks – drums (9)
- Herbie Flowers – bass guitar (2-6)
- Alan Jones – bass guitar (9)
- Billy Preston – organ (10), piano (10), keyboards (4), synthesizer (4), backing vocals (8-9)
- Jim Keltner – percussion (5), drums (7-8)
- Joe Brown – mandolin (6), backing vocals (5)
- Russell Powell - acoustic guitar
- Neil Larsen – piano (7)
- Gary Brooker – synthesizer (7)
- Willie Weeks – bass guitar (7)
- Jon Lord – synthesizer (10)
- Willie Greene – backing vocals (3, 7), bass voice (2)
- Bobby King – backing vocals (3, 7)
- Vicki Brown – backing vocals (5)
- Pico Pena – backing vocals (3, 7)
- Syreeta – backing vocals (9)
- Sarah Ricor – backing vocals (9)
- Rodina Sloan – backing vocals (8)
- Phil McDonald – production
- "Legs" Larry Smith – art direction, design

== Chart positions ==
Chart	Peak position
Canadian RPM Albums Chart	98
Norwegian VG-lista Albums Chart	31
US Billboard 200	108
