= Phil McDonald =

English recording engineer and record producer (1946–2026)

- Born: Philip John McDonald; 3 February 1946; Leeds, England
- Died: 25 October 2026 (aged 80); Fort Lauderdale, Florida, U.S.
- Occupation: Audio engineer • record producer

Philip John McDonald (3 February 1946 – 25 October 2026) was an English audio engineer and record producer. He worked at EMI Recording Studios and later at Apple Studios, recording with the Beatles and the group's members during their solo careers. Alongside Geoff Emerick, he won the 1970 Grammy Award for Best Engineered Recording – Non-Classical for the Beatles' album Abbey Road (1969).

== Early life ==
Philip John McDonald was born in Leeds, England, on 3 February 1946. His family moved to Earl's Court, London during the early 1960s.

== Career ==
=== EMI and the Beatles ===
McDonald joined EMI Recording Studios at Abbey Road in 1964, aged 18. He started in the tape library and subsequently spent two years in the disc-cutting department mastering records, before becoming a tape operator and, later, a balance engineer.

In April 1965, McDonald assisted with mono and stereo mixes of the Beatles' song "Help!". He subsequently worked on sessions for "Yesterday" in June 1965 and on the albums Revolver (1966), Sgt. Pepper's Lonely Hearts Club Band (1967) and The Beatles (1968). He became a balance engineer in 1969 and worked on nearly every session for Abbey Road, either independently or alongside Emerick. Emerick later explained that McDonald shared the engineering duties because Emerick was also occupied with the development of the Beatles' new recording studio at Apple.

=== Solo recordings and Apple Studios ===
Following the Beatles' break-up, McDonald continued working on solo recordings by all four members. His credits included Paul McCartney's McCartney (1970), John Lennon's John Lennon/Plastic Ono Band (1970) and Imagine (1971), George Harrison's All Things Must Pass (1970), and Ringo Starr's Sentimental Journey (1970).

McDonald was the principal recording engineer on All Things Must Pass, working with assistant engineer Philip Hancock and John Leckie. Leckie later recalled McDonald's emphasis on microphone placement and equalisation to achieve the desired sound, rather than relying on extensive additional equipment.

He moved from EMI to Apple in about 1971, taking a position as senior balance engineer. He worked there until at least 1974. In an April 1974 interview with Beat Instrumental, he described the greater independence available to engineers at Apple and its informal working atmosphere. At the time, he was recording Kilburn and the High Roads' debut album with producer Tony Ashton at Apple's studios in London's Savile Row.

=== Later work ===
McDonald's other engineering credits included recordings by Syd Barrett, Deep Purple, Eric Clapton, Harry Nilsson and Roy Orbison, among others. Albums on which he worked included The Madcap Laughs (1970), Deep Purple in Rock (1970), Layla and Other Assorted Love Songs (1970), A Little Touch of Schmilsson in the Night (1973), Traveling Wilburys Vol. 1 (1988) and Mystery Girl (1989).

He also worked as a record producer, co-producing Squeeze's album Sweets from a Stranger (1982) with the band. He also co-produced Harrison's Gone Troppo (1982), alongside Harrison and Ray Cooper.

== Later life and death ==
After retiring from the music business in 2001, McDonald moved with his wife Sandra to New York. Later a resident of Fort Lauderdale, Florida, McDonald died from kidney failure on 25 October 2026, aged 80. Abbey Road Studios announced McDonald's death on 27 October. He was survived by his wife.
