= Everest (disambiguation) =

Mount Everest is the Earth's highest mountain peak, located on the Nepal / China border in Asia.

Everest or Mount Everest may also refer to:

== Places ==
- Everest, Kansas, a small city in Brown County, Kansas, United States
- Everest, North Dakota, an unincorporated community in Cass County, North Dakota, United States
- Everest base camps, two base camps, each on opposite sides of Mount Everest
- Everest gasfield, a gasfield located in the Central North Sea, near Aberdeen, Scotland
- Tenzing-Hillary Airport, aka. Lukla Airport, sometimes also called Mt. Everest airport, a Nepalese airport
- Everest (restaurant), a Michelin rated French restaurant in Chicago

== Arts, entertainment, and media ==
=== Films ===
- Everest (1998 film), a US documentary film
- Everest (2015 film), a US biographical film
- Everest: The Other Side, a documentary film

=== Literature ===
- "Everest" (short story), a 1953 science fiction short story by Isaac Asimov

=== Television ===
- Everest (Indian TV series), a 2015-2016 Indian telenovela series
- Everest '82, a 2008 Canadian drama film miniseries
- Everest: Beyond the Limit, a 2006-2009 US reality television series

=== Music ===
- Everest (band), an American rock band
- Everest Records, a defunct American stereophonic record label
- Everest (opera), an English-language one-act opera composed by Joby Talbot
- Everest (album), by Halestorm, 2025
- "Everest", a 2023 single by Dream, featuring Yung Gravy

== People ==
- Barbara Everest (1890–1968), British actress
- F. Alton Everest (1909–2005), American acoustical engineer
- Frank F. Everest (1904–1983), US Air Force general
- Frank Kendall Everest, Jr. (1920–2004), US Air Force officer
- George Everest (1790–1866), Surveyor General of India, namesake of Mount Everest
- Hiram Bond Everest (1830–1913), American inventor
- Jack Everest (born 1908), Irish footballer
- James Everest (1918–1992), New Zealand cricketer
- Josiah T. Everest (1800–1873), American lawyer and politician
- Kate Asaphine Everest (later Levi) (1859–1939), American writer and social worker
- Mary Everest Boole (1832–1916), née Everest, British mathematician and author
- Timothy Everest (born 1961), Welsh fashion designer
- Wesley Everest (1890–1919), American member of the Industrial Workers of the World (IWW) and World War I veteran
- Everest Okpara, Nigerian entrepreneur and philanthropist

== Brands and enterprises ==
- Everest (cigarette), a cigarette brand, manufactured, distributed and market by the Zimbabwe arm of British American Tobacco company.
- Everest Home Improvement, a British double glazing and home improvement company
- Ford Everest, a sport utility vehicle produced by the Ford Motor Company
- Everest Spices, an Indian spices brand
- Everest Re, a Bermuda-based provider of reinsurance and insurance

== Education ==
- Everest College, a system of for-profit colleges in the United States and the Canadian province of Ontario
- Everest University, a part of the Corinthian Colleges' family of schools

== Sport ==
- Club Deportivo Everest, an Ecuador football team
- Mount Everest Nepal, a Palaua football club
- The Everest, an annual Australian Turf Club horse race run since 2017
- Everest Marathon, an annual marathon event, held around the vicinity of Mount Everest

== Other uses ==
- EVEREST, a 2007 study of US voting machines; see Patrick Drew McDaniel § Voting Systems Security
- Expedition Everest, a steel roller coaster located at Disney's Animal Kingdom in Florida, USA
- Everest, an Armstrong Whitworth Ensign aircraft
- Everest, a husky character in the animated TV series Paw Patrol
- AIDA64, formerly known as Everest, a Windows diagnostics tool

== See also ==
- Everesting, repeated climbing of hills to ultimately cover the distance of Mount Everest's height
- Sagarmatha (disambiguation)
- Qomolangma (disambiguation)
