= George Harrison =

English musician (1943–2001)

George Harrison MBE
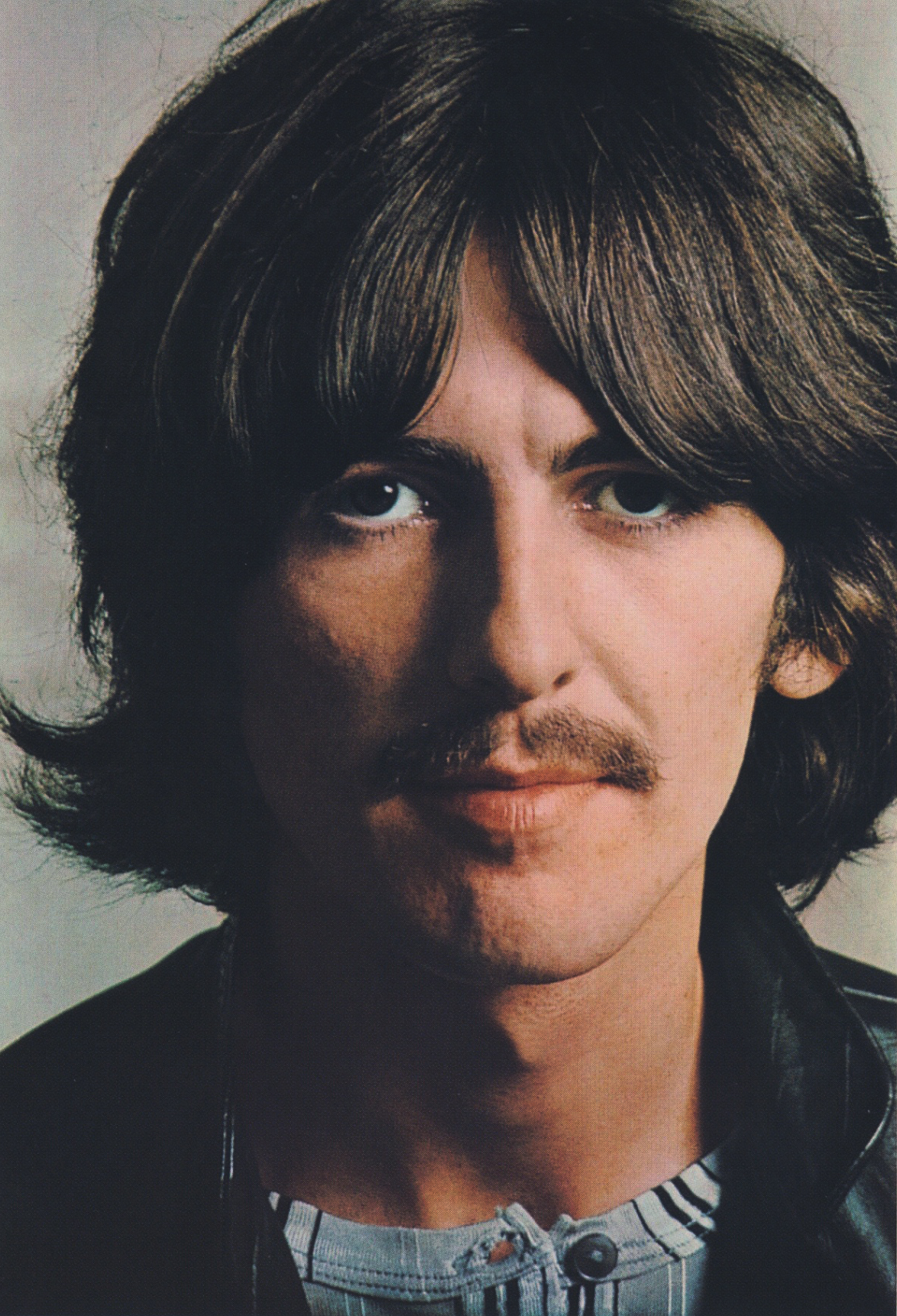
- Harrison in 1968
- Born: 25 February 1943; Liverpool, England
- Died: 29 November 2001 (aged 58); Los Angeles, California, US
- Occupations: Musician; singer; songwriter; music and film producer
- Years active: 1958–2001
- Spouses: Pattie Boyd (m. 1966; div. 1977); Olivia Arias (m. 1978)
- Children: Dhani Harrison
- Musical career
- Genres: Rock; pop; Indian classical
- Instruments: Guitar; vocals; sitar; keyboards; ukulele; bass guitar
- Works: Discography; songs
- Labels: Parlophone; Capitol; Swan; Apple; Vee-Jay; Dark Horse; Gnome
- Formerly of: The Quarrymen; The Beatles; Plastic Ono Band; Delaney & Bonnie and Friends; Traveling Wilburys
- Website: georgeharrison.com

George Harrison (Note: Some published sources give Harold as Harrison's middle name. However, there is no middle name on his birth certificate.) (25 February 1943 (Note: Author Barry Miles writes that Harrison was born at 11:42 pm on 24 February. Author Mark Lewisohn writes that it was 12:10 am on 25 February, with that date provided on both Harrison's birth and baptism certificates. Harrison had recognised 25 February as his birthday for most of his life before stating in a 1992 Billboard article that he had recently learned it was 24 February.) – 29 November 2001) was an English musician who achieved international fame with the Beatles, in which he initially played lead guitar and later adopted rhythm and bass guitar, organ, and non-Western instruments. Known as "the quiet Beatle", Harrison played a significant role in shaping the band's musical direction and established a successful solo career, particularly through his interest in Eastern musical influences.

Although most of the band's songs were written by John Lennon and Paul McCartney, most Beatles albums contained at least one Harrison composition. These included "Taxman", "Within You Without You", "While My Guitar Gently Weeps", "Something" and "Here Comes the Sun". Harrison's earliest musical influences included George Formby and Django Reinhardt; subsequent influences were Carl Perkins, Chet Atkins and Chuck Berry. By 1965, he had begun to lead the Beatles into folk rock through his interest in Bob Dylan and the Byrds, and towards Indian classical music, which he had become acquainted with on the set of the film Help! He played sitar on numerous Beatles songs, starting with "Norwegian Wood (This Bird Has Flown)". Having initiated the band's embrace of Transcendental Meditation in 1967, he subsequently developed an association with the Hare Krishna movement. Harrison's first marriage, to Pattie Boyd, a model, in 1966, ended in divorce in 1977. In the following year he married Olivia Arias, with whom he had a son, Dhani.

After the Beatles disbanded, Harrison released the triple album All Things Must Pass, a critically acclaimed work that produced his most successful hit single, "My Sweet Lord", and introduced the signature sound of his solo efforts: the slide guitar. He also organised the 1971 Concert for Bangladesh with the Indian musician Ravi Shankar, a precursor to benefit concerts such as Live Aid. In his role as a music and film producer, Harrison produced acts signed to the Beatles' Apple record label before founding Dark Horse Records in 1974. He co-founded HandMade Films in 1978, initially to produce Monty Python's Life of Brian (1979).

Harrison released several best-selling singles and albums as a solo performer. In 1988, he co-founded the platinum-selling supergroup the Traveling Wilburys alongside Roy Orbison, Bob Dylan, Tom Petty and Jeff Lynne. A prolific recording artist, he was featured as a guest guitarist on tracks by Badfinger, Ronnie Wood, and Billy Preston. Rolling Stone ranked him number 31 in their 2023 list of greatest guitarists of all time. He is a two-time Rock and Roll Hall of Fame inductee – as a member of the Beatles in 1988, and posthumously for his solo career in 2004. A lifelong smoker, Harrison died of cancer in 2001 at the age of 58. His life was chronicled in Martin Scorsese's documentary George Harrison: Living in the Material World (2011).

== Early years: 1943–1958 ==
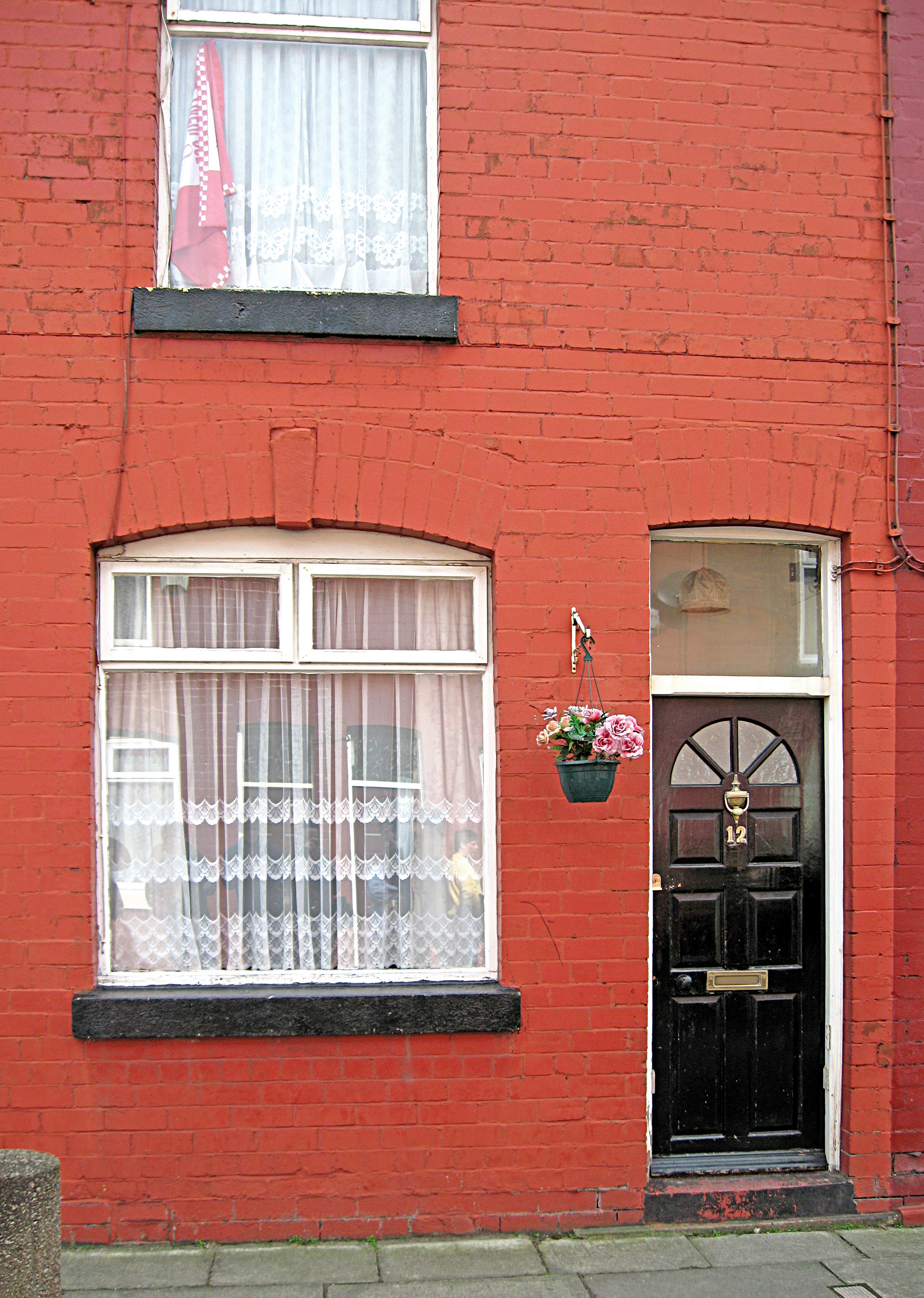
Harrison's place of birth and first home, 12 Arnold Grove

George Harrison was born at 12 Arnold Grove in Wavertree, Liverpool, on 25 February 1943. He was the youngest of four children of Harold Hargreaves (or Hargrove) Harrison and Louise (née French). Harold was a bus conductor who had worked as a ship's steward on the White Star Line, and Louise was a shop assistant of Irish Catholic descent. He had one sister, Louise, and two brothers, Harold and Peter.

According to Boyd, Harrison's mother was particularly supportive: "All she wanted for her children is that they should be happy, and she recognised that nothing made George quite as happy as making music." Louise was an enthusiastic music fan, and she was known among friends for her loud singing voice, which at times startled visitors by rattling the Harrisons' windows. When Louise was pregnant with George, she often listened to the weekly broadcast Radio India. Harrison's biographer Joshua Greene wrote, "Every Sunday she tuned in to mystical sounds evoked by sitars and tablas, hoping that the exotic music would bring peace and calm to the baby in the womb."

Harrison lived at 12 Arnold Grove until 1 January 1950. A terraced house on a cul-de-sac, it had an outdoor toilet, and its only heat came from a single coal fire. In the autumn of 1949, the family was offered a council house and moved to 25 Upton Green, Speke. In 1948, Harrison enrolled at Dovedale Primary School. He passed the eleven-plus exam and attended Liverpool Institute High School for Boys from 1954 to 1959. Though the institute did offer a music course, Harrison was disappointed with the absence of guitars, and felt that the school "moulded [students] into being frightened".

Harrison's earliest musical influences included George Formby, Cab Calloway, Django Reinhardt and Hoagy Carmichael; by the 1950s, Carl Perkins and Lonnie Donegan were significant influences. In early 1956, he had an epiphany: while riding his bicycle, he heard Elvis Presley's "Heartbreak Hotel" playing from a nearby house, and the song piqued his interest in rock and roll. He often sat at the back of the class drawing guitars in his schoolbooks, and later commented, "I was totally into guitars." Harrison cited Slim Whitman as another early influence: "The first person I ever saw playing a guitar was Slim Whitman, either a photo of him in a magazine or live on television. Guitars were definitely coming in."

When George Harrison was about 14, a friend of Harrison, Raymond Hughes, offered to sell a guitar. Harrison's mother then paid for the guitar, which cost £3.10s. (equivalent to £80 in 2025). One of his father's friends taught Harrison how to play "Whispering", "Sweet Sue" and "Dinah". Inspired by Donegan's music, Harrison formed a skiffle group, the Rebels, with his brother Peter and a friend, Arthur Kelly. On the bus to school, Harrison met Paul McCartney, who also attended the Liverpool Institute, and the pair bonded over their shared love of music.

== The Beatles: 1958–1970 ==
McCartney and his friend John Lennon were in a skiffle group called the Quarrymen. In March 1958, at McCartney's urging, Harrison auditioned for the Quarrymen at Rory Storm's Morgue Skiffle Club, playing Arthur "Guitar Boogie" Smith's "Guitar Boogie Shuffle", but Lennon felt that Harrison, having just turned 15, was too young to join the band. McCartney arranged a second meeting, on the upper deck of a Liverpool bus, during which Harrison impressed Lennon by performing the lead guitar part for the instrumental "Raunchy". He began socialising with the group, filling in on guitar as needed, and then became accepted as a member. Although his father wanted him to continue his education, Harrison left school at 16 and worked for several months as an apprentice electrician at Blacklers, a local department store. During the group's first tour of Scotland, in 1960, Harrison used the pseudonym "Carl Harrison", in reference to Carl Perkins.

Harrison at a Beatles press conference in Amsterdam in 1964

In 1960, promoter Allan Williams arranged for the band, now calling themselves the Beatles, to play at the Indra and Kaiserkeller clubs in Hamburg, both owned by Bruno Koschmider. Their first residency in Hamburg ended prematurely when Harrison was deported for being too young to work in nightclubs. When Brian Epstein became their manager in December 1961, he polished up their image and later secured them a recording contract with EMI. The group's first single, "Love Me Do", peaked at number 17 on the Record Retailer chart, and by the time their debut album, Please Please Me, was released in early 1963, Beatlemania had arrived. Often serious and focused while on stage with the band, Harrison was known as the "Quiet Beatle". That moniker arose when the Beatles arrived in the United States in early 1964, and Harrison was ill with a case of strep throat and a fever and was medically advised to limit speaking as much as possible until he performed on The Ed Sullivan Show as scheduled. As such, the press noticed Harrison's apparent laconic nature in public appearances on that tour and the subsequent nickname stuck, much to Harrison's amusement. He had two lead vocal credits on the LP, including the Lennon–McCartney song "Do You Want to Know a Secret?", and three on their second album, With the Beatles (1963). The latter included "Don't Bother Me", Harrison's first solo writing credit.

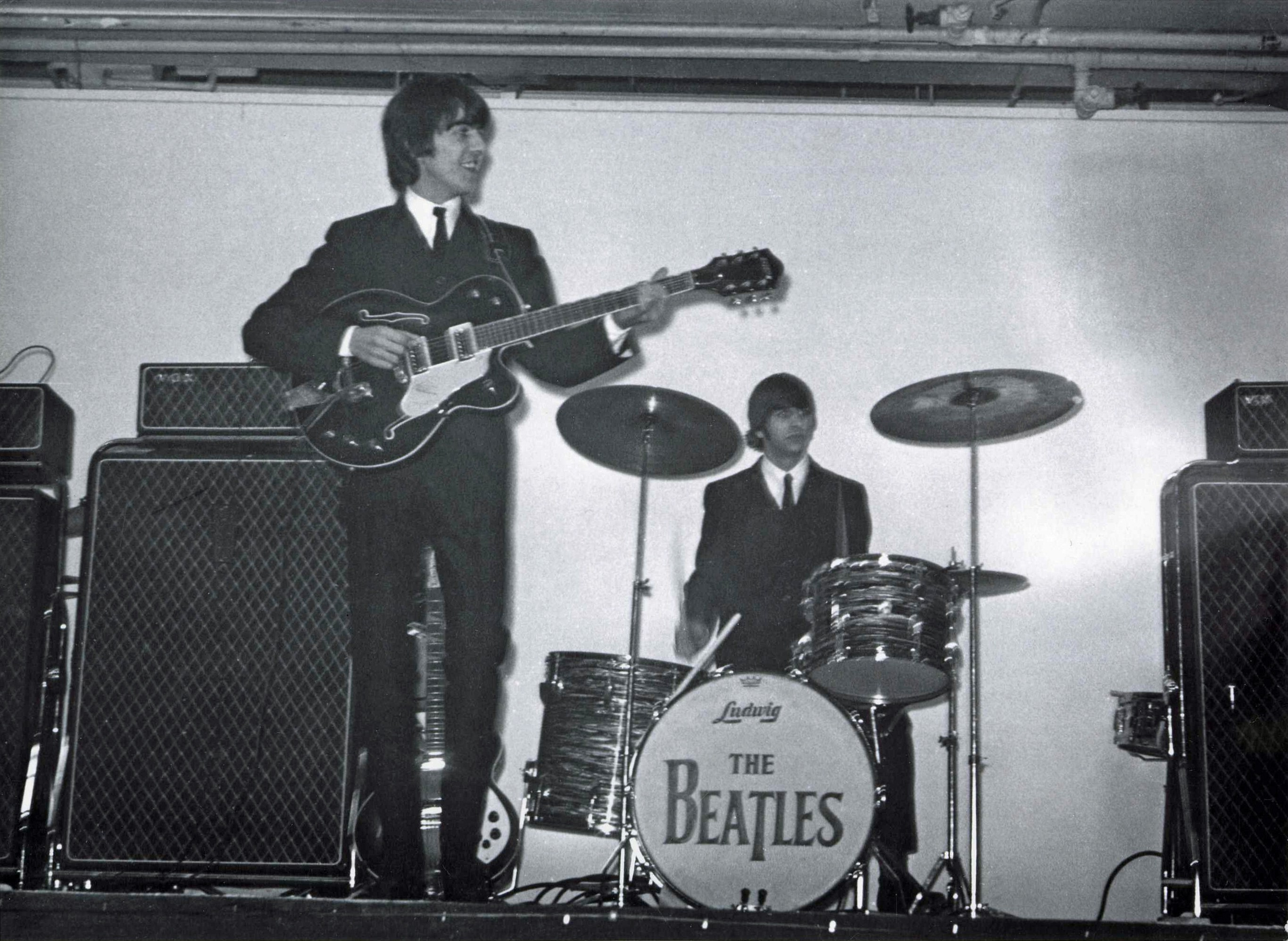
Harrison (left) and Ringo Starr (right) performing at the King's Hall in Belfast, 1964

Harrison served as the Beatles' scout for new American releases, being especially knowledgeable about soul music. By Rubber Soul (1965), he had begun to lead the other Beatles into folk rock through his interest in the Byrds and Bob Dylan, and towards Indian classical music through his use of the sitar on "Norwegian Wood (This Bird Has Flown)". (Note: Harrison also contributed the songs "If I Needed Someone" and "Think for Yourself" to Rubber Soul.) He later called Rubber Soul his favourite Beatles album. Revolver (1966) included three of his compositions: "Taxman", selected as the album's opening track, "Love You To" and "I Want to Tell You". His drone-like tambura part on Lennon's "Tomorrow Never Knows" exemplified the band's ongoing exploration of non-Western instruments, while the sitar- and tabla-based "Love You To" represented the Beatles' first genuine foray into Indian music. According to the ethnomusicologist David Reck, the latter song set a precedent in popular music as an example of Asian culture being represented by Westerners respectfully and without parody. Author Nicholas Schaffner wrote in 1978 that following Harrison's increased association with the sitar after "Norwegian Wood", he became known as "the maharaja of raga-rock". Harrison continued to develop his interest in non-Western instrumentation, playing swarmandal on "Strawberry Fields Forever".

By late 1966, Harrison's interests had moved away from the Beatles. This was reflected in his choice of Eastern gurus and religious leaders for inclusion on the album cover for Sgt. Pepper's Lonely Hearts Club Band (1967). (Note: The Self-Realization Fellowship gurus Mahavatar Babaji, Lahiri Mahasaya, Sri Yukteswar and Paramahansa Yogananda appear on the Sgt Pepper cover at his request.) His sole composition on the album was the Indian-inspired "Within You Without You", to which no other Beatle contributed. He played sitar and tambura on the track, backed by musicians from the London Asian Music Circle on dilruba, swarmandal and tabla. (Note: Further examples of Indian instrumentation from Harrison during his Beatles years include his tambura parts on McCartney's "Getting Better" and Lennon's "Lucy in the Sky with Diamonds" (both 1967), and sitar and tambura on Lennon's "Across the Universe" (1968).) He later reflected on Sgt. Pepper: "It was a millstone and a milestone in the music industry ... There's about half the songs I like and the other half I can't stand."

In January 1968, he recorded the basic track for his song "The Inner Light" at EMI's studio in Bombay, using a group of local musicians playing traditional Indian instruments. Released as the B-side to McCartney's "Lady Madonna", it was the first Harrison composition to appear on a Beatles single. Derived from a quotation from the Tao Te Ching, the song's lyric reflected Harrison's deepening interest in Hinduism and meditation. During the recording of The Beatles (1968), tensions within the group ran high, and drummer Ringo Starr quit briefly. Harrison's four songwriting contributions to the double album included "While My Guitar Gently Weeps", which featured Eric Clapton on lead guitar, and the horn-driven "Savoy Truffle".

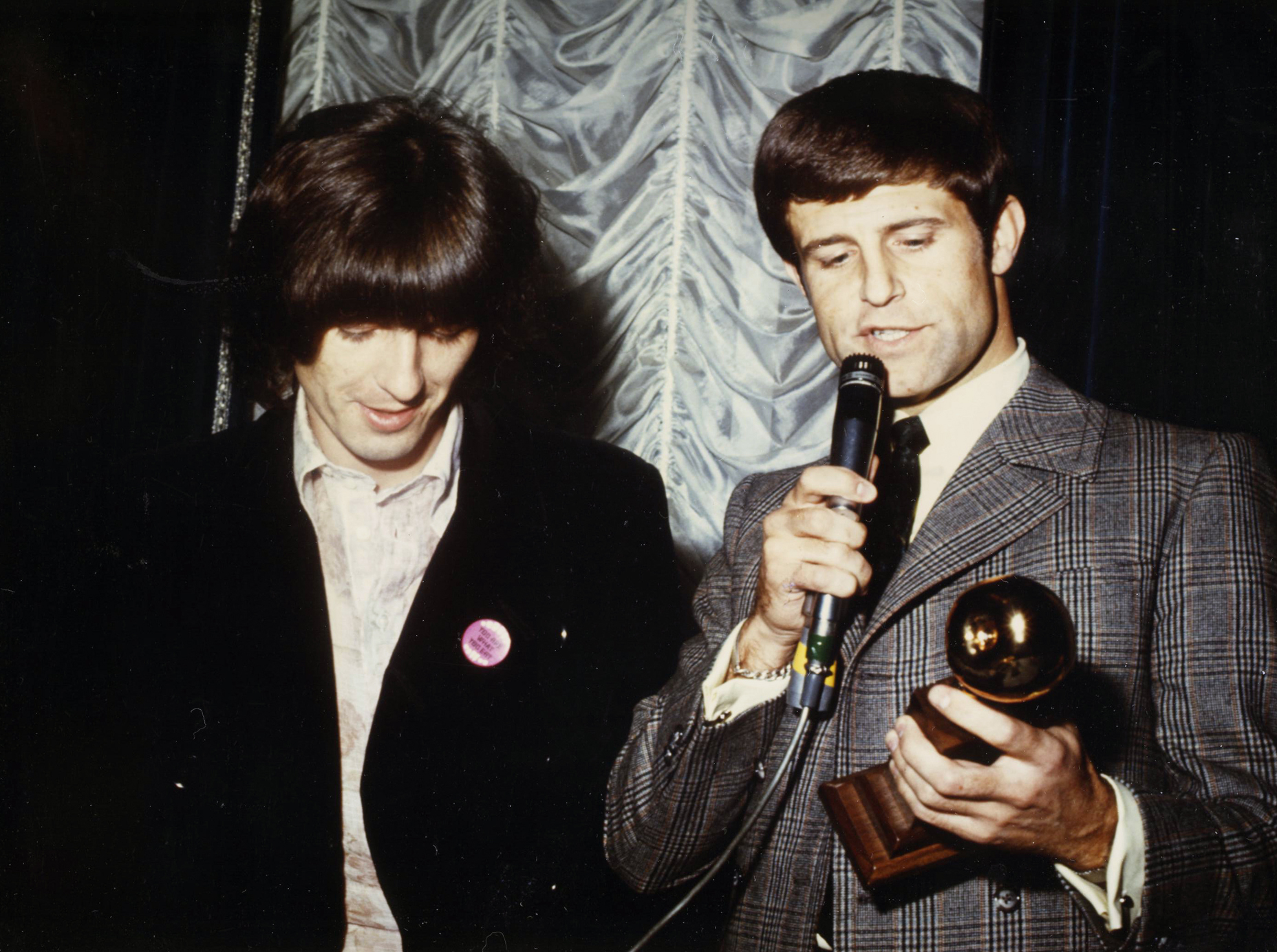
Harrison (left, with Don Grierson), in Los Angeles in October 1968

Dylan and the Band were a major musical influence on Harrison at the end of his career with the Beatles. While on a visit to Woodstock in late 1968, he established a friendship with Dylan and found himself drawn to the Band's sense of communal music-making and to the creative equality among the band members, which contrasted with Lennon and McCartney's domination of the Beatles' songwriting and creative direction. This coincided with a prolific period in his songwriting and a growing desire to assert his independence from the Beatles. Tensions among the group surfaced again in January 1969, at Twickenham Studios, during the filmed rehearsals that became the 1970 documentary Let It Be. Frustrated by the cold and sterile film studio, by Lennon's creative disengagement from the Beatles, and by what he perceived as a domineering attitude from McCartney, Harrison quit the group on 10 January. He returned 12 days later, after his bandmates had agreed to move the film project to their own Apple Studio and to abandon McCartney's plan for making a return to public performance.

"Something"
The love ballad "Something" from the Beatles' 1969 studio album Abbey Road is widely praised as one of Harrison's greatest songwriting achievements

Relations among the Beatles were more cordial, though still strained, when the band recorded Abbey Road (1969). The LP included what Lavezzoli describes as "two classic contributions" from Harrison – "Here Comes the Sun" and "Something" – that saw him "finally achieve equal songwriting status" with Lennon and McCartney. During the album's recording, Harrison asserted more creative control than before, rejecting suggestions for changes to his music, particularly from McCartney. "Something" became his first A-side when issued on a double A-side single with "Come Together"; the song was number one in Canada, Australia, New Zealand and West Germany, and the combined sides topped the Billboard Hot 100 chart in the United States. In the 1970s Frank Sinatra recorded "Something" twice (1970 and 1979) and later dubbed it "the greatest love song of the past fifty years". Lennon considered it the best song on Abbey Road, and it became the Beatles' second most covered song after "Yesterday". (Note: Harrison received an Ivor Novello award in July 1970 for "Something", as "The Best Song Musically and Lyrically of the Year".) In May 1970, Harrison's song "For You Blue" was coupled on a US single with McCartney's "The Long and Winding Road" and became Harrison's second chart-topper when the sides were listed together at number one on the Hot 100. His increased productivity meant that by the time of their break-up he had amassed a stockpile of unreleased compositions. While Harrison grew as a songwriter, his compositional presence on Beatles albums remained limited to two or three songs, increasing his frustration, and significantly contributing to the band's break-up. Harrison's last recording session with the Beatles was on 4 January 1970, when he, McCartney and Starr recorded overdubs to "Let It Be" for the soundtrack album of the same name.

== Solo career: 1968–1987 ==
=== Early solo work: 1968–1969 ===
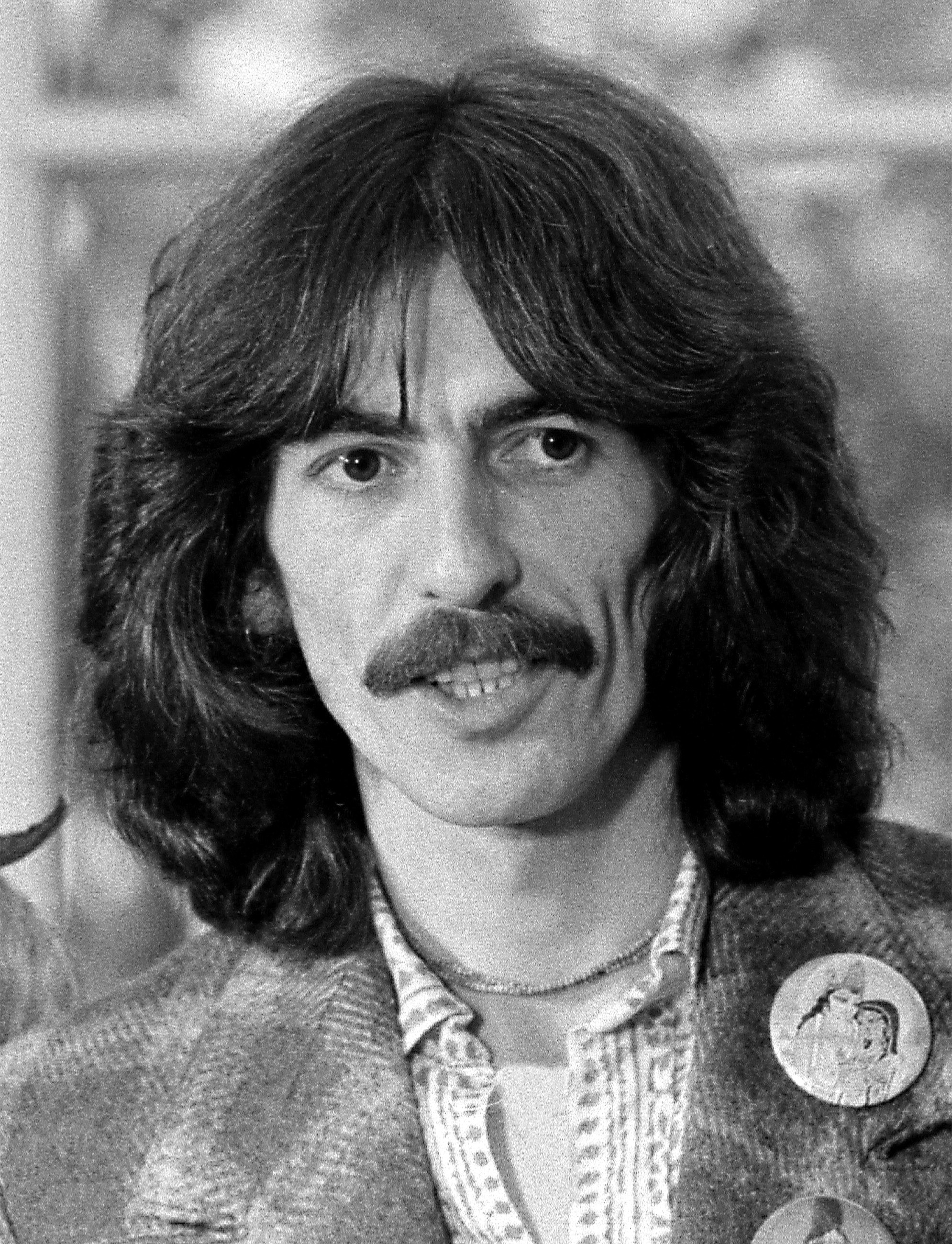
Harrison in the Oval Office in 1974

Before the Beatles' break-up, Harrison had already recorded and released two solo albums: Wonderwall Music and Electronic Sound, both of which contain mainly instrumental compositions. Wonderwall Music, a soundtrack to the 1968 film Wonderwall, blends Indian and Western instrumentation, while Electronic Sound is an experimental album that prominently features a Moog synthesizer. Released in November 1968, Wonderwall Music was the first solo album by a Beatle and the first LP released by Apple Records. Indian musicians Aashish Khan and Shivkumar Sharma performed on the album, which contains the experimental sound collage "Dream Scene", recorded several months before Lennon's "Revolution 9".

In December 1969, Harrison participated in a brief tour of Europe with the American group Delaney & Bonnie and Friends. During the tour, which included Clapton, Bobby Whitlock, drummer Jim Gordon and band leaders Delaney and Bonnie Bramlett, Harrison began to play slide guitar, and also began to write "My Sweet Lord", which became his first single as a solo artist.

=== All Things Must Pass: 1970 ===
For many years, Harrison was restricted in his songwriting contributions to the Beatles' albums, but he released All Things Must Pass, a triple album with two discs of his songs and the third of recordings of Harrison jamming with friends. The album was regarded by many as his best work, and it topped the charts on both sides of the Atlantic. (Note: In July 2006, it was determined that All Things Must Pass should have been credited as a number one album in the United Kingdom when first released in 1970–71. Because some sales were not properly counted, the album originally peaked at number four in Britain.) The number-one hit single "My Sweet Lord" and the top-ten single "What Is Life" were taken from the album, which was co-produced by Phil Spector using his "Wall of Sound" approach; the musicians included Starr, Clapton, Gary Wright, Billy Preston, Klaus Voormann, the whole of Delaney and Bonnie's Friends band, and the Apple group Badfinger. (Note: Early in the sessions, Clapton, Whitlock, Gordon and Carl Radle formed the short-lived band Derek and the Dominos.) On its release, All Things Must Pass was received with critical acclaim; Ben Gerson of Rolling Stone described it as being "of classic Spectorian proportions, Wagnerian, Brucknerian, the music of mountain tops and vast horizons". Author and musicologist Ian Inglis considers the lyrics of the album's title track "a recognition of the impermanence of human existence ... a simple and poignant conclusion" to Harrison's former band. In 1971, Bright Tunes sued Harrison for copyright infringement over "My Sweet Lord", owing to its similarity to the 1963 Chiffons hit "He's So Fine". When the case was heard in the United States district court in 1976, he denied deliberately plagiarising the song, but lost the case, as the judge ruled that he had done so subconsciously.

In 2000, Apple Records released a thirtieth-anniversary edition of the album, and Harrison actively participated in its promotion. In an interview, he reflected on the work: "It's just something that was like my continuation from the Beatles, really. It was me sort of getting out of the Beatles and just going my own way ... it was a very happy occasion." He commented on the production: "Well, in those days it was like the reverb was kind of used a bit more than what I would do now. In fact, I don't use reverb at all. I can't stand it ... You know, it's hard to go back to anything thirty years later and expect it to be how you would want it now."

=== The Concert for Bangladesh: 1971 ===
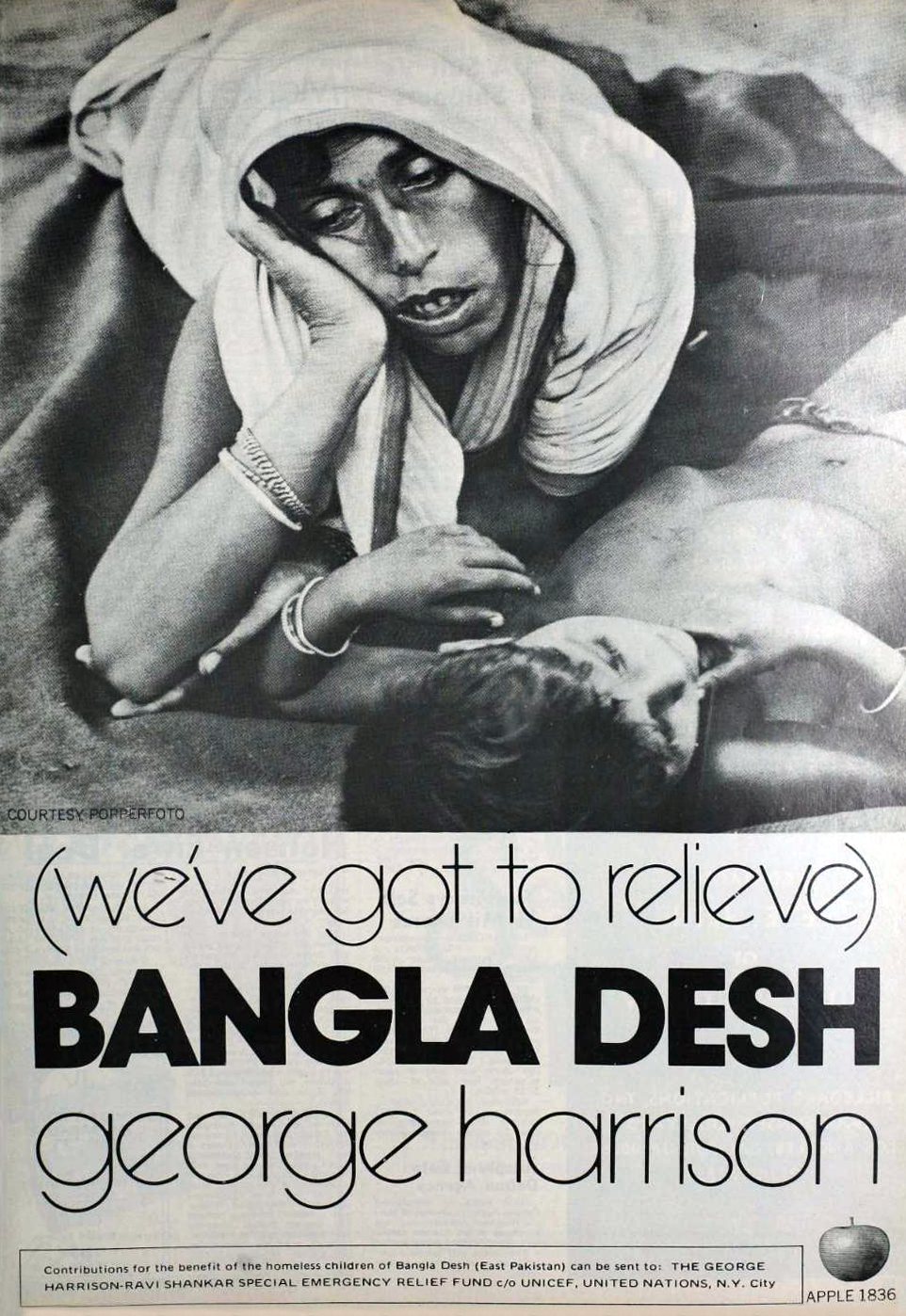
(Left): Harrison in 1971; (right): trade ad for Harrison's "Bangla Desh" single

Harrison responded to a request from Ravi Shankar by organising a charity event, the Concert for Bangladesh, which took place on 1 August 1971. The event drew over 40,000 people to two shows in New York's Madison Square Garden. The goal of the event was to raise money to aid starving refugees during the Bangladesh Liberation War. Shankar opened the show, which featured popular musicians such as Dylan, Clapton, Leon Russell, Badfinger, Preston and Starr.

A triple album, The Concert for Bangladesh, was released by Apple in December, followed by a concert film in 1972. (Note: In November 1971 Harrison appeared on The Dick Cavett Show, performing "Two-Faced Man" with Gary Wright. In his subsequent interview with Cavett, he used the opportunity to complain about Capitol's delay in releasing the live album and seeking a percentage of the funds intended for the Bangladeshi refugees.) Credited to "George Harrison and Friends", the album topped the UK chart and peaked at number 2 in the US, and went on to win the Grammy Award for Album of the Year. Tax troubles and questionable expenses later tied up many of the proceeds, but Harrison commented: "Mainly the concert was to attract attention to the situation ... The money we raised was secondary, and although we had some money problems ... they still got plenty ... even though it was a drop in the ocean. The main thing was, we spread the word and helped get the war ended."

=== Living in the Material World to George Harrison: 1973–1979 ===
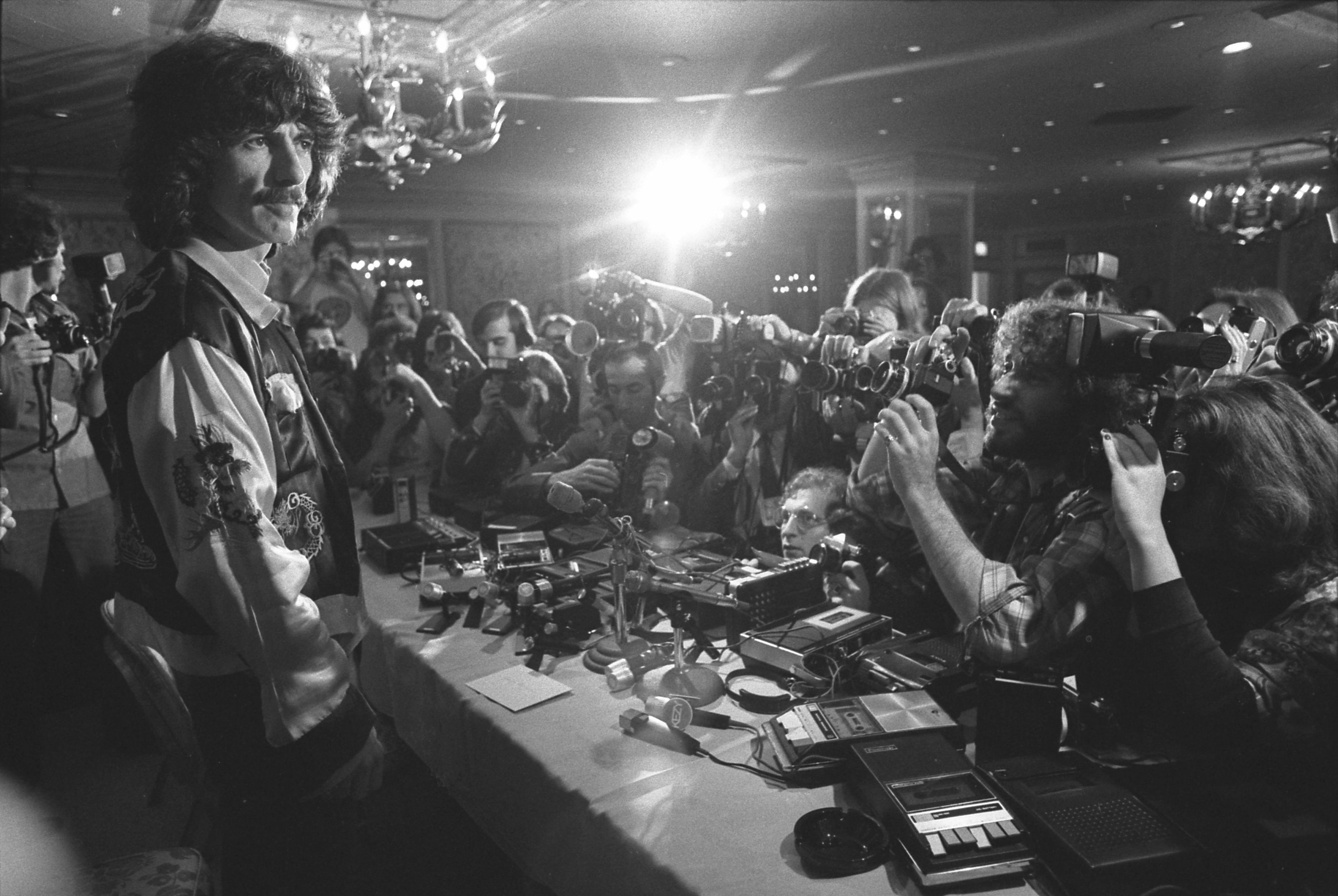
Harrison standing before a crowd of photographers in Los Angeles, California, in 1974

Harrison's Living in the Material World (1973) held the number one spot on the Billboard albums chart for five weeks, and the album's single, "Give Me Love (Give Me Peace on Earth)", also reached number one in the US. In the UK, the LP peaked at number two and the single reached number 8. The album was lavishly produced and packaged, and its dominant message was Harrison's Hindu beliefs. In Greene's opinion it "contained many of the strongest compositions of his career". Stephen Holden, writing in Rolling Stone, felt the album was "vastly appealing" and "profoundly seductive", and that it stood "alone as an article of faith, miraculous in its radiance". Other reviewers were less enthusiastic, describing the release as awkward, sanctimonious and overly sentimental.

In November 1974, Harrison became the first ex-Beatle to tour North America when he began his 45-date Dark Horse Tour. The shows included guest spots by his band members Billy Preston and Tom Scott, and traditional and contemporary Indian music performed by "Ravi Shankar, Family and Friends". Despite numerous positive reviews, the consensus reaction to the tour was negative. Some fans found Shankar's significant presence to be a bizarre disappointment, and many were affronted by what Inglis described as Harrison's "sermonizing". Further, he reworked the lyrics to several Beatles songs, and his laryngitis-affected vocals led to some critics calling the tour "dark hoarse". The author Robert Rodriguez commented: "While the Dark Horse tour might be considered a noble failure, there were a number of fans who were tuned-in to what was being attempted. They went away ecstatic, conscious that they had just witnessed something so uplifting that it could never be repeated." Simon Leng called the tour "groundbreaking" and "revolutionary in its presentation of Indian Music".

On 16 November 1974, Harrison and several others involved in the tour visited the White House. They were invited by President Gerald Ford's son, Jack.

In December, Harrison released Dark Horse, which was an album that earned him the least favourable reviews of his career. Rolling Stone called it "the chronicle of a performer out of his element, working to a deadline, enfeebling his overtaxed talents by a rush to deliver a new 'LP product', rehearse a band, and assemble a cross-country tour, all within three weeks". The album reached number 4 on the Billboard chart and the single "Dark Horse" reached number 15, but they failed to make an impact in the UK. (Note: In December 1974 the single, "Ding Dong, Ding Dong", reached number 38 in the UK.) The music critic Mikal Gilmore described Dark Horse as "one of Harrison's most fascinating works – a record about change and loss".

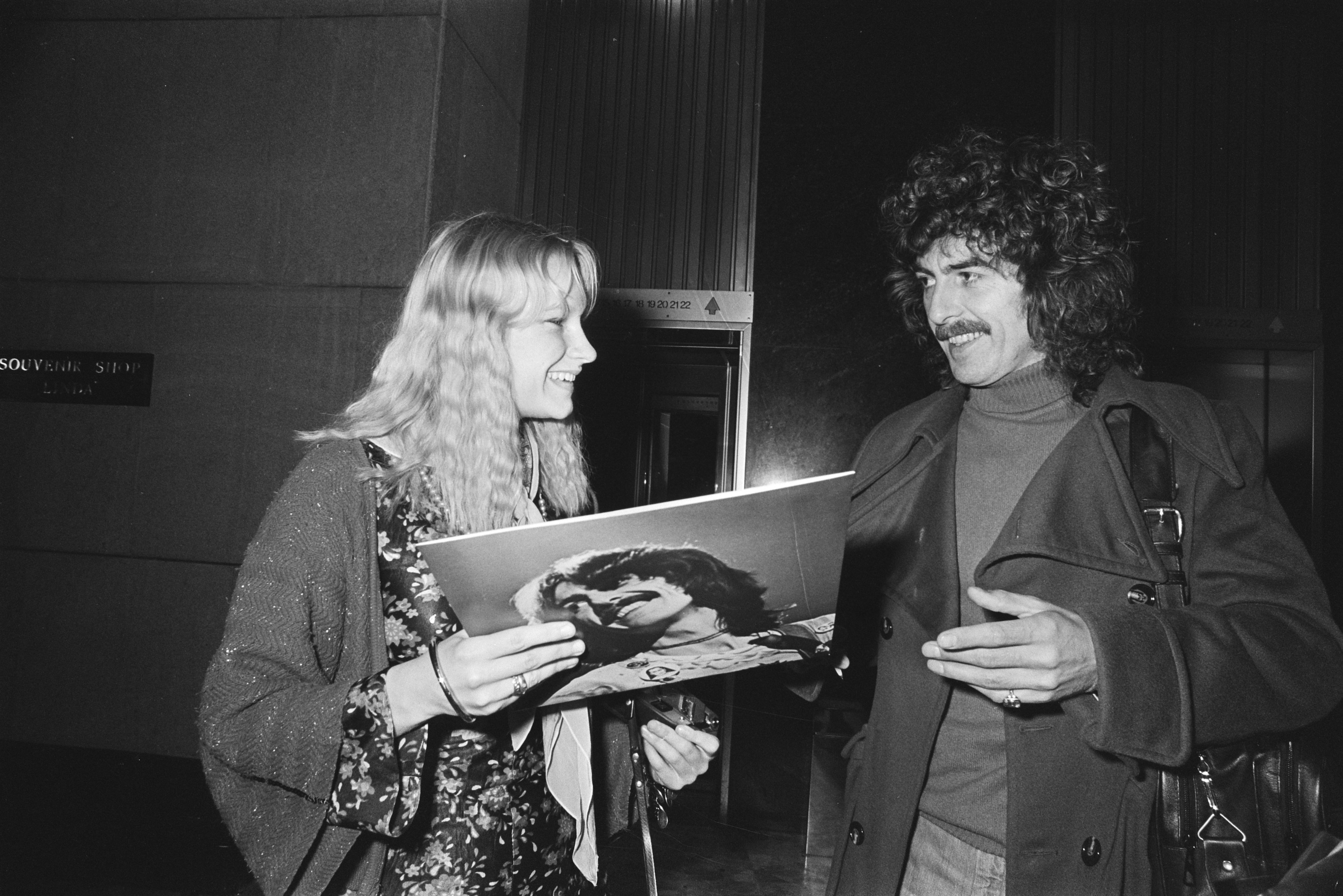
Harrison leaving the Hilton Hotel in Amsterdam, and signing an album for a fan, February 1977

Harrison's final studio album for EMI and Apple Records, the soul music-inspired Extra Texture (Read All About It) (1975), peaked at number 8 on the Billboard chart and number 16 in the UK. Harrison considered it the least satisfactory of the three albums he had recorded since All Things Must Pass. Leng identified "bitterness and dismay" in many of the tracks; his long-time friend Klaus Voormann commented: "He wasn't up for it ... It was a terrible time because I think there was a lot of cocaine going around, and that's when I got out of the picture ... I didn't like his frame of mind". He released two singles from the LP: "You", which reached the Billboard top 20, and "This Guitar (Can't Keep from Crying)", Apple's final original single release.

Thirty Three & 1/3 (1976), Harrison's first album release on his own Dark Horse Records label, produced the hit singles "This Song" and "Crackerbox Palace", both of which reached the top 25 in the US. (Note: Released during the same month, The Best of George Harrison combined several of his Beatles songs with a selection of his solo Apple work. After Harrison's departure from the label, Capitol was able to license releases featuring Beatles and post-Beatles work on the same album.) The surreal humour of "Crackerbox Palace" reflected Harrison's association with Monty Python's Eric Idle, who directed a comical music video for the song. With an emphasis on melody and musicianship, and a more subtle subject matter than the pious message of his earlier works, Thirty Three & 1/3 earned Harrison his most favourable critical notices in the US since All Things Must Pass. The album peaked just outside the top ten there, but outsold his previous two LPs. As part of his promotion for the release, Harrison performed on Saturday Night Live with Paul Simon.

In 1979, Harrison released George Harrison, which followed his second marriage and the birth of his son Dhani. Co-produced by Russ Titelman, the album and the single "Blow Away" both made the Billboard top 20. The album marked the beginning of Harrison's gradual retreat from the music business, with several of the songs having been written in the tranquil setting of Maui in the Hawaiian archipelago. Leng described George Harrison as "melodic and lush ... peaceful ... the work of a man who had lived the rock and roll dream twice over and was now embracing domestic as well as spiritual bliss".

=== Somewhere in England to Cloud Nine: 1980–1987 ===
The murder of John Lennon on 8 December 1980 disturbed Harrison and reinforced his decades-long concern about stalkers. The tragedy was also a deep personal loss, although Harrison and Lennon had little contact in the years before Lennon was killed. (Note: Their estrangement had been marked by Harrison's longstanding dislike of Lennon's wife Yoko Ono, his refusal to allow her to participate in the Concert for Bangladesh, and, during the last year of Lennon's life, by Harrison's scant mention of Lennon in his autobiography, I, Me, Mine.) Following the murder, Harrison commented: "After all we went through together I had and still have great love and respect for John Lennon. I am shocked and stunned." Harrison modified the lyrics of a song he had written for Starr to make the song a tribute to Lennon. "All Those Years Ago", which included vocal contributions from Paul and Linda McCartney, as well as Starr's original drum part, peaked at number two in the US charts. The single was included on the album Somewhere in England in 1981.

Harrison did not release any new albums for five years after 1982's Gone Troppo received little notice from critics or the public. During this period he made several guest appearances, including a 1985 performance at a tribute to Carl Perkins titled Blue Suede Shoes: A Rockabilly Session. (Note: Harrison's set included "That's Alright Mama", "Glad All Over" and "Blue Suede Shoes".) In March 1986 he made a surprise appearance during the finale of the Birmingham Heart Beat Charity Concert, an event organised to raise money for the Birmingham Children's Hospital. The following year, he appeared at The Prince's Trust concert at London's Wembley Arena, performing "While My Guitar Gently Weeps" and "Here Comes the Sun".

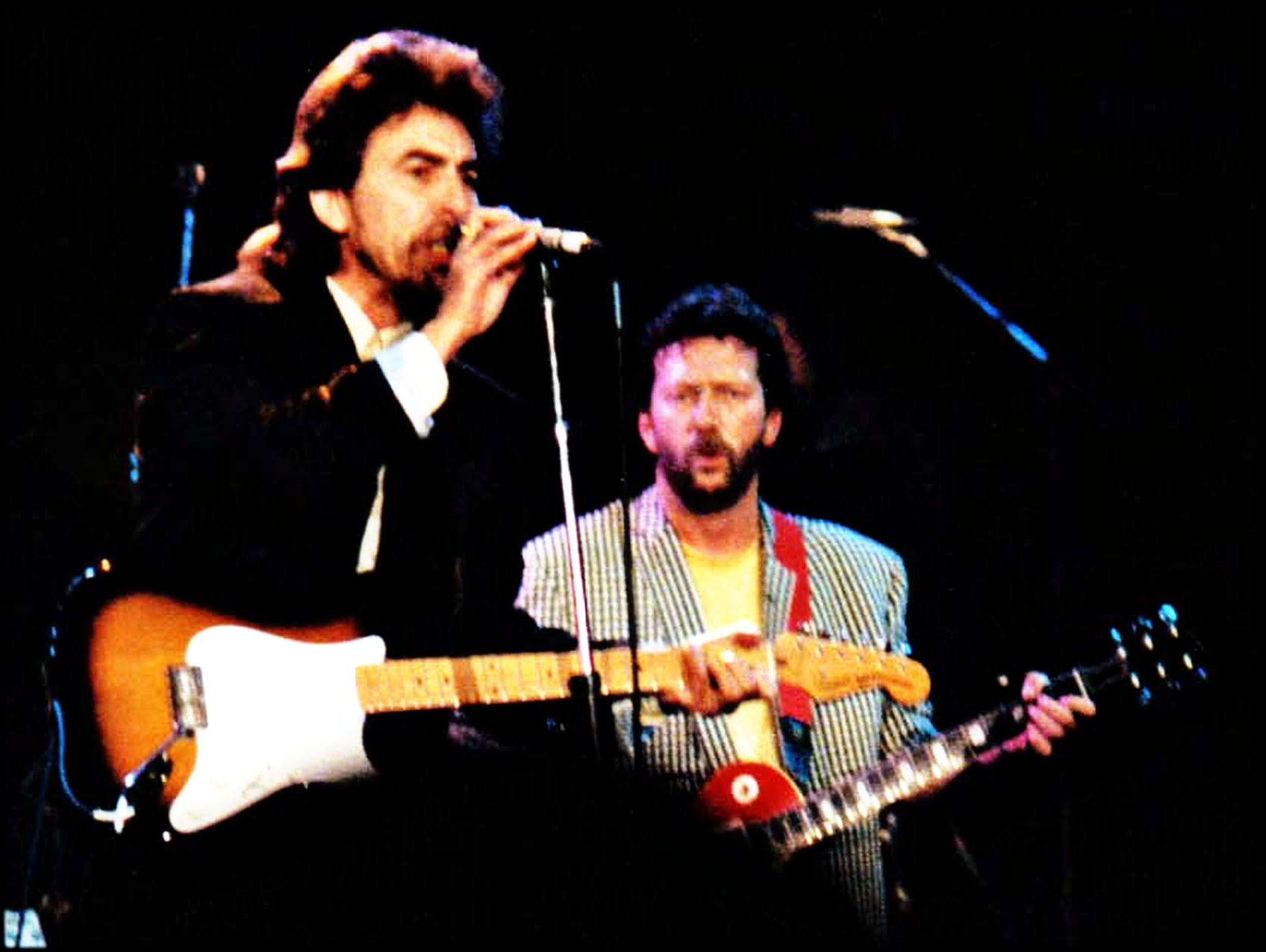
Harrison and Eric Clapton during the 1987 The Prince's Trust concert

Prior, in February 1987, he joined Dylan, John Fogerty and Jesse Ed Davis on stage for a two-hour performance with the blues musician Taj Mahal. Harrison recalled: "Bob rang me up and asked if I wanted to come out for the evening and see Taj Mahal ... So we went there and had a few of these Mexican beers – and had a few more ... Bob says, 'Hey, why don't we all get up and play, and you can sing?' But every time I got near the microphone, Dylan comes up and just starts singing this rubbish in my ear, trying to throw me."

In November 1987, Harrison released the platinum album Cloud Nine. Co-produced with Jeff Lynne of Electric Light Orchestra (ELO), the album included Harrison's rendition of James Ray's "Got My Mind Set on You", which went to number one in the US and number two in the UK. The accompanying music video received substantial airplay, and another single, "When We Was Fab", a retrospective of the Beatles' career, earned two MTV Music Video Awards nominations in 1988. Recorded at his estate in Friar Park, Harrison's slide guitar playing featured prominently on the album, which included several of his long-time musical collaborators, including Clapton, Jim Keltner and Jim Horn. Cloud Nine reached number eight and number ten on the US and UK charts respectively, and several tracks from the album achieved placement on Billboard's Mainstream Rock chart – "Devil's Radio", "This Is Love" and "Cloud 9".

== Later career: 1988–1996 ==
=== The Traveling Wilburys and return to touring: 1988–1992 ===
In 1988, Harrison formed the Traveling Wilburys with Roy Orbison, Bob Dylan, Jeff Lynne, and Tom Petty. The band had gathered in Dylan's garage to record a song for a Harrison European single release. Harrison's record company decided the track, "Handle with Care", was too good for its original purpose as a B-side and asked for a full album. The LP, Traveling Wilburys Vol. 1, was released in October 1988 and recorded under pseudonyms as half-brothers, supposed sons of Charles Truscott Wilbury Sr. It reached number 16 in the UK and number 3 in the US, where it was certified triple platinum. Harrison's pseudonym on the album was "Nelson Wilbury"; he used the name "Spike Wilbury" for their second album.

In 1989, Harrison and Starr appeared in the music video for Petty's song "I Won't Back Down". In October that year, Harrison assembled and released Best of Dark Horse 1976–1989, a compilation of his later solo work. The album included three new songs, including "Cheer Down", which Harrison had recently contributed to the Lethal Weapon 2 film soundtrack. After Orbison's death in December 1988, the Wilburys recorded as a four-piece. Their second album, issued in October 1990, was mischievously titled Traveling Wilburys Vol. 3. According to Lynne, "That was George's idea. He said, 'Let's confuse the buggers.'" It peaked at number 14 in the UK and number 11 in the US, where it was certified platinum. The Wilburys never performed live, and the group did not record together again following the release of their second album.

In December 1991, Harrison joined Clapton for a tour of Japan. It was Harrison's first since 1974 and no others followed. (Note: In 1992, Dark Horse Records released an album of recorded material from the shows titled Live in Japan.) On 6 April 1992, Harrison held a benefit concert for the Natural Law Party at the Royal Albert Hall, his first London performance since the Beatles' 1969 rooftop concert. In October 1992, he performed at a Bob Dylan tribute concert at Madison Square Garden in New York City, playing alongside Dylan, Clapton, McGuinn, Petty and Neil Young.

=== The Beatles Anthology: 1994–1996 ===
In 1994, Harrison began a collaboration with McCartney, Starr and producer Jeff Lynne for the Beatles Anthology project. This included the recording of two new Beatles songs built around solo vocal and piano tapes recorded by Lennon as well as lengthy interviews about the Beatles' career. Released in December 1995, "Free as a Bird" was the first new Beatles single since 1970. In March 1996, they released a second single, "Real Love". They also attempted to finish a third single, "Now and Then", but did not finish it because the audio quality of the cassette was, according to Harrison, "fucking rubbish". The song was later finished by McCartney and Starr and released in 2023. Harrison later commented on the project: "I hope somebody does this to all my crap demos when I'm dead, make them into hit songs."

== Later life and death: 1997–2001 ==
After the Anthology project, Harrison collaborated with Ravi Shankar on the latter's Chants of India. Harrison's final television appearance was a VH-1 special to promote the album, taped in May 1997. Soon afterwards, Harrison was diagnosed with throat cancer; he was treated with radiotherapy, which was thought at the time to be successful. He publicly blamed years of smoking for the illness.

In January 1998, Harrison attended Carl Perkins' funeral in Jackson, Tennessee, where he performed a brief rendition of Perkins' song "Your True Love". In May, he represented the Beatles at London's High Court in their successful bid to gain control of unauthorised recordings made of a 1962 performance by the band at the Star-Club in Hamburg. The following year, he was the most active of the former Beatles in promoting the reissue of their 1968 animated film Yellow Submarine.

=== Attack at Friar Park: 1999 ===
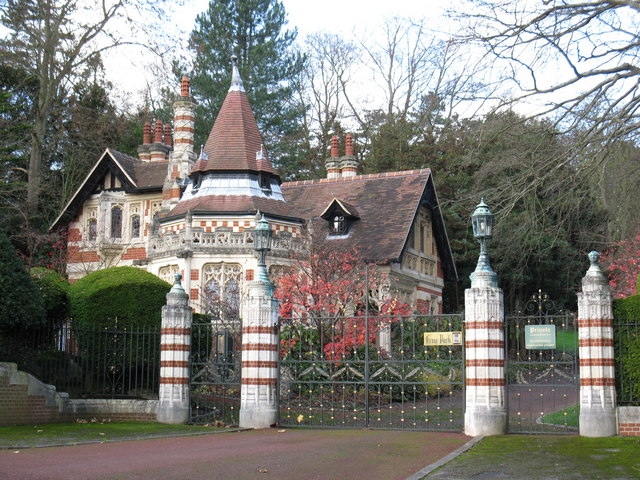
The entrance and gatehouse at Harrison's Friar Park estate in Henley-on-Thames. In December 1999, he and his wife Olivia were the victims of a knife attack by an intruder.

On 30 December 1999, Harrison and his wife Olivia were attacked at their home, Friar Park. The perpetrator was 34-year-old Michael Abram, who was later diagnosed with schizophrenia. Abram broke in and attacked Harrison with a kitchen knife, puncturing a lung and causing head injuries before he was incapacitated by Harrison's wife, who struck him repeatedly with a fireplace poker and a lamp. Harrison later commented, "I felt exhausted and could feel the strength draining from me. I vividly remember a deliberate thrust to my chest. I could hear my lung exhaling and had blood in my mouth. I believed I had been fatally stabbed".

After the attack, Harrison was hospitalised with more than 40 stab wounds, and part of his punctured lung was removed. He released a statement soon afterwards regarding his assailant: "He wasn't a burglar, and he certainly wasn't auditioning for the Traveling Wilburys. Adi Shankara, an Indian historical, spiritual and groovy-type person, once said, 'Life is fragile like a raindrop on a lotus leaf.' And you'd better believe it." (Note: Abram, who believed he was possessed by Harrison and that he was on a mission from God to kill him, was later acquitted of attempted murder on grounds of insanity and was detained for treatment in a secure mental hospital. He was released in 2002.)

When he was released from a psychiatric institution in 2002, Abram said: "If I could turn back the clock, I would give anything not to have done what I did in attacking George Harrison, but looking back on it now, I have come to understand that I was at the time not in control of my actions. I can only hope the Harrison family might somehow find it in their hearts to accept my apologies." The injuries inflicted on Harrison during the home invasion were downplayed by his family in their comments to the press. Having seen Harrison looking so healthy beforehand, those in his social circle believed that the attack brought about a change in him and was the cause for his cancer's return.

=== Death: 2001 ===
Harrison publicly blamed decades of heavy cigarette smoking for his throat cancer, which later developed in his lungs, and fatally metastasized to his brain. Pictured is the logo for Everest, a brand of cigarettes Geoff Emerick smoked with the Beatles during the Abbey Road sessions.

In May 2001, it was announced that Harrison had undergone an operation to remove a cancerous growth from one lung. In July 2001, it was reported that he was being treated for a brain tumour at a clinic in Switzerland. Starr visited him but had to cut short his stay to travel to Boston, where his daughter was undergoing emergency brain surgery. Harrison, who was very weak, quipped: "Do you want me to come with you?" In November 2001, he began radiotherapy at Staten Island University Hospital in New York City for non–small cell lung cancer that had spread to his brain. When the news was made public, Harrison bemoaned his physician's breach of privacy, and his estate later claimed damages. (Note: Harrison's estate complained that during a round of experimental radiotherapy at Staten Island University Hospital, the oncologist Gilbert Lederman repeatedly revealed Harrison's confidential medical information during television interviews and forced him to autograph a guitar. The suit was ultimately settled out of court under the condition that the guitar be "disposed of".)

On 29 November 2001, Harrison died at a property belonging to McCartney, on Heather Road in Los Angeles. He was 58 years old. He died in the company of Olivia, Dhani, Shankar, Shankar's wife Sukanya and daughter Anoushka, and Hare Krishna devotees Shyamasundar Das and Mukunda Goswami, who chanted verses from the Bhagavad Gita. His final message to the world, as relayed in a statement by Olivia and Dhani, was: "Everything else can wait, but the search for God cannot wait, and love one another." (Note: Another of his last messages was to actor and comedian Mike Myers on the set of Austin Powers in Goldmember. Harrison thanked Myers for the Austin Powers films and said that he had searched throughout Europe before finding his bedside companion, a Dr. Evil doll.) Eric Idle, who was close to Harrison, was present at his deathbed and said that Harrison was not frightened of death, and thought he would escape rebirth.

Harrison's body was cremated at Hollywood Forever Cemetery, and his funeral was held at the Self-Realization Fellowship Lake Shrine in Pacific Palisades, California. Idle, considering that "a lot of being funny is the lack of a censor mechanism", said at Harrison's funeral: "I'd like to thank Marlboro, without whom you wouldn't be here this morning", to a huge laugh. He added, "it's really not the right thing to say, but also, let's name the names of people responsible". Harrison's close family scattered his ashes according to Hindu tradition in a private ceremony in the Ganges and Yamuna rivers near Varanasi, India. He left almost £100 million in his will.

=== Final studio album and singles: 2002–2004 ===
Harrison's final studio album, Brainwashed (2002), was released posthumously after it was completed by his son Dhani and Jeff Lynne. A quotation from the Bhagavad Gita is included in the liner notes: "There never was a time when you or I did not exist. Nor will there be any future when we shall cease to be." A media-only single, "Stuck Inside a Cloud", which Leng describes as "a uniquely candid reaction to illness and mortality", reached number 27 on Billboard's Adult Contemporary chart. The single "Any Road", released in May 2003, reached number 37 on the UK singles chart. "Marwa Blues" received the 2004 Grammy Award for Best Pop Instrumental Performance, while "Any Road" was nominated for Best Male Pop Vocal Performance.

== Musicianship ==
=== Guitar work ===
Harrison's guitar work with the Beatles was versatile. Although not fast or flashy, his lead guitar playing was solid and typified the more subdued lead guitar style of the early 1960s. His rhythm guitar playing was innovative; for example, he used a capo to shorten the strings on an acoustic guitar, as on Rubber Soul (1965) and "Here Comes the Sun", to create a bright, sweet sound. Eric Clapton felt that Harrison was "clearly an innovator" as he was "taking certain elements of R&B and rock and rockabilly and creating something unique". Rolling Stone founder Jann Wenner described Harrison as "a guitarist who was never showy but who had an innate, eloquent melodic sense. He played exquisitely in the service of the song". The guitar picking style of Chet Atkins and Carl Perkins influenced Harrison, giving a country music feel to many Beatles recordings. Chuck Berry was another early influence.

In 1961, the Beatles recorded "Cry for a Shadow", a blues-inspired instrumental co-written by Lennon and Harrison, who is credited with composing the song's lead guitar part, building on unusual chord voicings and imitating the style of other English groups such as the Shadows. Harrison's liberal use of the diatonic scale in his guitar playing reveals the influence of Buddy Holly, and his interest in Berry inspired him to compose songs based on the blues scale while incorporating a rockabilly feel in the style of Perkins. (Note: Within this framework he often used syncopation, as during his guitar solos for the Beatles' covers of Berry's "Roll Over Beethoven" and "Too Much Monkey Business".) Another of Harrison's musical techniques was the use of guitar lines written in octaves, as on "I'll Be on My Way".

By 1964, he had begun to develop a distinctive personal style as a guitarist, writing parts that featured the use of nonresolving tones, as with the ending chord arpeggios on "A Hard Day's Night". On this and other songs from the period, he used a Rickenbacker 360/12 – an electric guitar with twelve strings, the low eight of which are tuned in pairs, one octave apart, with the higher four being pairs tuned in unison. His use of the Rickenbacker on A Hard Day's Night helped to popularise the model, and the jangly sound became so prominent that Melody Maker termed it the Beatles' "secret weapon". (Note: Roger McGuinn liked the effect so much that it became his signature guitar sound with the Byrds.) In 1965, Harrison used an expression pedal to control his guitar's volume on "I Need You", creating a syncopated flautando effect with the melody resolving its dissonance through tonal displacements. He used the same volume-swell technique on "Yes It Is", applying what Everett described as "ghostly articulation" to the song's natural harmonics.

Harrison contributed innovative musical ideas to Revolver (1966). He played backwards guitar on Lennon's composition "I'm Only Sleeping" and a guitar counter-melody on "And Your Bird Can Sing" that moved in parallel octaves above McCartney's bass downbeats. His guitar playing on "I Want to Tell You" exemplified the pairing of altered chordal colours with descending chromatic lines and his guitar part for Sgt Pepper's "Lucy in the Sky with Diamonds" mirrors Lennon's vocal line in much the same way that a sarangi player accompanies a khyal singer in a Hindu devotional song.

"Old Brown Shoe"
Harrison's guitar solo from "Old Brown Shoe", April 1969

"Something"
An excerpt from Harrison's guitar solo to "Something", May 1969

"How Do You Sleep?"
An excerpt from Harrison's slide guitar solo from Lennon's "How Do You Sleep?", 1971

Everett described Harrison's guitar solo from "Old Brown Shoe" as "stinging [and] highly Claptonesque". He identified two of the composition's significant motifs: a bluesy trichord and a diminished triad with roots in A and E. Huntley called the song "a sizzling rocker with a ferocious ... solo". In Greene's opinion, Harrison's demo for "Old Brown Shoe" contains "one of the most complex lead guitar solos on any Beatles song".

Harrison's playing on Abbey Road, and in particular on "Something", marked a significant moment in his development as a guitarist. The song's guitar solo shows a varied range of influences, incorporating the blues guitar style of Clapton and the styles of Indian gamakas. According to author and musicologist Kenneth Womack: "'Something' meanders toward the most unforgettable of Harrison's guitar solos ... A masterpiece in simplicity, [it] reaches toward the sublime".

After Delaney Bramlett inspired him to learn slide guitar, Harrison began to incorporate it into his solo work, which allowed him to mimic many traditional Indian instruments, including the sarangi and the dilruba. Leng described Harrison's slide guitar solo on Lennon's "How Do You Sleep?" as a departure for "the sweet soloist of 'Something'", calling his playing "rightly famed ... one of Harrison's greatest guitar statements". Lennon commented: "That's the best he's ever fucking played in his life."

A Hawaiian influence is notable in much of Harrison's music, ranging from his slide guitar work on Gone Troppo (1982) to his televised performance of the Cab Calloway standard "Between the Devil and the Deep Blue Sea" on ukulele in 1992. Lavezzoli described Harrison's slide playing on the Grammy-winning instrumental "Marwa Blues" (2002) as demonstrating Hawaiian influences while comparing the melody to an Indian sarod or veena, calling it "yet another demonstration of Harrison's unique slide approach". Harrison was an admirer of George Formby and a member of the Ukulele Society of Great Britain, and played a ukulele solo in the style of Formby at the end of "Free as a Bird". He performed at a Formby convention in 1991, and served as the honorary president of the George Formby Appreciation Society. Harrison played bass guitar on a few tracks, including the Beatles songs "She Said She Said", "Golden Slumbers", "Birthday" and "Honey Pie". He also played bass on several solo recordings, including "Faster", "Wake Up My Love" and "Bye Bye Love".

=== Sitar and Indian music ===
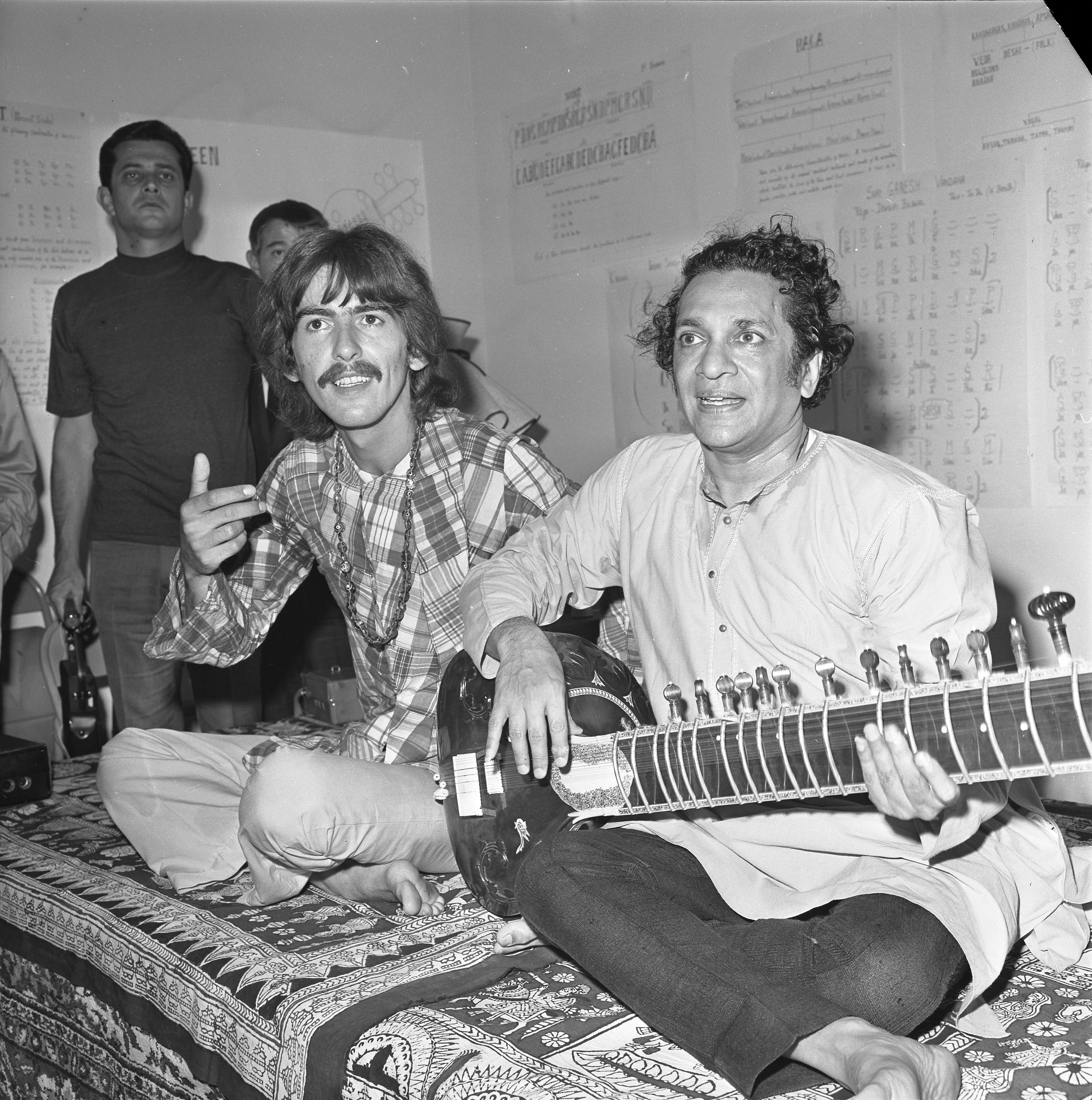
Harrison learned sitar from Ravi Shankar (pictured in 1967).

During the Beatles' American tour in August 1965, Harrison's friend David Crosby of the Byrds introduced him to Indian classical music and the work of sitar maestro Ravi Shankar. Harrison described Shankar as "the first person who ever impressed me in my life ... and he was the only person who didn't try to impress me." Harrison became fascinated with the sitar and immersed himself in Indian music. According to Lavezzoli, Harrison's introduction of the instrument on the Beatles' song "Norwegian Wood" "opened the floodgates for Indian instrumentation in rock music, triggering what Shankar called 'The Great Sitar Explosion' of 1966–67". Lavezzoli recognises Harrison as "the man most responsible for this phenomenon". (Note: Harrison was influential in the decision to have Shankar included on the bill at the Monterey Pop Festival in 1967, and at Woodstock in 1969.)

In June 1966, Harrison met Shankar at the home of Mrs Angadi of the Asian Music Circle, asked to be his student, and was accepted. Before this meeting, Harrison had recorded his Revolver track "Love You To", contributing a sitar part that Lavezzoli describes as an "astonishing improvement" over "Norwegian Wood" and "the most accomplished performance on sitar by any rock musician". On 6 July, Harrison travelled to India to buy a sitar from Rikhi Ram & Sons in New Delhi. In September, following the Beatles' final tour, he returned to India to study sitar for six weeks with Shankar. He initially stayed in Bombay until fans learned of his arrival, then moved to a houseboat on a remote lake in Kashmir. During this visit, he also received tutelage from Shambhu Das, Shankar's protégé.

Harrison studied the instrument until 1968, when, following a discussion with Shankar about the need to find his "roots", an encounter with Clapton and Jimi Hendrix at a hotel in New York convinced him to return to guitar playing. Harrison commented: "I decided ... I'm not going to be a great sitar player ... because I should have started at least fifteen years earlier." Harrison continued to use Indian instrumentation occasionally on his solo albums and remained strongly associated with the genre. Lavezzoli groups him with Paul Simon and Peter Gabriel as the three rock musicians who have given the most "mainstream exposure to non-Western musics, or the concept of 'world music'".

=== Songwriting ===
Harrison wrote his first song, "Don't Bother Me", while sick in a hotel bed in Bournemouth during August 1963, as "an exercise to see if I could write a song", as he remembered. His songwriting ability improved throughout the Beatles' career, but his material did not earn full respect from Lennon, McCartney and producer George Martin until near the group's break-up. In 1969, McCartney told Lennon: "Until this year, our songs have been better than George's. Now this year his songs are at least as good as ours". Harrison often had difficulty getting the band to record his songs. Most Beatles albums from 1965 onwards contain at least two Harrison compositions; three of his songs appear on Revolver, "the album on which Harrison came of age as a songwriter", according to Inglis.

"Within You Without You"
An audio sample of Harrison's "Within You Without You", 1967

Harrison wrote the chord progression of "Don't Bother Me" almost exclusively in the Dorian mode, demonstrating an interest in exotic tones that eventually culminated in his embrace of Indian music. The latter proved a strong influence on his songwriting and contributed to his innovation within the Beatles. According to Mikal Gilmore of Rolling Stone, "Harrison's openness to new sounds and textures cleared new paths for his rock and roll compositions. His use of dissonance on ... 'Taxman' and 'I Want to Tell You' was revolutionary in popular music – and perhaps more originally creative than the avant-garde mannerisms that Lennon and McCartney borrowed from the music of Karlheinz Stockhausen, Luciano Berio, Edgard Varèse and Igor Stravinsky ...".

Of the 1967 Harrison song "Within You Without You", author Gerry Farrell said that Harrison had created a "new form", calling the composition "a quintessential fusion of pop and Indian music". Lennon called the song one of Harrison's best: "His mind and his music are clear. There is his innate talent, he brought that sound together." In his next fully Indian-styled song, "The Inner Light", Harrison embraced the Karnatak discipline of Indian music, rather than the Hindustani style he had used in "Love You To" and "Within You Without You". Writing in 1997, Farrell commented: "It is a mark of Harrison's sincere involvement with Indian music that, nearly thirty years on, the Beatles' 'Indian' songs remain the most imaginative and successful examples of this type of fusion – for example, 'Blue Jay Way' and 'The Inner Light'."

Beatles biographer Bob Spitz described "Something" as a masterpiece, and "an intensely stirring romantic ballad that would challenge 'Yesterday' and 'Michelle' as one of the most recognizable songs they ever produced". Inglis considered Abbey Road a turning point in Harrison's development as a songwriter and musician. He described Harrison's two contributions to the LP, "Here Comes the Sun" and "Something", as "exquisite", declaring them equal to any previous Beatles songs.

=== Collaborations ===
From 1968 onwards, Harrison collaborated with other musicians; he brought in Eric Clapton to play lead guitar on "While My Guitar Gently Weeps" for the Beatles' White Album (1968), and collaborated with John Barham on his 1968 debut solo album, Wonderwall Music, which included contributions from Clapton again, as well as Peter Tork from the Monkees. He played on tracks by Dave Mason, Nicky Hopkins, Alvin Lee, Ronnie Wood, Billy Preston and Tom Scott. Harrison co-wrote songs and music with Dylan, Clapton, Preston, Doris Troy, David Bromberg, Gary Wright, Wood, Jeff Lynne and Tom Petty, among others. Harrison's music projects during the final years of the Beatles included producing Apple Records artists Doris Troy, Jackie Lomax and Billy Preston.

Harrison co-wrote the song "Badge" with Clapton, which was included on Cream's 1969 album, Goodbye. Harrison played rhythm guitar on the track, using the pseudonym "L'Angelo Misterioso" for contractual reasons. In May 1970, he played guitar on several songs during a recording session for Dylan's album New Morning. Between 1971 and 1973, he co-wrote or produced three top ten hits for Starr: "It Don't Come Easy", "Back Off Boogaloo" and "Photograph". Aside from "How Do You Sleep?", his contributions to Lennon's 1971 album Imagine included a slide guitar solo on "Gimme Some Truth" and dobro on "Crippled Inside". Also that year, he produced and played slide guitar on Badfinger's top ten hit "Day After Day", and a dobro on Preston's "I Wrote a Simple Song". (Note: Musician David Bromberg introduced Harrison to the dobro, an instrument that soon became one of his favourites.) He worked with Harry Nilsson on "You're Breakin' My Heart" (1972) and with Cheech & Chong on "Basketball Jones" (1973).

In 1974, Harrison founded Dark Horse Records as an avenue for collaboration with other musicians. He wanted Dark Horse to serve as a creative outlet for artists, as Apple Records had for the Beatles. Eric Idle commented: "He's extremely generous, and he backs and supports all sorts of people that you'll never, ever hear of." The first acts signed to the new label were Ravi Shankar and the duo Splinter. Harrison produced and made multiple musical contributions to Splinter's debut album, The Place I Love, which provided Dark Horse with its first hit, "Costafine Town". He also produced and played guitar and autoharp on Shankar's Shankar Family & Friends, the label's other inaugural release. Other artists signed by Dark Horse include Attitudes, Henry McCullough, Jiva and Stairsteps.

Harrison collaborated with Tom Scott on Scott's 1975 album New York Connection, and in 1981 he played guitar on "Walk a Thin Line", from Mick Fleetwood's The Visitor. His contributions to Starr's solo career continued with "Wrack My Brain", a 1981 US top 40 hit written and produced by Harrison, and guitar overdubs to two tracks on Vertical Man (1998). In 1996, Harrison recorded "Distance Makes No Difference With Love" with Carl Perkins for the latter's album Go Cat Go!, and, in 1990, he played slide guitar on the title track of Dylan's Under the Red Sky. In 2001, he performed as a guest musician on Jeff Lynne and Electric Light Orchestra's comeback album Zoom, and on the song "Love Letters" for Bill Wyman's Rhythm Kings. He also co-wrote a new song with his son Dhani, "Horse to the Water", which was recorded on 2 October, eight weeks before his death. It appeared on Jools Holland's album Small World, Big Band.

=== Guitars ===
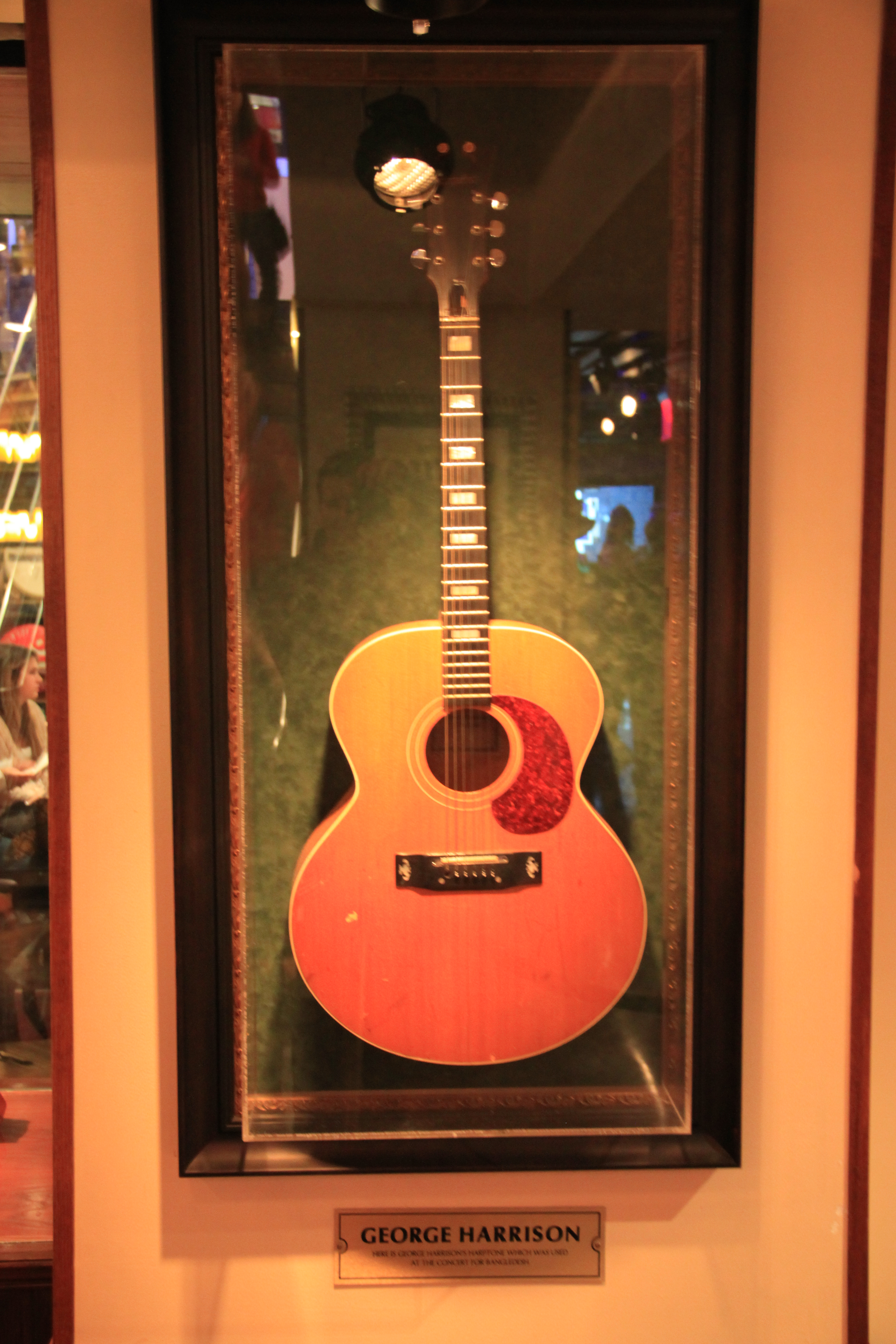
Harrison's Harptone L-6 acoustic guitar, which he played at the Concert for Bangladesh

When Harrison joined the Quarrymen in 1958, his main guitar was a Höfner President Acoustic, which he soon traded for a Höfner Club 40 model. His first solid-body electric guitar was a Czech-built Jolana Futurama/Grazioso. The guitars he used on early recordings were mainly Gretsch models, played through a Vox amplifier, including a Gretsch Duo Jet that he bought secondhand in 1961 and posed with on the album cover for Cloud Nine (1987). He also bought a Gretsch Tennessean and a Gretsch Country Gentleman, which he played on "She Loves You", and during the Beatles' 1964 appearance on The Ed Sullivan Show. In 1963, he bought a Rickenbacker 425 Fireglo, and in 1964 he acquired a Rickenbacker 360/12 guitar, which was the second of its kind to be manufactured. Harrison obtained his first Fender Stratocaster in 1965 and first used it during the recording of the Help! album that February; he also used it when recording Rubber Soul later that year, most notably on the song "Nowhere Man".

In early 1966, Harrison and Lennon each purchased Epiphone Casinos, which they used on Revolver. Harrison also used a Gibson J-160E and a Gibson SG Standard while recording the album. He later painted his Stratocaster in a psychedelic design that included the word "Bebopalula" above the pickguard and the guitar's nickname, "Rocky", on the headstock. He can be seen playing the psychedelic Stratocaster on the Our World performance of "All You Need Is Love" and in the Magical Mystery Tour film, both from 1967, and he continued to use it throughout his solo career. In July 1968, Clapton gave him a Gibson Les Paul that had been stripped of its original finish and stained cherry red, which Harrison nicknamed "Lucy". Around this time, he obtained a Gibson Jumbo J-200 acoustic guitar, which he subsequently gave to Dylan to use at the 1969 Isle of Wight Festival. In late 1968, Fender Musical Instruments Corporation gave Harrison a custom-made Fender Telecaster Rosewood prototype, made especially for him by Philip Kubicki. (Note: Harrison subsequently gave the Rosewood Telecaster to Delaney Bramlett during the 1969 Delaney & Bonnie tour. He similarly gifted his Gibson SG to Pete Ham of Badfinger.) In August 2017, Fender released a "Limited Edition George Harrison Rosewood Telecaster" modelled after a Telecaster that Roger Rossmeisl originally created for Harrison.

== Film production and HandMade films ==
Harrison helped finance Ravi Shankar's documentary Raga and released it through Apple Films in 1971. He also produced, with Apple manager Allen Klein, the Concert for Bangladesh film. In 1973, he produced the feature film Little Malcolm, but the project was lost amid the litigation surrounding the former Beatles ending their business ties with Klein.

In 1973, Peter Sellers introduced Harrison to Denis O'Brien. Soon after, the two went into business together. In 1978, to produce Monty Python's Life of Brian, they formed the film production and distribution company HandMade Films. Their opportunity for investment came after EMI Films withdrew funding at the demand of their chief executive, Bernard Delfont. Harrison financed the production of Life of Brian in part by mortgaging his home, which Idle later called "the most anybody's ever paid for a cinema ticket in history". The film grossed $21 million at the box office in the US. The first film HandMade Films distributed was The Long Good Friday (1980), and the first they produced was Time Bandits (1981), a project co-scripted by Monty Python's Terry Gilliam and Michael Palin. The film featured a new song by Harrison, "Dream Away", in the closing credits. Time Bandits became one of HandMade's most successful and acclaimed efforts; with a budget of $5 million, it earned $35 million in the US within ten weeks of its release.

Harrison served as executive producer for 23 films with HandMade, including A Private Function (1984), Mona Lisa (1986), Shanghai Surprise (1986), Withnail and I (1987) and How to Get Ahead in Advertising (1989). He made cameo appearances in several of these films, including a role as a nightclub singer in Shanghai Surprise, for which he recorded five new songs. According to Ian Inglis, "[Harrison's] executive role in HandMade Films helped to sustain British cinema at a time of crisis, producing some of the country's most memorable movies of the 1980s." Following a series of box office bombs in the late 1980s, and excessive debt incurred by O'Brien which was guaranteed by Harrison, HandMade's financial situation became precarious. The company ceased operations in 1991 and was sold three years later to Paragon Entertainment, a Canadian corporation. Afterwards, Harrison sued O'Brien for $25 million for fraud and negligence, resulting in an $11.6 million judgement in 1996.

== Humanitarian work ==
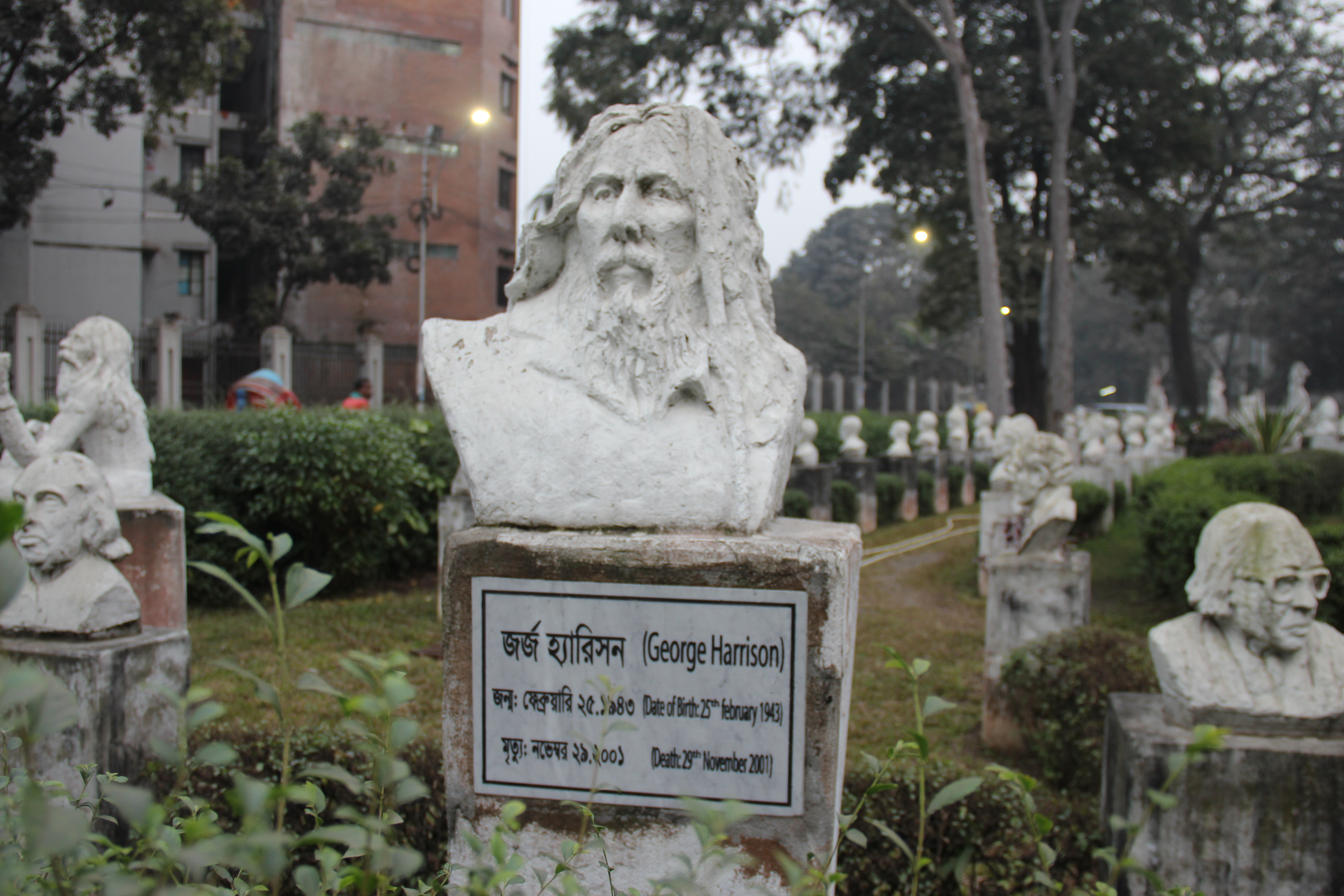
George Harrison sculpture in Dhaka, Bangladesh

Harrison was involved in humanitarian and political activism throughout his life. In the 1960s, the Beatles supported the civil rights movement and protested against the Vietnam War. In early 1971, Ravi Shankar consulted Harrison about how to provide aid to the people of Bangladesh after the 1970 Bhola cyclone and the Bangladesh Liberation War. Harrison hastily wrote and recorded the song "Bangla Desh", which became pop music's first charity single when issued by Apple Records in late July. He also pushed Apple to release Shankar's Joi Bangla EP in an effort to raise further awareness for the cause. Shankar asked for Harrison's advice about planning a small charity event in the US. Harrison responded by organising the Concert for Bangladesh, which raised more than $240,000. Around $13.5 million was generated through the album and film releases, although most of the funds were frozen in an Internal Revenue Service audit for ten years, due to Klein's failure to register the event as a UNICEF benefit beforehand. In June 1972, UNICEF honoured Harrison, Shankar, and Klein, with the "Child Is the Father of Man" award at an annual ceremony in recognition of their fundraising efforts for Bangladesh.

From 1980, Harrison became a vocal supporter of Greenpeace and CND. He also protested against the use of nuclear energy with Friends of the Earth, and helped finance Vole, a green magazine launched by Monty Python's Terry Jones. (Note: In 1985, Harrison contributed a new version of his Somewhere in England track "Save the World" to the fundraising compilation Greenpeace – The Album.) In 1990, he helped promote his wife Olivia's Romanian Angel Appeal on behalf of the thousands of Romanian orphans left abandoned by the state following the fall of Communism in Eastern Europe. Harrison recorded a benefit single, "Nobody's Child", with the Traveling Wilburys, and assembled a fundraising album with contributions from other artists including Clapton, Starr, Elton John, Stevie Wonder, Donovan and Van Morrison.

The Concert for Bangladesh has been described as an innovative precursor for the large-scale charity rock shows that followed, including Live Aid. The George Harrison Humanitarian Fund for UNICEF, a joint effort between the Harrison family and the US Fund for UNICEF, aims to support programmes that help children caught in humanitarian emergencies. In December 2007, they donated $450,000 to help the victims of Cyclone Sidr in Bangladesh. On 13 October 2009, the first George Harrison Humanitarian Award went to Ravi Shankar for his efforts in saving the lives of children, and his involvement with the Concert for Bangladesh.

== Personal life ==
=== Hinduism ===
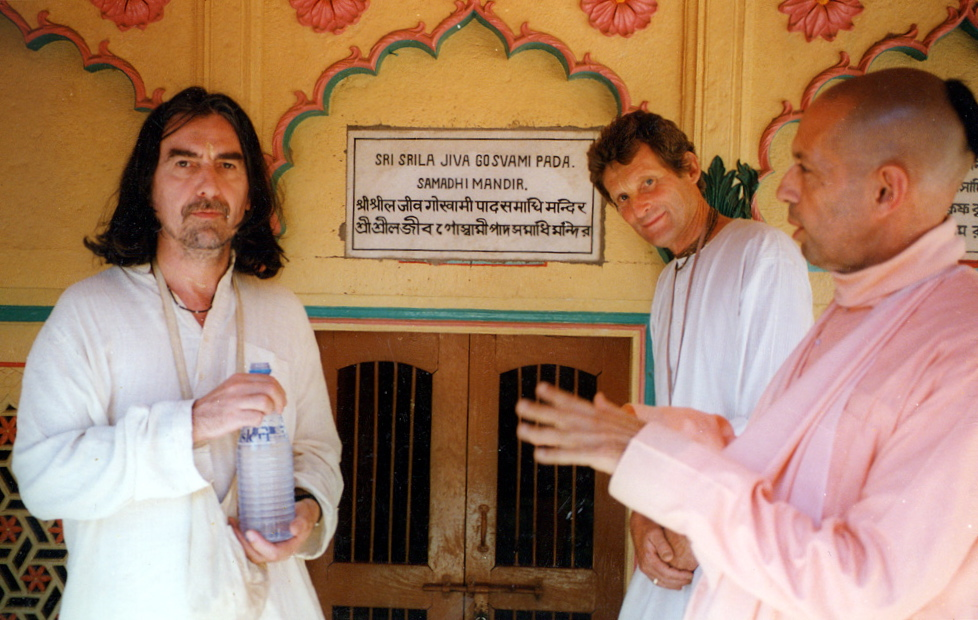
Harrison, with Hare Krishna devotees Shyamasundar Das and Mukunda Goswami, in Vrindavan, India, in 1996

By the mid-1960s, Harrison had become an admirer of Indian culture and mysticism, introducing it to the other Beatles. During the filming of Help! in the Bahamas, they met the founder of Sivananda Yoga, Swami Vishnu-devananda, who gave each of them a signed copy of his book, The Complete Illustrated Book of Yoga (1960). Between the end of the last Beatles tour in 1966 and the beginning of the Sgt Pepper recording sessions, he made a pilgrimage to India with his first wife, Pattie Boyd; there, he studied sitar with Ravi Shankar, met several gurus, and visited various holy places. In 1968, he travelled with the other Beatles to Rishikesh in northern India to study meditation with Maharishi Mahesh Yogi. (Note: Harrison credited English sculptor David Wynne as the person who first recommended the Mararishi as a "remarkable" yogi, after which the Beatles attended a lecture he gave in London in August 1967.)

Harrison's experiences with LSD in the mid-1960s served as a catalyst for his early pursuance of Hinduism. In a 1977 interview, George recalled:

For me, it was like a flash. The first time I had acid, it just opened up something in my head that was inside of me, and I realized a lot of things. I didn't learn them because I already knew them, but that happened to be the key that opened the door to reveal them. From the moment I had that, I wanted to have it all the time – these thoughts about the yogis and the Himalayas, and Ravi's music.

However, Harrison stopped using LSD after a disenchanting experience in San Francisco's Haight-Ashbury neighborhood. He recounted in The Beatles Anthology:

That was the turning point for me – that's when I went right off the whole drug cult and stopped taking the dreaded lysergic acid. I had some in a little bottle – it was liquid. I put it under a microscope, and it looked like bits of old rope. I thought that I couldn't put that into my brain any more.

After being given various religious texts by Shankar in 1966, he remained a lifelong advocate of the teachings of Swami Vivekananda and Paramahansa Yogananda – yogis and authors, respectively, of Raja Yoga (1896) and Autobiography of a Yogi (1946). In mid-1969, he produced the single "Hare Krishna Mantra", performed by members of the London Radha Krishna Temple. Having also helped the Temple devotees become established in Britain, Harrison then met their leader, A. C. Bhaktivedanta Swami Prabhupada, whom he described as "my friend ... my master" and "a perfect example of everything he preached". Harrison embraced the Hare Krishna tradition, particularly japa-yoga chanting with beads, and became a lifelong devotee. In 1972 he donated his Letchmore Heath mansion north of London to the devotees. It was later converted to a temple and renamed Bhaktivedanta Manor.

Regarding other faiths, he once remarked: "All religions are branches of one big tree. It doesn't matter what you call Him just as long as you call." He commented on his beliefs:

Krishna actually was in a body as a person ... What makes it complicated is, if he's God, what's he doing fighting on a battlefield? It took me ages to try to figure that out, and again it was Yogananda's spiritual interpretation of the Bhagavad Gita that made me realise what it was. Our idea of Krishna and Arjuna on the battlefield in the chariot. So this is the point – that we're in these bodies, which is like a kind of chariot, and we're going through this incarnation, this life, which is kind of a battlefield. The senses of the body ... are the horses pulling the chariot, and we have to get control over the chariot by getting control over the reins. And Arjuna in the end says, "Please Krishna, you drive the chariot" because unless we bring Christ or Krishna or Buddha or whichever of our spiritual guides ... we're going to crash our chariot, and we're going to turn over, and we're going to get killed in the battlefield. That's why we say "Hare Krishna, Hare Krishna", asking Krishna to come and take over the chariot.

Inglis comments that, in contrast to Cliff Richard's conversion to Christianity in 1966: "Harrison's spiritual journey was seen as a serious and important development that reflected popular music's increasing maturity ... what he, and the Beatles, had managed to overturn was the paternalistic assumption that popular musicians had no role other than to stand on stage and sing their hit songs."

==== Vegetarianism ====
In line with the Hindu yoga tradition, Harrison became a vegetarian in the late 1960s. He remained a vegetarian on religious grounds from 1968 until his death, and spent the second half of his life as an advocate for the benefits of vegetarianism.

=== Family and interests ===
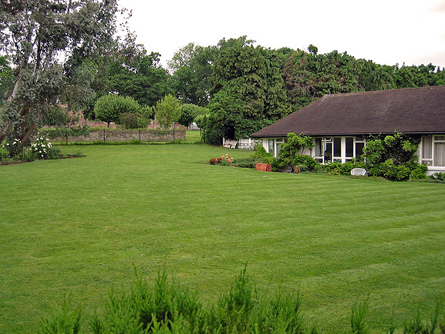
Harrison and Pattie Boyd lived in Kinfauns in Surrey from 1964 to 1970.

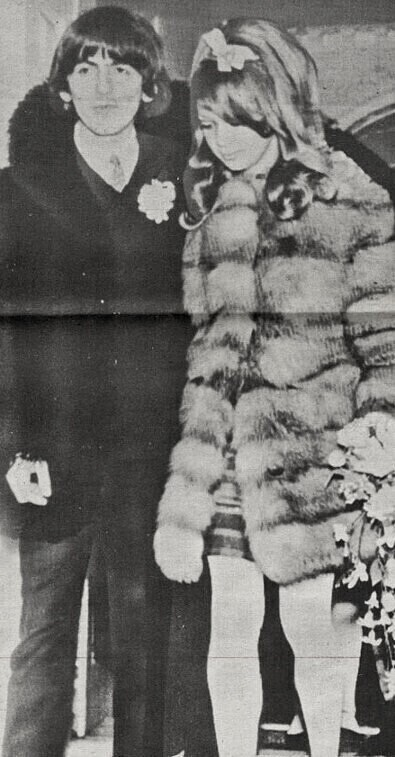
Harrison and Boyd leaving the registry office after their wedding

Harrison married model Pattie Boyd on 21 January 1966, with McCartney serving as best man. Harrison and Boyd had met on set in 1964 during the production of the film A Hard Day's Night, in which the 19-year-old Boyd had been cast as a schoolgirl. During a lunch break, George 'playfully' proposed to her. They separated in 1974 and their divorce was finalised in 1977. Boyd said her decision to end the marriage was due largely to George's repeated infidelities. The last infidelity culminated in an affair with Ringo's wife Maureen, which Boyd called "the final straw". She characterised the last year of their marriage as "fuelled by alcohol and cocaine", and she stated: "George used coke excessively, and I think it changed him ... it froze his emotions and hardened his heart." She subsequently moved in with Eric Clapton, and they married in 1979. (Note: Harrison had formed a close friendship with Clapton in the late 1960s; he wrote one of his compositions for the Abbey Road album, "Here Comes the Sun", in Clapton's back garden, and he played guitar on Cream's song "Badge", which he co-wrote with Clapton.)

On 2 September 1978, Harrison married Olivia Trinidad Arias, who was a marketing executive for A&M Records, and later Dark Horse Records. As Dark Horse was a subsidiary of A&M, the couple had first met over the phone working on record company business, and then in person at the A&M Records offices in Los Angeles in 1974. Together they had one son, Dhani Harrison, born on 1 August 1978.

Harrison restored the English manor house and grounds of Friar Park, his home in Henley-on-Thames, where several of his music videos, including "Crackerbox Palace", were filmed; the grounds also served as the background for the cover of All Things Must Pass. (Note: The house had once belonged to the Victorian eccentric Sir Frank Crisp. Purchased in 1970, it is the basis for the song "Ballad of Sir Frankie Crisp (Let It Roll)". Harrison also owned homes on Hamilton Island, Australia, and in Nahiku, Hawaii.) He employed ten workers to maintain the 36-acre (15 ha) garden. Harrison commented on gardening as a form of escapism: "Sometimes I feel like I'm actually on the wrong planet, and it's great when I'm in my garden, but the minute I go out the gate I think: 'What the hell am I doing here?'" His autobiography, I, Me, Mine, is dedicated "to gardeners everywhere". The former Beatles publicist Derek Taylor helped Harrison write the book, which said little about the Beatles, focusing instead on Harrison's hobbies, music and lyrics. Taylor commented: "George is not disowning the Beatles ... but it was a long time ago and actually a short part of his life."

Harrison had an interest in sports cars and motor racing; he was one of the 100 people who purchased the McLaren F1 road car. He had collected photos of racing drivers and their cars since he was young; at 12, he had attended his first race, the 1955 British Grand Prix at Aintree. He wrote "Faster" as a tribute to the Formula One racing drivers Jackie Stewart and Ronnie Peterson. Proceeds from its release went to the Gunnar Nilsson cancer charity, set up after the Swedish driver's death from the disease in 1978. Harrison's first extravagant car, a 1964 Aston Martin DB5, was sold at auction on 7 December 2011 in London. An anonymous Beatles collector paid £350,000 for the vehicle that Harrison had bought new in January 1965.

=== Relationships with the other Beatles ===
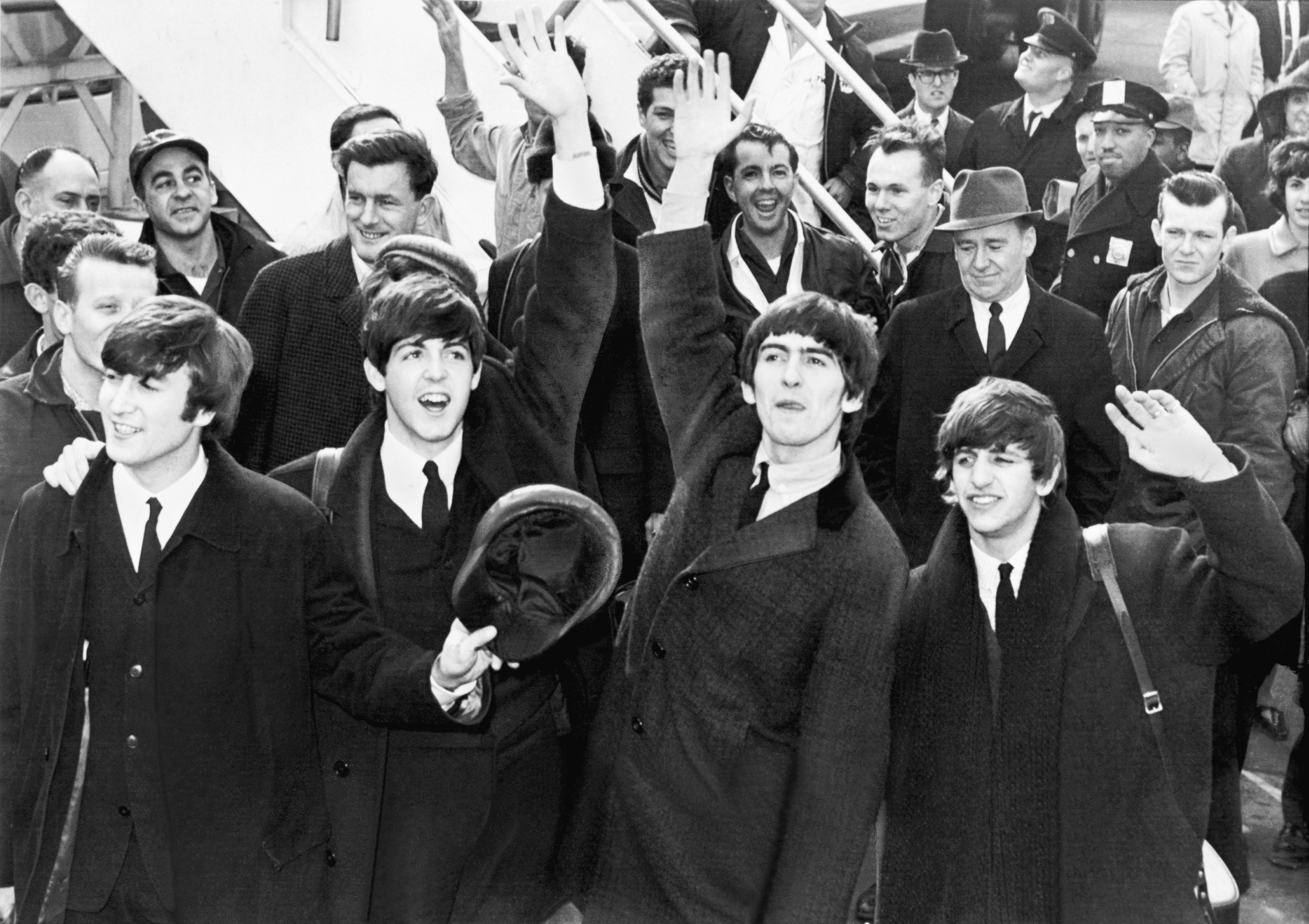
Lennon, McCartney, Harrison and Starr on arrival in New York City at the height of Beatlemania, February 1964

For most of the Beatles' career, the relationships in the group were close. According to Hunter Davies, "the Beatles spent their lives not living a communal life, but communally living the same life. They were each other's greatest friends." Harrison's ex-wife Pattie Boyd described how the Beatles "all belonged to each other" and admitted, "George has a lot with the others that I can never know about. Nobody, not even the wives, can break through or even comprehend it." Starr said, "We really looked out for each other and we had so many laughs together. In the old days we'd have the biggest hotel suites, the whole floor of the hotel, and the four of us would end up in the bathroom, just to be with each other." He added, "there were some really loving, caring moments between four people: a hotel room here and there – a really amazing closeness. Just four guys who loved each other. It was pretty sensational."

Lennon stated that his relationship with Harrison was "one of young follower and older guy ... [he] was like a disciple of mine when we started." The two later bonded over their LSD experiences, finding common ground as seekers of spirituality. They took radically different paths thereafter, with, according to biographer Gary Tillery, Harrison finding God and Lennon coming to the conclusion that people are the creators of their own lives. In 1974, Harrison said of his former bandmate: "John Lennon is a saint and he's heavy-duty, and he's great and I love him. But at the same time, he's such a bastard – but that's the great thing about him, you see?"

Harrison and McCartney were the first of the Beatles to meet, having shared a school bus, and often learned and rehearsed new guitar chords together. McCartney said that he and Harrison usually shared a bedroom while touring. McCartney has referred to Harrison as his "baby brother". In a 1974 BBC radio interview with Alan Freeman, Harrison stated: "[McCartney] ruined me as a guitar player". In the same interview, however, Harrison stated that "I just know that whatever we've been through, there's always been something that's tied us together." Perhaps the most significant obstacle to a Beatles reunion after the death of Lennon was Harrison and McCartney's personal relationship, as both men admitted that they often got on each other's nerves. Rodriguez commented: "Even to the end of George's days, theirs was a volatile relationship". When, in a Yahoo online chat in February 2001, he was asked if Paul "[pisses] you off", Harrison replied "Scan not a friend with a microscopic glass – You know his faults – Then let his foibles pass. Old Victorian Proverb. I'm sure there's enough about me that pisses him off, but I think we have now grown old enough to realize that we're both pretty damn cute!"

== Legacy ==
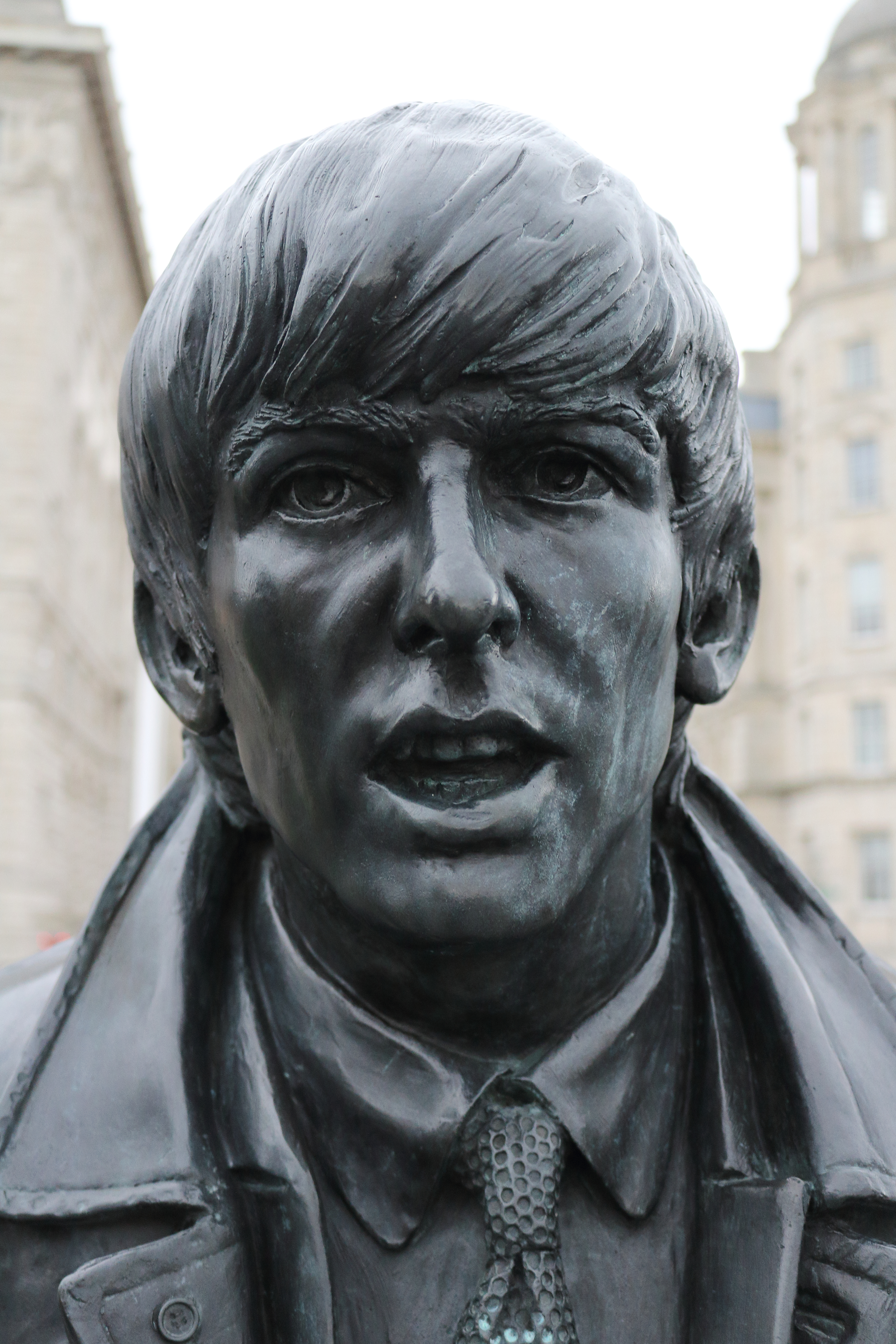
Close-up of Harrison from the Beatles statue at Pier Head, Liverpool

In June 1965, Harrison and the other Beatles were appointed Members of the Order of the British Empire (MBE). They received their insignia from the Queen at an investiture at Buckingham Palace on 26 October. In 1971, the Beatles received an Academy Award for the best Original Song Score for the film Let It Be. The minor planet 4149 Harrison, discovered in 1984, was named after him, as was a variety of Dahlia flower. In December 1992, he became the first recipient of the Billboard Century Award, an honour presented to music artists for significant bodies of work. The award recognised Harrison's "critical role in laying the groundwork for the modern concept of world music" and for his having "advanced society's comprehension of the spiritual and altruistic power of popular music". Rolling Stone ranked him number 11 on their list of the "100 Greatest Guitarists" and number 65 on their list of "100 Greatest Songwriters".

In 2002, on the first anniversary of his death, the Concert for George was held at the Royal Albert Hall. Eric Clapton organised the event, which included performances by many of Harrison's friends and musical collaborators, including McCartney and Starr. Eric Idle, who described Harrison as "one of the few morally good people that rock and roll has produced", was among the performers of Monty Python's "Lumberjack Song". The profits from the concert went to Harrison's charity, the Material World Charitable Foundation.

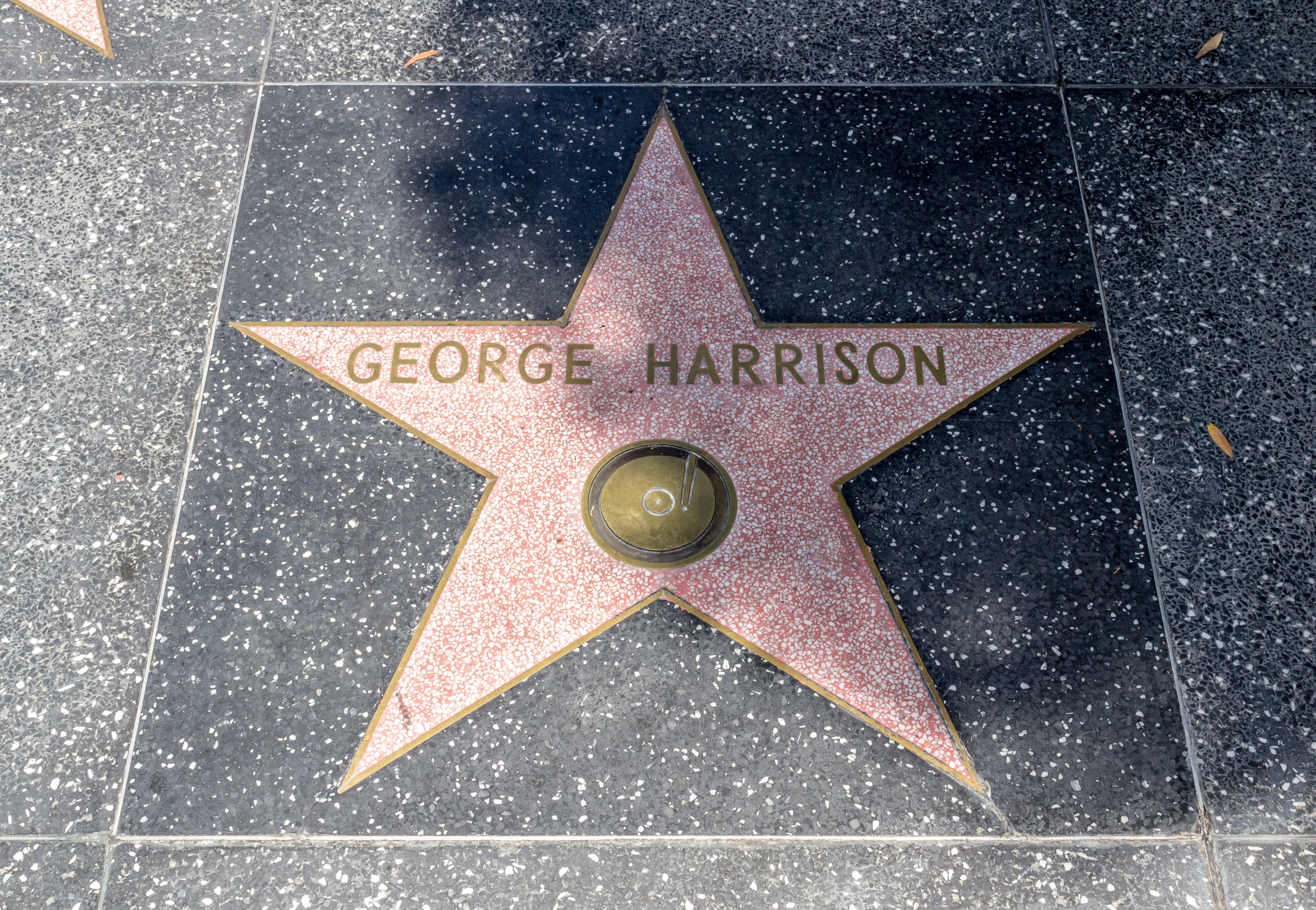
"George Harrison" star on the Hollywood Walk of Fame in Los Angeles

In 2004, Harrison was posthumously inducted into the Rock and Roll Hall of Fame as a solo artist by his fellow Wilburys Lynne and Petty, and into the Madison Square Garden Walk of Fame in 2006 for the Concert for Bangladesh. On 14 April 2009, the Hollywood Chamber of Commerce awarded Harrison a star on the Walk of Fame in front of the Capitol Records Building. McCartney, Lynne and Petty were present when the star was unveiled. Harrison's widow Olivia, the actor Tom Hanks and Idle made speeches at the ceremony, and Harrison's son Dhani spoke the Hare Krishna mantra.

Martin Scorsese's documentary, George Harrison: Living in the Material World, was released in October 2011. The film features interviews with Olivia and Dhani Harrison, Klaus Voormann, Terry Gilliam, Starr, Clapton, McCartney, Keltner and Astrid Kirchherr.

Harrison was posthumously honoured with The Recording Academy's Grammy Lifetime Achievement Award at the Grammy Awards in February 2015.

An Illinois State Historical Society marker in Benton, Illinois, commemorates Harrison's visit in the town in 1963 to see his sister, making him the first Beatle to visit the United States. In 2017, Benton unveiled a commemorative mural along southbound I-57, painted and donated by artist John Cerney. Statues of Harrison can be found around the world, including several across his native Liverpool and a bust in the Shadhinotar Shagram Triangle Sculpture Garden in Dhaka, Bangladesh, commemorating Harrison's contributions to Bangladeshi culture.

On 24 May 2024 a blue plaque from Historic England was unveiled at Harrison's childhood home at 12 Arnold Grove in Wavertree as part of the national blue plaques scheme. He voiced himself in The Simpsons episode "Homer's Barbershop Quartet", a spoof of the Beatles. Upon seeing Homer's band, Harrison says "It's been done."

== Discography ==
=== Studio albums ===
- Wonderwall Music (1968)
- Electronic Sound (1969)
- All Things Must Pass (1970)
- Living in the Material World (1973)
- Dark Horse (1974)
- Extra Texture (Read All About It) (1975)
- Thirty Three & 1/3 (1976)
- George Harrison (1979)
- Somewhere in England (1981)
- Gone Troppo (1982)
- Cloud Nine (1987)
- Brainwashed (2002)

== See also ==
- Outline of the Beatles
- The Beatles timeline
- Cultural impact of the Beatles
- List of British Grammy Award winners and nominees
- List of peace activists
