= Qomolangma (disambiguation) =

Qomolangma, Chomolungma, or Chomolangma is the Tibetan name for Mount Everest.

It may also refer to:

- Qomolangma National Nature Preserve, a protected area in the Tibet Autonomous Region of China.
- Qomolangma National Park, a national park located in Xigazê Prefecture, Tibet Autonomous Region, China

== See also ==
- Mount Everest (disambiguation)
