= Sagarmatha (disambiguation) =

Sagarmatha is the Nepalese name for Mount Everest.

It may also refer to:

- Sagarmatha Zone, former administrative division of Nepal
- Sagarmatha National Park, in Nepal, near Mount Everest
- Radio Sagarmatha, community radio in Kathmandu, Nepal
- Sagarmatha Highway, east-west highway in Nepal
- Sagarmatha Airport, in eastern Nepal
- Sagarmatha (album), an album by the Appleseed Cast
- Sagarmatha, official name of star HD 100777 in the constellation Leo

== See also ==
- Mount Everest (disambiguation)
