= Everest (cigarette) =

Cigarette brand

- Product type: Cigarette
- Produced by: British American Tobacco Zimbabwe Holdings
- Country: Zimbabwe
- Introduced: 1960s
- Markets: Zimbabwe, United Kingdom, Belgium, The Netherlands, South Africa, Vietnam

Everest cigarette is a brand of cigarettes, currently owned and manufactured by British American Tobacco Zimbabwe Holdings.

== History ==
Everest cigarettes were launched in the 1960s and are popular in the Zimbabwean cigarette market. During the recording of Abbey Road, a 1969 album by The Beatles, audio engineer Geoff Emerick used to smoke Everests. The band liked the visual imagery of the packet and chose Everest as a working title for the album.

The brand is mainly sold in Zimbabwe, but also was or still is sold in the United Kingdom, Belgium, The Netherlands, South Africa and Vietnam.

Various advertising posters were also made.

== Abbey Road album name ==
Abbey Road is the eleventh studio album by English rock band the Beatles and was released on 26 September 1969. Geoff Emerick, the band's audio engineer, used to smoke Everest cigarettes and hence the group had decided to name the album after the brand of cigarette and title it either Mount Everest, Everest or Ever Rest (since packets had a silhouette of Mount Everest on them and the Beatles liked the imagery). Originally the band intended to take a private plane over to the Himalayas to shoot a photograph of Mount Everest for the album cover. The group, however, did not want to undertake the long trip and travel to Mount Everest for the photo shoot.

It was around July, when it was very hot outside, that someone mentioned the possibility of the four of them taking a private plane over to the foothills of Mount Everest to shoot the cover photograph. But as they became more enthusiastic to finish the LP someone – I don't remember whom – suggested, 'Look, I can't be bothered to schlep all the way over to the Himalayas for a cover, why don't we just go outside, take the photo there, call the LP Abbey Road and have done with it?' That's my memory of why it became Abbey Road: because they couldn't be bothered to go to Tibet and get cold!

— John Kurlander quoted in book "The Beatles Recording Sessions" by Mark Lewisohn (The Official Abbey Road Studios Session Notes 1962-1970),

== Smuggling ==
In 2009, contraband cigarettes worth 3.1 million US Dollars were intercepted in Botswana. The cigarettes were smuggled from Zimbabwe and were to be smuggled into Asian countries such as China and India. Botswana police found 108 boxes with 54 000 cartons of Derby cigarettes, 133 boxes containing 66 500 cartons of Pacific cigarettes, and 128 boxes containing 64 000 cartons of Sevilles cigarettes. Adam Molai, executive chairman of Savanna Tobacco, the manufacturer of Pacific and Derby cigarettes, professed ignorance on the smuggling of his company’s brands. He said the following about it: "As recently as last year our Pacific brand, like all other established brands, fell victim to counterfeiters in South Africa. Should you go to the informal markets in Botswana, Zambia and South Africa you will find large volumes of Madison, Kingsgate or Everest. These cigarettes are not exported by BAT Zimbabwe, but still end up on the market in Botswana, South Africa, and Zambia."

== See also ==
- Tobacco smoking
