= The Beatles in India =

1968 visit to India by the Beatles

Group photo, February 1968. Seated in front of Maharishi Mahesh Yogi, from left: Ringo Starr, Maureen Starkey, Jane Asher, Paul McCartney, George Harrison, Pattie Boyd, Cynthia Lennon, John Lennon and Mal Evans

In February 1968, the English rock band the Beatles travelled to Rishikesh in northern India to take part in a Transcendental Meditation (TM) training course at the ashram of Maharishi Mahesh Yogi. The visit followed the Beatles' denunciation of drugs in favour of TM and received widespread media attention. The band's interest in the Maharishi's teachings was led by George Harrison's commitment. The visit influenced Western attitudes about Indian spirituality and encouraged the study of TM. It was also the most productive period for the Beatles' songwriting.

The Beatles had intended to join the Maharishi in India soon after attending his seminar in Bangor, Wales in late August 1967. Their attendance was cut short by the death of their manager Brian Epstein, after which they committed to making the television film Magical Mystery Tour. Harrison and John Lennon were convinced of the merits of TM and became spokesmen for the Maharishi's Spiritual Regeneration Movement, as he gained international prominence as the guru to the Beatles. The band members arrived in India in mid-February 1968, along with their wives, girlfriends, assistants, and numerous reporters. They joined a group of 60 training to be TM teachers; among the other celebrity meditators were musicians Donovan, Mike Love and Paul Horn, and actress Mia Farrow. While there, Lennon, Paul McCartney and Harrison wrote many songs, and Ringo Starr finished writing his first. Eighteen were recorded for The Beatles ("the White Album"), two others appeared on the Abbey Road album, and others were used for various solo projects.

The retreat and the discipline required for meditation were met with varying degrees of commitment from the individual Beatles. Starr left on 1 March, after ten days; McCartney left later in March to attend to business concerns. Harrison and Lennon departed abruptly on 12 April following rumours of the Maharishi's inappropriate behaviour towards Farrow and another of his female students. The divisive influence of the Beatles' Greek friend Alexis Mardas, financial disagreements, and suspicions that their teacher was taking advantage of the band's fame have also been cited by biographers and witnesses.

The Beatles' denunciation of the Maharishi was detrimental to his reputation in the West, while their return from Rishikesh exposed differences that anticipated the group's break-up in 1970. Harrison later apologised for the way that he and Lennon had treated the Maharishi; like many of the students at the ashram, he acknowledged that allegations concerning the Maharishi's inappropriate behaviour were untrue. Harrison gave a benefit concert in 1992 for the Maharishi-associated Natural Law Party. In 2009, McCartney and Starr performed at a benefit concert for the David Lynch Foundation, which raises funds for teaching TM to at-risk students. As a result of continued interest in the Beatles' 1968 retreat, the abandoned ashram was opened to the public in 2015 and has since been renamed Beatles Ashram.

== Background ==
Location of the ashram (now known as Beatles Ashram) in Rishikesh, where the Beatles studied Transcendental Meditation with Maharishi Mahesh Yogi between February and April 1968

The Beatles attended Maharishi Mahesh Yogi's Transcendental Meditation (TM) seminar in Bangor in Wales, but their stay was cut short on 27 August 1967 after they learned that their manager, Brian Epstein, had been found dead in his London home. Eager to explore meditation further, the Beatles made plans to travel to the Maharishi's training centre in Rishikesh, India, in late October. At Paul McCartney's urging, they postponed the trip until the new year to work on their Magical Mystery Tour film project, since he was concerned that, with the loss of Epstein, the band should first focus on their career. George Harrison and John Lennon, the two most committed to the Maharishi's teachings, appeared twice on David Frost's television program in autumn 1967 to espouse the benefits of TM.

Now publicised as "the Beatles' Guru", the Maharishi went on his eighth world tour, giving lectures in Britain, Scandinavia, West Germany, Italy, Canada and California. Harrison introduced Dennis Wilson of the Beach Boys to the Maharishi when he and Lennon joined their teacher at a UNICEF benefit in Paris in December. Wilson's bandmate Mike Love described the private lecture the Maharishi gave beforehand as "awe-inspiring" and "the most profound experience I'd ever felt". (Note: Love added: "And the process of meditation was so simple, yet so powerful. It seemed obvious that if everyone did it, it would be an entirely different world out there – relaxed and peaceful.") Having long shared Harrison's interest in meditation and Indian religious texts, Scottish singer Donovan also recognised the Maharishi as the "guide" they had been searching for.

The Maharishi received considerable media coverage in the West, particularly the United States, where Life devoted a cover article to TM and declared 1968 the "Year of the Guru". The mainstream press remained largely suspicious of the Maharishi's motives, however; the British satirical magazine Private Eye nicknamed him "Veririchi Lotsamoney Yogi Bear". Lennon defended the Maharishi's requirement that his students donate a week's wages to his organisation, the Spiritual Regeneration Movement, saying that it was "the fairest thing I've heard of". Lennon added: "So what if he's commercial? We're the most commercial group in the world!" The Beatles were nevertheless concerned that the Maharishi appeared to be using their name for self-promotion. According to Peter Brown, who temporarily assumed Epstein's role following his death, the Maharishi was negotiating with ABC in the US to make a television special featuring the band. In an effort to stop him, Brown twice visited the Maharishi in Malmö, Sweden – on the second occasion with Harrison and McCartney – only for him to "giggle" in response. In Brown's description, Harrison defended their teacher, saying: "He's not a modern man. He just doesn't understand these things."

Harrison flew to Bombay in January 1968 to work on the Wonderwall Music soundtrack, expecting the rest of the group to follow shortly. When they were delayed he flew back to London. The group spent a week in the studio, recording songs for a single that would be released while they were away on their spiritual retreat. The B-side, Harrison's "The Inner Light", was mostly recorded in Bombay and featured Indian instrumentation and lyrics espousing meditation as a means to genuine understanding of the world. Although it remained unreleased until late 1969, Lennon's "Across the Universe" contained the refrain "Jai Guru Deva", a standard greeting in the Spiritual Regeneration Movement. Aside from the celebrity musicians who now endorsed TM, the Maharishi had gained the support of American film star Mia Farrow while in New York City. In late January, amid the publicity surrounding her separation from her husband, Frank Sinatra, Farrow accompanied the Maharishi to India in advance of the Beatles' departure from London.

== Arrivals ==
It hadn't seemed very long ago that John Lennon had declared, casually, but catastrophically, that religious disciples were "thick and ordinary". Now, in mid-February 1968, a stunned world looked on as pop's reluctant anti-Christs found themselves chasing a self-proclaimed guru halfway across the globe in search of spiritual guidance.

— Author and journalist Mark Paytress, 2003

The Beatles and their entourage travelled to Rishikesh in two groups. Lennon and his wife, Cynthia, Harrison and his wife, Pattie Boyd, and Boyd's sister Jenny arrived in Delhi on 15 February. They were met by Mal Evans, their longtime assistant and former road manager, who had arranged the 150-mile (240 km), six-hour taxi drive to Rishikesh. Once there, the party walked across the Lakshman Jhula footbridge, over the River Ganges, and up the hill to the Maharishi's ashram. McCartney and his girlfriend Jane Asher and Ringo Starr and his wife Maureen landed in Delhi on 19 February. Since the press were expecting McCartney and Starr's party after the first group's arrival, they were subjected to constant attention. As soon as Starr arrived, he asked Evans to take him to a doctor because of a reaction to an inoculation. As a result, Starr, McCartney and their partners stayed overnight in Delhi and travelled to Rishikesh with Evans early on 20 February.

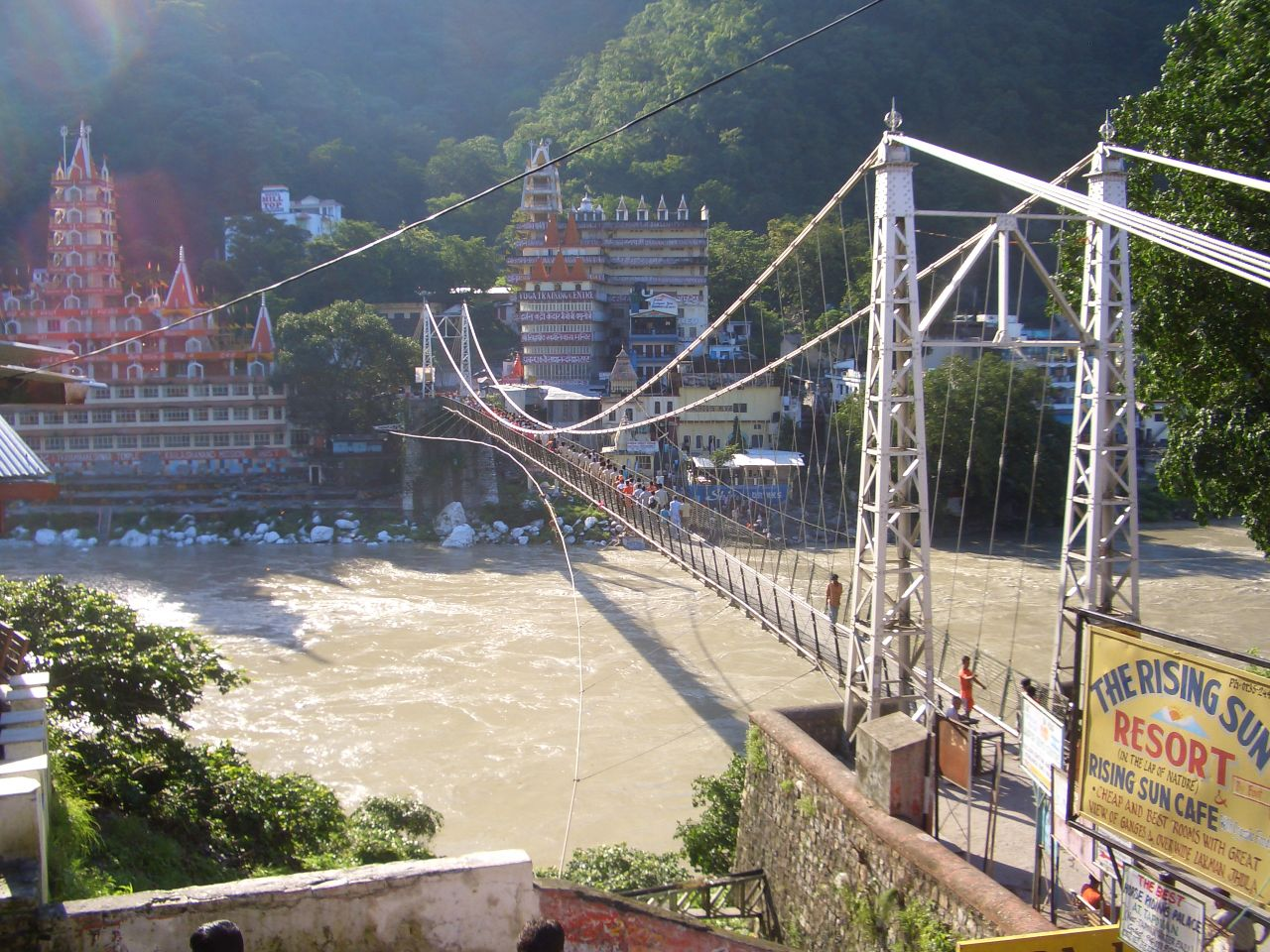
The Lakshman Jhula suspension bridge over the River Ganges

The Beatles arrived at the ashram three weeks into the course, which was due to end on 25 April. They were followed by a retinue of reporters and photographers, who were mostly kept out of the fenced and gated compound. Evans and Beatles aide Neil Aspinall were there for much of the time. Alexis "Magic Alex" Mardas, the Greek electronics engineer who had been among the first to recommend the Maharishi to the band in 1967, arrived four weeks later. Denis O'Dell, the head of the Beatles' company Apple Films, also joined them for a brief time. In his memoir The Love You Make, Brown says that he only learned of the Beatles' intention to leave for India that same month, even though he and the band were committed to launching their multimedia company Apple Corps. He adds: "The mastery of Transcendental Meditation, they hoped, would give them the wisdom to run Apple."

Also there were Donovan, songwriter and sculptor Gyp "Gypsy Dave" Mills, Mike Love, jazz flautist Paul Horn, actors Tom Simcox and Jerry Stovin, and dozens of others, all Europeans or Americans. Farrow was joined by her sister, Prudence, and their brother John. American socialite Nancy Cooke de Herrera was also present, in her role as the Maharishi's publicist and confidant. (Note: At the time, she was married to Morton "Tony" Jackson, a news analyst, and was referred to as Nancy Jackson.) A lifelong devotee to TM and subsequently an instructor to many celebrities, Cooke de Herrara later wrote that the Maharishi gave "special attention" to the celebrity meditators, which she feared would feed their egos and be detrimental to the experience. Although members of the press were barred from the ashram, journalist Lewis Lapham was granted access to write a feature article on the retreat for The Saturday Evening Post. (Note: Lapham was not permitted to probe the Beatles with personal questions, however. Apart from his own observations, much of the information he gleaned about the proceedings came from the other students there.) Paul Saltzman, a young Canadian filmmaker travelling in India, camped outside the compound until he was invited in and welcomed into the Beatles' circle. Despite speculation, Shirley MacLaine did not attend the retreat, and Lennon decided against bringing his artist friend Yoko Ono.

== Facility ==
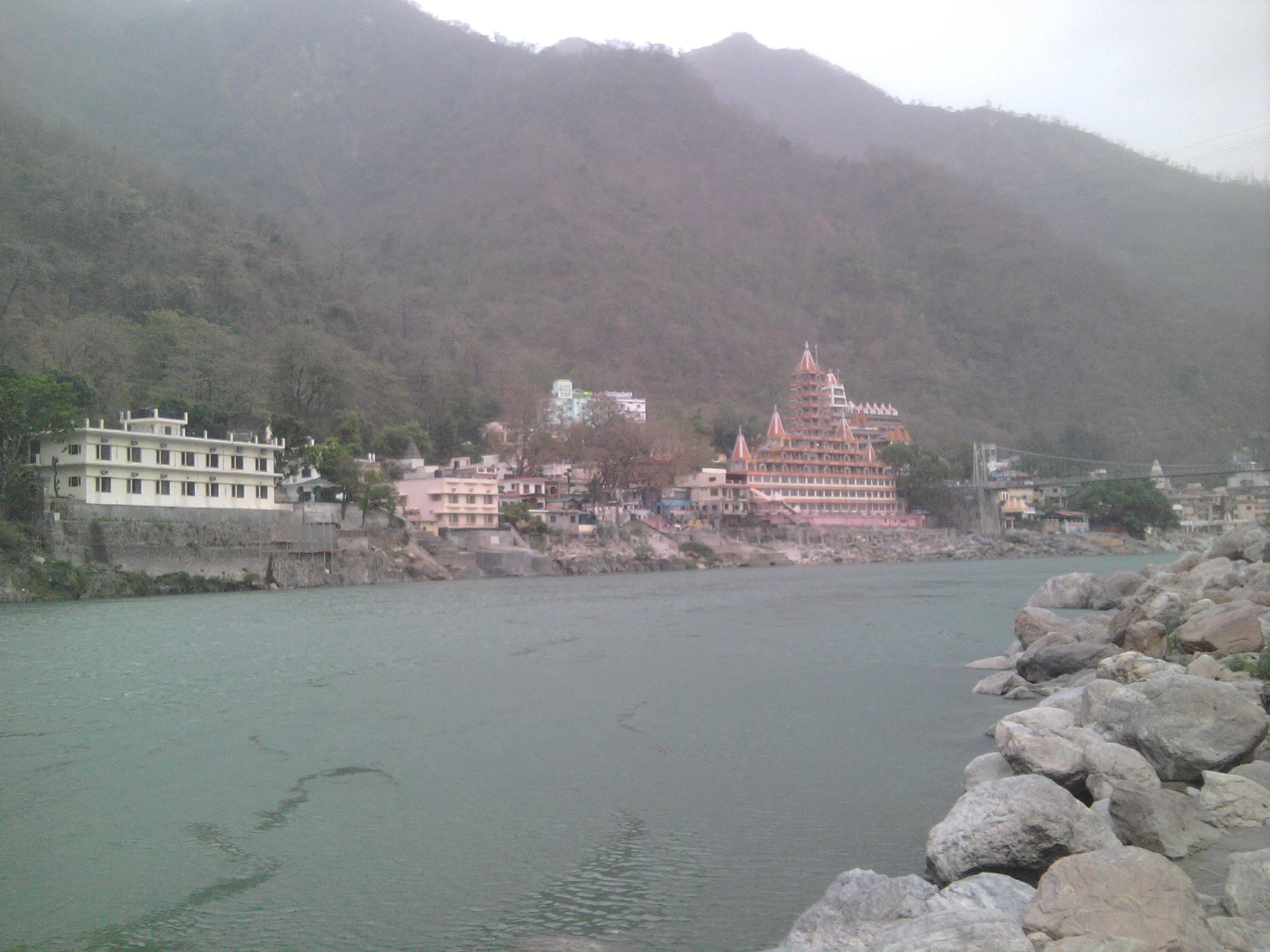
View of Rishikesh from Ganga river bank

Located in the "Valley of the Saints" in the foothills of the Himalayas, Rishikesh is a place of religious significance, known as the "yoga capital of the world". The Maharishi's International Academy of Meditation, also called the Chaurasi Kutia ashram, was a 14-acre (57,000 m^{2}) compound surrounded by jungle set across the Ganges from the town, 150 feet (46 m) above the river. The facility was designed to suit Western habits; Starr later compared the ashram to "a kind of spiritual Butlins" (a low-cost British holiday camp). The Beatles' bungalows were equipped with electric heaters, running water, toilets, and English-style furniture. According to Cooke de Herrera, the Maharishi obtained many "special items" from a nearby village so that the Beatles' rooms would have mirrors, wall-to-wall carpeting, wall coverings, foam mattresses and bedspreads. She wrote that, compared to the other students' bungalows, the Beatles' cottages "looked like a palace". In Cynthia Lennon's description, her and her husband's bedroom contained a four-poster bed, a dressing table, two chairs and an electric heater.

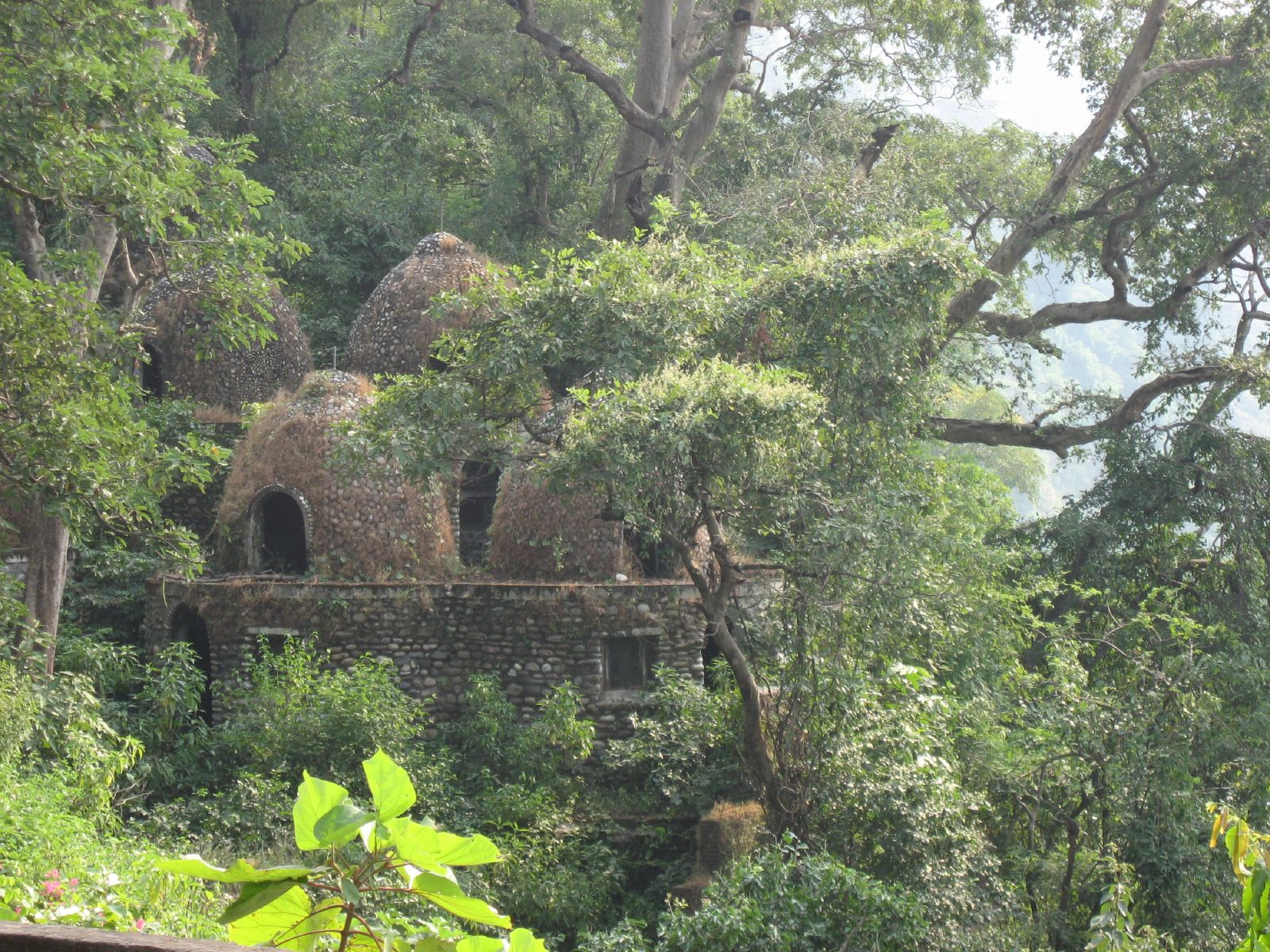
Meditation domes at the International Academy of Meditation (pictured in 2006, long after the ashram's closure)

Evans recalled there were around 40 staff, including cooks, cleaners, a joiner, and a full printing department. One of the Maharishi's aides, Ravindra Damodara, who later became a swami himself, kept a diary of this period at the ashram. (Note: According to Beatles biographer Geoffrey Giuliano, Damodara gave him the notebook in 2000 when they met in Rishikesh. The 70 pages were originally written in Hindi and Nepali.) For the Beatles' stay, according to Damodara, four small stone-covered buildings had been constructed along the path from the main centre down to the ashram gates. These dome-shaped rooms included a raised platform, accessed by ladder, on which each Beatle could engage in advanced meditation. The Maharishi's accommodation was a long, modern-style bungalow located away from the other buildings.

The ashram was surrounded by barbed wire and the gates were kept locked and guarded. Although the Maharishi kept the media away from his famous students, he gave interviews to the press. To the Beatles' gratitude, he asked the reporters to come back after the band had had "a little time with the course".

Throughout the Beatles' time at the ashram, these reporters filed stories about the retreat. While the music journalists among them demonstrated a tolerant approach, those representing the mainstream press often ridiculed the idea of the retreat and meditation. The press found McCartney the most willing to engage; according to author Howard Sounes, he was "the newspaperman's pet, the sensible Beatle" who gave them quotes and posed for photos on Lakshman Jhula bridge.

== Experience ==
The Maharishi had arranged a simple lifestyle for his guests. The days were devoted to meditating and attending his lectures, which he gave from a flower-bedecked platform in an auditorium. He also gave private lessons to the individual Beatles, ostensibly due to their late arrival. The tranquil environment and protection from the media throng helped the band relax. Harrison told Saltzman, regarding the Beatles' motivation for embracing TM: "We have all the money you could ever dream of. We have all the fame you could ever wish for. But, it isn't love. It isn't health. It isn't peace inside, is it?" In Saltzman's description, Harrison had a genuine dedication to meditation whereas Lennon's approach was "more adolescent … He was looking for 'The Answer'. Well, there isn't The Answer." According to Donovan, at the Beatles' first meeting with the Maharishi after arriving, an awkward silence filled the room until Lennon walked to the Maharishi and patted him on the head, saying, "There's a good little guru." Everyone erupted with laughter. Harrison's nickname for their teacher was "the Big M".

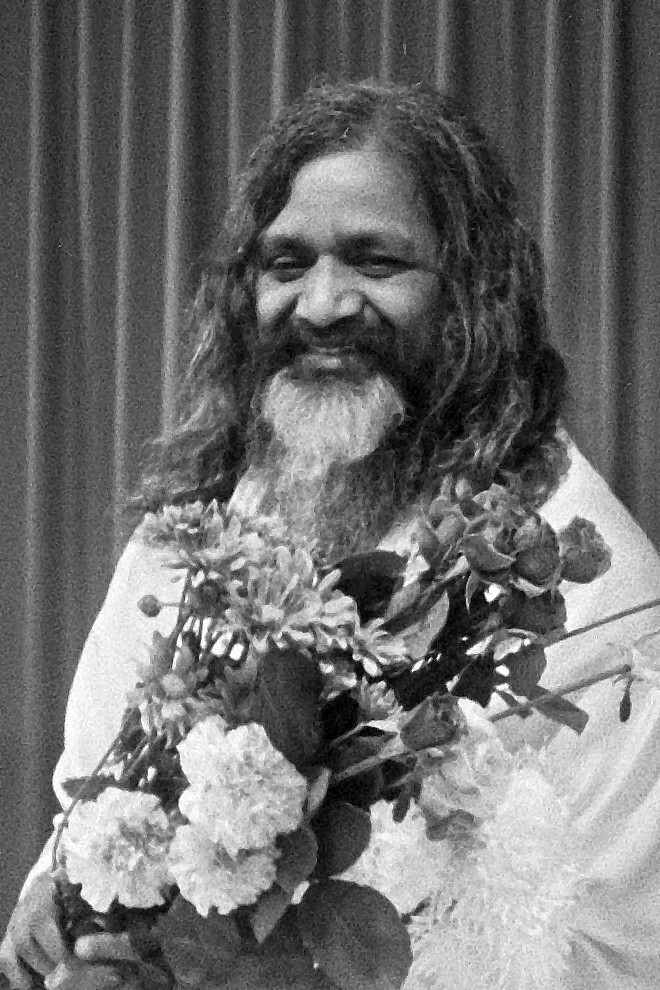
Maharishi Mahesh Yogi, pictured in Amsterdam in September 1967

In the Maharishi's teaching, there were seven levels of consciousness, and the course would provide students with experience in the fourth: "pure" or transcendental consciousness. (Note: In full, the seven levels were: waking, dreaming, deep sleep, pure consciousness, cosmic consciousness, God consciousness, and Supreme Knowledge.) While TM had earned the sobriquet "the McDonald's of meditation" for its quick and simple application, and the Maharishi espoused its scientific basis over religious dogma, strong Vedic and Hindu-aligned aspects remained. His lectures included stories and parables, and comparisons between TM and Western practices, particularly Christianity. He advocated meditation before prayer, and said that Christianity's upholding of Jesus Christ's earthbound suffering as a divine attribute was a "humiliating teaching" and a distraction from self- and God-realisation.

The Maharishi soon cancelled the formal lectures and told students to meditate for as long as possible. One student meditated for 42 straight hours, and Boyd said she once meditated for seven hours. Jenny Boyd also meditated for long periods, but suffered from dysentery (misdiagnosed as tonsillitis); she said Lennon also felt unwell, suffering from jet lag and insomnia. The lengthy meditation left many students moody and oversensitive. Several people on the course and the Maharishi were particularly concerned about Prudence Farrow's unwillingness to stop meditating.

All the students wore native dress and the ashram had a tailor on the premises to make clothes for them. The women in the Beatles party shopped in local towns and bought saris for themselves and material to be made into shirts and jackets for the men. These towns included Dehradun and Mussoorie, where markets were held by Tibetans driven out of their homeland by Chinese encroachment into Tibet. The Beatles' adoption of traditional Indian clothing affected Western fashion when they wore them after going home. Much of the proceedings at the ashram was filmed by various students on a 16mm handheld camera. Segments of this footage appear in the 1995 television documentary The Beatles Anthology.

John and George were in their element. They threw themselves totally into the Maharishi's teachings, were relaxed and above all had found peace of mind that had been denied them for so long.

— Cynthia Lennon

Vegetarian meals were eaten in a communal dining area, where food was vulnerable to aggressive monkeys (Hanuman langurs) and crows. Lennon described the food as "lousy", while Pattie Boyd said it was "delicious". Menu items included chickpeas mixed with cumin seeds, whole wheat dough baked over a fire, spiced eggplant, potatoes that had been picked locally, and, for breakfast, cornflakes, toast and coffee. Evans stockpiled eggs for Starr, who had problems with the diet because of his past illnesses. Starr recalled: "The food was impossible for me because I'm allergic to so many different things. I took two suitcases with me, one of clothes and one full of Heinz beans." After dinner, the musicians gathered on the roof of Harrison's bungalow to talk and listen to the Ganges river. Sometimes they listened to records and played guitar or sitar. Lapham recalled a conversation one evening between members of the Beatles and other students when Lennon described the band's records as "diaries of its developing consciousness" and said that this progression was also reflected in the photos and artwork used on their albums. Although the weather was cool in February, it grew hot over the ensuing weeks. By mid April, the Maharishi was planning to move the whole retreat to Kashmir, at a higher and cooler altitude.

The Beatles' approach to meditation was marked by a friendly competitiveness among the band members. Lennon was complimentary about Harrison's progress, saying: "The way George is going, he'll be flying a magic carpet by the time he's forty." Boyd recalls that she and Harrison each achieved an "out-of-body experience" through meditation but that, because their individual practice disturbed the other, they decided to move into separate rooms. While Lennon was "evangelical in his enthusiasm for the Maharishi", according to his wife Cynthia, she was "a little more skeptical". Cynthia later wrote that she "loved being in India" and had hoped she and Lennon would "rediscover our lost closeness"; to her disappointment, however, Lennon became "increasingly cold and aloof". (Note: According to an entry in Damodara's diary, the Maharishi thought that Harrison was experiencing his "last life", referring to advancing beyond the cycle of reincarnation, whereas Lennon had "many more to go" and should avoid "giv[ing] in to his weakness for women or it will ruin him".) After two weeks Lennon asked to sleep in a separate room, saying he could only meditate alone. He walked to the local post office every morning to check for Ono's almost daily telegrams. One read: "Look up at the sky and when you see a cloud think of me".

=== Songwriting ===
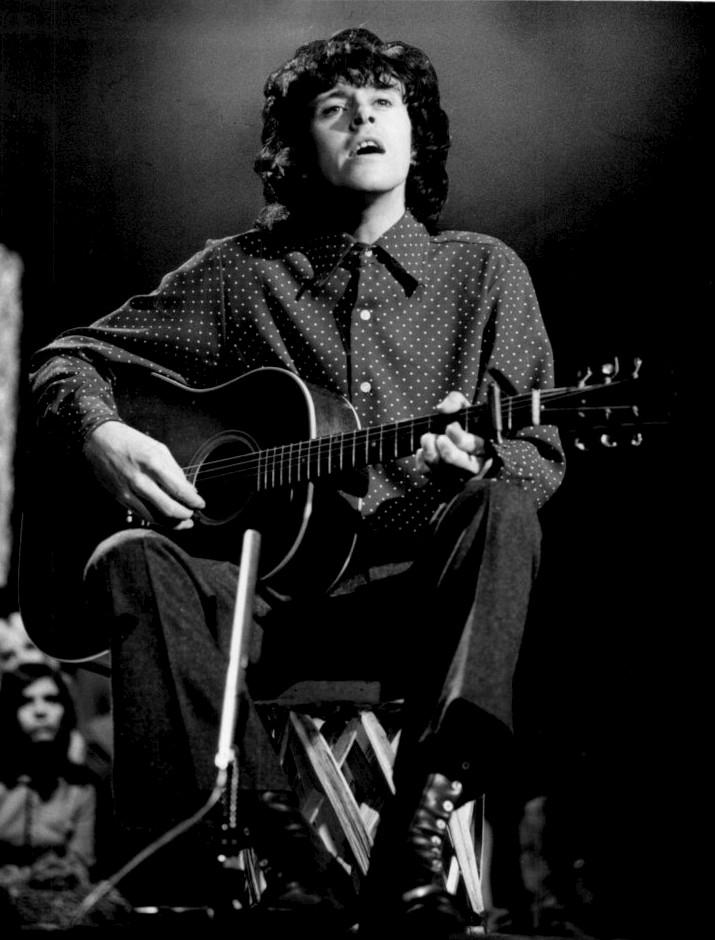
Donovan taught the Beatles a guitar finger-picking technique that they later incorporated in some of the songs on their 1968 double album commonly known as "the White Album".

Saltzman recalls that the Beatles were "very close and tight" during his time at the ashram. According to Damodara, however, at times McCartney "talk[ed] mean with George" and appeared to want to be the Beatles' "boss". Donovan taught Lennon a guitar finger-picking technique that McCartney partly mastered also. Lennon used the technique on the Beatles songs "Julia" and "Dear Prudence". Lennon composed "Dear Prudence" to lure Prudence Farrow out of her intense meditation. He said later: "She'd been locked in for three weeks and was trying to reach God quicker than anyone else."

The stay at the ashram turned out to be the group's most productive period for songwriting. According to Lennon, he wrote some of the "most miserable" and some of his "best" songs while he was in Rishikesh. Starr completed his first solo composition, "Don't Pass Me By", which he had begun writing in 1963. In his 2005 autobiography, Donovan recalls that while the other three Beatles played acoustic guitars, Starr sometimes played a set of tabla hand drums, which Harrison had bought for him in Delhi. The retreat was also a productive one for Donovan as a songwriter. He recalls having "many a great little jam" with McCartney and says that, with Harrison demonstrating on sitar the knowledge he had gained through his teacher, Ravi Shankar, he and Harrison were "soon chording a new song or two", including the Indian-styled "Hurdy Gurdy Man". (Note: Harrison contributed a verse to "Hurdy Gurdy Man", although it was edited from the single release in May 1968. While in Rishikesh, Donovan also wrote "Happiness Runs", "The Sun Is a Very Magic Fellow" (with lyrical assistance from Evans) and "Lord of the Reedy River", which was later recorded by Kate Bush.)

Plans were discussed for a possible concert in Delhi to feature the Beatles, the Beach Boys, Donovan, and Paul Horn. While he also wrote several new songs in Rishikesh, Harrison complained that more time should be spent on meditating. When McCartney discussed his vision for an album containing the songs they had amassed so far, Harrison replied: "We're not fucking here to do the next album. We're here to meditate!" In Donovan's recollection, when not meditating, McCartney was rarely without his guitar and kept the Beatles party "entertained" with parody songs such as "Rocky Raccoon" and "Back in the U.S.S.R.", but he was not "totally convinced" about TM. Many of the Beatles' new songs were inspired by nature and reflected the simplicity of their surroundings. In this way, they contrasted markedly with the band's psychedelic work over the previous year, although few of them were overtly reflective of the TM experience. An exception was "Sour Milk Sea", in which Harrison exhorts his listeners to embrace meditation and "illumination", while Lennon's "Child of Nature" and McCartney's "Mother Nature's Son" were both inspired by one of the Maharishi's lectures. (Note: In addition, Lennon's lyrics in "Everybody's Got Something to Hide Except Me and My Monkey" include quotes from the Maharishi regarding meditation, such as "Come on, it's such a joy" and "The deeper you go, the higher you fly / The higher you fly, the deeper you go".)

=== Special events ===
==== Group photo ====
In late February, the Maharishi arranged for a group photo of all the students. In Lapham's description, the Maharishi began preparing for the shot early one morning and approached the task as if "the director on a movie set". Instructing his assistants, he oversaw the assembly of a platform of risers, the precise placement of flowers and potted plants in front of the raised stage, and the seating allocation for each of the students from his hand-drawn diagram. The students were then called down to take their allocated seat.

Surrounding the Maharishi, each member was dressed in traditional Indian attire and adorned with a marigold garland of orange. Lapham commented that the Maharishi had the Beatles positioned "in the center of the set", surrounding him, with the other students "arranged according to the degrees of their celebrity". The Maharishi had a large picture of Brahmananda Saraswati – the guru evoked by Lennon in "Across the Universe" – placed behind him. The Maharishi encouraged his students to present their best "cosmic smiles" to the camera. The photo took half an hour to complete while the participants sat facing the bright morning sun. In 2009, The Hindu described the result as "one of the most iconic photographs in the history of rock 'n' roll". (Note: In a 2010 report on the production of film-maker Martin Scorsese's documentary George Harrison: Living in the Material World, the Daily News & Analysis said: "The pictures of the Beatles, the fashion leaders of the time, sitting cross-legged with the Maharishi, sparked a huge interest in Indian mysticism and meditation.")

For the Beatles' public image, their attire contrasted with the modern, psychedelic clothing they had worn on arrival from London. The photo and others from the shoot were used in Lapham's cover article for The Saturday Evening Post, a magazine that, although in decline by 1968, was influential among America's suburban middle class. (Note: Writing in the late 1970s, author Nicholas Schaffner said that the Maharishi's most enduring success was in attracting people in "Middle America" to TM's benefits as a stress reliever. By promoting his cause through more conservative channels, the Maharishi won adherents in academia, politics, the military and NASA's Apollo space program.) Saltzman was one of the photographers at the session. His shots from this time were compiled in his book The Beatles in Rishikesh, published in 2000.

==== Birthday celebrations and river excursions ====
On 25 February, the Maharishi held a party to celebrate Harrison's 25th birthday. The event included communal chanting, a sitar performance by Harrison, and a firework display. The Maharishi gave Harrison an upside-down plastic globe of the world and said: "George, the globe I am giving you symbolizes the world today. I hope you will help us all in the task of putting it right." Harrison turned the globe over and said "I've done it!", and the other students applauded. For Love's birthday, on 15 March, members of the Beatles and Donovan performed "Spiritual Regeneration/Happy Birthday Mike Love", a song based on the Beach Boys' "Fun, Fun, Fun". Lennon presented Love with a round handmade card containing a self-portrait of him naked, and Harrison gave him a painting of Guru Dev. A dual celebration was held on 17 March for the birthdays of Boyd and Horn. On 8 April, the Maharishi gave an Indian prince's outfit to the Lennons for their son in England on his birthday.

An aviation company owner and patron of the Maharishi's, Kershi Cambata, flew two helicopters to Rishikesh to take the Maharishi and his guests for rides. Lapham wrote that Cooke de Herrera, a friend of Cambata, had arranged this event to provide what she called a "visitation of modernity". McCartney recalled that he asked Lennon why he was so eager to be the one to go with the Maharishi on his helicopter ride, and that Lennon replied: "I thought he might slip me the Answer."

In early March, an Italian newsreel company filmed the Maharishi and many students, including the Beatles and other musicians, going down to the river while the musicians sang standards such as "When the Saints Go Marching In" and "You Are My Sunshine". (Note: At the Maharishi's request, Donovan performed his composition "Happiness Runs", with Harrison, and then "Catch the Wind", accompanied at times by Lennon. Excerpts from the Italian newsreel footage were used in the 1982 documentary The Compleat Beatles.) One evening when the moon was full, the Maharishi arranged for everyone to cruise on the Ganges in two barges. The trip started with the chanting of Vedas by two pandits, after which the musicians brought out their instruments. The Beatles sang Donovan songs, while Love and Donovan sang Beatles songs, and Horn played flute.

=== Early departures ===
McCartney and Starr told Lapham that they had each experienced the benefits of meditation but the band's trip to India was more out of support for "George's thing". Starr's wife had a strong aversion to insects; McCartney recalled that Maureen was once "trapped in her room because there was a fly over the door". Spiders, mosquitoes and flies were present at the ashram, and when Starr complained to the Maharishi he was told: "For people travelling in the realm of pure consciousness, flies no longer matter very much." Starr said in reply, "Yes, but that doesn't zap the flies, does it"? Starr disliked the food, and he and Maureen missed their children. The couple left India on 1 March, and on their return to the UK, Starr was keen to avoid the impression that he was no longer interested in TM. He told reporters: "The Academy is a great place and I enjoyed it a lot. I still meditate every day for half an hour in the morning and half an hour every evening and I think I'm a better person for it … If everyone in the world started meditating, the world would be a much happier place."

McCartney and Asher departed in mid to late March. (Note: The couple arrived back in London on 26 March. Among Beatles biographers, Bob Spitz says they left Rishikesh on 24 March, Barry Miles gives a date of 26 March, and Ian MacDonald and Philip Norman both date their departure to mid-March. According to Bob Woffinden, McCartney and Asher travelled in India before returning to the UK.) According to Cooke de Herrera's account, McCartney had arranged to get back to London to supervise Apple Corps, and Asher had a theatrical commitment; as he left he told Cooke de Herrera, "I'm a new man." According to what he told Lapham, however, McCartney was uncomfortable with the Maharishi's flattery, particularly his calling the Beatles "the blessed leaders of the world's youth", and he found himself lost in the Maharishi's more elaborate discussions. Damodara wrote that Asher had no interest in meditation, a view echoed by Saltzman, who said that she was eager to visit the Taj Mahal with McCartney. McCartney later said that his intention had always been to stay for only a month, and that he knew he risked accusations from his bandmates that he was not sincere about meditation.

Mia Farrow departed to begin work on a new film in London, where she arrived on 8 March. Described by author Jonathan Gould as "restless", she had left the ashram before to visit Goa, and then returned. In her 1997 autobiography, Farrow recalls that she felt overwhelmed by the Maharishi's attention to her, which included private sessions, gifts of mangoes, and a birthday party where he gave her a paper crown. Love left the retreat on 15 March, having stayed just over two weeks, due to his tour commitments with the Beach Boys, but would complete his TM instructor course in 1972. Donovan departed because he recognised he had a "mission" in music and sought to convey the Maharishi's teachings in that way. (Note: In the 30 March issue of the NME, Keith Altham reported on Donovan's recent concert at the Royal Albert Hall in London, where he performed new songs such as "The Boy Who Fell in Love with a Swan" and "Hurdy Gurdy Man". Altham commented on the presence backstage of Farrow, dressed in an Indian shawl from Rishikesh.)

== Tensions ==
=== Business arrangements and Mardas' arrival ===
According to Gould, Lennon and Harrison viewed their bandmates' departures as an example of McCartney and Starr "once again balking on the path to higher consciousness", just as the pair, particularly McCartney, had earlier held out before joining them in their LSD experimentation. While Harrison and Lennon remained steadfast in their devotion to meditation, some members of the Beatles' circle continued to be distrustful of the Maharishi's hold on them. Aspinall was surprised when he realised that the Maharishi was a sophisticated negotiator, knowing more than the average person about financial percentages. According to Saltzman, Evans told him that the Maharishi wanted the band to deposit up to 25 per cent of their next album's profits into his Swiss bank account as a tithe, to which Lennon replied, "Over my dead body." In Brown's account, Lennon was not opposed to paying the tithe until Alex Mardas, the Maharishi's "most powerful critic", intervened.

Mardas arrived after McCartney had left. He pointed to the luxury of the facility and the business acumen of the Maharishi and asked Lennon why the Maharishi always had an accountant by his side. Mardas also derided the characters of the non-celebrity meditators and was highly critical of the way the Beatles had been assembled for the "class photo" and the promotion of the Maharishi's movement. In an attempt to silence his criticism, according to Mardas, the Maharishi offered him money to build a high-powered radio station. Lennon later told his wife that he felt that the Maharishi had, in her words, "too much interest in public recognition, celebrities and money" for a spiritual man. Cynthia Lennon, Cooke de Herrera, and author and Beatles associate Barry Miles have blamed Mardas for turning Lennon against the Maharishi. Miles writes that Mardas feared for his status as Lennon's personal guru, and set about sabotaging the relationship between the Beatles and the Maharishi. In a statement published in The New York Times in 2010, Mardas denied that this was the case.

=== Competing documentary film proposals ===
Before leaving London in February, the Beatles had considered making a documentary film about the Maharishi through Apple Films. The idea gained traction once they got to the ashram, which led to their summoning Denis O'Dell to Rishikesh. Together with Aspinall, he flew to India intent on dissuading the Beatles from making the film. (Note: In O'Dell's recollection, the band lost interest after he mentioned a possible film adaptation of Tolkien's The Lord of the Rings. He had just been discussing this project with United Artists as a feature film starring the Beatles, to be directed by David Lean.) According to Cooke de Herrera, the Maharishi gave the Beatles and Apple the rights for a film about him, his movement and his teacher, Guru Dev. Joe Massot, who had directed Wonderwall, said that Harrison phoned him from India inviting him to participate in the project. However, Charles Lutes, the head of the Spiritual Regeneration Movement in the US, had already arranged with the Maharishi to produce a similar documentary, with Horn. In early April, Lutes arrived at the ashram to ensure that his venture was not jeopardised by the Beatles' interest. He signed a contract with Four Star Films and John Farrow was scheduled to direct the film. Horn expected that Donovan, the Beatles, the Beach Boys and Mia Farrow would appear in it.

According to Mike Dolan, another of the TM students, when a film crew from Lutes' company Bliss Productions arrived later in April, Lennon and Harrison "were more than a little pissed" and made a point of staying out of sight. Horn said that the arrival of the film crew was the catalyst for the discontent that resulted in the last two Beatles' premature departure from Rishikesh. In Massot's recollection, the crew was led by producer Gene Corman, who subsequently pleaded with Massot to use his influence with Harrison and Lennon to ensure the Beatles' participation. Cooke de Herrera also felt that the Four Star deal and the presence of the film crew was the reason for the sudden departure.

=== Allegations of sexual impropriety ===
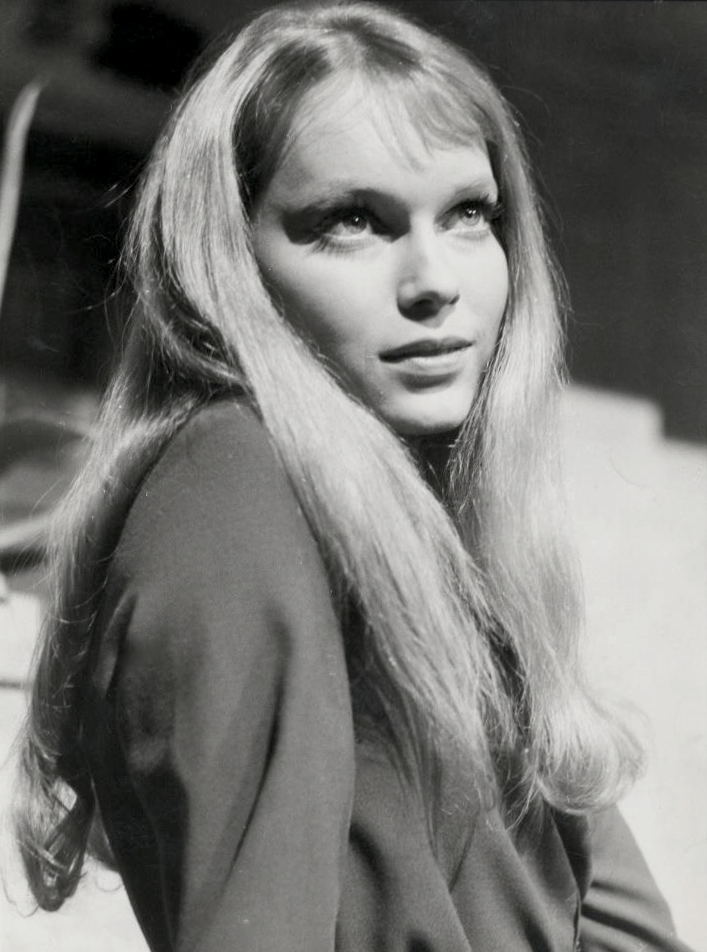
Mia Farrow, pictured in 1964

Before leaving the ashram, Mia Farrow told some of the other students that the Maharishi had made a pass at her. In her 1993 autobiography, Cooke de Herrera says that Farrow confided to her, before the arrival of the Beatles, that the Maharishi had made a pass during a private puja ceremony by stroking her hair. Cooke de Herrera says she told Farrow that she had misinterpreted the Maharishi's actions. Farrow's 1997 memoirs are ambiguous, describing an encounter in his private meditation "cave" when the Maharishi tried to put his arms around her. (Note: In the 1970s, Farrow told Ned Wynn, one of her childhood friends, that the Maharishi had attempted to initiate sex with her.) She also says that her sister Prudence assured her that it was "an honour" and "a tradition" for a "holy man" to touch someone after meditation.

In Pattie Boyd's account, it was the allegations of the Maharishi's sexual impropriety that caused life at the retreat to go "horribly wrong". Through Mardas' insistence, Lennon became convinced that the Maharishi, who said he was celibate, had had a sexual encounter with one of the young female students. (Note: Lennon later called the Maharishi a "lecherous womanizer".) As reported by Brown, the woman was a "pretty blond nurse from California" who, Mardas said, had engaged in a sexual relationship with the Maharishi. Dolan recalls that she was in fact a "feisty" schoolteacher from New York, named Rosalyn Bonas (or "RB"), who was having an affair with Mardas. She had become disillusioned at the extent to which Hindu tradition and the Vedas were part of the course, and was prevented from leaving early for the US due to the conditions of her airline ticket. Jenny Boyd wrote that she had seen Mardas and the woman deep in conversation, "obviously cooking something up". (Note: According to Dolan, "RB" was most likely susceptible to the distraction. She "felt deceived" by the Spiritual Regeneration Movement and had earned a reputation among the ashram staff as a troublemaker.)

On the Beatles' final night at the ashram, Mardas arranged to entrap the Maharishi by spying on him and the woman when they were alone together. Mardas then reported to the others that he saw the two of them in a compromising position. Many of the people at the ashram – including Harrison, Horn, Cooke de Herrera, Dolan, Cynthia Lennon and Jenny Boyd – did not believe that the Maharishi had made a pass at any woman. According to Cynthia, however, Mardas' allegations "gathered momentum ... without a single shred of evidence or justification". (Note: McCartney similarly said: "it was Magic Alex who made the original accusation and I think that it was completely untrue." In his autobiography, Love writes: "I'm not saying he's infallible but … the only time he was ever accused of misconduct was when the Beatles were right there with him? Please.") In her autobiography, Pattie Boyd also expresses doubt regarding the truth behind Mardas' claims, but in this atmosphere of suspicion, she had a "horrid dream about Maharishi" and, the next day, told Harrison that they should leave. According to Harrison, Lennon "had wanted to leave anyway", to see Ono, and the speculation surrounding Farrow and other female students "stirred up a situation" that Lennon was able to exploit. (Note: Boyd also describes the allegations as Lennon's "excuse" to reunite with Ono, and says that they seemed to emanate from Mardas' desire "to get John away from Rishikesh".)

=== Infringements of the Maharishi's ban on alcohol and recreational drugs ===
Deepak Chopra, who was not present but later became a disciple of the Maharishi and a friend of Harrison, said in 2006 that the Maharishi was displeased with the Beatles because they were taking drugs, including LSD, at the ashram. Members of the Beatles group also violated the Maharishi's "no alcohol rule" when they consumed "hooch" that Mardas, whom Cynthia thought was not an active meditator, acquired from a nearby village and shared with the women. Harrison and Lennon did not imbibe and were highly critical of those who did.

Massot recalled that he himself arrived at the ashram with a small amount of hashish, which he shared with Lennon. In his autobiography, Donovan writes that when John Farrow arrived, he presented him with a large block of hashish that "someone had brought into the ashram". Donovan took the block from Farrow's hand and threw it out into the Ganges. Dolan, who stayed in a bungalow next to the one occupied by Mardas and Bonas, said that Bonas "openly" smoked hashish, and he became used to the "familiar smell of very happy herb" emanating from their room. According to Chopra, the departure of Lennon and Harrison was not of their own volition but at the request of the Maharishi, due to his disapproval of their entourage taking drugs: "[The Maharishi] lost his temper with them. He asked them to leave, and they did in a huff."

== Lennon and Harrison's departure ==
On the night of 11–12 April, Lennon, Harrison and Mardas sat up late discussing the Maharishi and decided to leave the next morning. In Brown's description, they argued, and Harrison was "furious" at Mardas' actions and did not believe "a word" of the allegations. In the morning, the Beatles and their wives left hurriedly, while Mardas went to Dehradun to find taxis. Lennon was chosen to speak to the Maharishi.

Lennon described the exchange in a highly emotional December 1970 interview with Jann Wenner of Rolling Stone, which was later published as the book Lennon Remembers. When the Maharishi asked why they were leaving, Lennon replied, "If you're so cosmic, you'll know why." Lennon recalled that his mind was made up when the Maharishi gave him a murderous look in response. Lennon said he was "a bit rough to him" and the Maharishi responded by saying, "I don't know why, you must tell me." According to Mardas' 2010 statement: "John Lennon and I went to the Maharishi about what had happened ... he asked the Maharishi to explain himself"; and the Maharishi answered Lennon's accusation by saying, "I am only human." With regard to his own position, Harrison said that he had already told the Maharishi that he would be leaving before the course relocated to Kashmir, because he was due to participate in the filming of Raga, a documentary about Ravi Shankar, in the south of India. According to Harrison's account of his and Lennon's final conversation with the Maharishi, in the 2000 book The Beatles Anthology, Harrison reminded him of the plan to join Shankar, but the Maharishi was unable to accept it. Harrison added: "That's when John said something like, 'Well, you're supposed to be the mystic, you should know.'"

While waiting for their taxis, Lennon wrote "Maharishi" (later retitled "Sexy Sadie"), in which he sang: "Maharishi – what have you done? / You made a fool of everyone." (Note: Also among the original lyrics were the lines "You little twat / Who the fuck do you think you are?" Lennon renamed the song after Harrison told him that the message was "ridiculous" and potentially libellous.) In a 1974 interview, Lennon said that they were convinced that the delay in the taxis' arrival was orchestrated by locals loyal to the Maharishi, and this paranoia was exacerbated by the presence of "the mad Greek". According to Cynthia Lennon, when the group finally left the ashram, the Maharishi looked "very biblical and isolated in his faith". Jenny Boyd later wrote: "Poor Maharishi. I remember him standing at the gate of the ashram, under an aide's umbrella, as the Beatles filed by, out of his life. 'Wait,' he cried. 'Talk to me.' But no one listened."

After leaving Rishikesh, the taxis repeatedly broke down, leading the Beatles to wonder if the Maharishi had placed a curse on them. The car that the Lennons were in suffered a flat tyre and the driver left them, apparently to find a replacement tyre, but did not return for hours. After it grew dark, the couple hitched a ride to Delhi. They then took the first available flight back to London, during which Lennon drunkenly recounted a litany of his numerous infidelities to Cynthia. Harrison was not ready to return to London and face running Apple and the band's other commitments. In her autobiography, Boyd writes: "Instead, we went to see Ravi Shankar and lost ourselves in his music." Harrison said when he got dysentery in Madras that he thought it might have been due to a spell cast by the Maharishi, but he recovered after Shankar gave him some amulets. (Note: As a result of falling ill in Madras, Harrison was unable to take part in filming for Raga. He instead filmed his scenes with Shankar in June at the Esalen Institute in Big Sur in California.)

== Aftermath and impact on the Beatles ==
[The Beatles'] trip to Rishikesh occupies a place in their story analogous to that of their first overseas adventure, their inaugural visit to Hamburg in the fall of 1960. Separated by eight years of once-unimaginable success, these two journeys represented the Beatles' real-life magical mystery tours … Though the symbolism and symmetry seem almost too perfect, the mysterious bond that had first been sealed on the stage of a seedy Hamburg nightclub called the Indra would begin to unravel eight years later in the hills of India itself.

— Author Jonathan Gould, 2007

The Beatles' departure and split with the Maharishi was well-publicised. In Delhi, Lennon and Harrison merely told reporters that they had urgent business in London and did not want to appear in the Maharishi's film. Once reunited in the UK, the band announced that they were disillusioned by the Maharishi's desire for financial gain. (Note: Lennon dismissed the idea that the presence of the film crew had contributed to the timing of his and Harrison's exit.) On 14 May, when Lennon and McCartney, accompanied by Mardas and Derek Taylor, were in New York to launch Apple to the US media, Lennon used his appearance on The Tonight Show to denounce the Maharishi. He told the host, Joe Garagiola, "We believe in meditation, but not the Maharishi and his scene" and: "We made a mistake. He's human like the rest of us." On another occasion, McCartney said: "[The Maharishi]'s a nice fellow. We're just not going out with him any more." By the time he returned to London, on 21 April, Harrison felt that he and Lennon were wrong in the way they had treated the Maharishi. In June, Harrison told reporters in Los Angeles that his dissatisfaction was centred on how the Spiritual Regeneration Movement was "too much of an organization". (Note: The following year, by which point he and, briefly, Lennon were exploring Krishna Consciousness under Swami Prabhupada, Harrison told the International Times: "It's just that we physically left the Maharishi's camp but spiritually never moved an inch. We still meditate now. At least, I do.")

Lennon's outspokenness was informed by the sense of personal betrayal he felt towards the Maharishi, and his 1970 Rolling Stone interview represented a purging of his past, in line with the emotional effects of his recent primal therapy treatment under Arthur Janov. (Note: Although he soon rejected Janov's guidance also, Lennon's 1970 Rolling Stone interview took place at a time when he believed primal therapy provided the solutions that he had been searching for with the Maharishi. Author Tim Riley comments that, when describing his and Harrison's departure from the ashram in the 1970 interview, Lennon included a "whopper" of a revelation related to his childhood abandonment issues and the unrealistic expectations he formed in his adult life: "I'm always expecting my mother and I don't get her, that's what it is.") In the interview, Lennon referred to "a big hullaballo about [the Maharishi] trying to rape Mia Farrow or somebody and trying to get off with a few other women", and, since 1968, the allegations concerning Farrow were rumoured to be the cause of the Beatles' split with the Maharishi. Brown wrote in The Love You Make, first published in 1983, that his book told for the first time "what really happened in the ashram", challenging the "widely circulated" but incorrect story about Farrow. (Note: According to author Philip Goldberg, writing in 2010: "For the rest of Maharishi's days, even in his obituaries, journalists could hardly mention his name without referring to the incident, more often than not assuming that the allegations were true. For the record, no evidence of hanky-panky has ever surfaced.") Reflecting in a 1980 interview, Lennon said he had been "bitter" after discovering that the Maharishi was "human", just as he was later about Janov for the same reason. Lennon and Ono holidayed in India in late 1969. According to author Susan Shumsky, a TM devotee, Lennon sent a telegram to the ashram, saying he was in Delhi and urgently wanted to see the Maharishi. As he and his secretary discussed the telegram, the Maharishi repeatedly claimed not to recognise Lennon's name, and he ended the conversation by saying: "I do not know a John Lennon."

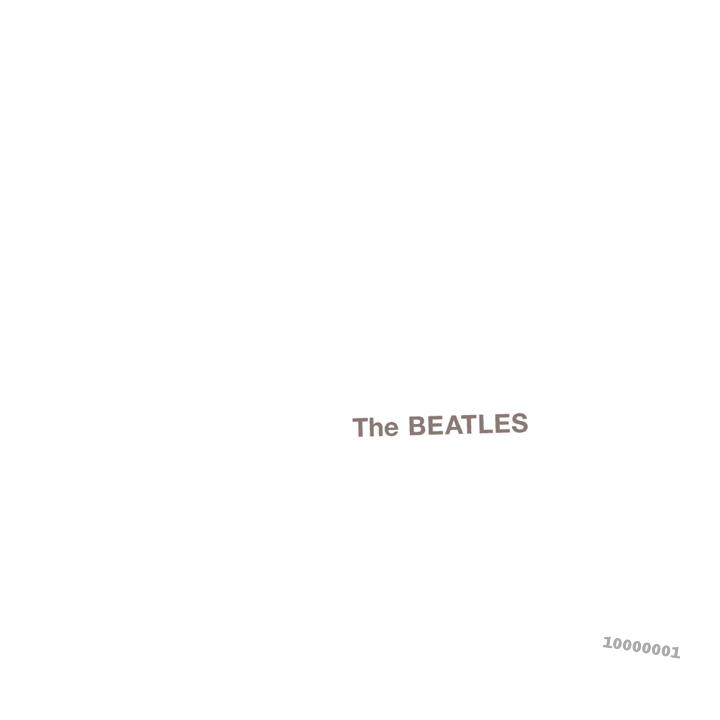
The cover of The Beatles

Writing for Mojo in 2003, author and journalist Mark Paytress said that, for many observers, the Beatles' falling out with the Maharishi engendered a long-lasting suspicion that "they'd become faddists tipped into eccentric habits by unfathomable fame". Having given up touring in 1966, the trip to India was the last time all four Beatles travelled together. Their self-exploration through meditation and before that, LSD, led to each of them adopting a more individual focus, at the expense of band unity, through to the group's break-up in 1970. The acrimony within the band was evident during the recording of their 1968 double album The Beatles (also known as the "White Album"), when they recorded many of the songs written in Rishikesh. Adding to the tense atmosphere, after Lennon had left his wife, Ono became a constant presence from the start of the sessions and was viewed by the other Beatles as an unwelcome intrusion into the group dynamic.

Author Nicholas Schaffner wrote in 1978 that, following their return from Rishikesh, Lennon, Harrison and McCartney were "three very different personalities who seldom saw eye-to-eye any more". He also said that the trio served as an "almost archetypal cross-section" of the many young people who progressed from LSD to Indian spirituality during the late 1960s: Lennon "continued to drift from one unconventional self-awareness trip to another"; Harrison intensified his interest by embracing Krishna Consciousness, or the Hare Krishna movement, under A.C. Bhaktivedanta Swami Prabhupada; and McCartney exchanged "consciousness expansion" for "more bourgeois preoccupations".

== Legacy ==
Philip Goldberg, in his book American Veda, writes that the Beatles' trip to Rishikesh "may have been the most momentous spiritual retreat since Jesus spent those forty days in the wilderness". Despite their rejection of the Maharishi, the Beatles generated wider interest in TM, which encouraged the study of Eastern spirituality in Western popular culture. Chopra credits Harrison with spreading TM and other Eastern spiritual practices to America almost single-handedly. Spiritual biographer Gary Tillery also recognises the Beatles, or more specifically Harrison, as having "abruptly brought Indian spirituality to everyday awareness" through their association with the Maharishi. Tillery writes that, while the influence of Indian gurus such as Vivekananda, Yogananda, the Maharishi and Prabhupada was well established by the late 1960s, it was the Beatles' endorsement of their respective philosophies that most contributed to yoga and meditation centres becoming ubiquitous in Western cities and towns over subsequent decades. According to author Andrew Grant Jackson:

The Beats had promoted Buddhism since the 1950s, but it was George Harrison's songs espousing Hindu philosophy and featuring Indian musicians, and the Beatles' study of Transcendental Meditation, that truly kick-started the human potential movement of the 1970s (rebranded New Age in the 1980s). In this way, the musicians helped expand the freedom of religion the United States was founded on to encompass options outside the Judeo-Christian tradition.

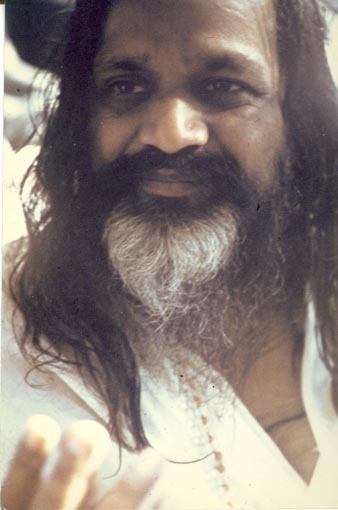
The Maharishi in 1973

Mike Love arranged for the Beach Boys to tour the United States with the Maharishi in May 1968. However, the tour was cancelled after several appearances and was called "one of the more bizarre entertainments of the era". (Note: Love attributes its failure to the Beatles' "repudiation of Maharishi", which led to poor ticket sales and hostility from some concert-goers.) After 1968 the Maharishi fell out of the public spotlight for a period and TM was described as a passing fad. Interest grew again in the 1970s when scientific studies began showing concrete results. The Maharishi appeared twice on American television's The Merv Griffin Show in the mid-1970s, leading to a surge of popularity called the "Merv wave" that lasted until the end of the decade. In a 1975 interview, Harrison said of the Beatles' association with TM: "In retrospect, that was probably one of the greatest experiences I've ever had … Maharishi was always put down for propagating what was basically a spiritual thing but there's so much being propagated that's damaging to life that I'm glad there are good people around like him." In 1978 Lennon wrote that he considered his meditation a "source of creative inspiration". Despite Lennon's public denouncing of the Maharishi, according to Tillery, "for the rest of his life he often turned to meditation to restore himself and improve his creativity."

In her 2005 book Gurus in America, author Cynthia Ann Humes comments that although the split between the Beatles and Maharishi was widely reported, there has been "little mention" of "the continued positive relationship Maharishi maintained" with Harrison and McCartney. During the 1990s, Harrison and McCartney were so convinced of the Maharishi's innocence on the issue of sexual impropriety that they each offered their apologies. Harrison gave a benefit concert for the Maharishi-associated Natural Law Party in 1992, and later apologised for the way the Maharishi had been treated by saying, "We were very young." In The Beatles Anthology, he stated: "It's probably in the history books that Maharishi 'tried to attack Mia Farrow' – but it's bullshit, total bullshit." Asked if he forgave the Beatles, following Harrison's public apology in 1991, the Maharishi replied, "I could never be upset with angels." McCartney took his daughter Stella to visit the Maharishi in the Netherlands in 2007, which renewed their friendship.

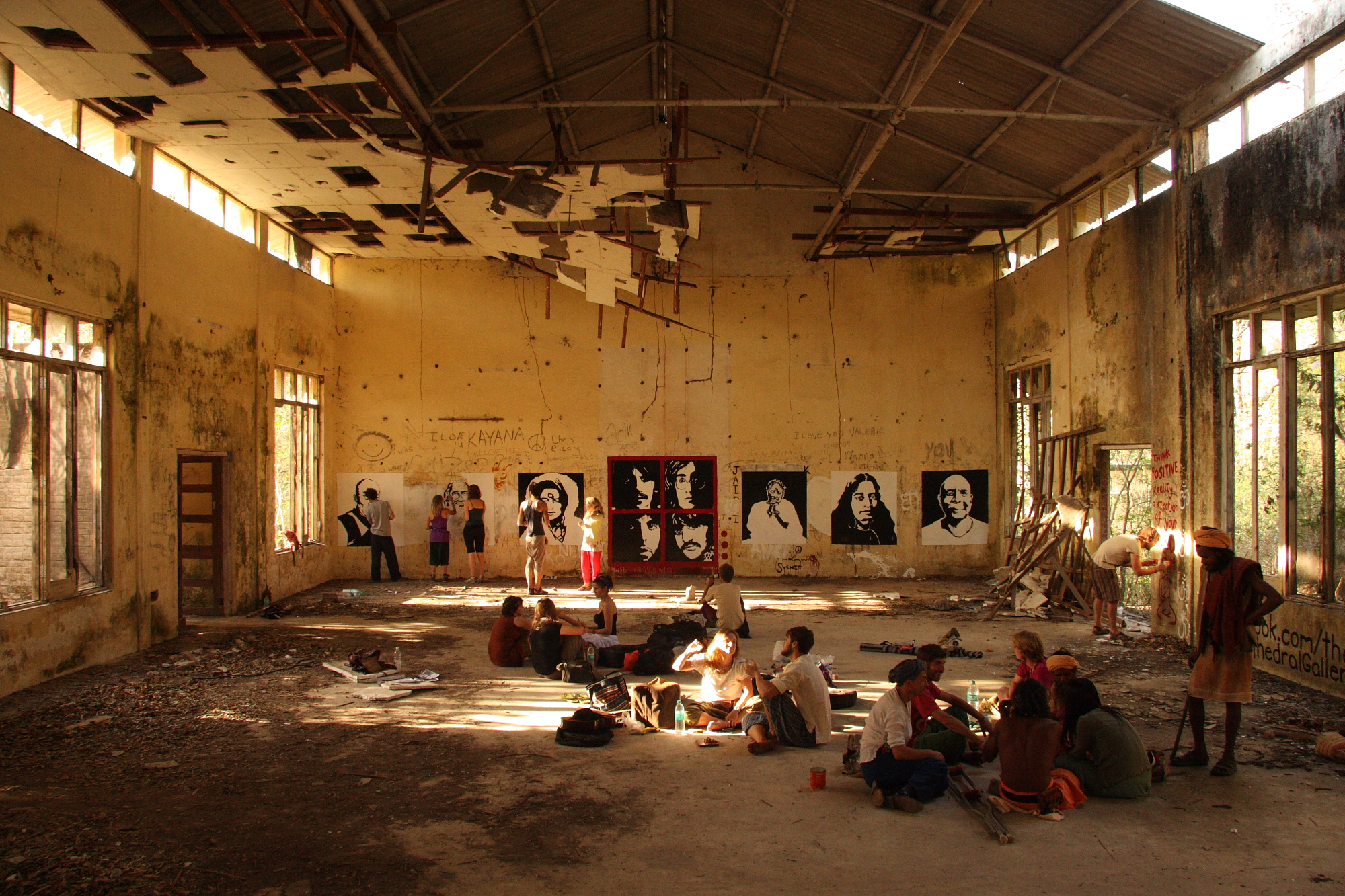
Satsang Hall in the abandoned ashram, 2012

By the time of the Maharishi's death in 2008, more than 5 million people had learned TM, and his worldwide movement was valued in the billions of dollars. After the Maharishi died, McCartney said: "my memories of him will only be joyful ones. He was a great man who worked tirelessly for the people of the world and the cause of unity." Starr said in 2008, "I feel so blessed I met the Maharishi – he gave me a mantra that no one can take away, and I still use it". Representing her late husband, Yoko Ono said: "John would have been the first one now, if he had been here, to recognize and acknowledge what Maharishi has done for the world and appreciate it." In 2009, McCartney, Starr, Donovan and Horn reunited at a concert held at New York's Radio City Music Hall to benefit the David Lynch Foundation, which funds the teaching of TM in schools. A 2011 article titled "Celebrities Who Meditate", in The Daily Telegraph, reported Harrison as having said: "Maharishi only ever did good for us, and although I have not been with him physically, I never left him."

In 2007, Indian-born American film-maker Mira Nair said she had begun work on a documentary film about the Beatles' visit to India. Paul Saltzman's photographs from the retreat have been displayed in galleries throughout North America and in a permanent exhibition above the retail units in the departure lounge of Liverpool John Lennon Airport. In February 2018, the 50th anniversary of Lennon and Harrison's arrival in Rishikesh was marked by the opening of a two-year exhibition titled The Beatles in India at the Beatles Story museum in Liverpool. A similar celebration took place at the ashram site, now known as Beatles Ashram. The exhibition in Liverpool was announced as featuring memorabilia, photographs by Saltzman, a sitar courtesy of the Ravi Shankar Foundation, and video contributions from Pattie and Jenny Boyd.

=== Documentaries ===
The Beatles' 1968 retreat in Rishikesh is the subject of Saltzman's documentary film Meeting the Beatles in India (2020), and formed part of the documentary The Beatles and India (2021) by Ajoy Bose. Reviewing The Beatles and India for The Guardian, Peter Bradshaw said the Beatles "used their colossal influence, greater than any politician or movie star or religious leader, to direct the world's attention to India, a country which until then had been opaque for many in the west". (Note: In his review for Uncut, Pete Paphides welcomes the "corrective to pernicious inaccuracies" surrounding Lennon and Harrison's departure from the ashram, as Bose's film includes Beatles historians Mark Lewisohn and Steve Turner highlighting the "Machiavellian machinations" of Mardas in spreading rumours about the Maharishi.)

== Songs written by the Beatles in Rishikesh ==
The Beatles wrote many songs during their visit to Rishikesh: 30 by one count, 48 by another. Lennon said: "We wrote about thirty new songs between us. Paul must have done about a dozen. George says he's got six, and I wrote fifteen. And look what meditation did for Ringo – after all this time he wrote his first song." Many of the songs became a part of the album The Beatles, while others appeared on Abbey Road in 1969 or on solo records.

Released on The Beatles:

- "Back in the U.S.S.R."
- "Blackbird"
- "The Continuing Story of Bungalow Bill"
- "Cry Baby Cry"
- "Dear Prudence"
- "Don't Pass Me By"
- "Everybody's Got Something to Hide Except Me and My Monkey"
- "I Will"
- "I'm So Tired"
- "Julia"
- "Long, Long, Long"
- "Mother Nature's Son"
- "Ob-La-Di, Ob-La-Da"
- "Revolution"
- "Rocky Raccoon"
- "Sexy Sadie" (originally titled "Maharishi")
- "Why Don't We Do It in the Road?"
- "Wild Honey Pie"
- "Yer Blues"

Released on Abbey Road:

- "Mean Mr. Mustard"
- "Polythene Pam"

Released on solo albums, and others:

- "Child of Nature" (reworked as "Jealous Guy" for Lennon's Imagine)
- "Circles" (on Harrison's Gone Troppo in 1982)
- "Cosmically Conscious" (on McCartney's Off the Ground: The Complete Works in 1993)
- "Dehradun" (Harrison's song, released for the 50th Anniversary edition of 'All Things Must Pass')
- "Junk" (on McCartney in 1970)
- "Look at Me" (on John Lennon/Plastic Ono Band in 1970)
- "Sour Milk Sea" (recorded by Apple Records artist Jackie Lomax and released on a single in 1968)
- "Spiritual Regeneration/Happy Birthday Mike Love" (recorded at Rishikesh but never released)
- "Teddy Boy" (on McCartney in 1970)
- "What's the New Mary Jane" (recorded for The Beatles double album but released on the 1996 compilation Anthology 3)

== See also ==
- Outline of the Beatles
- The Beatles timeline

== Sources ==
- Badman, Keith (2004). The Beach Boys: The Definitive Diary of America's Greatest Band, on Stage and in the Studio. San Francisco, CA: Backbeat Books. ISBN 0-87930-818-4.
- The Beatles (2000). The Beatles Anthology. San Francisco, CA: Chronicle Books. ISBN 978-0-8118-2684-6.
- Boyd, Pattie; with Junor, Penny (2007). Wonderful Today: The Autobiography. London: Headline Review. ISBN 978-0-7553-1646-5.
- Brown, Peter; Gaines, Steven (2002) [1983]. The Love You Make: An Insider's Story of the Beatles. New York, NY: New American Library. ISBN 978-0-4512-0735-7.
- Clayson, Alan (2003). George Harrison. London: Sanctuary. ISBN 1-86074-489-3.
- Cooke de Herrera, Nancy (1992). Beyond Gurus: A Woman of Many Worlds. Blue Dolphin. ISBN 978-0-931892-49-3.
- Doggett, Peter (2011). You Never Give Me Your Money: The Beatles After the Breakup. New York, NY: It Books. ISBN 978-0-06-177418-8.
- The Editors of Rolling Stone (2002). Harrison. New York, NY: Rolling Stone Press. ISBN 978-0-7432-3581-5.
- Farrow, Mia (1997). What Falls Away. New York, NY: Doubleday. ISBN 978-0-385-40488-4.
- Fleetwood, Mick; Davis, Stephen (1991). Fleetwood: My Life and Adventures in Fleetwood Mac. New York, NY: Avon Books. ISBN 978-0-3807-1616-6.
- Frontani, Michael R. (2007). The Beatles: Image and the Media. Jackson, MS: University Press of Mississippi. ISBN 978-1-57806-966-8.
- Gaines, Steven (1995) [1986]. Heroes & Villains: The True Story of the Beach Boys. Boston, MA: Da Capo Press. ISBN 978-0-306-80647-6.
- Giuliano, Geoffrey; Giuliano, Avalon (2005). Revolver: The Secret History of the Beatles. London: John Blake. ISBN 978-1-84454-160-7.
- Goldberg, Philip (2010). American Veda: From Emerson and the Beatles to Yoga and Meditation – How Indian Spirituality Changed the West. New York, NY: Harmony Books. ISBN 978-0-385-52134-5.
- Goldman, Albert (2001) [1988]. The Lives of John Lennon. Chicago, IL: Chicago Review Press. ISBN 978-1-55652-399-1.
- Gould, Jonathan (2007). Can't Buy Me Love: The Beatles, Britain, and America. New York, NY: Harmony Books. ISBN 978-0-307-35337-5.
- Greene, Joshua M. (2006). Here Comes the Sun: The Spiritual and Musical Journey of George Harrison. Hoboken, NJ: John Wiley & Sons. ISBN 978-0-470-12780-3.
- Humes, Cynthia Ann (2005). "Maharishi Mahesh Yogi: Beyond the T.M. Technique". In Forsthoefel, Thomas A.; Humes, Cynthia Ann (eds.). Gurus in America. Albany, NY: SUNY Press. ISBN 0-7914-6573-X.
- Ingham, Chris (2006). The Rough Guide to the Beatles (2nd edn). London: Rough Guides. ISBN 978-1-84836-525-4.
- Jackson, Andrew Grant (2015). 1965: The Most Revolutionary Year in Music. New York, NY: Thomas Dunne Books. ISBN 978-1-250-05962-8.
- Kane, Larry (2005). Lennon Revealed. Philadelphia, PA: Running Press. ISBN 978-0-7624-2364-4.
- Lapham, Lewis (2005). With the Beatles. Brooklyn, NY: Melville House. ISBN 978-1-612193977.
- Lavezzoli, Peter (2006). The Dawn of Indian Music in the West. New York, NY: Continuum. ISBN 978-0-8264-1815-9.
- Leitch, Donovan (2005). The Autobiography of Donovan: The Hurdy Gurdy Man. New York, NY: St. Martin's Press. ISBN 978-0-312-35252-3.
- Leng, Simon (2006). While My Guitar Gently Weeps: The Music of George Harrison. Milwaukee, WI: Hal Leonard. ISBN 978-1-4234-0609-9.
- Lennon, Cynthia (1980). A Twist of Lennon. New York, NY: Avon Books. ISBN 978-0-38045450-1.
- Lennon, Cynthia (2005). John. New York, NY: Three Rivers Press. ISBN 978-0-307-33856-3.
- Love, Mike (2017). Good Vibrations: My Life as a Beach Boy. London: Faber & Faber. ISBN 978-0-571-32469-9.
- MacDonald, Ian (2007). Revolution in the Head: The Beatles' Records and the Sixties. Chicago, IL: Chicago Review Press. ISBN 978-1-55652-733-3.
- Mason, Paul (1994). The Maharishi: The Biography of the Man Who Gave Transcendental Meditation to the World. Rockport, MA: Element. ISBN 978-1-85230-571-0.
- Miles, Barry (1997). Paul McCartney: Many Years from Now. New York, NY: Henry Holt and Company. ISBN 0-8050-5249-6.
- Miles, Barry (2001). The Beatles Diary Volume 1: The Beatles Years. London: Omnibus Press. ISBN 0-7119-8308-9.
- Norman, Philip (2008). John Lennon: The Life. New York, NY: Ecco. ISBN 978-0-06-075402-0.
- Oldmeadow, Harry (2004). Journeys East: 20th Century Western Encounters with Eastern Religious Traditions. Bloomington, IN: World Wisdom. ISBN 978-0-941532-57-0.
- Paglia, Camille (Winter 2003). "Cults and Cosmic Consciousness: Religious Visions in the American 1960s". Arion: A Journal of Humanities and the Classics. 3rd. 10 (3): 57–111. JSTOR 20163901.
- Paytress, Mark (2003). "A Passage to India". Mojo Special Limited Edition: 1000 Days of Revolution (The Beatles' Final Years – Jan 1, 1968 to Sept 27, 1970). London: Emap. pp. 10–17.
- Quantick, David (2002). Revolution: The Making of The Beatles' White Album. Chicago, IL: A Cappella Books. ISBN 978-1-55652-470-7.
- Riley, Tim (2011). Lennon: The Man, the Myth, the Music – The Definitive Life. London: Random House. ISBN 978-0-7535-4020-6.
- Ryan, David Stuart (1982). John Lennon's Secret: A Biography. London: Kozmik Press. ISBN 978-0-905116-08-2.
- Saltzman, Paul (2000). The Beatles in Rishikesh. New York, NY: Viking Press. ISBN 978-0-670-89261-7.
- Schaffner, Nicholas (1978). The Beatles Forever. New York, NY: McGraw-Hill. ISBN 0-07-055087-5.
- Sheff, David (2000) [1981]. All We Are Saying: The Last Major Interview with John Lennon and Yoko Ono. New York, NY: St. Martin's Press. ISBN 0-312-25464-4.
- Shouler, Kenneth; Anthony, Susai (2009). The Everything Hinduism Book: Learn the Traditions and Rituals of the "Religion of Peace". Avon, MA: Adams Media. ISBN 978-1-59869-862-6.
- Shumsky, Susan (2018). Maharishi & Me: Seeking Enlightenment with the Beatles' Guru. New York, NY: Skyhorse Publishing. ISBN 978-1-5107-2268-2.
- Smith, Adam (1975). Powers of Mind. Random House. ISBN 0-394-49832-1.
- Sounes, Howard (2010). Fab: An Intimate Life of Paul McCartney. London: HarperCollins. ISBN 978-0-00-723705-0.
- Spitz, Bob (2005). The Beatles: The Biography. New York, NY: Little, Brown and Company. ISBN 978-0-316-80352-6.
- Syman, Stefanie (2010). The Subtle Body: The Story of Yoga in America. New York, NY: Farrar, Straus and Giroux. ISBN 978-0-374-23676-2.
- Tillery, Gary (2010). The Cynical Idealist: A Spiritual Biography of John Lennon. Wheaton, IL: Quest Books. ISBN 978-0-8356-0875-6.
- Tillery, Gary (2011). Working Class Mystic: A Spiritual Biography of George Harrison. Wheaton, IL: Quest Books. ISBN 978-0-8356-0900-5.
- Turner, Steve (2006). The Gospel According to the Beatles. Louisville, KY: Westminster John Knox Press. ISBN 978-0-664-22983-2.
- Winn, John C. (2009). That Magic Feeling: The Beatles' Recorded Legacy, Volume Two, 1966–1970. New York, NY: Three Rivers Press. ISBN 978-0-3074-5239-9.
- Woffinden, Bob (1981). The Beatles Apart. London: Proteus. ISBN 0-906071-89-5.
