= The Beatles and India =

Documentary film directed by Ajoy Bose

- Official release poster
- Directed by: Ajoy Bose, Peter Compton (co-director)
- Written by: Ajoy Bose, Peter Compton
- Produced by: Reynold D'Silva
- Starring: George Harrison; John Lennon; Paul McCartney; Ringo Starr
- Cinematography: Virendra Khanna
- Edited by: Ben Nugent
- Music by: Benji Merrison
- Production companies: Renoir Pictures; Silva Screen
- Distributed by: Channel 4
- Release date: 29 May 2021 (UK Asian Film Festival)
- Running time: 92 minutes
- Country: United Kingdom
- Language: English

The Beatles and India is a 2021 documentary film directed by Indian author and political journalist Ajoy Bose. It covers the Beatles' immersion in Indian culture and philosophy during the 1960s, including the band's 1968 stay in Rishikesh, and their influence on modern Indian culture.

The documentary's world premiere took place on 29 May 2021, to close the UK Asian Film Festival (UKAFF).

== Production ==
The film was inspired by Ajoy Bose's book Across the Universe: The Beatles in India, published in 2018, fifty years after the Beatles' highly publicised stay in Rishikesh, India. It was Bose's directorial debut. Cultural researcher Peter Compton co-directed and Reynold D'Silva, head of Silva Screen Music Group, produced the film.

Bose credited the film with being the "brainchild" of D'Silva, who had first considered such a documentary over 30 years before, when his music company was working with George Harrison's HandMade Films. According to Bose, the reopening of the Rishikesh ashram where the Beatles once stayed brought the idea forward, and D'Silva arranged for Bose and Compton to meet at the 2018 Monmouth University conference on the Beatles' self-titled double album (also known as the "White Album"). Bose and D'Silva then planned the project in Mumbai; by around mid 2019, production was underway with a research team, led by Compton, and a camera crew.

== Concept and themes ==
The Beatles and India explores the band's three-year immersion in Indian culture. Bose said he was keen to show that "the India part of the Beatles saga" was more substantial than merely the group's sojourn in Rishikesh and their studying Transcendental Meditation (TM) there under teacher Maharishi Mahesh Yogi.

The film covers lead guitarist George Harrison's first encounter with a sitar, while the Beatles were filming their Help! feature film, and his use of the instrument on John Lennon's song "Norwegian Wood" later in 1965; the band's stopover in Delhi in July 1966; Harrison's friendship with Indian classical musician Ravi Shankar, including their first meeting at the Asian Music Circle in London; the recording of Harrison's 1968 solo album Wonderwall Music in Bombay; and his leadership in the Beatles' interest in spiritual pursuits such as Transcendental Meditation. The group's 1968 retreat in Rishikesh – where they wrote most of the songs for the White Album – is recalled by fellow students from the time. In discussing the band's abrupt exit from the ashram, Beatles historians Mark Lewisohn and Steve Turner each highlight the disruptive role played by "Magic Alex" Mardas in spreading rumours of the Maharishi's alleged sexual impropriety towards a young female student.

The documentary also tells of the Beatles' impact on Indian youth. Discussing the film in The Guardian, Bose described the reciprocal influence as "Osmosis on both sides", adding: "And look at the paradox. The Beatles were tired of the west's commercialised capitalist culture and looking for spiritual peace, but we looked upon them as exciting symbols of modern culture." The band's early influence is shown in the contemporaneous pop group the Savages and actor Shammi Kapoor dancing in a Beatles wig in the 1965 film Janwar.

The Beatles and India includes input and recollections from 1960s Indian pop musicians. It also explores news reports from 1968 in which communist and socialist Indian politicians claimed that the Maharishi's ashram in Rishikesh was a camp run by the CIA. The film reveals that the KGB dispatched its agent Yuri Bezmenov to investigate the ashram. Footage from the late 1980s shows Bezmenov talking with satisfaction about how he believed TM students such as actress Mia Farrow unwittingly contributed to the destabilising of American society by returning home and disseminating a message of "sit down, look at your navel and do nothing".

== Release ==
The documentary's world premiere took place on 29 May 2021 at the Belgrade Theatre in Coventry, closing the UK Asian Film Festival (UKAFF) as part of Coventry's tenure as the UK City of Culture. It was then screened at the British Film Institute in London on 6 June to close UKAFF there.

The film's release followed that of a documentary focusing on the Beatles' 1968 stay at Rishikesh, Meeting the Beatles in India, directed by Paul Saltzman, who befriended the band during their TM course. In September 2021, Variety reported that Abacus Media Rights had sold distribution rights for The Beatles and India to Channel 4 in the UK, BritBox North America for the US and Canada, HBO Max for Latin America, Foxtel for Australia, Channel One for Russia, and A Contracorriente Films for Spain. The film's DVD release is scheduled for 29 October.

D’Silva's Silva Screen Records released the accompanying album The Beatles and India: Songs Inspired by the Film, consisting of recordings by contemporary Indian artists of songs written by Lennon, Paul McCartney and Harrison that reflect the band's absorption in Indian culture. The first track to be made available, in May, was Nikhil D'Souza's version of Lennon's "India, India". Karsh Kale and Benny Dayal's recording of McCartney's "Mother Nature's Son" was issued as a second single in August. Other artists contributing to the album include Dhruv Ghanekar, Anoushka Shankar, Soulmate, Maalavika Manoj, Shibani Dandekar, Anupam Roy, Raaga Trippin', Farhan Ahktar, Lisa Mishra, Siddharth Basrur, Parekh & Singh, Vishal Dadlani and Monica Dogra.

== Critical reception ==
Reviewing for UK Film Review, William Hemingway gives the film four stars out of five and welcomes its broader perspective on the Beatles' interaction with Indian culture, relative to Saltzman's Meeting the Beatles in India. Hemingway describes Bose's film as "a stunning portrait not just of the Beatles but of India, too" and praises the director's insightful and measured handling of the band's association with the Maharishi. In his three-star review in The Guardian, Peter Bradshaw calls it an "engaging documentary", adding that although many of the details might be familiar, "it's still salutary to be reminded of how these four young men ... used their colossal influence, greater than any politician or movie star or religious leader, to direct the world's attention to India, a country which until then had been opaque for many in the west."

Pete Paphides of Uncut gives the film three-and-a-half stars out of five and comments that it "suspends current censoriousness to catapult us to a world where it wasn't unforgivable to get things wrong about other cultures as long as you were trying to get it right". He admires the warmth evident in Harrison and Shankar's relationship and welcomes the "corrective to pernicious inaccuracies" surrounding the Beatles' falling out with the Maharishi in Rishikesh. Paphides concludes:

But perhaps the most pleasing harmonic balance established by The Beatles and India only truly reveals itself near the end, as an array of Indian musicians try to express just how the group's music impacted upon them ... Over 50 years later, what survives is gratitude on all sides that the Beatles and the Indian musicians, teachers and fans they met got to be part of each other's story.

Among other reviews, Little White Lies calls the film "enlightening" and "engaging", while Shindig! describes it as "impressive" and "a world apart from anything resembling your stereotypical Beatles documentary".

== See also ==
- The Beatles in India
- Meeting the Beatles in India (2020 documentary)
