= Meeting the Beatles in India =

2020 documentary film

- Directed by: Paul Saltzman
- Written by: Paul Saltzman
- Starring: Paul Saltzman; Lewis Lapham; Jodi Lascar
- Cinematography: Stephen Chandler Whitehead
- Edited by: Amanda I. Kirpaul
- Music by: Craig Pruess; Russell Walker
- Release date: 2020
- Running time: 82 minutes
- Countries: Canada; India; United Kingdom; United States
- Language: English

Meeting the Beatles in India is a 2020 documentary film directed by Paul Saltzman. The film recounts Saltzman's week in India during the Beatles' stay in Rishikesh in February 1968, when the band studied Transcendental Meditation with Maharishi Mahesh Yogi. The film is introduced by Morgan Freeman, with narration primarily provided by Saltzman.

The documentary features interviews with filmmaker David Lynch, Beatles historian Mark Lewisohn, photographer and former model Pattie Boyd and her sister Jenny Boyd, and Richard A. Cooke III, an American visitor to Rishikesh whose tiger hunt inspired John Lennon's song "The Continuing Story of Bungalow Bill". The film also includes appearances by Saltzman's daughter Devyani, whose encouragement led him to develop and revisit the photographs he took during the trip decades later. The films features many of the photos Saltzman took during his stay. As the documentary was not sanctioned by Apple Corps, it does not feature licensed Beatles music or new interviews with the surviving members of the band.

Meeting the Beatles in India had its virtual world premiere on 9 September 2020 via the Gathr Films platform. The film received positive reviews from critics.

== Reception ==
Meeting the Beatles in India received generally positive reviews from critics. On the review aggregator Rotten Tomatoes, it holds a 100% approval rating. Marc Glassman, writing for the Canadian documentary magazine POV, described the film as "purely authentic", observing that the filmmaker "still seems to be sorting out what happened during that week in Rishikesh".

Writing for Variety, Chris William commented that the film does not address allegations of sexual impropriety involving Maharishi Mahesh Yogi during the Beatles' stay in India, and described its treatment of Transcendental Meditation as relatively shallow. He nevertheless concluded that "there's some fan value here, all spiritual quests aside, in seeing how accepting the individual Beatles could be of someone they might otherwise have viewed as an interloper in their lofty midst."

== See also ==
- The Beatles in India
- The Beatles and India (2021 documentary)
