= Beatles Ashram =

Ashram in India

Coordinates: 30°06′35″N 78°18′46″E

Beatles Ashram (बीटल्स आश्रम), also known as Chaurasi Kutia (चौरासी कुटिया), is an ashram close to the north Indian city of Rishikesh in the state of Uttarakhand. It is located on the eastern bank of the Ganges river, opposite the Muni Ki Reti area of Rishikesh, in the foothills of the Himalayas. During the 1960s and 1970s, as the International Academy of Meditation, it was the training centre for students of Maharishi Mahesh Yogi, who devised the Transcendental Meditation technique. The ashram gained international attention between February and April 1968 when the English rock band the Beatles studied meditation there, along with celebrities such as Donovan, Mia Farrow and Mike Love. It was the setting for the band's most productive period as songwriters, where they composed most of the songs for their self-titled double album, also known as the "White Album".

The site was abandoned in the 1990s and reverted to the local forestry department in 2003, after which it became a popular visiting place for fans of the Beatles. Although derelict and overrun by jungle, the site was officially opened to the public in December 2015. It is now known as Beatles Ashram and held an exhibition in February 2018 to celebrate the 50th anniversary of the Beatles' arrival in Rishikesh.

== Background and location ==
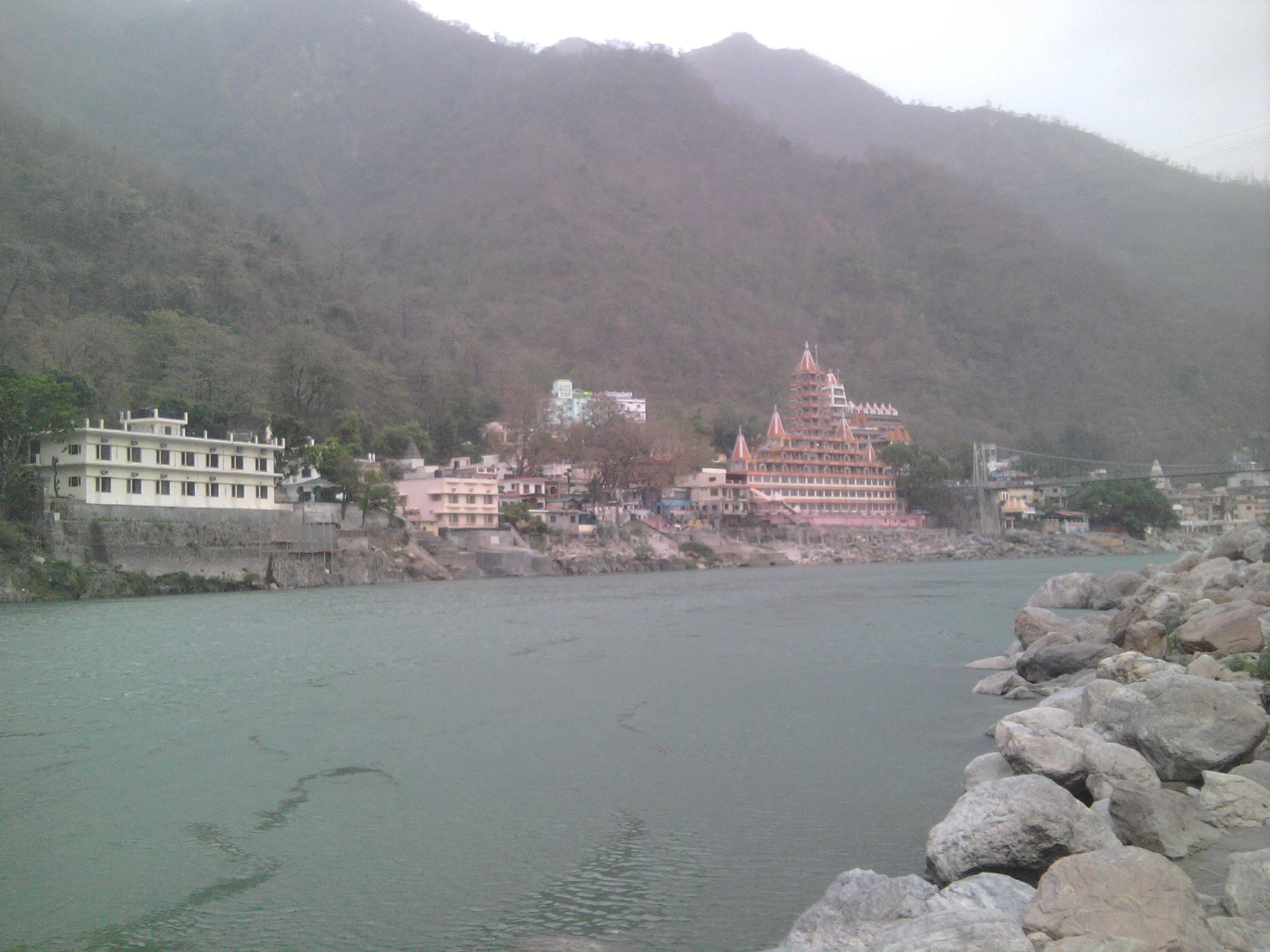
View of Jonk, the village on the eastern side of Lakshman Jhula footbridge

Maharishi Mahesh Yogi leased the site from the state forestry department of Uttar Pradesh in 1961. It sits on a 150 feet (46 m)-high cliff overlooking the Ganges river, on a hill known as Manikoot, and comprises 14 acres (57,000 m^{2}) of land surrounded by jungle. The facility was built in 1963 with a $100,000 gift from American heiress Doris Duke. Referred to locally as the Chaurasi Kutia ashram, and by some meditators as Shankaracharya Nagar, it was named the "International Academy of Meditation" by the Maharishi. It was one of many ashrams in the Rishikesh area, which is a place of religious significance and known as the "yoga capital of the world".

The ashram is located due east of the Muni Ki Reti area of Rishikesh, in the north of the city, and on the opposite bank of the river. In the late 1960s, access to the cliff-top facility was possible via the Lakshman Jhula footbridge, 5 kilometres (3.1 mi) north-east of the centre of Rishikesh, at the village of Tapovan, followed by a 2-mile walk back downriver and a steep climb up the rocky path to Manikoot. Alternatively, a ferry service was available, from close to what is now the Ram Jhula suspension bridge, built in 1986. Before the opening of Ram Jhula, vehicles crossed the Ganges over the narrow bridge at Haridwar, south of Rishikesh, and then travelled 13 miles along a twisty and potholed dirt road to the ashram.

In November 2020, the Janki Setu (or Sita Pul) bridge opened to the public. The 274-metre bridge allows access for two-wheelers and pedestrians, and further reduces the distance to the ashram.

== Facilities ==
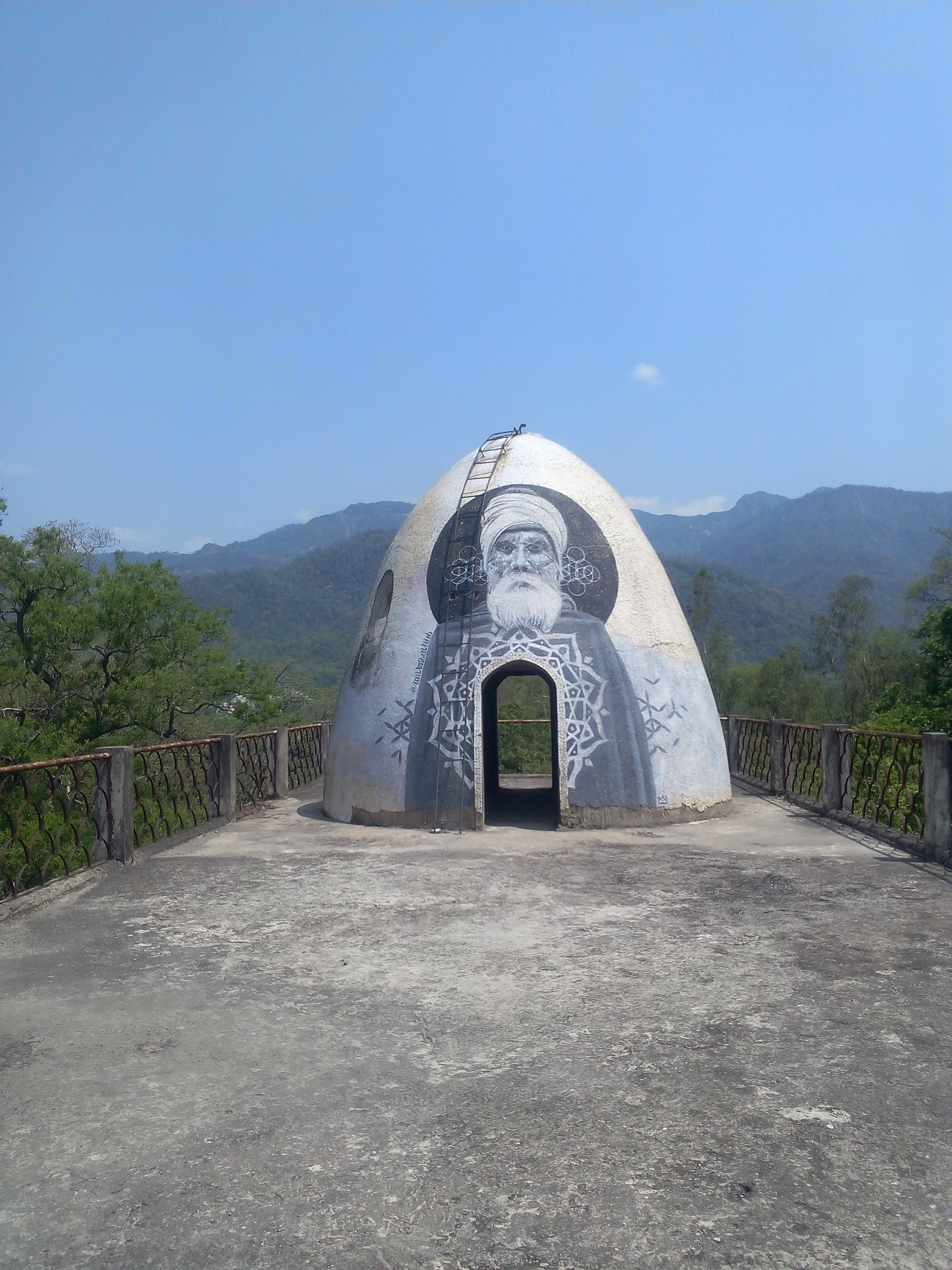
Rooftop meditation dome (pictured in 2017)

The training centre was designed to suit Western habits and was described variously as "luxurious" and "seedy". It was built to accommodate several dozen people and each of its stone bungalows contained five rooms. According to author Susan Shumsky, a TM devotee whose first retreat at the ashram was in 1970, the facility was "under constant construction". In addition to several stone huts, there were accommodation blocks, known as puri, each containing six self-contained rooms. The Maharishi's residence was a long, modern-style bungalow located away from the other buildings. According to journalist Raymond Zhong, who visited the site in 2015, the name Chaurasi Kutia is Hindi for "84 Huts". He also comments on the less traditional design aspects: "One four-story building has a stepped pyramid design and multifoil arches above the doorways, and on the roof there are massive white structures shaped like ostrich eggs ..." Shumsky writes that the Maharishi's bungalow was a "simple brick, concrete, and stone" building, and far from the lavish accommodation commonly depicted in the media in the aftermath to the Beatles' stay at the ashram. (Note: Following his visit to the abandoned site in the late 1990s, Beatles biographer Geoffrey Giuliano wrote: "It was not at all the 'million-dollar staccato house' to which John Lennon had referred ... What struck me was how often writers like myself, without any first-hand knowledge, exaggerated John's description that this house was some kind of great mansion with a helipad!")

The compound was surrounded by a wire fence, which served as a barrier against the abundant wildlife in the interior. Beyond the fence, the forest was thick with teak, guava and sissoso trees, while inside were gardens filled with flowerbeds of red hibiscus. At the entrance to the site, there was a gatehouse, signposted as the "Inquiry Office", and a white picket fence inside the wire fence. Along the cliff edge, a path led down to the shoreline.

The Maharishi addressed his students in the two-storey lecture hall. This high-ceilinged structure had long windows that, as with its roof, provided a popular habitat for birds and monkeys. The kitchen block was towards the rear of the site. Meals were taken communally in an open dining area, over which stood a wooden trellis.

For the Beatles' stay in early 1968, according to one of the Maharishi's aides at the time, Ravindra Damodara, four small stone-covered buildings were constructed along the path down from the main centre to the ashram gates. These dome-shaped "caves" included a raised platform, accessed by ladder, on which each Beatle could engage in advanced meditation. During the same period, the Maharishi was negotiating with the Indian government to convert some nearby parkland into an airstrip for a Beechcraft aeroplane that he had been given. Several thousand landless peasants objected to this deal, as they had been denied the use of the land for farming.

== The Beatles' stay ==
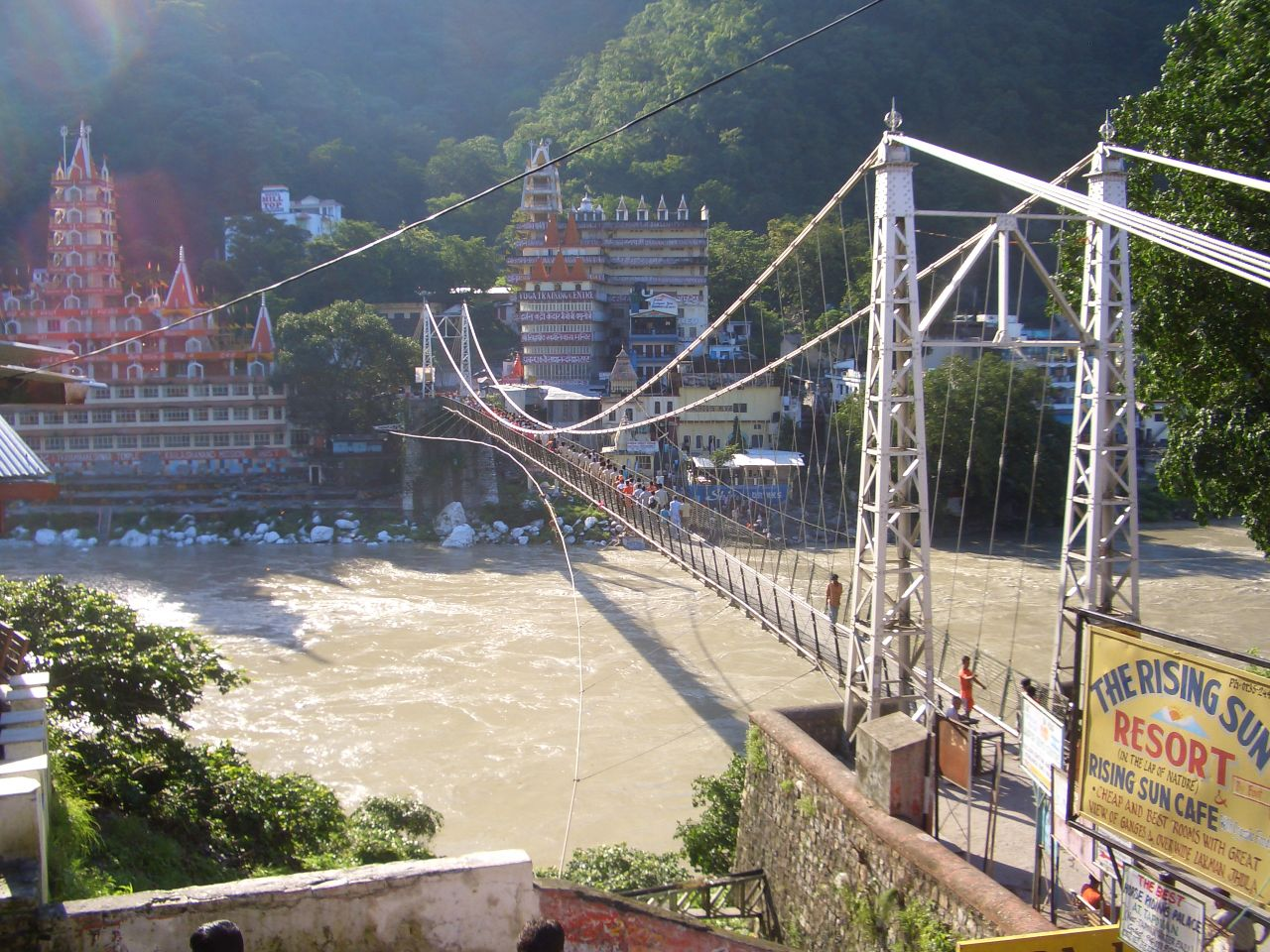
Lakshman Jhula footbridge, pictured from the village of Tapovan

The Beatles' decision to study Transcendental Meditation in India brought international renown to the ashram and to Rishikesh. The band and their entourage travelled there in two separate groups. George Harrison and John Lennon, together with their respective wives, Pattie Boyd and Cynthia Lennon, and Boyd's sister Jenny, arrived in Delhi on 16 February 1968. They then travelled the 150 miles (240 km) to Rishikesh by taxi, a six-hour journey. Recalling their arrival, Harrison said: "Rishikesh is an incredible place, situated where the Ganges flows out of the Himalayas into the plains between the mountains and Delhi. There is quite a hefty flow of water coming out of the Himalayas, and we had to cross the river by a big swing suspension bridge [the Lakshman Jhula]." The Beatles were followed by a retinue of reporters and photographers, who were mostly kept out of the fenced and gated compound. Scottish singer-songwriter Donovan arrived soon after the Beatles, and Mia Farrow, Mike Love of the Beach Boys and jazz flautist Paul Horn were among the dozens of other meditators, all of them Europeans or Americans. (Note: Love recalled crossing the Ganges on "a little scow, not even really a boat". He said of the atmosphere in Rishikesh: "The area around us was called the Valley of the Saints, with the Himalayas rising up around it ... You could feel that this was a place where people had been coming to meditate since ancient times.") One of the Beatles' friends, Alexis "Magic Alex" Mardas, an electronics engineer and inventor, was summoned to Rishikesh in the hope of providing the ashram with a high-power radio transmitter to broadcast the Maharishi's message.

The bungalows allotted to the Beatles were equipped with electric heaters, running water, toilets, and English-style furniture. According to Nancy Cooke de Herrera, an American devotee who was assigned to look after the Western celebrities, the Maharishi obtained many "special items" from a nearby village so that the Beatles' rooms would have mirrors, wall-to-wall carpeting, wall coverings, foam mattresses and bedspreads. (Note: Cooke de Herrera later wrote that, compared to the other students' bungalows, the Beatles' residences "looked like a palace".) Ringo Starr later compared the ashram to "a kind of spiritual Butlins", a low-cost British holiday camp. The Beatles adopted native dress, and the ashram had a tailor on the premises to make clothes for the students. Members of their party shopped in local towns and bought saris for themselves and material to be made into shirts and jackets for the men. These towns included Dehradun and Mussoorie, where markets were held by Tibetans who had been driven out of their homeland by Chinese encroachment into Tibet.

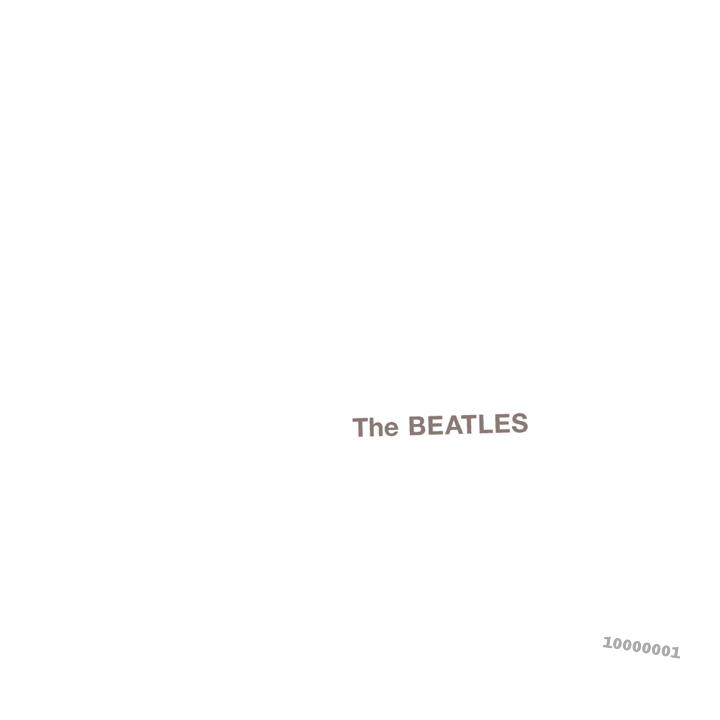
The cover of The Beatles

Having ordered several Indian instruments for delivery from Delhi, Harrison commandeered one of the bungalows for a music room. He invited all the students to participate, and musical get-togethers took place on the roof of the building. The stay at the ashram turned out to be the Beatles' most creative period for song writing. Many of their new songs were inspired by nature and reflected the simplicity of the surroundings. With Lennon and Paul McCartney especially productive during the retreat, the songs later comprised the bulk of the band's 1968 double album The Beatles, also known as the "White Album". (Note: Among the songs written at the ashram but not recorded by the Beatles, Harrison wrote "Dehradun" about the nearby town. Lennon subsequently paid tribute to their time at the ashram in "The Happy Rishikesh Song" and "India, India".) In the 2021 documentary film The Beatles and India, TM devotee Nick Nugent recalls the band performing a rooftop concert at the ashram, anticipating their well-known concert on top of the Apple Corps building in January 1969.

Harrison and Lennon were the most dedicated of the Beatles to meditation, and they were the last members of the band to depart from the ashram. They left on 12 April amid an atmosphere of recrimination towards the Maharishi, based on rumours of his alleged impropriety with some of the female students, and the two band members' misgivings that he was taking advantage of the Beatles' fame. Despite their subsequent repudiation of the Maharishi, the Beatles' stay at the ashram generated wide interest in Transcendental Meditation, which encouraged the study of Eastern spirituality in Western popular culture. Asked if he forgave the Beatles for their slight on his reputation, following Harrison's personal apology in 1991, the Maharishi replied, "I could never be upset with angels."

== Abandonment and development proposals ==
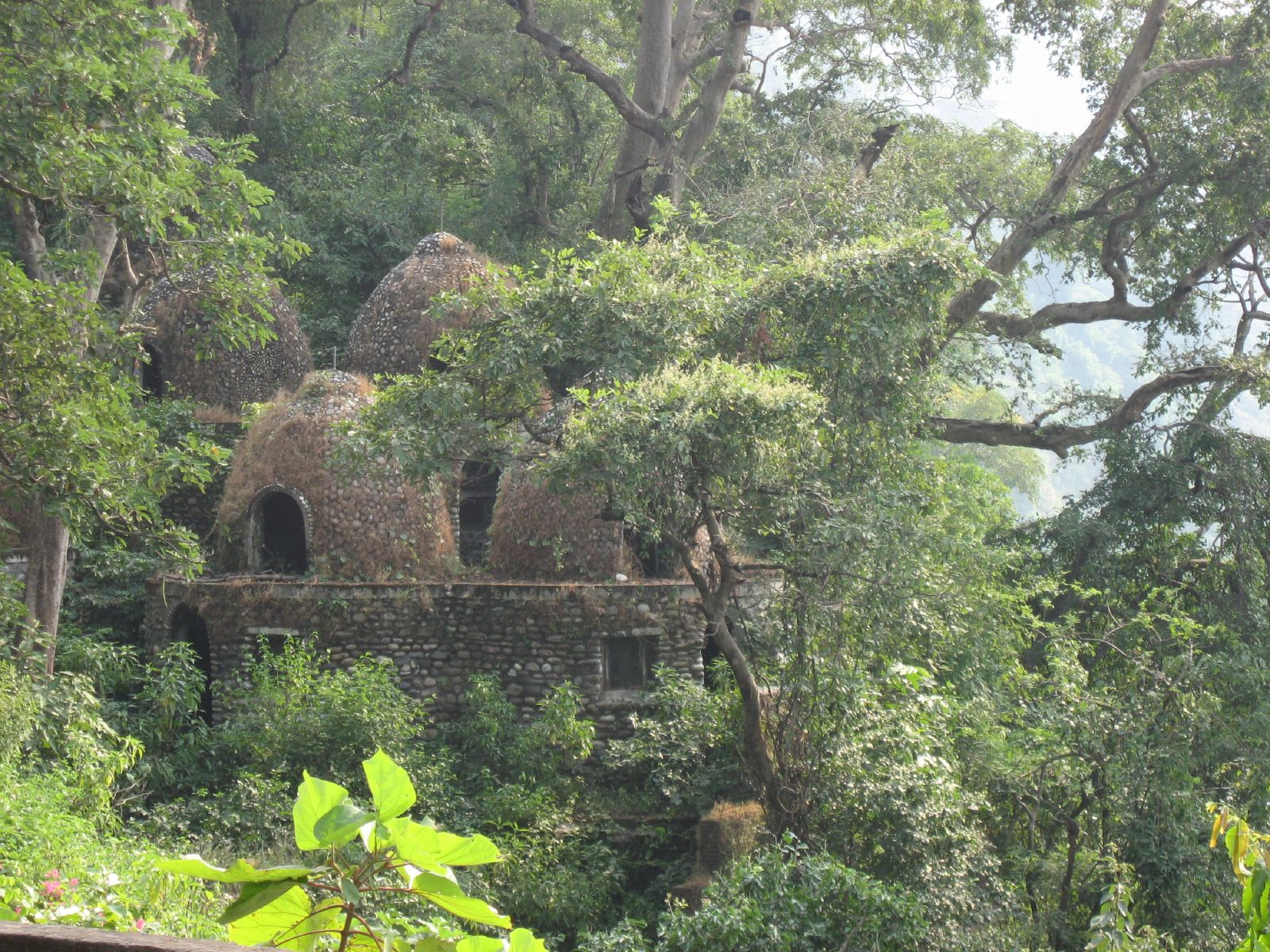
Stone meditation "caves" at the former International Academy of Meditation (pictured in 2006)

The Maharishi stopped using the ashram during the 1970s. With the lease having expired in 1981, the land was reclaimed by the government in the mid 1990s as part of what is now Rajaji Tiger Reserve. The former ashram then fell into disrepair, as a result of vandalism and the encroachment of the jungle. In 2003, Jerry Hall produced a television series for the BBC titled Gurus, which included interviews with TM initiates such as Cooke de Herrera, and a visit to the ashram in Rishikesh. In 2007, Canadian actress Maggie Blue O'Hara announced plans to renovate and convert the property into a home for the street children of New Delhi.

The future of the site became a topic of political debate at the state and national levels. In 2011, a plan was announced by the state government of Uttarakhand to build an Ayush Gram there. Its potential as a tourist attraction was a popular campaign issue for several candidates during the 2012 Uttarakhand Legislative Assembly election. In the 2009 Indian general election, Satpal Maharaj had raised the importance of retaining "the rich spirituality of the area" and in 2013 he vowed to preserve the "glorious history of the Beatles" represented by Chaurasi Kutia.

== Public opening and adoption as Beatles Ashram ==
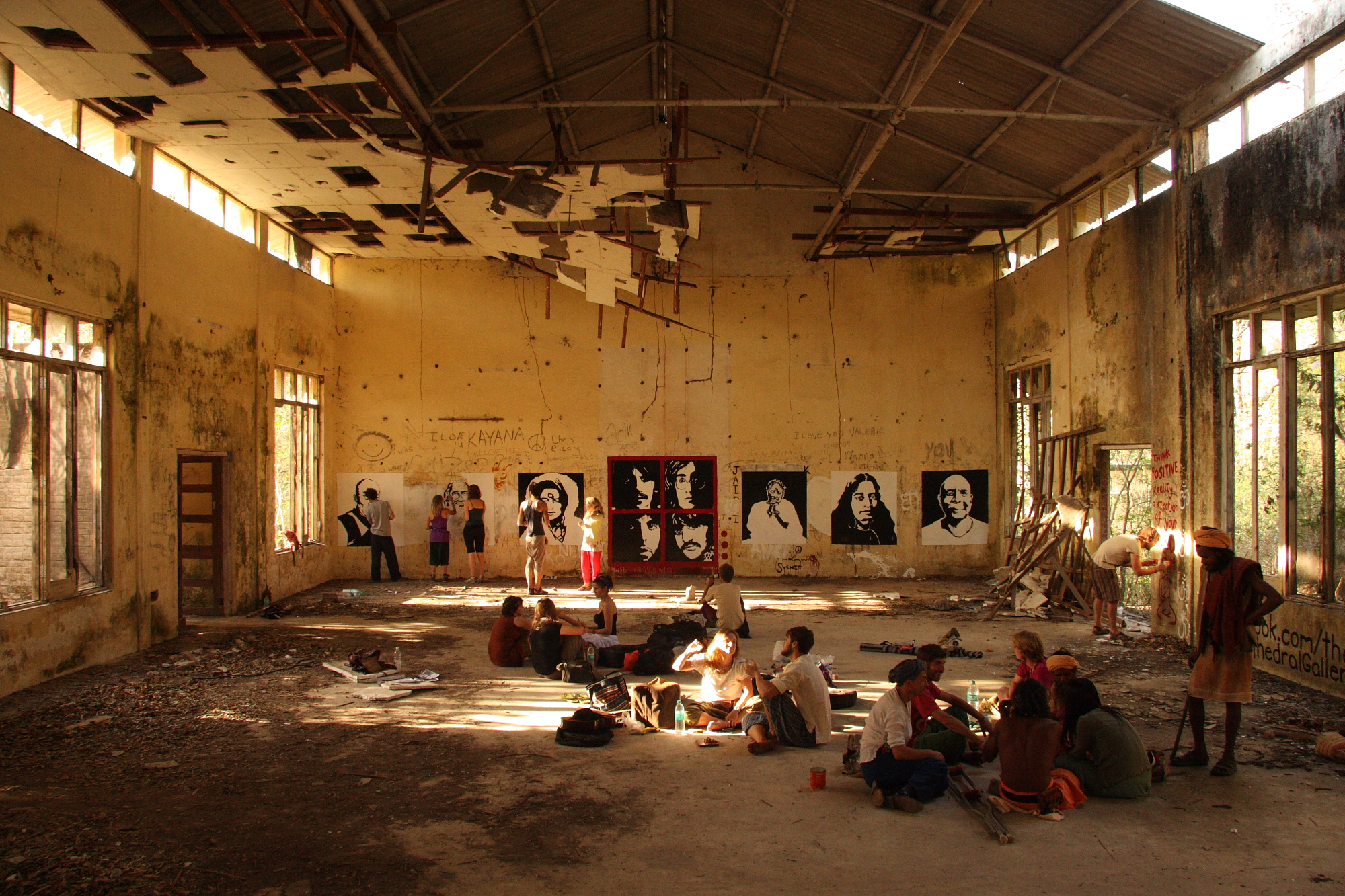
"Beatles Cathedral" artists in the ashram's dilapidated lecture hall, in 2012

From the 1990s, trespassers on the ashram site had taken to leaving graffiti as a tribute to the Beatles. In 2012, street artist Pan Trinity Das founded "The Beatles Cathedral Gallery" with the aim of "re-activating" Satsang Hall, the property's former lecture hall, but his and others' efforts were curtailed by officials from the forestry department.

In early December 2015, the ashram was officially opened to the public, with an entrance fee of 150 rupees for Indian people and 650 rupees for other nationalities. Coinciding with this event, the director of the Rajaji Tiger Reserve stated his intention to preserve the existing buildings as "heritage structures" while Dinesh Agrawal, the foreign minister for Uttarakhand, said: "Our aim is to ensure that visitors don't simply come for the Beatles connection but to learn the magic of nature, meditation and yoga." Aside from viewing the ashram ruins, nature walks and bird-watching tours were available to visitors. Reporting on the opening for The Wall Street Journal, Raymond Zhong described the ashram as "One of the most storied locations in Beatles lore". He said that the Cathedral Gallery was the "main attraction" and a "showcase for some accomplished graphic art". As of March 2025 the entrance fee for foreigners is 1200 rupees. When entering one collects a ticket from the guard at the gate, which then must be returned when exiting the ashram. Also, there are no walks nor bird-watching tours available.

In February 2016, the Cathedral Gallery initiative was reborn as the Beatles Ashram Mural Project, when four artists, including Das, were invited to produce a series of murals for the hall. Another of the artists, Miles Toland, said he sought to pay tribute to the Maharishi in his work, which depicts spiritually themed scenes he first photographed in Rishikesh. (Note: Among the works contributed by Das and others in 2012, and retained by the forestry department for the ashram opening three years later, were pop art images, pictures of the four Beatles, and a portrait of the Dalai Lama.)

In February 2018, the 50th anniversary of Lennon and Harrison's arrival in Rishikesh was marked by the opening of a two-year exhibition titled The Beatles in India at the Beatles Story museum in Liverpool. A similar celebration took place at Chaurasi Kutia, now known as Beatles Ashram, further to the announcement of plans for a full renovation of the site and the founding of a museum dedicated to the Beatles and the Maharishi. (Note: January 2018 also marked the 100th anniversary of the late Maharishi's birth. Among the measures announced in September 2017 by the forestry department was to secure the boundary with the tiger reserve, as a barrier against the intrusion of tigers, elephants and leopards. Satpal Maharaj, as state tourism minister, said he hoped to stage a concert beside the Ganges as a tribute to the Beatles.) The exhibition in Liverpool featured memorabilia, photographs from the 1968 retreat by Paul Saltzman, a sitar courtesy of the Ravi Shankar Foundation, and video contributions from Pattie and Jenny Boyd. The 2018 International Yoga Festival, held in Rishikesh from 1 March, dedicated three days of its program to acknowledge the anniversary of the Beatles' visit.

== Gallery ==
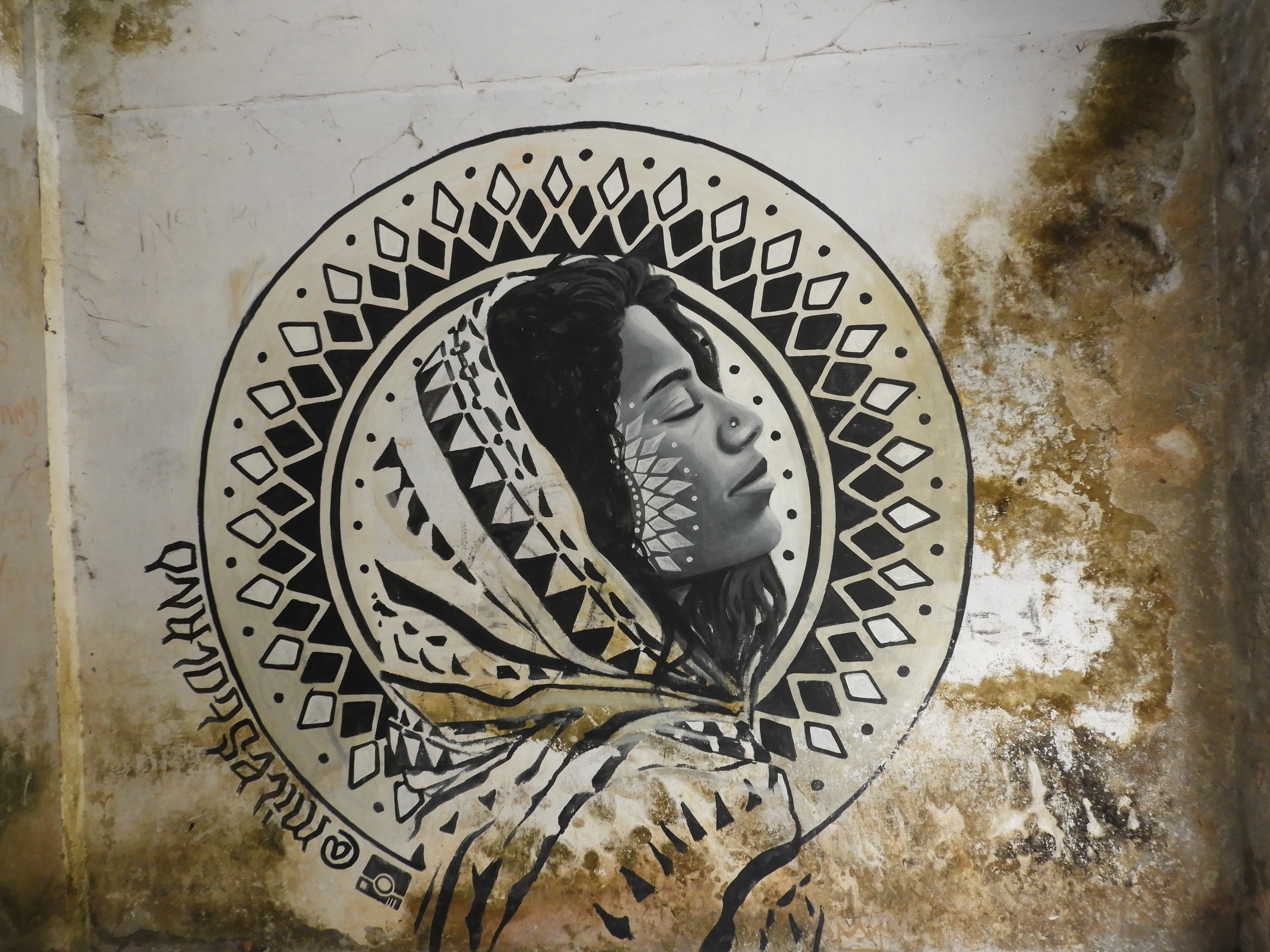
Mural created by visiting artists for the Beatles Ashram Mural Project

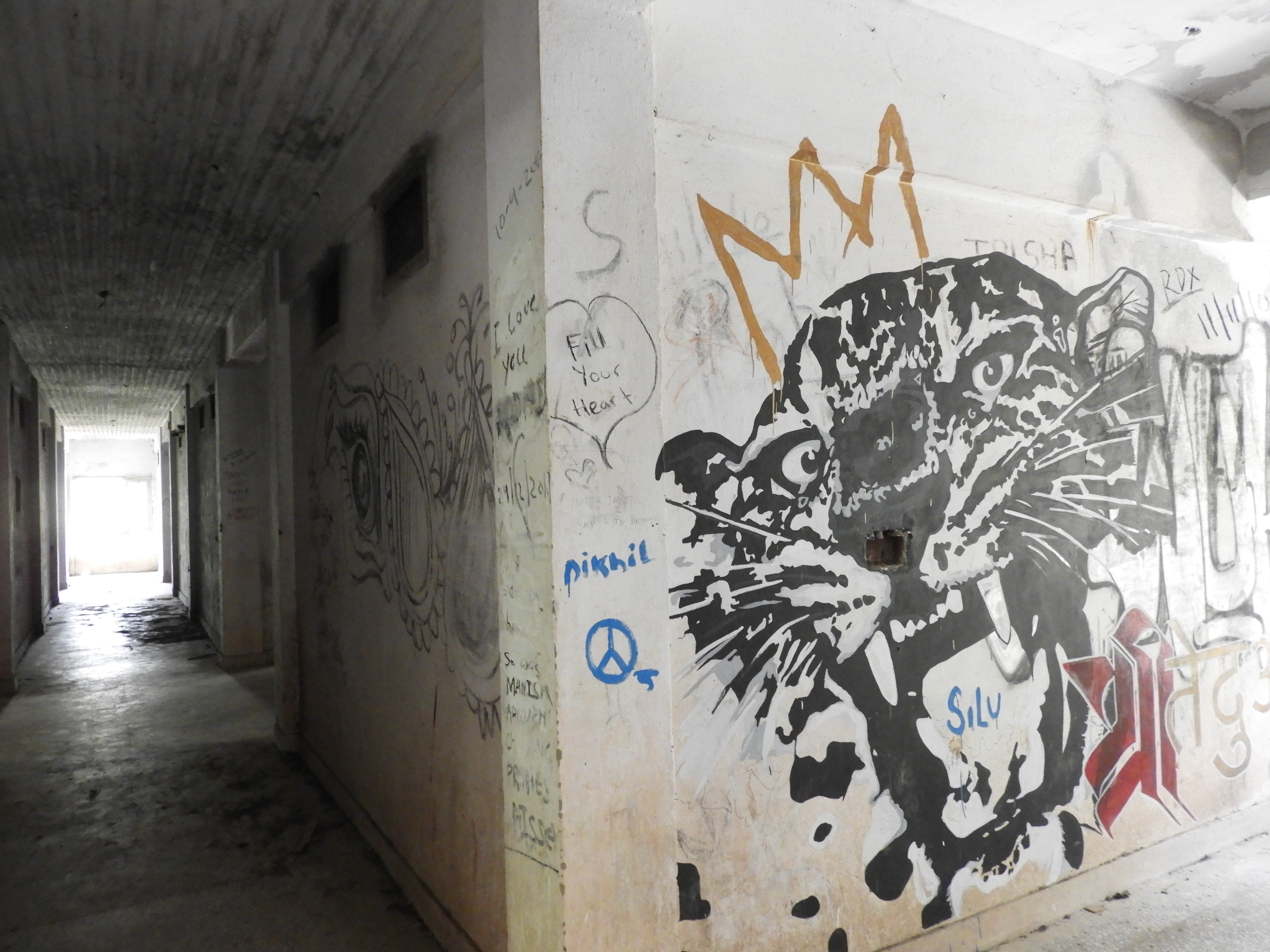
More artwork in the abandoned ashram

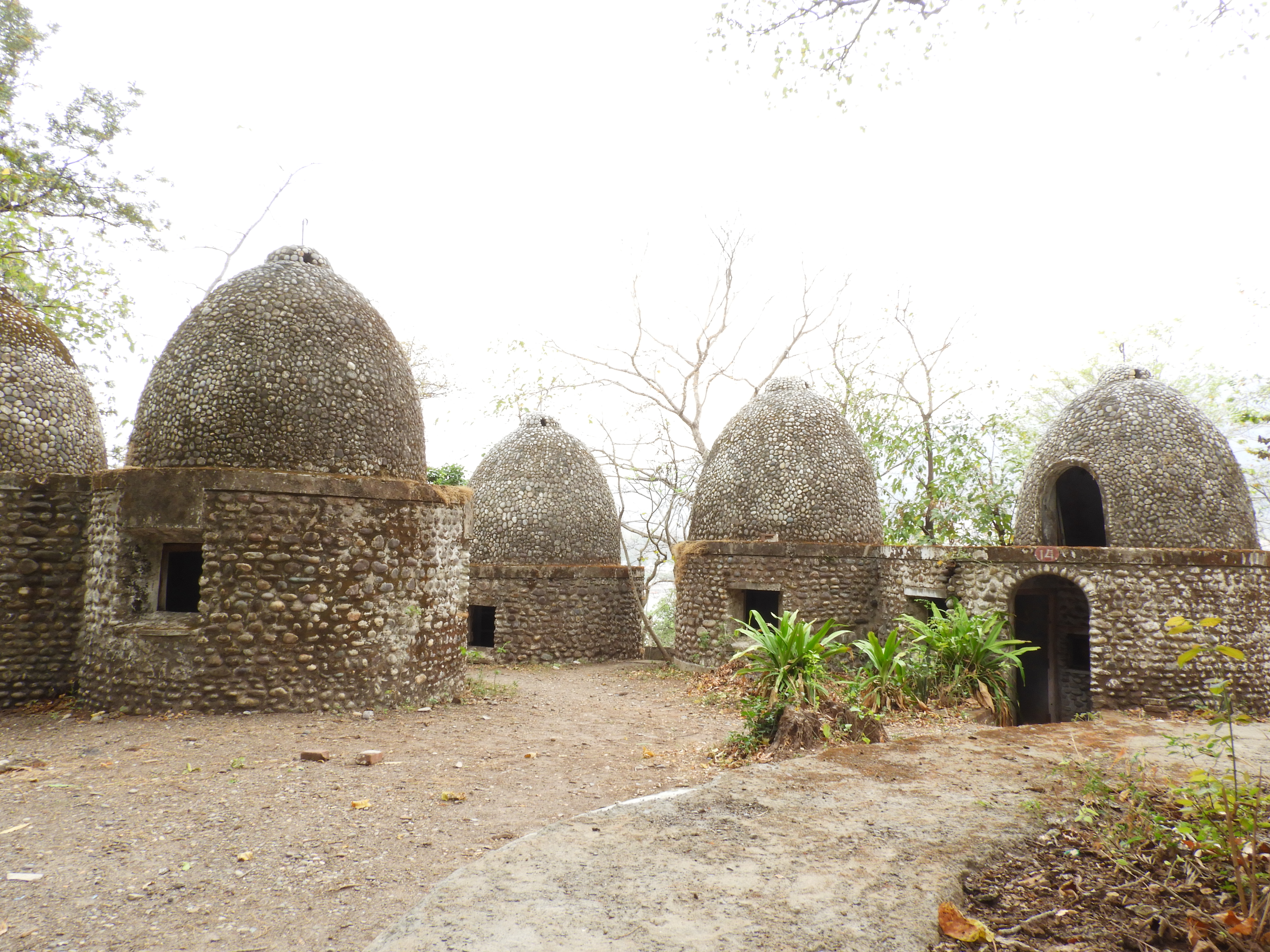
Meditation "caves" built in 1976–1978 using stones from the Ganges

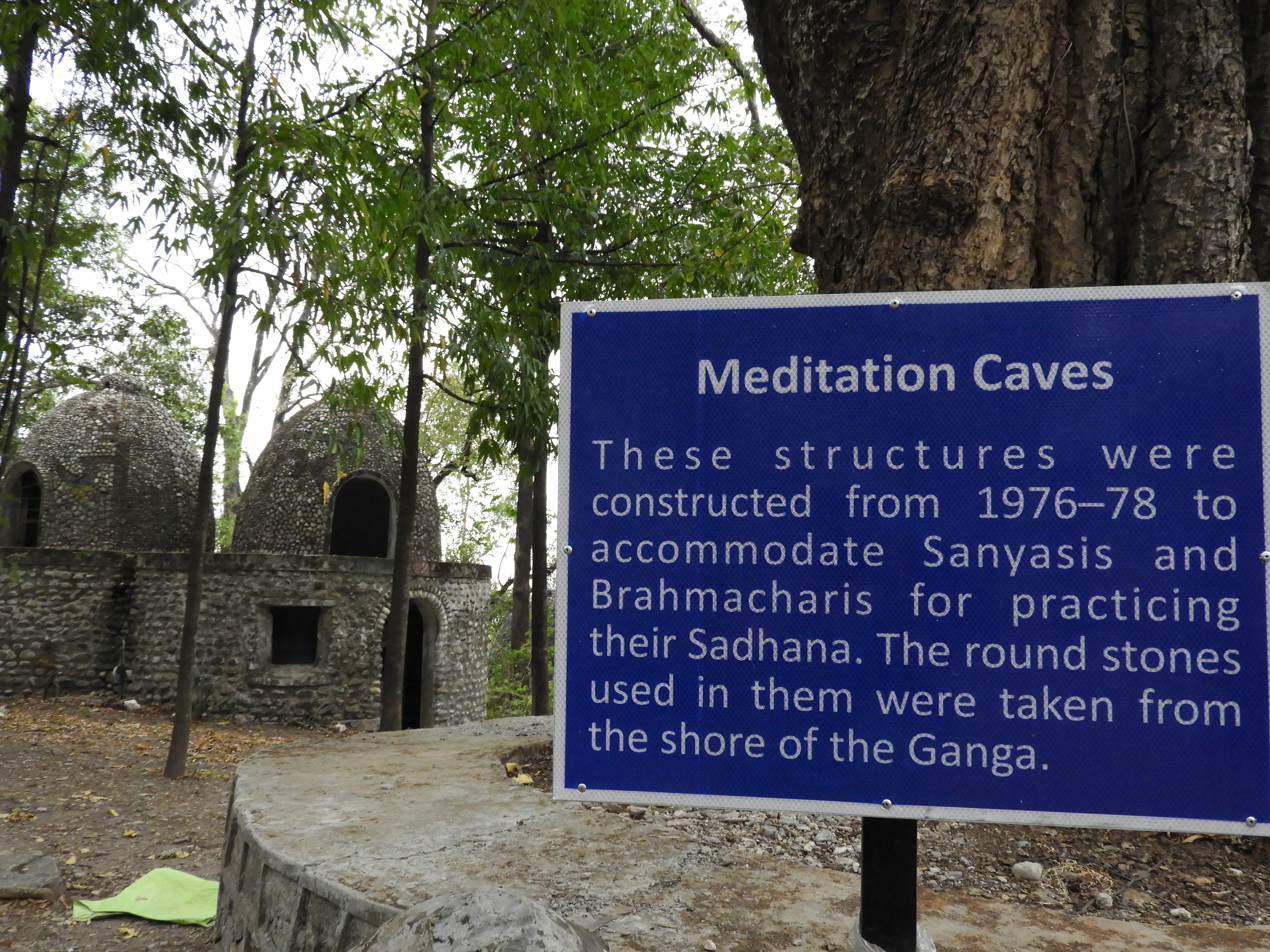
Information sign in front of the meditation caves

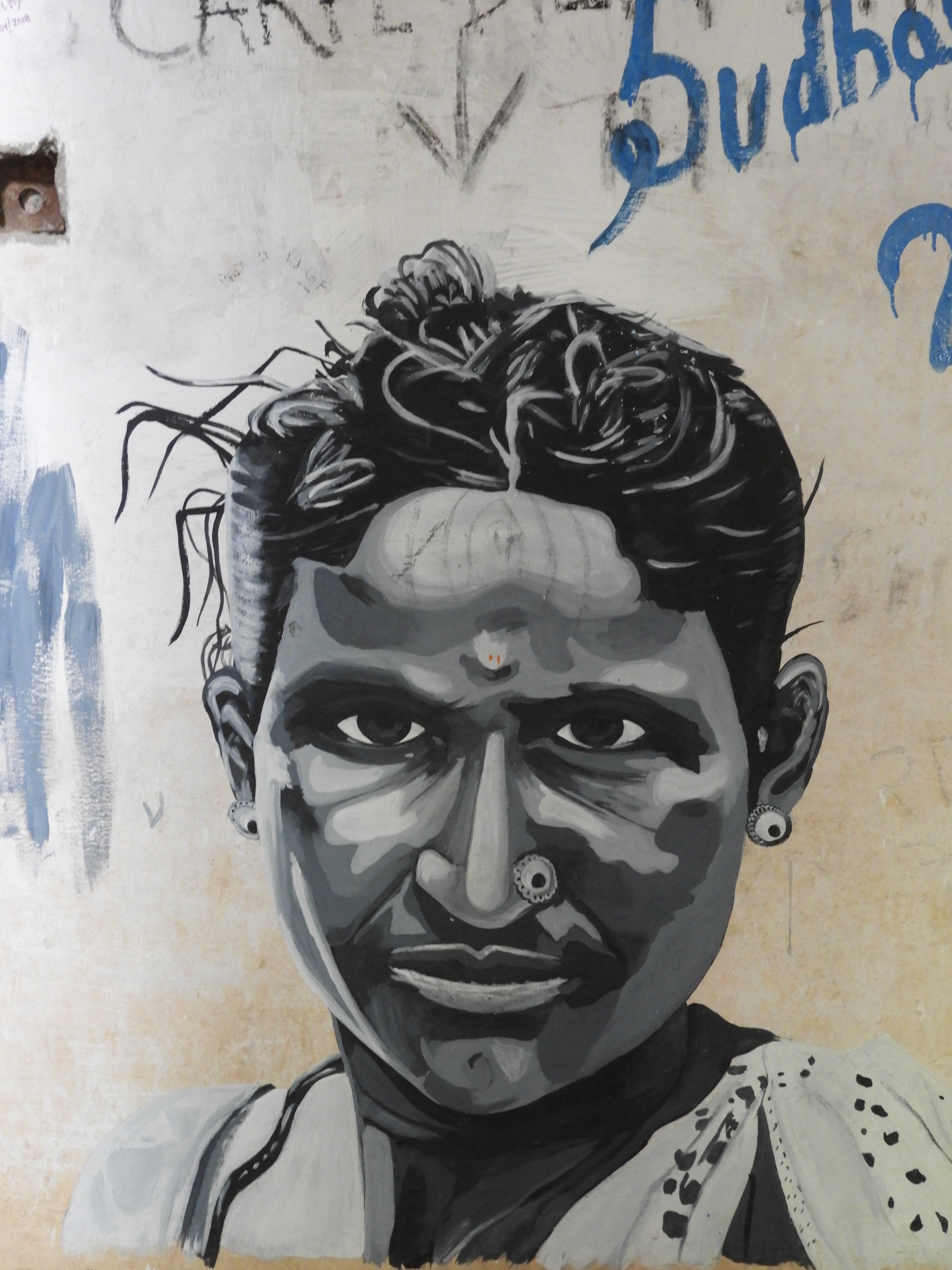
Another mural created in the 2010s

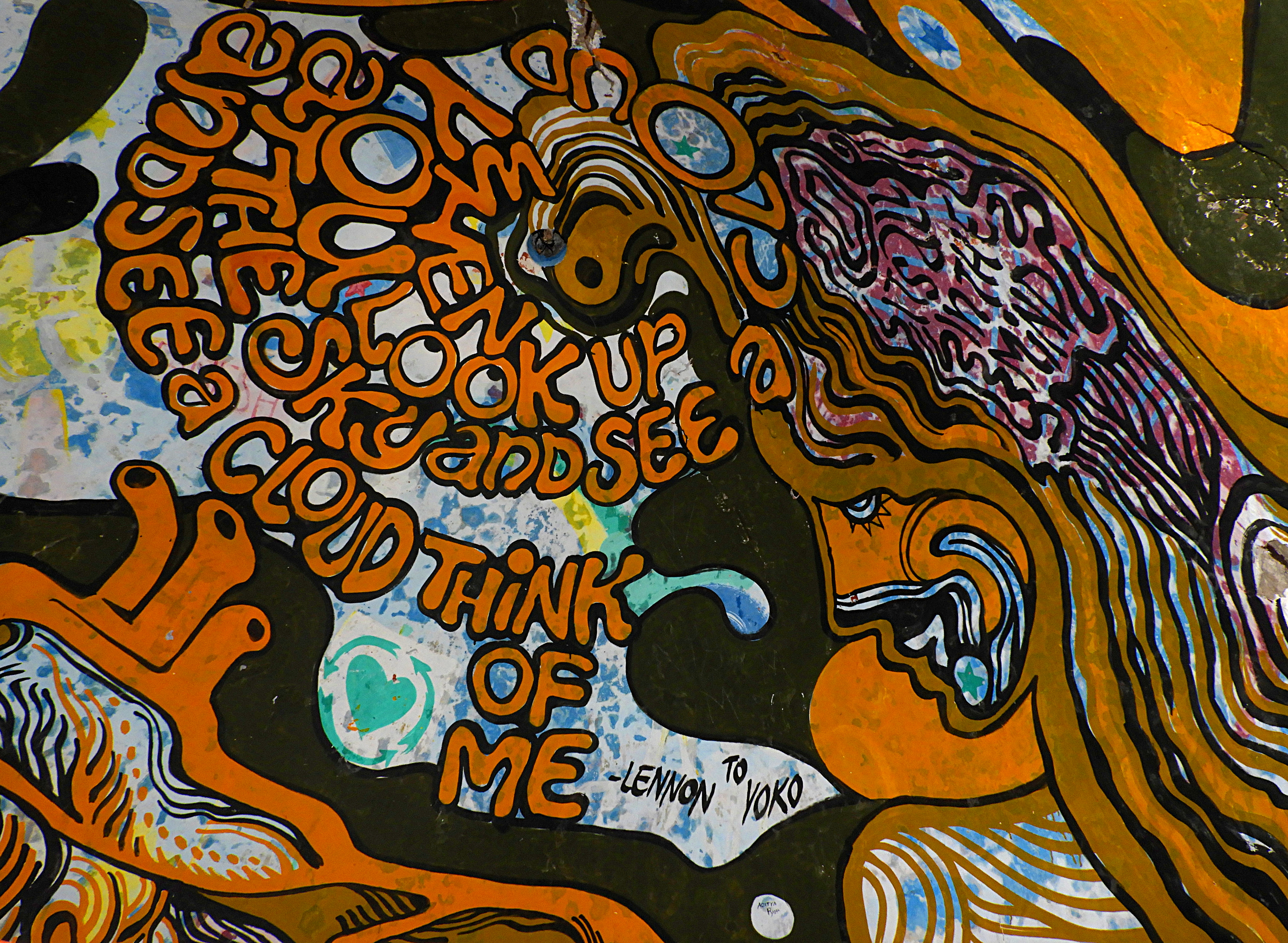
Graffiti on the ceiling of meditation cave remembering John Lennon and Yoko Ono's love
