= Nancy Cooke de Herrera =

American socialite and writer (1922–2013)

- Born: Nancy L. Veitch; April 12, 1922; Alameda County, California
- Died: February 28, 2013 (aged 90); Beverly Hills, California
- Occupation(s): Socialite, author
- Spouse(s): Richard Cooke (1941), Luis de Herrera (1951), Tony Jackson (1962)
- Children: One daughter, three sons

Nancy Cooke de Herrera (born Nancy Veitch, 1922–2013) was an American socialite, fashion expert, and author of three books, including All You Need Is Love: An Eyewitness Account of When Spirituality Spread from the East to the West.

== Early life and education ==
De Herrera grew up in Piedmont, California, the daughter of a naval officer and Oakland, California, businessman and banker, "Captain" Edward Veitch. She attended Piedmont High School with her lookalike sisters, Ardagh and Doryce, and studied bacteriology at Stanford University for three years during the 1940s (Class of '43).

== Adult life ==
De Herrera traveled to Molokai in Hawaii via a military convoy and married Richard Cooke, the son of a well-known missionary family in 1941. As the wife of a prominent family member, she performed hostess duties for Admiral Nimitz, Admiral Halsey, and Admiral Towers during World War II. She gave birth to three sons and divorced her husband after nine years of marriage.

While in Paris in 1951, she met a member of the American team that raced at Le Mans, named Luis de Herrera, whom she married a year later. The couple moved to Herrera's home country of Argentina and had a daughter in 1954. Nine months later her husband, Luis, died of leukemia which Cooke de Herrera believed was related to atomic radiation exposure he incurred while driving near Zion National Park after an atomic bomb test in 1953.

In 1957, de Herrera won a nationwide contest sponsored by a group of American (USA) magazines. Her prize was a world tour to promote American fashion. Afterwards, the United States Information Service (USIS) enabled her to visit governments around the world and advise them on fashion. For twelve years she was a leading figure in the fashion industry and was referred to as the "U.S. Ambassadress of Fashion" while traveling to 15 countries to present American couture. She also presented lectures entitled: "A Travelogue through Fashion" and "Around the World with Nancy Cooke".

De Herrera worked as a publicist for Maharishi Mahesh Yogi in the 1960s and traveled with him on a trip to South America. She was the liaison for the Maharishi and The Beatles during their widely publicized visit to Rishikesh in India., during which she and her son, Richard Cooke, served as the subject of the Beatles' satirical song "The Continuing Story of Bungalow Bill", written by John Lennon. During her dozens of trips to India and Tibet she is reported to have had meetings with the Dalai Lama, the sixteenth Gyalwa Karmapa, Sir Edmund Hillary, the Shah of Iran, King Hussein of Jordan, and Satya Sai Baba. In 1993, she published the autobiographical memoir, Beyond Gurus: A Woman Of Many Worlds, and in 2003, published a follow-up book called, All You Need Is Love: An Eyewitness Account of When Spirituality Spread from the East to the West.

Over the years she is reported to have given meditation lessons to several celebrities, including Madonna, Greta Garbo, Rosie O'Donnell, Lenny Kravitz, Santigold, and Sheryl Crow. She has been called one of the pioneers of the spiritual movement in the West. In 2008, she published the novel, Never Tango with a Stranger: Love in Peron's Argentina. According to de Herrera, with the help of some friends, she built two hospitals for abused children in Los Angeles.

She was reportedly working on a third autobiography, concerning her role as the U.S. Ambassadress of Fashion in the 1950s when she died on February 28, 2013, at the age of 90.

== Books ==
- Cooke de Herrera, Nancy (1993) Beyond Gurus: A Woman of Many Worlds, Blue Dolphin Pub
- Cooke de Herrera, Nancy (2003) All You Need Is Love: An Eyewitness Account of When Spirituality Spread from the East to the West, Jodere Group
- Cooke de Herrera, Nancy (2008) Never Tango with a Stranger: Love in Peron's Argentina, iUniverse
