= Mother Nature's Son =

- Cover of the song's sheet music

Song by the Beatles

from the album The Beatles
- Released: 22 November 1968
- Recorded: 9 & 20 August 1968
- Studio: EMI, London
- Genre: Folk
- Length: 2:48
- Label: Apple
- Songwriter: Lennon–McCartney
- Producer: George Martin

Audio sample
- "Mother Nature's Son": file; help

"Mother Nature's Son" is a song by the English rock band the Beatles from their 1968 double album The Beatles (also known as "the White Album"). The song was written primarily by Paul McCartney, and credited to Lennon–McCartney. It was inspired by a lecture given by the Maharishi Mahesh Yogi while the Beatles were in India. The same lecture inspired Lennon's song "Child of Nature", the tune that he later re-used for "Jealous Guy". Although credited to the group, the song was performed by McCartney alone (with a brass arrangement by George Martin), while the other Beatles were working on other songs.

According to Paul McCartney he was inspired by Nat King Cole's song "Nature Boy", which he heard growing up. He wrote the song in Liverpool when he visited his father.

== Recording ==
McCartney recorded the song during the height of the tensions that marred the sessions for The Beatles. On 9 August 1968, he recorded 25 takes singing and playing acoustic guitar simultaneously. Take 24 was perceived to be the best (take 2 later appeared on Anthology 3). McCartney recorded overdubs of timpani, another guitar, fingers slapping on a book and drums on 20 August, when George Martin's orchestral contributions were also added. The drums were put halfway down an uncarpeted corridor with the microphones at the far end, resulting in a bongo-like staccato sound. John Lennon did not play on the recording but McCartney said he contributed some words to the song in India. When Lennon (who hated McCartney's recording without the rest of the band) and Ringo Starr walked into the studio after McCartney had finished, "you could have cut the atmosphere with a knife", recalled engineer Ken Scott.

== Legacy ==
Coinciding with the 50th anniversary of its release, Jacob Stolworthy of The Independent listed "Mother Nature's Son" at number 15 in his ranking of the White Album's 30 tracks. He praised McCartney's vocals, writing "the anguish [in them] alone makes this one of the album's most emotional songs." John Denver covered it on his 1972 album Rocky Mountain High. Nilsson covered it on his 1969 album "Harry (album)".

== Personnel ==
Personnel per Ian MacDonald:

- Paul McCartney – double-tracked vocal, acoustic guitars, timpani, bass drum, book slaps
- Unknown – two trumpets, two trombones
