= Ajoy Bose =

Bengali-Indian author

Ajoy Bose (born 1952) is a Bengali-Indian author, political journalist and television commentator. His books include For Reasons of State: Delhi under Emergency (1977, written with John Dayal) on the Emergency; The Shah Commission Begins (1978, with Dayal); Behenji (2009), a biography of Indian politician and social reformer Mayawati; and Across the Universe: The Beatles in India (2018).

His writing has appeared in the publications Scroll.in, Quartz, Outlook, Economic and Political Weekly and Firstpost. In 2021, he made his directorial debut with the documentary film The Beatles and India. He has worked as a resident commentator for CNN-News18.

Bose grew up in Calcutta.
