= Janaki Setu =

Suspension bridge in Rishikesh, Uttarakhand

Coordinates: 30°06′59″N 78°18′32″E

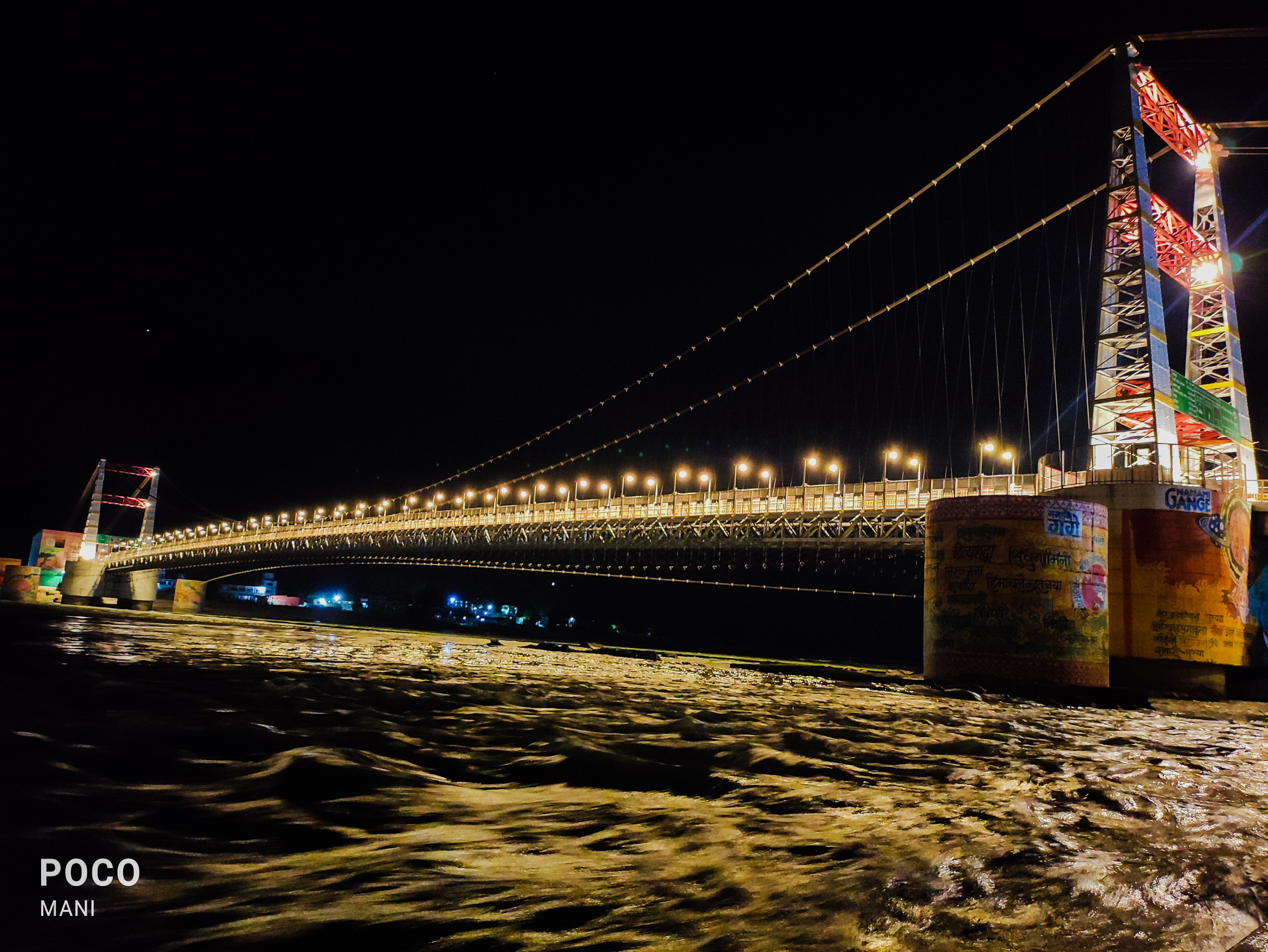
Janaki Setu

Janaki Setu, also known as Janaki Jhula, is a suspension bridge located in Muni Ki Reti, Uttarakhand, India, spanning the Ganges River. It is the third suspension bridge after Ram Jhula and Lakshman Jhula , spanning the Ganges River. It is the first three-lane bridge in Rishikesh side lane for two-wheelers and a center lane for pedestrians.

== Description ==
The bridge connects the Parmarth Niketan area with Kailash Ashram, and is an important route for pilgrims heading to the Neelkanth Mahadev Temple. Named after Sita (Janaki), the bridge is believed to be the spot where she crossed the river during her journey with Rama. The bridge provides views of the river and nearby hills, and is frequently visited by tourists. It is situated within the religious and natural surroundings of Rishikesh, near other notable sites, such as Ram Jhula.
