= Jhula =

Jhula झूला
- Village development committee
- Location in Nepal
- Coordinates: 28.67°N 82.43°E
- Country: Nepal
- Province: Karnali Province
- District: Western Rukum District

Population (2011)
  - Total: 3,334
- Time zone: UTC+5:45 (Nepal Time)
- Area code: +977-88
- Website: www.ddcrukum.gov.np

Jhula is a village development committee in Western Rukum District in Karnali Province of western Nepal. At the time of the 2011 Nepal census it had a population of 3334 people living in 686 individual households.

Jhula or, Jhula-pul, also translates into "bridge" or "suspension bridge" in Hindi language. (2)

2 examples would include the "Lakshman Jhula" bridge and the "Ram Jhula" bridge - both in Rishikesh, India
