= Muni Ki Reti =

- Town
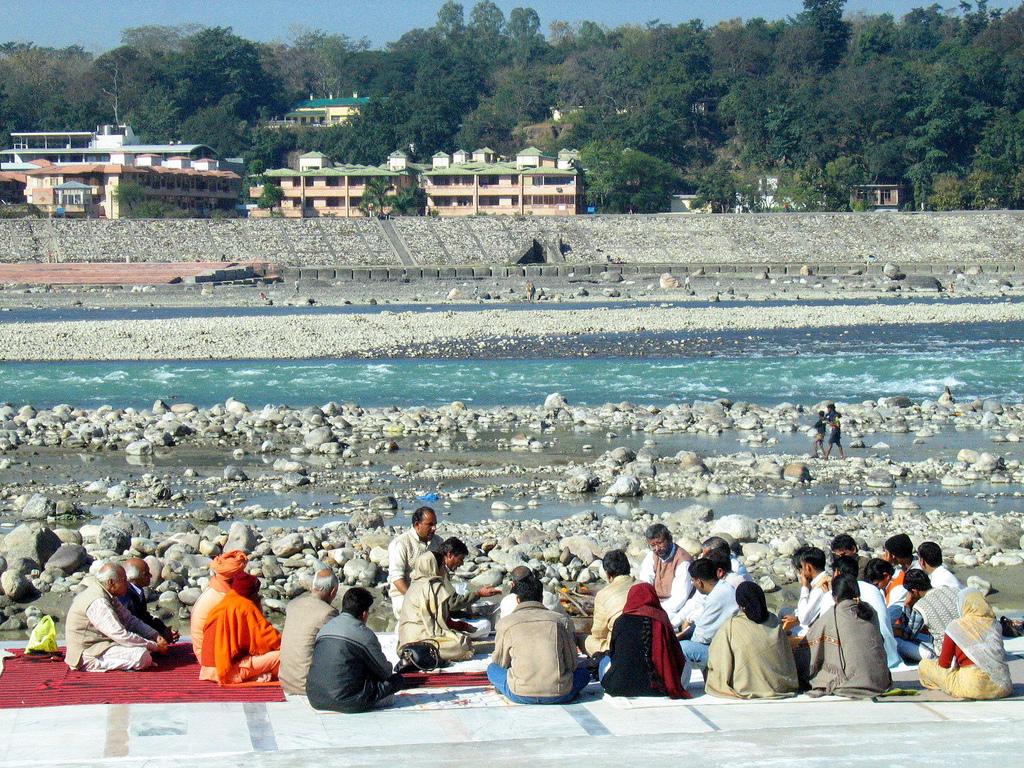
- A study group by the banks of the Ganges at Muni Ki Reti

- Location in Uttarakhand, India Muni Ki Reti (India)
- Coordinates: 30.07°N 78.16°E
- Country: India
- State: Uttarakhand
- District: Tehri Garhwal

Government
  - Type: Municipal Council
  - Body: Muni Ki Reti Municipal Council

Area
  - Total: 1.82 km^{2} (0.70 sq mi)
- Elevation: 456 m (1,496 ft)

Population (2011)
  - Total: 10,620
  - Density: 5,835/km^{2} (15,110/sq mi)

Languages
  - Official: Hindi
- Time zone: UTC+5:30 (IST)
- PIN: 249137
- Telephone code: 0135
- Sex ratio: 581 ♂ / ♀

Muni Ki Reti is a town and municipal council in Tehri Garhwal district, Uttarakhand, India. Located adjacent to the pilgrimage city of Rishikesh, it is known for its traditional ashrams, including the Divine Life Society founded by Sivananda Saraswati.

== History ==
Literally meaning "Sand of the sages" (muni), Muni Ki Reti is traditionally considered the gateway for the Char Dham pilgrimage — Badrinath, Kedarnath, Gangotri, and Yamunotri. It is also known as the place where King Bharata performed penance in the Ramayana.

In modern history, 'Kailash Ashram' was established here in 1880 by Dhanraj Giri. It was one of the first large ashrams to be established in Rishikesh. Before that it was mostly as a place for individual seekers or pilgrims to stop over on way to Char Dham temples pilgrimage.

Subsequently, Swami Atmananda founded Swargashram in 1908; Sivananda Ashram was established by Swami Sivananda in 1936. Gradually other ashrams came up and soon it became a popular destination for yoga and meditation practitioners and seekers of Vedantic knowledge. The town became a Nagar Panchayat on 30 November 1949 and was elevated to a Municipal Council in 2015. Over the years other ashrams have come up in the area — Gita Bhawan, Parmarth Niketan of Swami Chidanand Saraswati and Vanprastha Ashram — all on the opposite bank of the Ganges.

In February 1968 The Beatles visited the now-closed Maharishi Mahesh Yogi's ashram. John Lennon recorded 'The Happy Hrishikesh Song' here. The Beatles composed nearly 48 songs during their time at the Maharishi's ashram, many of which appear on the White Album. Several other artists, including Mike Love of The Beach Boys, Donovan and Gyp Mills, visited the site to contemplate and meditate.

For years boats were the only way to go across the Ganges where numerous ashrams lie, but in 1986, the building of a suspension bridge, Ram Jhula, similar to the Lakshman Jhula at Rishikesh, allowed easy access and rapid growth to the area.

== Demographics ==
According to the 2011 Census of India, Muni Ki Reti had a population of 10,620. Males constitute 63% of the population and females 37%. The town has an average literacy rate of 73%, higher than the national average of 59.5%: male literacy is 79%, and female literacy is 63%. In Muni Ki Reti 13% of the population is under 6 years of age.

== Gallery ==
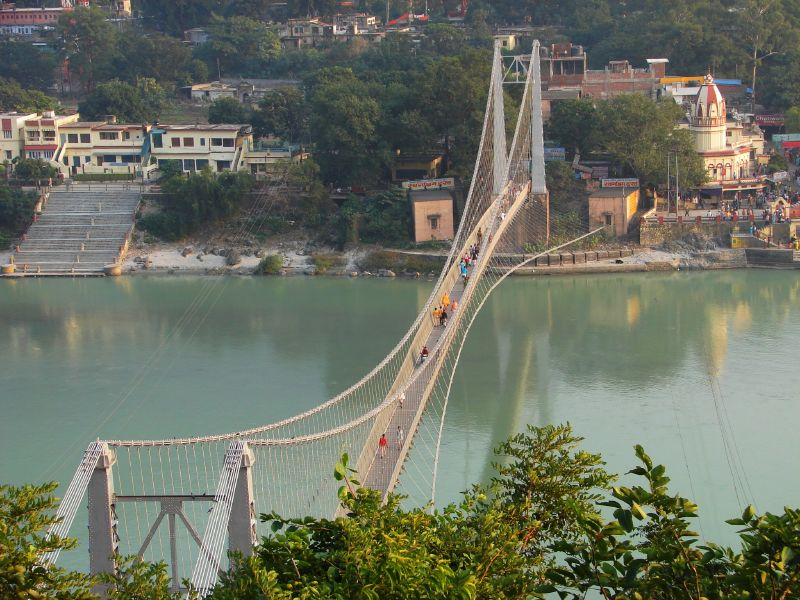
Ram Jhula, the bridge over the Ganges.

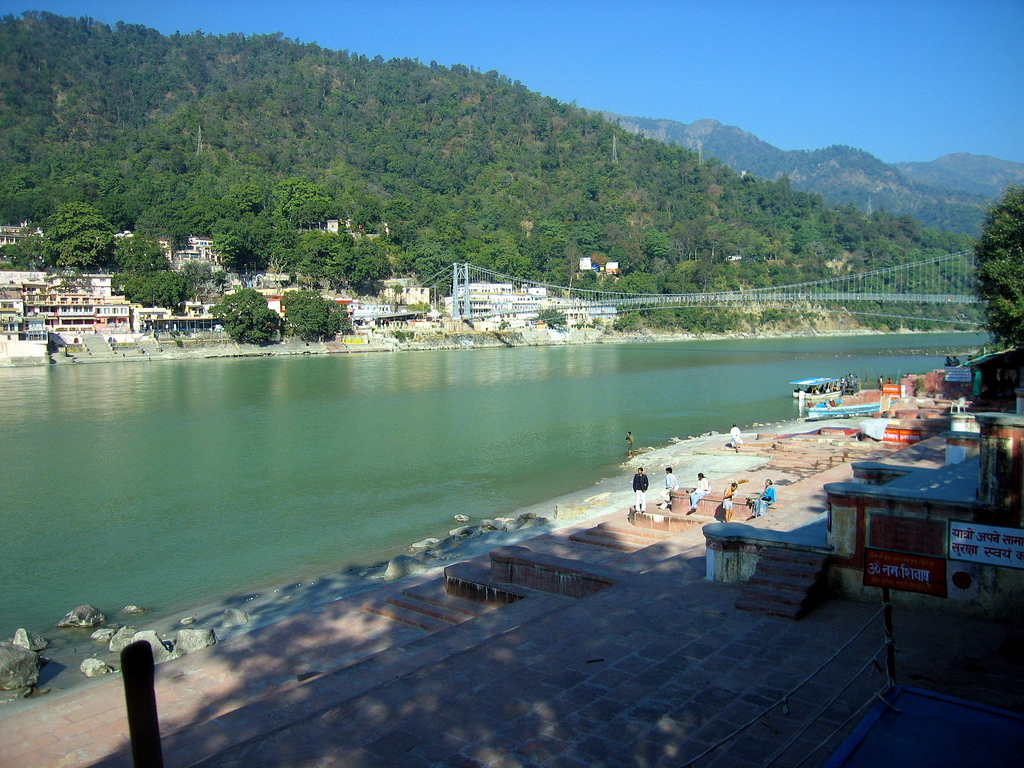
Ghats on the Ganges and Ram Jhula bridge at Muni ki Reti.

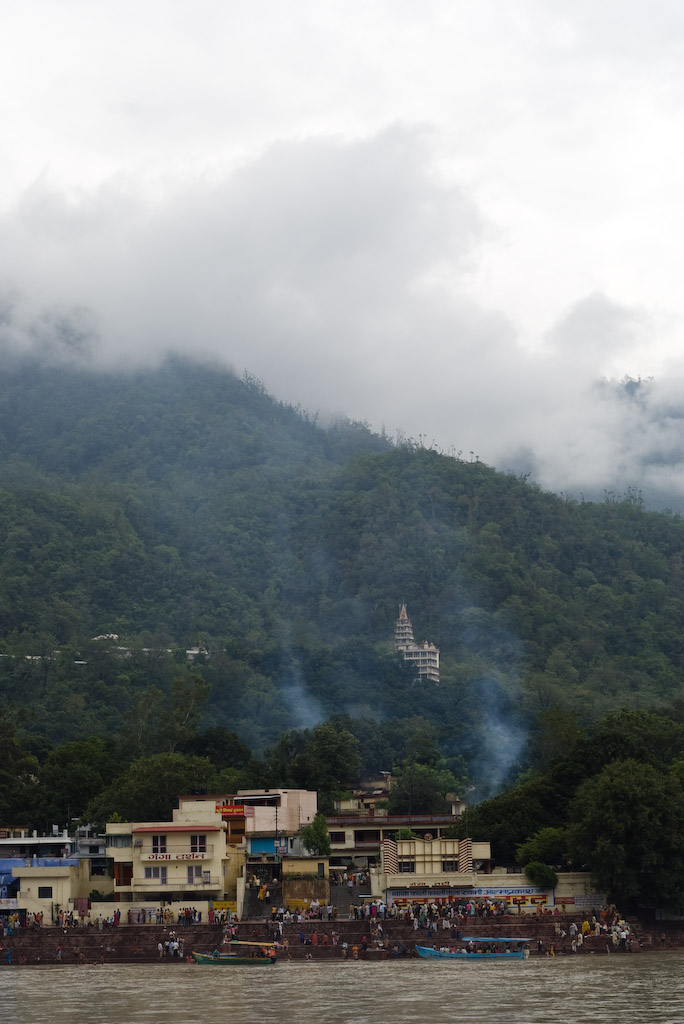
Ganga ghats across the river Ganges, at Muni ki Reti.

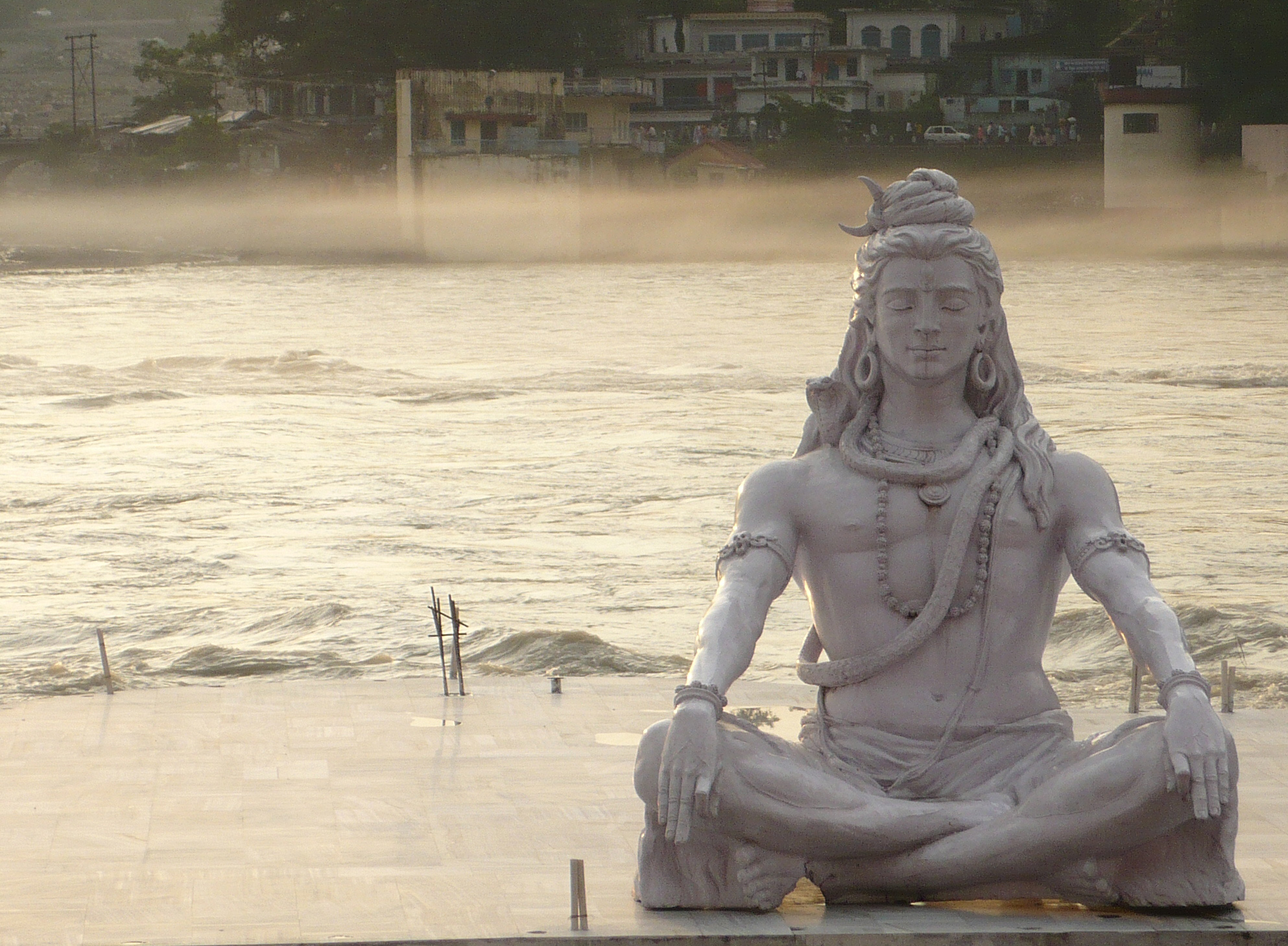
The Shiva statue overlooking the ghats, near Parmarth Niketan.

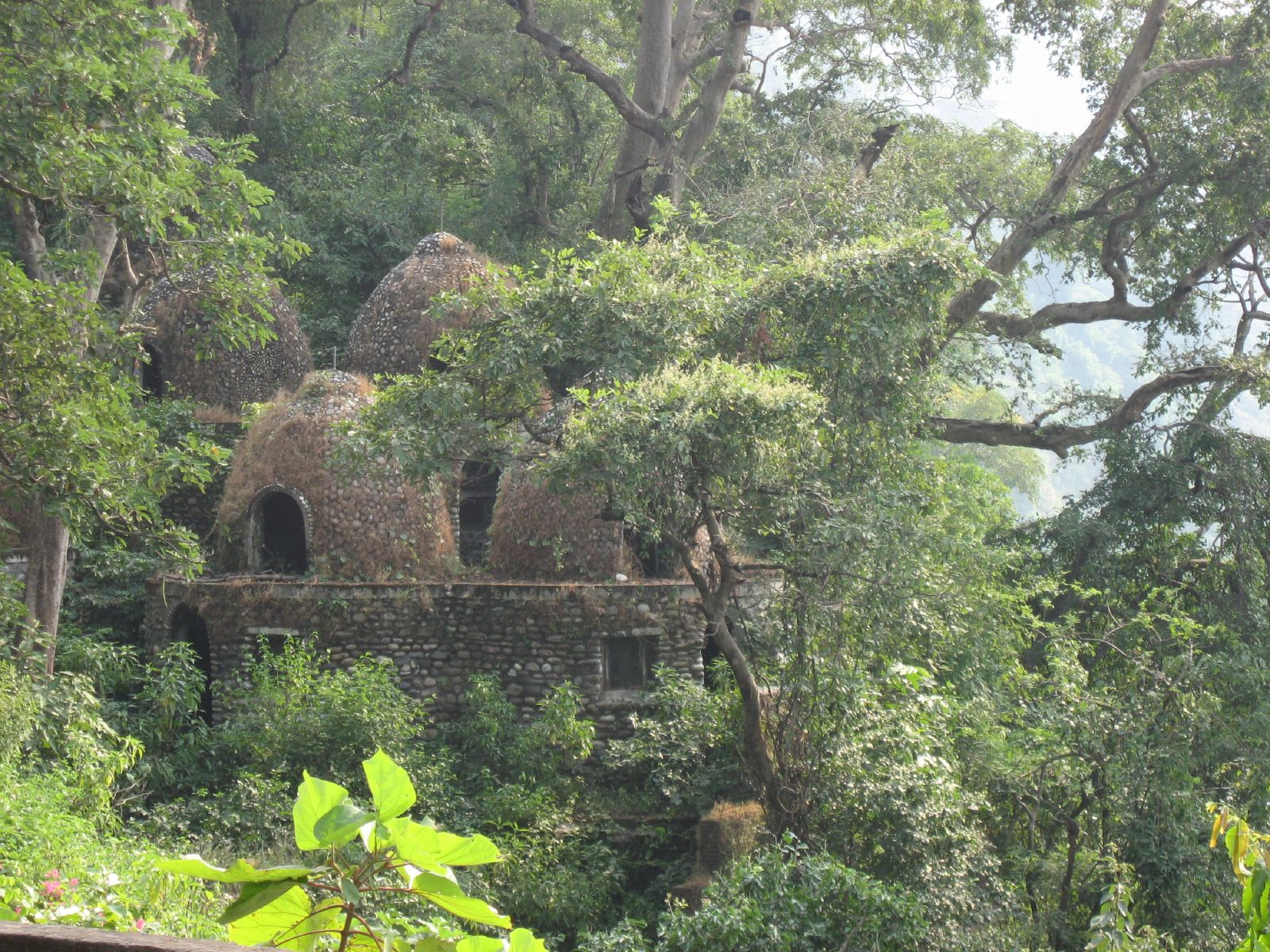
Meditation chambers at the old Maharishi Mahesh Yogi Ashram, now in ruins, Muni Ki Reti.

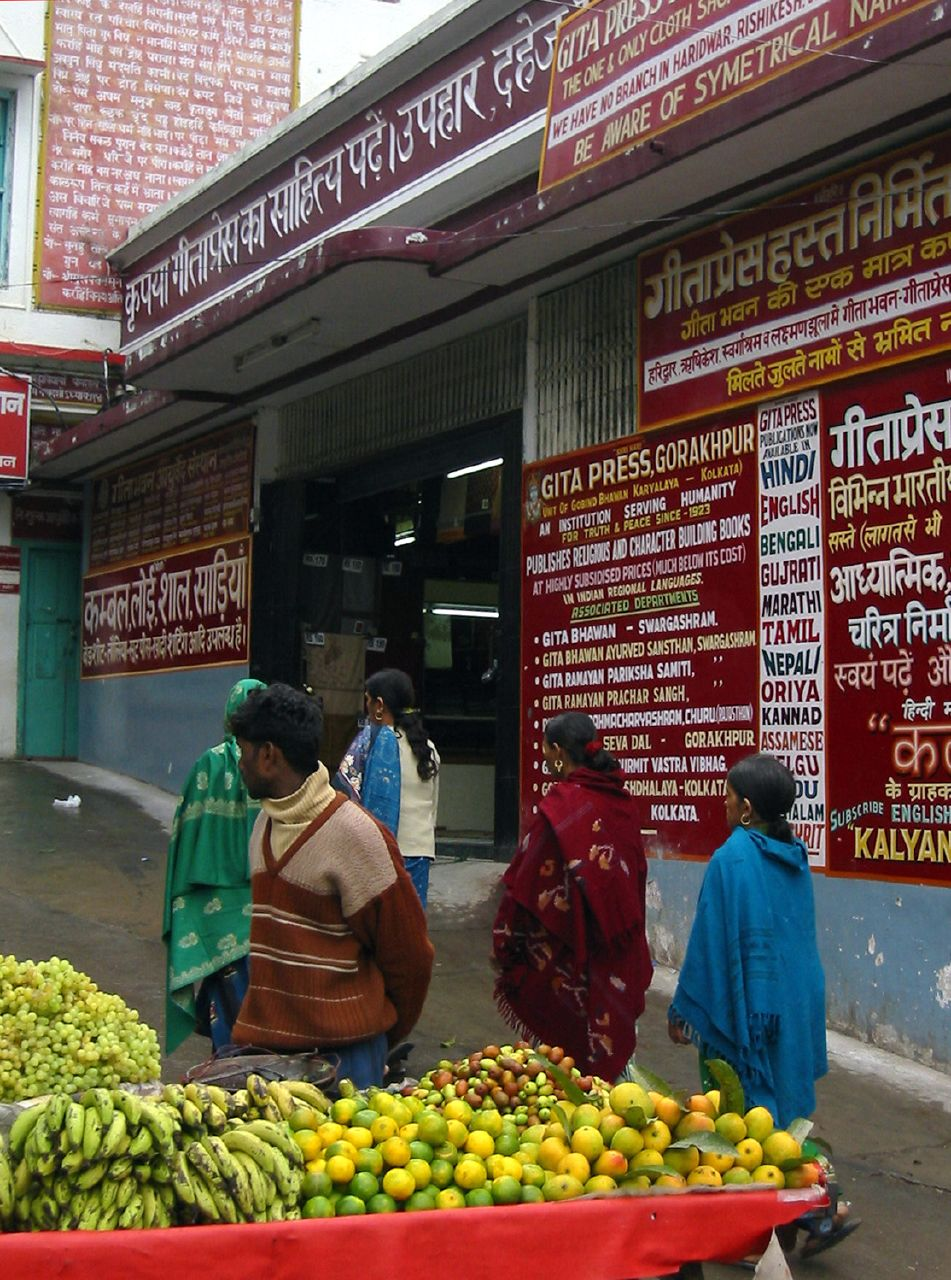
Gita Press outlet, Gita Bhavan, Muni Ki Reti.

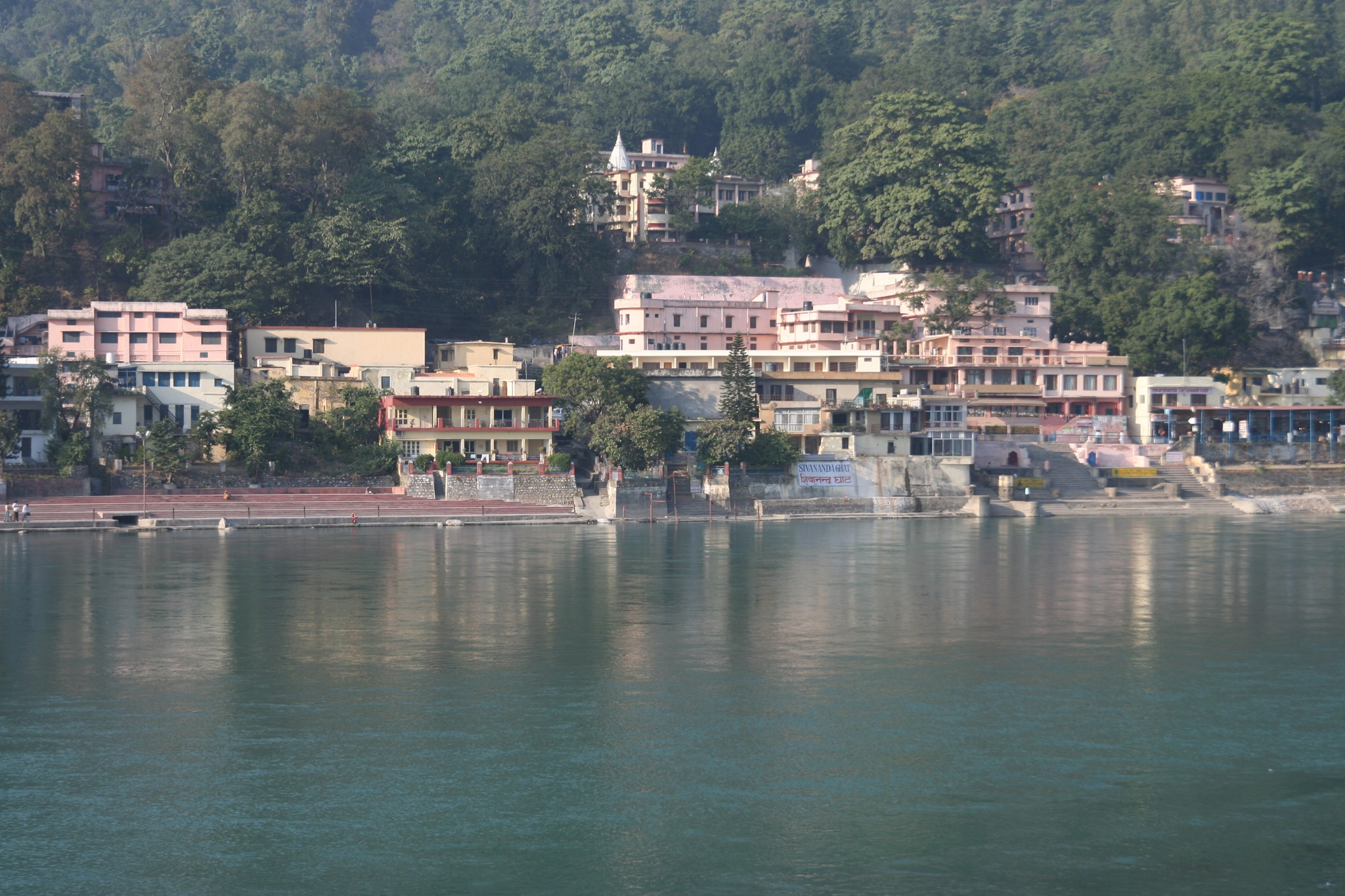
'Shivananda Kutir' on the Shivananda ghat, with Shivananda Ashram above.
