= Sanjay Jheel, Rishikesh =

Urban lake in Rishikesh, Uttarakhand, India

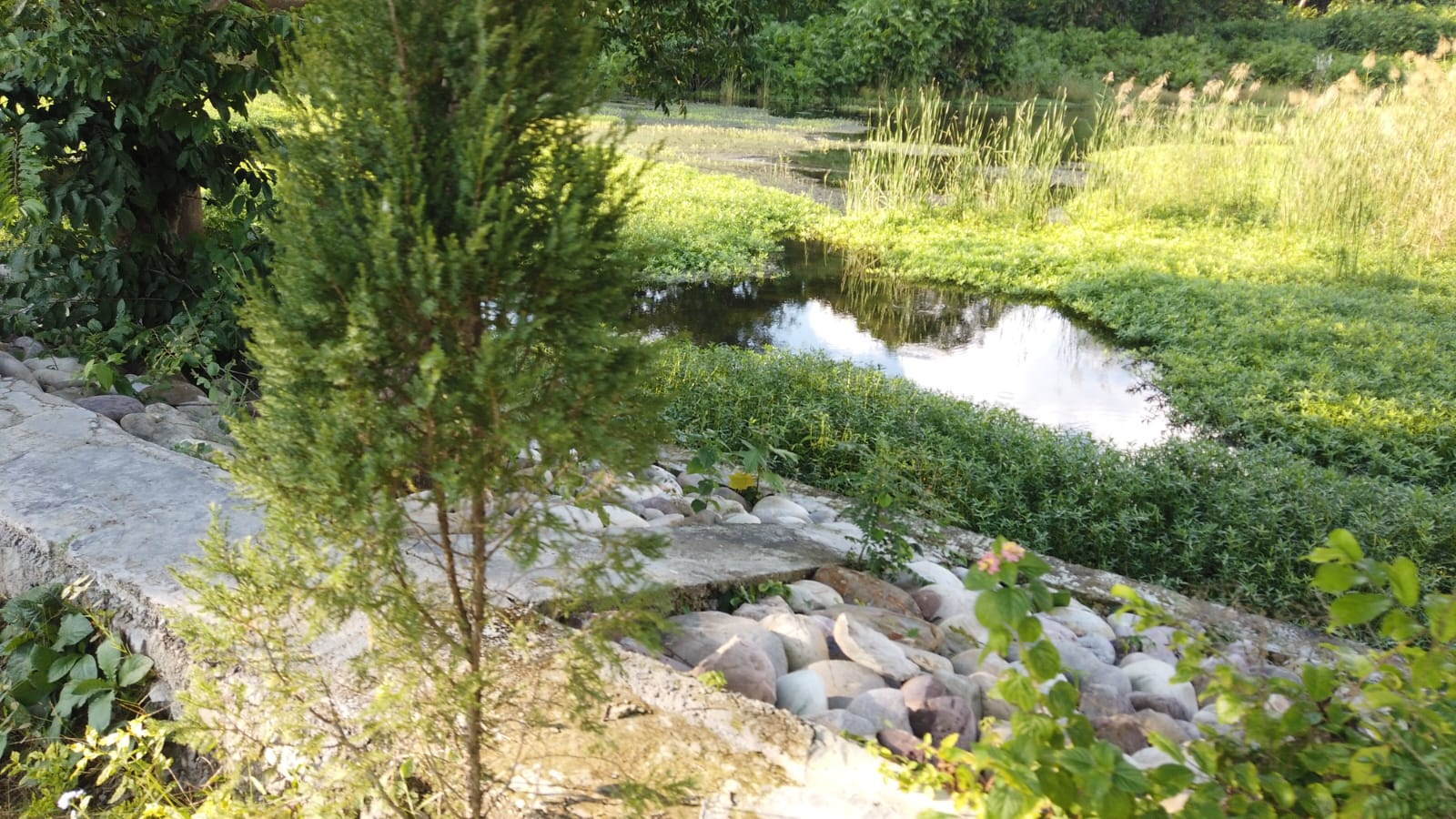

Sanjay Jheel is a freshwater lake and recreational park located in the Ganga Nagar locality of Rishikesh, Uttarakhand. Situated near the Haridwar-Rishikesh Highway, the lake serves as a green lung for the city and a site for local tourism and environmental conservation.

== Geography and Location ==
The lake is positioned in the southern part of Rishikesh, specifically in the Ganga Nagar and Adarsh Gram areas. It sits on land managed by the Uttarakhand Forest Department. Unlike the man-made Sanjay Lake in Delhi, the Rishikesh lake is considered a natural water depression that collects runoff from the surrounding Shivalik foothills. It serves as a critical groundwater recharge zone for the local urban area. The lake is positioned in the southern part of Rishikesh, managed largely by the Forest Department in collaboration with the local Municipal Corporation (Nagar Nigam). It is located near the origin of the Rambha River (a seasonal tributary).

== Mythological and Historical Significance ==
According to local lore and references in the Kedar Khand of the Skanda Purana, the area is associated with the origin of the Rambha River. Legend states that the river is connected to the penance of mythological figures, lending the water a "holy" status among local residents. Historically, the lake was a dense forest pocket that provided a buffer between the town and the wildlife of the Shivalik range.

== Development and Beautification ==
In recent years, the Uttarakhand state government has initiated several phases of beautification to transform the lake into a major tourist destination:

- Infrastructure: Efforts include the construction of walking tracks, jogging paths, and a dedicated entrance gate near the Rambha River origin.
- Forest Land: Since the lake sits on forest department land, development focus has been on maintaining the ecological balance while adding visitor amenities.
- Recent Projects: As of 2024–2025, the local Nagar Nigam has proposed further grand-scale tourism projects to revitalize the area, which has historically faced issues with maintenance and overgrowth.

== Flora and Fauna ==
The lake area is surrounded by dense vegetation characteristic of the Himalayan foothills. It attracts various local bird species, making it a spot for birdwatching and nature photography.

== Governance ==
The lake is primarily under the jurisdiction of the Rishikesh Forest Division

=== See also ===
- Rajaji National Park
- Neer Garh Waterfall
- List of lakes in India
