= Triveni Ghat =

Ghat in Uttarakhand, India

- Triveni Ghat
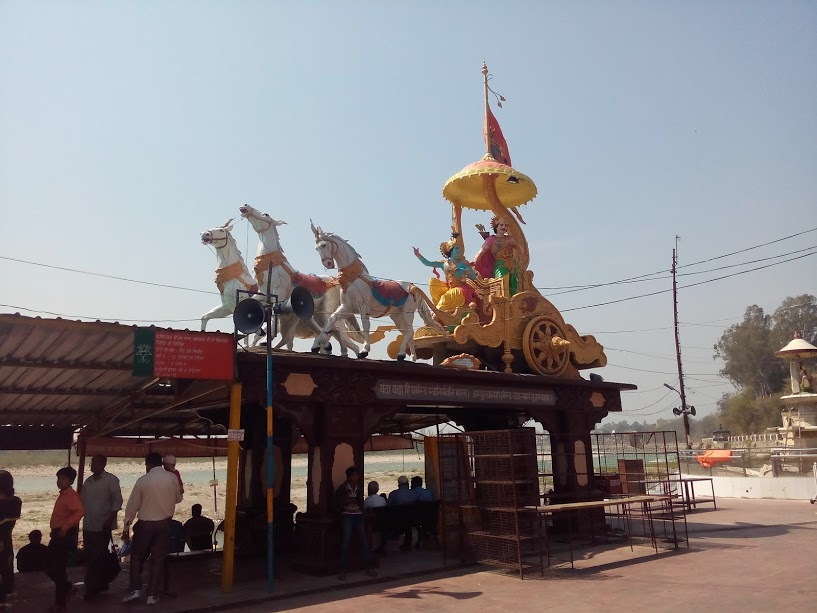
- Statue of Krishna and Arjuna upon a chariot, Triveni Ghat

- Location in Uttarakhand

Religion
- Affiliation: Hinduism
- District: Dehradun

Location
- Location: Rishikesh, Uttarakhand
- State: Uttarakhand
- Country: India
- Coordinates: 29°59′4.834″N 78°54′55.733″E

Website
- rishikesh.app/triveni-ghat

Triveni Ghat is the largest and most famous ghat in Rishikesh, Uttarakhand, situated on the banks of the Ganges.

Devotees visit the ghat to take ritual baths, believing it cleanses them of their sins. It is also used for the performance of the last rites ritual. The ghat is famed for the Ganga arti, performed to the chants of Vedic hymns. The Gita Temple, Triveni Mata Temple, and the Lakshmi-Narayan Temple are located at its banks.

== Gallery ==
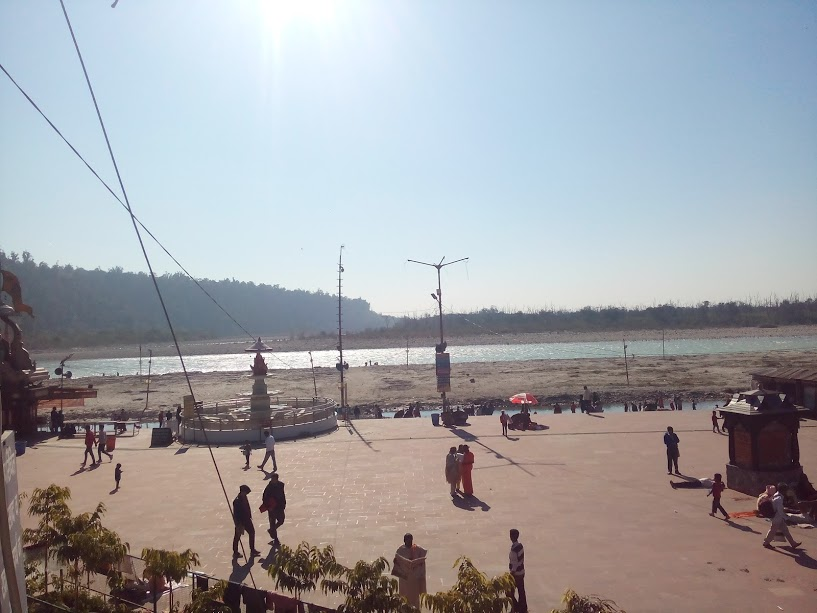

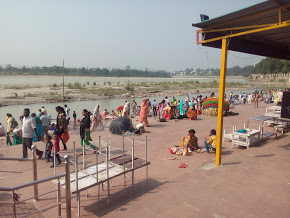

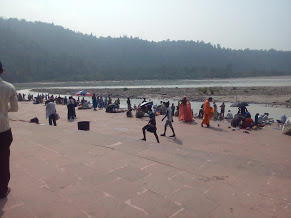

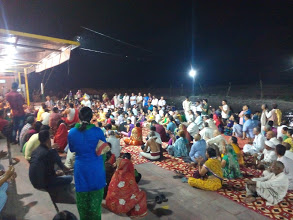
