= Rishikesh =

City in Uttarakhand, India

- Municipal corporation and tehsil
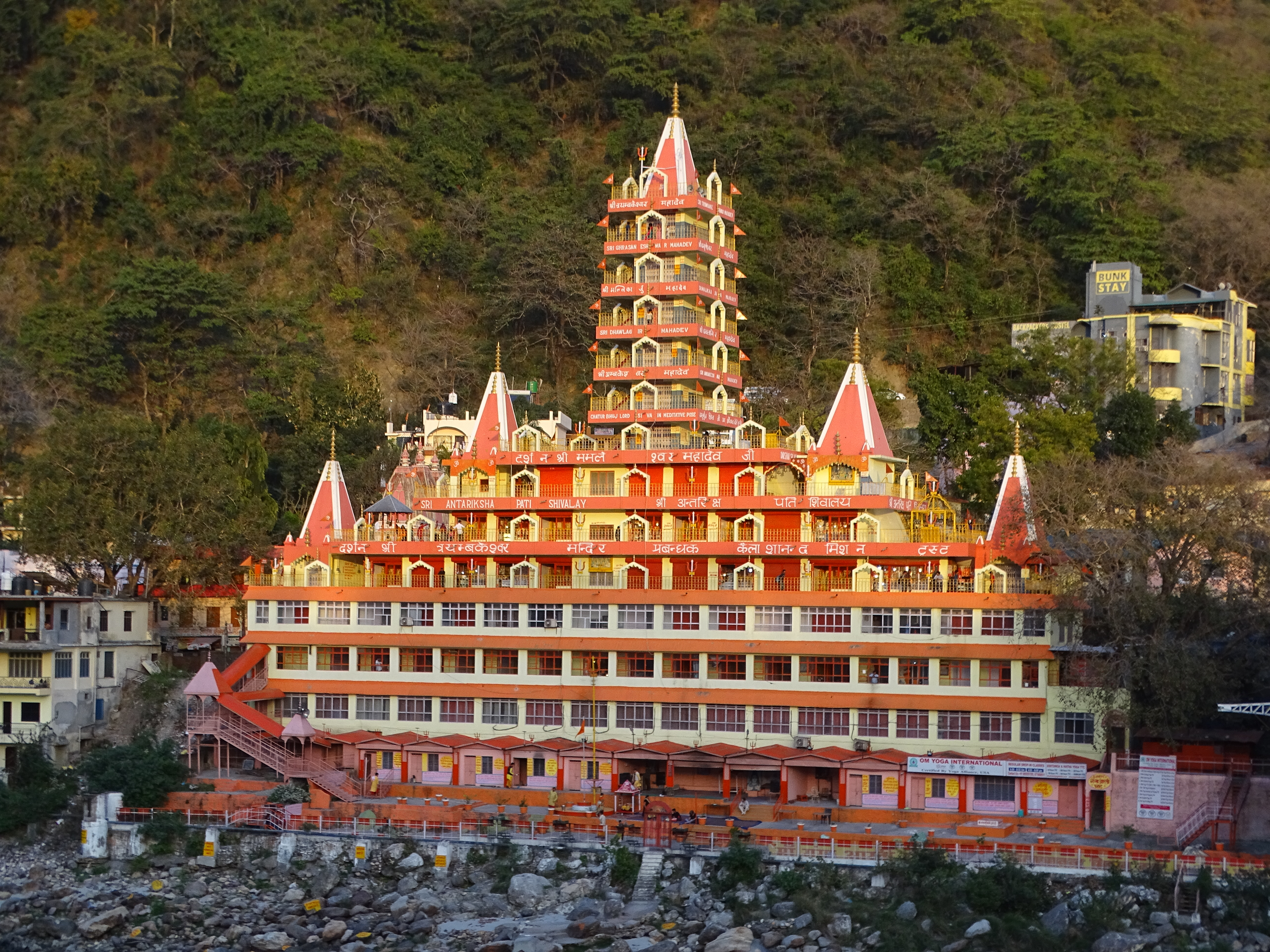
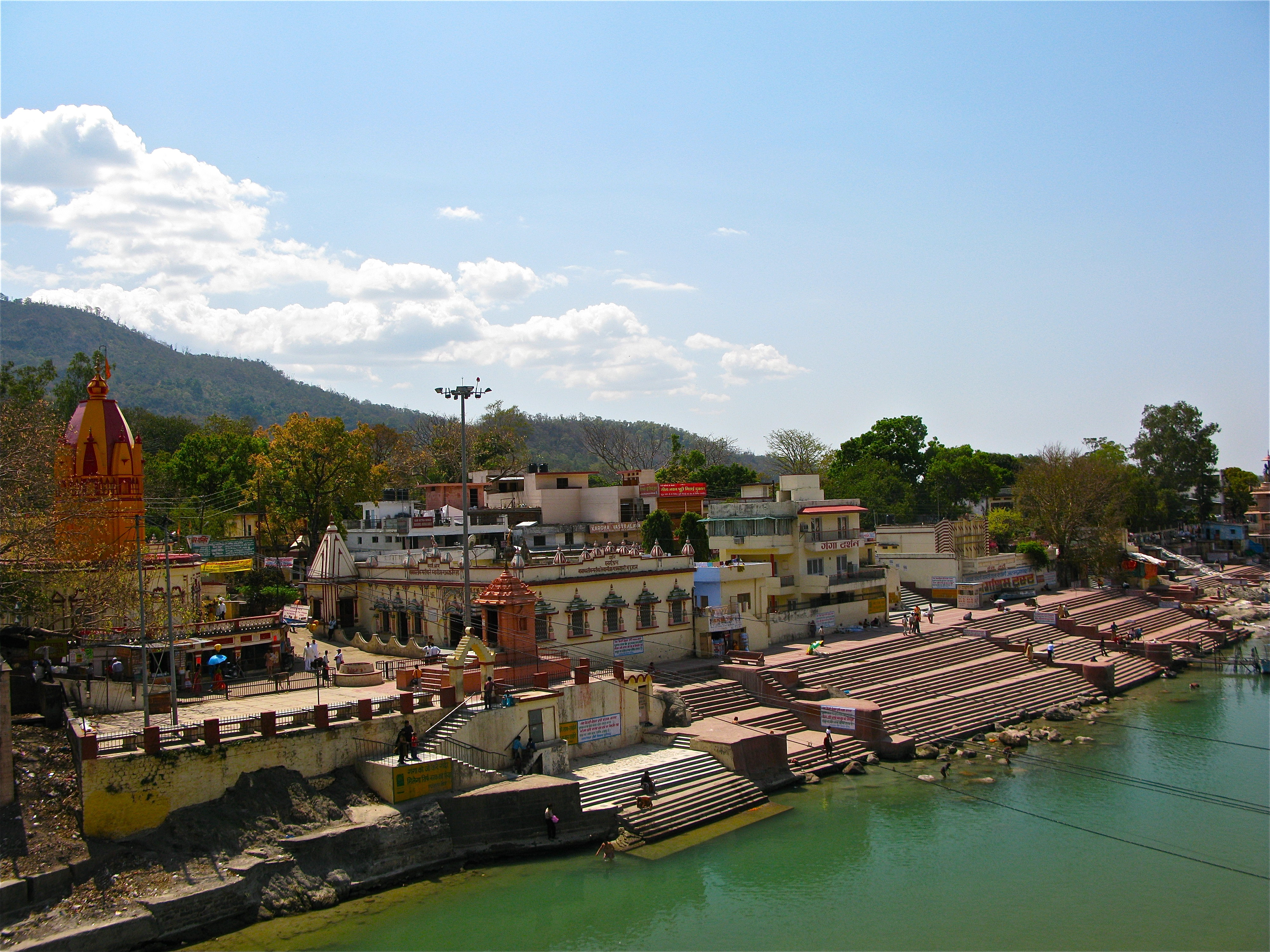
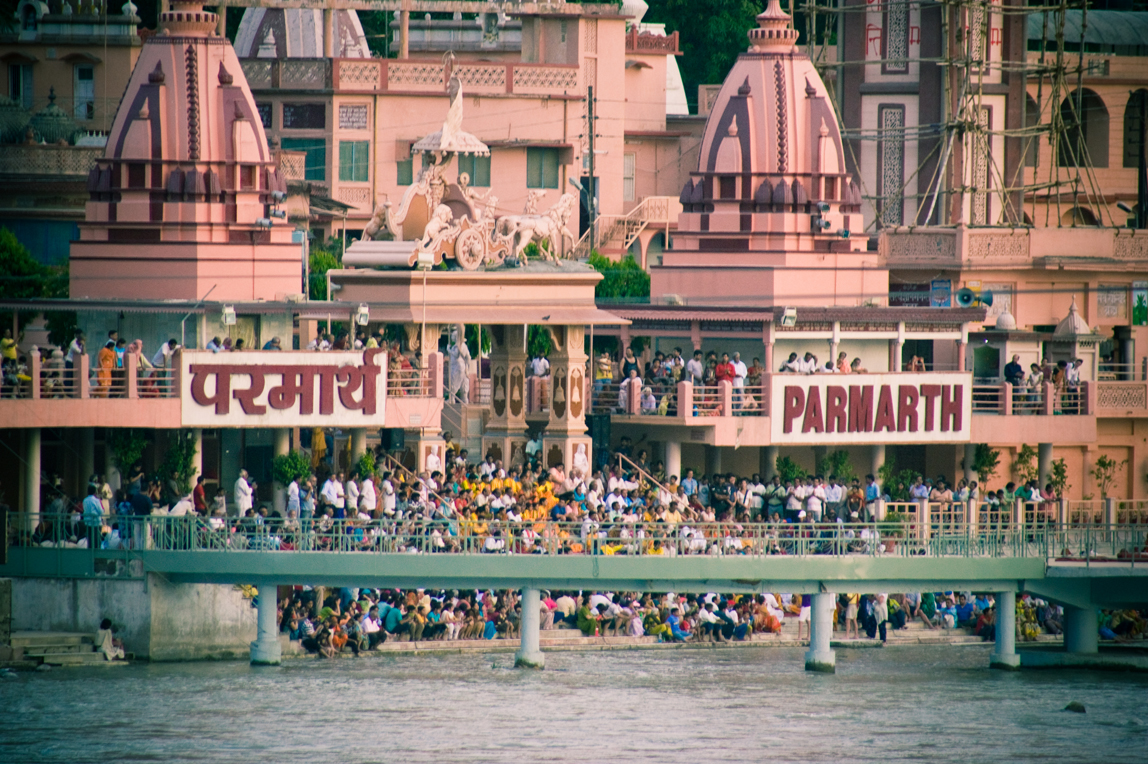
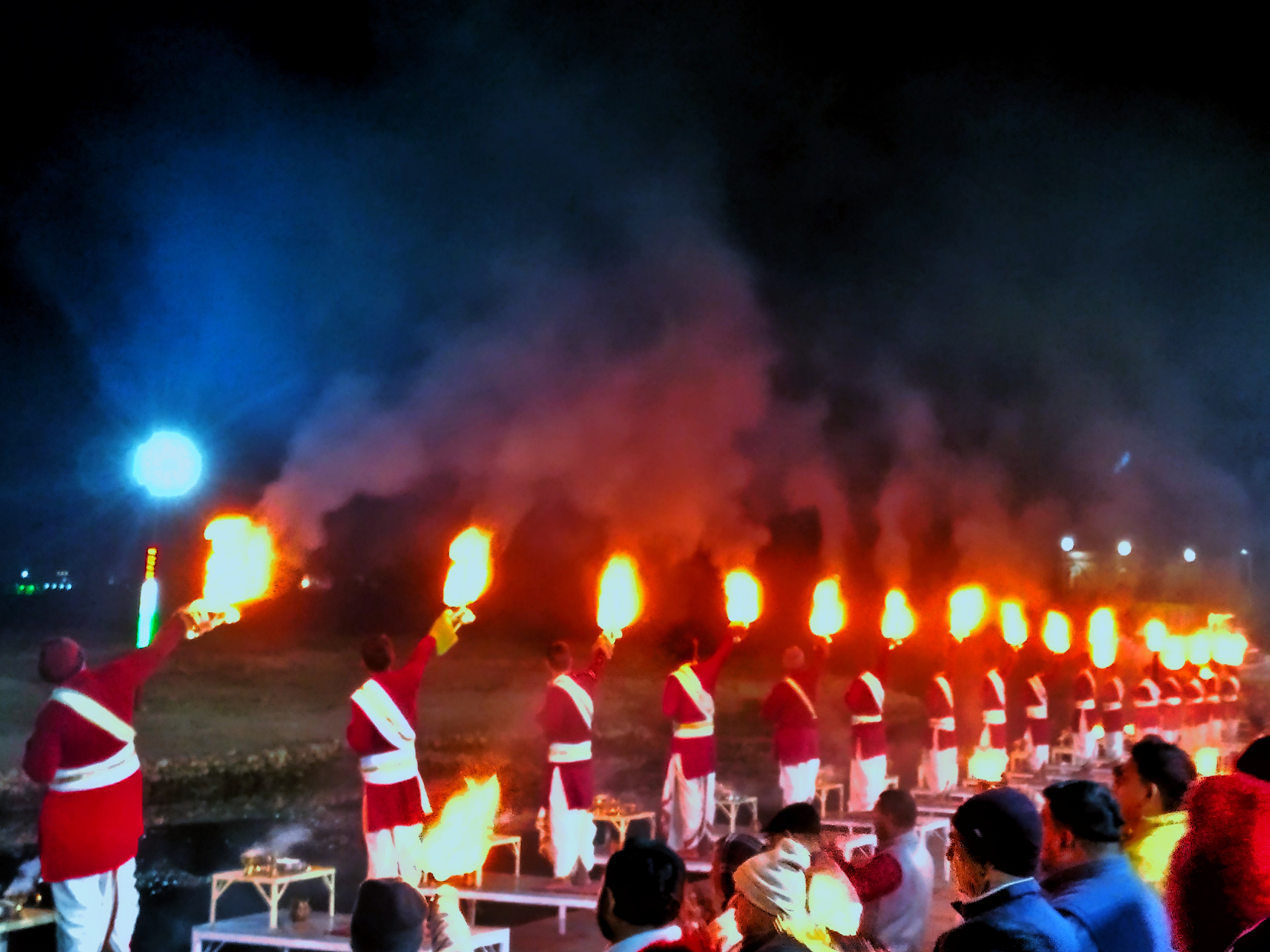
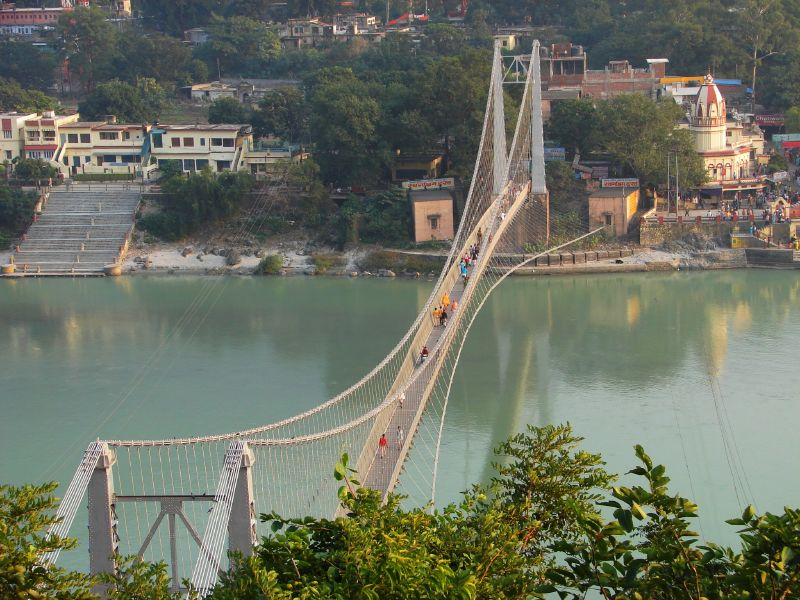
- From top: Triambakeshwar Temple, Muni Ki Reti, Parmarth Niketan, Janki Setu, Evening aarti at Triveni Ghat, the Ram Jhula
- Nicknames: Yoganagari and Yognagari
- Location in Uttarakhand Rishikesh (India)
- Coordinates: 30°06′30″N 78°17′50″E
- Country: India
- State: Uttarakhand
- District: Dehradun
- Tehsil: Rishikesh
- Named for: Hrishikesha

Government
  - Type: Municipal Corporation
  - Body: Rishikesh Municipal Corporation (earlier Municipality, 1952)
  - Mayor: Shambhu Paswan (BJP)
  - Lok Sabha MP: Trivendra Singh Rawat (BJP)
  - MLA: Premchand Aggarwal (BJP)
  - Municipal Commissioner: Shailendra Singh Negi

Area
  - Total: 11.5 km^{2} (4.4 sq mi)
- Elevation: 340 m (1,120 ft)

Population (2011)
  - Total: 102,138 (urban agglomeration); 70,499 (City as per Census 2,011)
  - Rank: 7th
  - Density: 8,851/km^{2} (22,920/sq mi)
  - Male: 54,446
  - Female: 47,672

Languages
  - Official: Hindi
  - Native: Khariboli; Garhwali
- Time zone: UTC+5:30 (IST)
- PIN: 249201
- Telephone code: +91-135
- Vehicle registration: UK-14
- Literacy (2011): 86.86%
  - Male: 92.21%
  - Female: 80.78%
  - Rank: 2nd
- Sex ratio (2011): 875 ♀ / 1000 ♂

Rishikesh or Hrishikesh is a municipal corporation and tehsil of the Dehradun district of the Indian state Uttarakhand. It is situated on the right bank of the Ganges river and is a pilgrimage town for Hindus associated with famous sages and yogis. There are numerous temples and ashrams built along the banks of the river. Nicknamed the "Gateway to the Garhwal Himalayas", Rishikesh is a vegetarian-only and alcohol-free city. The city has hosted the International Yoga Festival annually on the first week of March since 1999, giving it the nickname of Yoga Capital of the World.

Rishikesh is the starting point for travelling to the four Char Dham pilgrimage places: Badrinath, Kedarnath, Gangotri, and Yamunotri. It is also a starting point for Himalayan tourist destinations such as Harsil, Chopta, Auli, as well as summer and winter trekking destinations like Dodital, Dayara Bugyal, Kedarkantha and Har Ki Dun.

In September 2015, Indian Minister of Tourism Mahesh Sharma announced that Rishikesh and Haridwar would be the first "twin national heritage cities". As of 2021, Rishikesh has a total population of 322,825 including the city and its 93 surrounding villages.

The city is governed by Rishikesh Municipal Corporation and tehsil.

== Etymology ==
IAST: "Hṛṣīkeśa" (Sanskrit: हृषीकेश) is a name derived from Vishnu, composed of hṛṣīka meaning 'senses' and īśa meaning 'lord' for a combined meaning as 'Lord of the Senses'. The name commemorates an apparition of Vishnu to Raibhya Rishi, as a result of his tapasya (austerities), as Hrishikesha. In the Skanda Purana, this area is known as Kubjāmraka (कुब्जाम्रक), as Vishnu appeared under a mango tree.

== History ==
Rishikesh was part of the legendary "Kedarkhand" mentioned in the Skanda Purana. Legends state that Rama did penance here for killing Ravana, the asura king of Lanka. Lakshmana, Rama's younger brother, crossed the Ganges using two jute ropes at the point where the present Lakshman Jhula (लक्ष्मण झूला) suspension bridge stands today. The 248-foot long iron-rope suspension bridge built in 1889 was washed away by flooding in 1924. In 1927, it was replaced by another, stronger bridge built by the United Provinces Public Works Department, connecting the Tapovan, Tehri, and Jonk, Pauri Garhwal districts. Lakshman Jhula collapsed again in 2020. And a much stronger, second in the whole of India, a glass bridge, is being built across the river.

A noted suspension bridge named Ram Jhula was built in 1986 at the nearby Sivananda Nagar.

The Skanda Purana also mentions the site as "Indrakund" where Indra underwent a holy bath to remove a curse.

The Ganges, one of the most sacred rivers to Hindus, flows through Rishikesh in its course from the Shivalik Hills of the Himalayas to the plains of northern India with temples built along the banks Shatrughna Mandir, Bharat Mandir, and Lakshman Mandir are the ancient temples established by Adi Shankaracharya. Shatrughna Temple is near the Ram Jhula suspension bridge, while Lakshman Mandir is situated near the Lakshman Jhula suspension bridge.

The historical records mention that some pilgrims used to stay at Rishikesh, either seeking the site itself or using it as a resting place before moving onwards to the Himalayas.

The Gazetteer of Dehradun, written by Indian Civil Service officer HG Walton, describes the site as "beautifully situated on the right bank of the Ganges, on a high cliff overlooking the river. The place is developing very rapidly, especially since the construction of the new bridge over the Song River, the realignment of the pilgrim road from Raiwala to Rishikesh."

== Geography ==
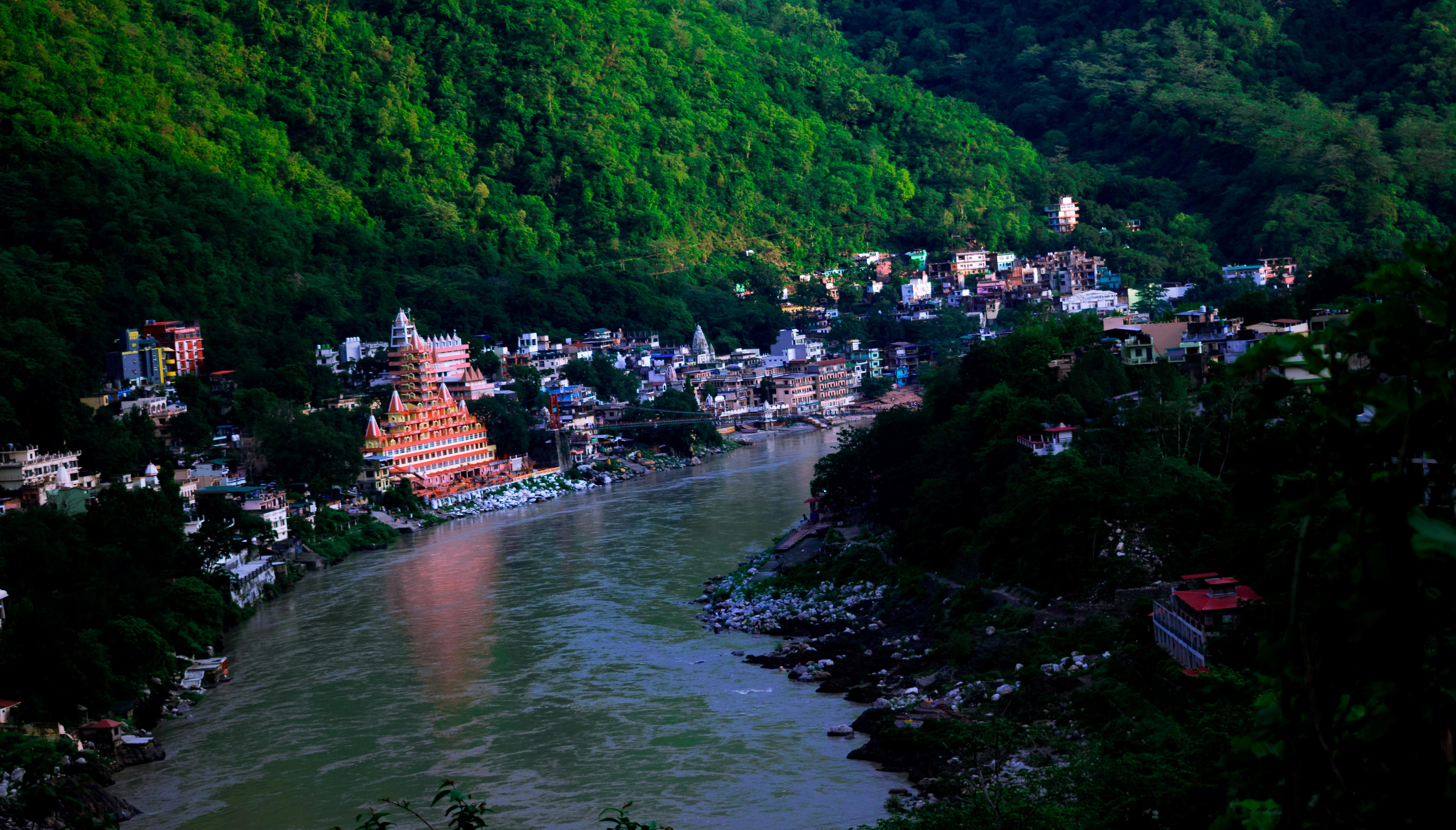
A view of temples on the banks of river Ganges near Laxman Jhula

Rishikesh is at 30.103368°N 78.294754°E. It has an average elevation of 340 metres (1,120 ft). The town is located in the Tehri Garhwal region of the northern Indian state of Uttarakhand.

After flowing 249 km (155.343 mi) through narrow Himalayan valleys, the Ganges emerges at Rishikesh before debouching onto the Gangetic Plain at the pilgrimage town of Haridwar. Despite the pollution of the Ganges, the water in Rishikesh is relatively unaffected, as the major polluting points are down river in the neighbouring state of Uttar Pradesh.

According to the Köppen-Geiger climate classification system, its climate is humid subtropical (Cwa). The average maximum temperature is 40 °C (104 °F). The average minimum temperature is 7 °C. The wettest month is July with the highest rainfall of 444 mm. The driest month is November with rainfall of 10 mm. Months of May, June, July, and August have the highest UV index of 12, and January and December have the lowest UV index of 4.

Climate data for Rishikesh
Month	Jan	Feb	Mar	Apr	May	Jun	Jul	Aug	Sep	Oct	Nov	Dec	Year
Mean daily maximum °C (°F)	17 (63)	22 (72)	29 (84)	35 (95)	39 (102)	38 (100)	33 (91)	32 (90)	32 (90)	30 (86)	25 (77)	20 (68)	29 (85)
Mean daily minimum °C (°F)	5 (41)	8 (46)	14 (57)	18 (64)	23 (73)	25 (77)	25 (77)	24 (75)	23 (73)	15 (59)	9 (48)	6 (43)	16 (61)
Average precipitation mm (inches)	51 (2.0)	33 (1.3)	34 (1.3)	9 (0.4)	20 (0.8)	94 (3.7)	482 (19.0)	495 (19.5)	219 (8.6)	76 (3.0)	9 (0.4)	17 (0.7)	1,539 (60.7)
Average rainy days	3	2	3	1	2	7	15	16	8	2	0	1	60
Mean daily sunshine hours	6	7	8	9	9	7	6	6	7	8	8	7	7
Source: Weather2Travel

Rishikesh has been ranked as the city with a population under 300,000 with the 31st cleanest air in India under the National Clean Air Programme.

== Civic administration ==
The Rishikesh Municipal Corporation has administered the city's 40 wards since the 2018 incorporation of the urban local body. Each ward had between 2,300 and 3,000 residents during the 2018 assessment. Rishikesh belongs to the Haridwar Lok Sabha constituency. The first an mayor of the corporation is Anita Mamgain and the current mayor is Sambhu Paswan. The current Municipal Commissioner, commonly known as Nagar Aayukt locally, is Narendra Singh.

== Demographics ==
As per provisional data of 2011 census, Rishikesh had a population of 102,138, out of which males were 54,466 (53%) and females were 47,672 (47%). The literacy rate was 86.86% compared to the national average of 74.04%.

Rishikesh Tehsil (Rural+Urban) Mother-tongue of population, according to the 2011 Indian Census.
Rank	Mother Tongue	Speakers	Percentage of total population
1	Hindi	134,203	51.56%
2	Garhwali	90,008	34.58%
3	Punjabi	10,021	3.85%
4	Bhojpuri	7,296	2.80%
5	Nepali	6,819	2.62%
6	Bengali	3,554	1.37%
7	Urdu	2,028	0.78%
8	Kumaoni	1,722	0.66%
Others		4,582	1.76%
Total		260,233	100%

Mother tongue in Rishikesh Tehsil (2011)
1. Hindi (51.6%)
2. Garhwali (34.6%)
3. Punjabi (3.85%)
4. Bhojpuri (2.80%)
5. Nepali (2.62%)
6. Bengali (1.37%)
7. Urdu (0.78%)
8. Kumauni (0.66%)
9. Other (1.78%)

== Culture ==
=== Cuisine ===
The cuisine of Rishikesh is all-vegetarian. Since 1956, the sale of meat, fish, and eggs has been banned in Rishikesh. In 2004, the Supreme Court upheld the ban on eggs. Traditional food in Rishkesh is Garhwali cuisine with common dishes including daal, gahat, and phaanu. Lentils, legumes, millet, barley, buckwheat, and vegetables are the primary ingredients. Only select spices are used. Mustard oil is the common cooking oil. Restaurant thali and street vendors selling samosas and chaat are common.

== Environment and ecology ==
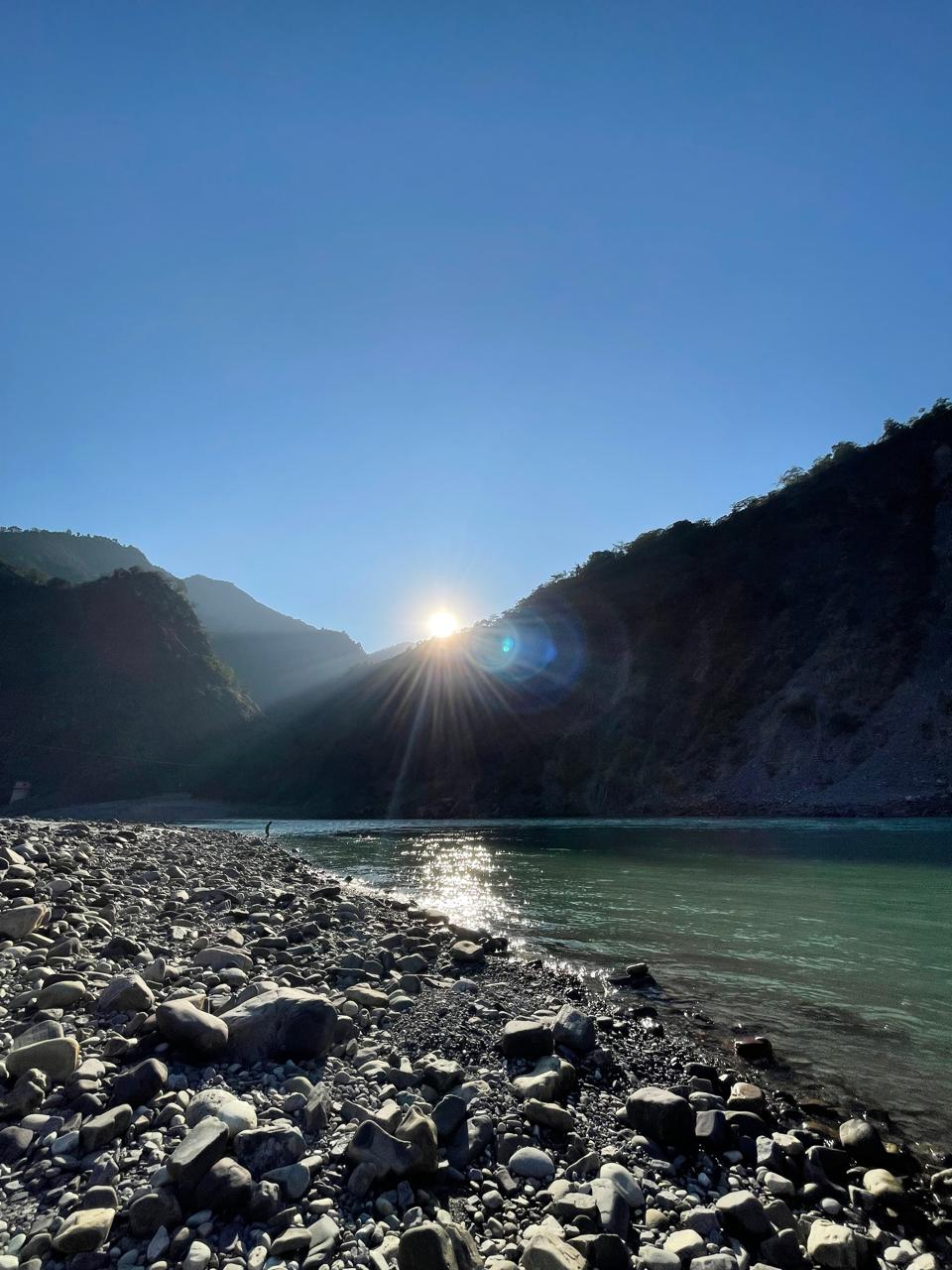
A view of river Ganga near village Singtali, Byasi, Uttarakhand

=== Biodiversity and protected areas ===
Rishikesh is situated at the foot of the Shivalik Range and serves as a significant ecological buffer zone. Large parts of the city's periphery border Rajaji National Park, a designated tiger reserve and a major habitat for the Asian elephant. The surrounding mixed deciduous forests are rich in medicinal plants and provide a habitat for diverse avian species, making the region a prominent center for eco-tourism and birdwatching. Sanjay Jheel, a freshwater lake in the Ganga Nagar area, is a natural freshwater lake and the primary hydrological source of the Rambha River (also known as the Kala Pani). Situated within the Barkot Forest Range of the Eastern Doon Forest Division. The jheel creates a critical groundwater recharge zone and a riparian habitat for diverse avian species.

=== Ecological Projects ===
Rishikesh has seen many sanitation infrastructure projects under the Namami Gange Mission. To mitigate the direct discharge of municipal sewage into the Ganges, the city operates several facilities, including a 26 MLD (Million Litres per Day) Sewage Treatment Plant (STP) at Lakkad Ghat and a 7.5 MLD plant at Muni ki Reti. These facilities utilize Sequential Batch Reactor (SBR) and Moving Bed Biofilm Reactor (MBBR) technologies to achieve higher purity standards than conventional methods. However, the efficacy of these systems remains inconsistent due to the high proportion of mixed waste and legacy waste in the urban area, which often overwhelms the treatment capacity during peak tourist seasons.

Complementing these physical interventions is the "Uttarakhand Anti Littering and Anti Spitting Act 2016," which provides a legal framework for the Municipal Corporation to impose fines ranging from ₹200 to ₹5,000. Despite these measures, enforcement has faced challenges with public cooperation and the management of "garbage-vulnerable points" across the city.

=== Water pollution ===
The Ganges River, which emerges from the Himalayas at Rishikesh, faces significant pollution issues. Despite being relatively unaffected by pollution at its source, the river shows high levels of contamination in the urban stretches of Rishikesh and Haridwar. A study by Doon University found "very high presence of pollutants" in these areas, including anti-inflammatory drugs, antibiotics, and other pharmaceutical compounds.

=== Air quality ===
Rishikesh also faces significant air quality challenges despite its spiritual and natural significance. The Central Pollution Control Board (CPCB) regularly monitors the city's ambient air quality through the National Air Quality Management Programme (NAMP). The primary pollutant of concern is Particulate Matter (PM10), which consistently exceeded prescribed national standards from 2012 to 2017, while sulfur dioxide and nitrogen dioxide levels remained within limits. Major sources of air pollution for Rishikesh include road dust, vehicular emissions, domestic fuel burning, open waste burning, and construction activities. Rishikesh has implemented several mitigation measures. As of 2018, the city had 3,098 diesel-driven commercial vehicles over 15 years old, with plans to ban such vehicles and increase the number of pollution emission checking centers from 10 to 30. Other efforts include increased surveillance of vehicle pollution levels, implementation of the "Uttarakhand Anti Littering and Anti Spitting Act 2016", and fines for burning municipal waste. Despite these initiatives, Rishikesh continues to struggle with bringing PM10 levels within prescribed limits, indicating the need for more stringent air pollution control strategies.

=== Waste management ===
The rapid growth in tourism has strained Rishikesh's waste management systems. Inadequate waste disposal and lack of proper recycling facilities have led to the accumulation of non-biodegradable waste in and around the city. There is a big landfill/trenching ground that is situated in the middle of the city in Govindnagar. This landfill site has been a source of environmental concern for various reasons. As per an estimate from 2021, the city generates approximately 1,800 metric tonnes of waste monthly, including 700 tonnes of wet waste, 500 tonnes of dry waste, and 600 tonnes of mixed waste. The high proportion of mixed waste has been causing difficulties in ensuring proper waste segregation at the source. The landfill's central location poses environmental and health risks, potentially contributing to soil and groundwater pollution, as well as attracting disease-carrying pests. Studies in nearby areas have revealed elevated levels of heavy metals in groundwater, making it unsuitable for drinking. The accumulation of legacy waste is a significant issue, prompting the installation of a legacy waste treatment plant at the Govindnagar trenching ground in recent years. While efforts are being made to improve waste management, the landfill's central location remains a major environmental and public health concern for Rishikesh, a city renowned for its spiritual and touristic appeal.

== Tourism ==
In the 2021–2022 fiscal year, Rishikesh had the highest revenue per hotel room among Indian tourist leisure destinations with an average of ₹10,042 per night. Only four tourist places in India attract more foreign tourists than Rishikesh. The town is one of the favorites of Israeli tourists, who often come here after completing their mandatory IDF service.

=== Yoga "capital" ===
Since ancient times, the location has served as a haven for yogis, saints, and practitioners who come there to learn about this traditional Indian practise, advance their understanding of it, become instructors, or even find enlightenment.

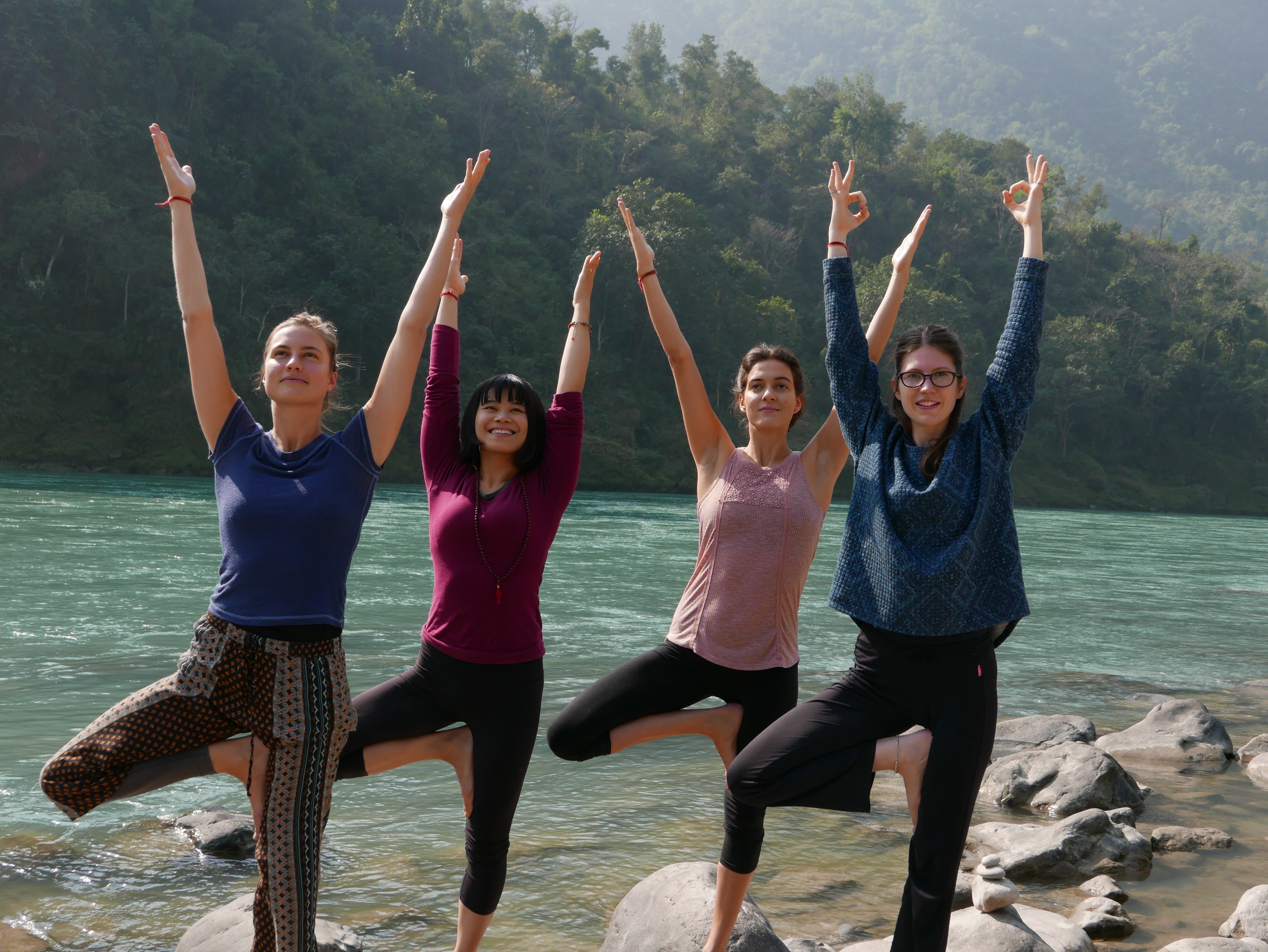
Students from around the world undergoing yoga teacher training by the River Ganges at Rishikesh, 2015

Although Rishikesh has always been a popular tourist destination due to its status as the birthplace of yoga, the city gained more fame when the Beatles visited in 1968. In February 1968, the Beatles visited Maharishi Mahesh Yogi's ashram in Rishikesh, attracted by his transcendental meditation. The Beatles composed numerous songs during their time at the ashram, many of which appear on the band's self-titled double album, also known as the "White Album". Western fans arrived seeking similar experiences, resulting in new yoga and meditation centers that fueled Rishikesh's nickname as the "Yoga Capital of the World". Many of these Westerners have undergone training to become certified yoga teachers.

=== Activities ===
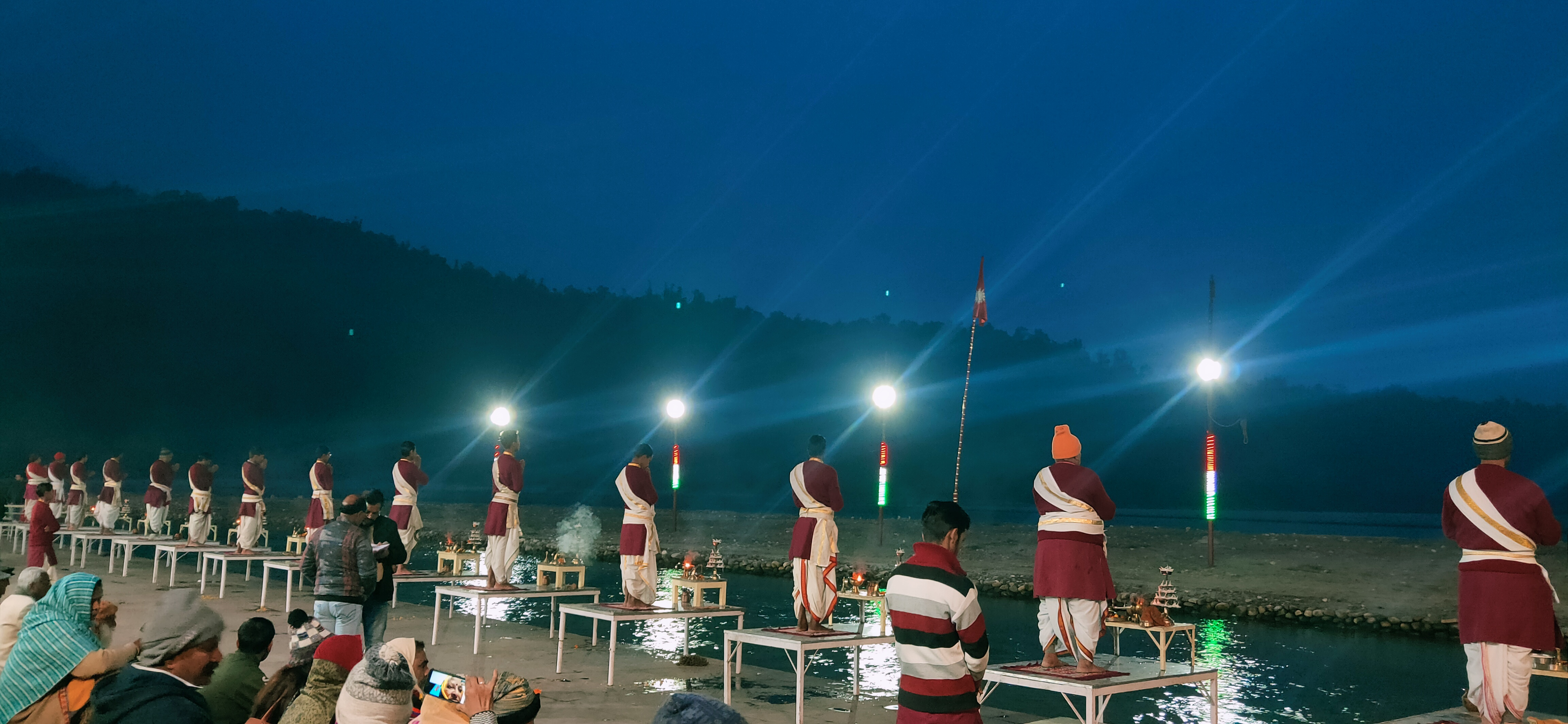
Ganga Aarti At Triveni Ghat

The Ganga Aarti (also known as Maha Aarthi) is performed at dusk at the Triveni Ghat. This popular Hindu religious ritual involves playing music and providing religious offerings to the fire.

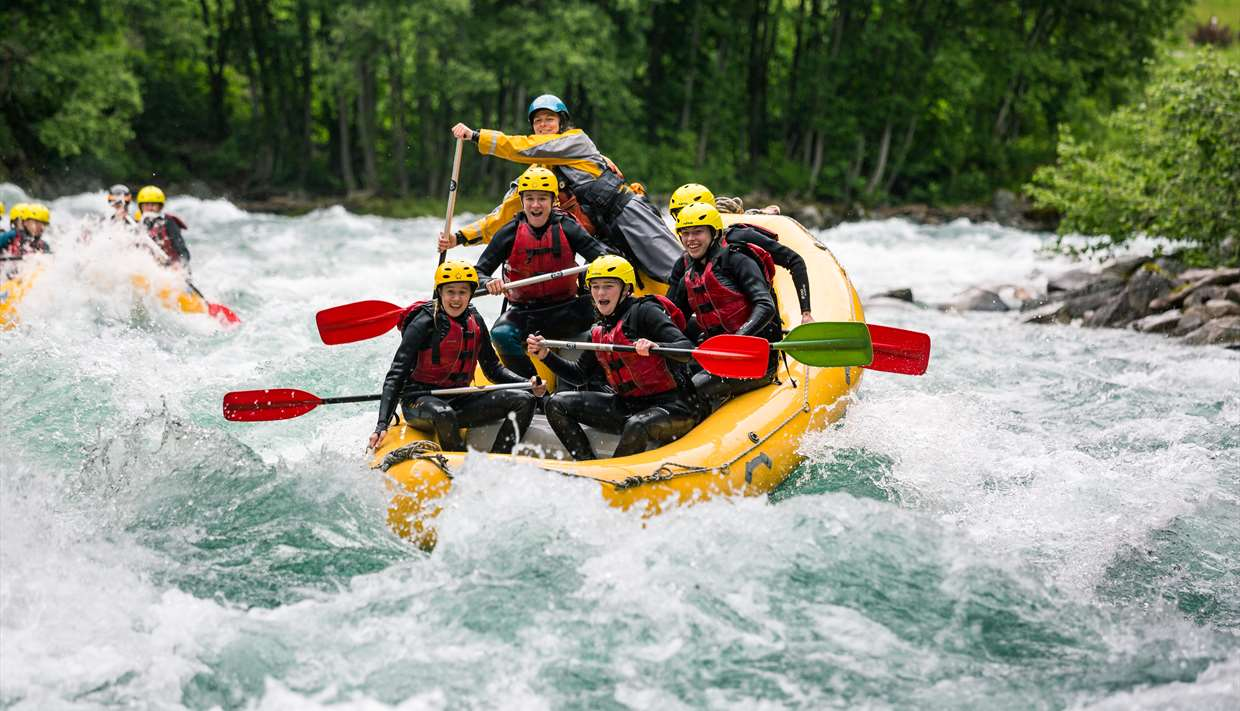
Rafting in Rishikesh

The Ram Jhula and Lakshman Jhula suspension bridges are accompanied by temples with additional ashrams near Swargashram along the eastern riverbank. The city's Sivananda Nagar houses the Sivananda Ashram and Divine Life Society, founded by Swami Sivananda.

Neelkanth Mahadev Temple is located in the forest, 28 km (17 mi) from Rishikesh, while Vashishtha Guha, a cave used by the sage Vashishtha, is 21 km (13 mi) north of the area.

The Neergarh Waterfall, also known as Neer Gaddu or Neer Waterfall, is located about 5–7 km from Lakshman Jhula on the Rishikesh–Badrinath Highway. It is divided into two main points—Neergarh Waterfall I and II.

During the summer season, the area observes an influx of tourists due to clear water streams and pleasant weather. Two small bridges have been built across the waterfalls, and there are local shops that sell refreshments and act as a resting spots for visitors. To see the waterfall up close, people need to take a short trek through the trails.

Rishikesh offers many rafting options along the Ganges from Grades I-IV. Rishikesh has India's highest bungee jumping at 83 m (272 ft) over a rocky cliff.

The longest zipline in Asia is located in Rishikesh with a length of 1 km and speeds of 140 km per hour.

=== Impact of camps and adventure activities on River Ganga ===
According to environmental activists, "These camps are not only in violation of Forest (Conservation) Act 1980, but also the Environment (Protection) Act 1986, as well as the Water (Prevention and Control of Pollution) Act 1974, as it is leading to pollution of Ganga by discharging effluent, throwing of solid waste directly and adversely affecting the ecological integrity of the river system."

Environmental activists allege that these camps, which are established as temporary sites, do not have adequate sewage and sanitation facilities, disturb the habitat of wild animals, and "affect the peace, tranquility, and serenity of the forest area. [...] At the campsites, the camp owners permit employees and the visitors to have food and alcohol. They leave empty bottles, cans, unconsumed food and waste including bones and filth in and around the campsite."

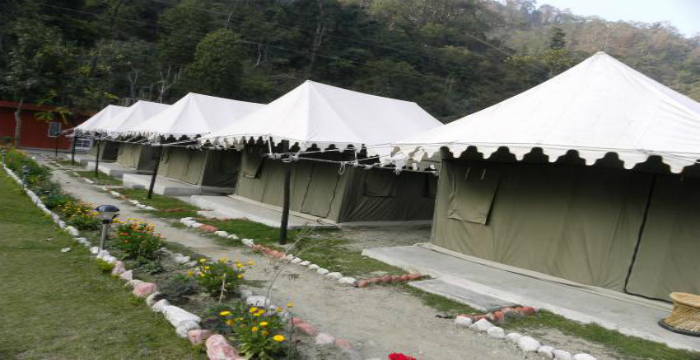
Camping in Rishikesh

In a 2008 study on the beach camps between Kaudiyala and Rishikesh, experts from the Govind Ballabh Pant Himalayan Environment and Development Institute—R. K. Maikhuri, Nihal Farukhi and Tarun Budhal—found that wildlife conservation standards and norms, particularly for waste management, were routinely disregarded.

A bench headed by the National Green Tribunal chairperson Justice Swatanter Kumar on 1 April 2015 heard a plea filed by the non-governmental organisation Social Action for Forest and Environment (SAFE). The National Green Tribunal has sought explanations from the Government of India and the Government of Uttarakhand on the "unregulated" operation of rafting camps on the banks of Ganga between Shivpuri and Rishikesh in Uttarakhand. The state government has assured the tribunal that it would not grant permission to any new camp till the next hearing in May.

A bench headed by Justice U. D. Salve has rejected permission to rafting camps operating in Rishikesh and slammed the Ministry of Environment and Forests and the Government of Uttarakhand for not filing their replies in the case and directed them to file their response.

== Healthcare ==
AIIMS Rishikesh is one of the six healthcare institutes being established by the Ministry of Health and Family Welfare, Government of India under the Pradhan Mantri Swasthya Suraksha Yojana (PMSSY) with the aim of correcting regional imbalances in quality tertiary level healthcare in the country and attaining self-sufficiency in graduate and postgraduate medical education and training.

The first AYUSH (Ayurveda, Yoga, Unani, Siddha and Homoeopathy) Centre was opened in Rishikesh on 4 June 2015 by Shripad Yasso Naik, the Minister for Yoga and Traditional Medicine, to sponsor new research in these alternative medicine systems.

== Transport ==
=== Rail ===
The Rishikesh and the Yog Nagari Rishikesh railway stations offer service to this city, partially through Indian Railways. A new railway line, connecting Rishikesh with Karnaprayag, is under construction.

=== Road ===
Rishikesh is connected with the state capital, Dehradun, which is 45 km from the city. Private and shared taxi services travel between Rishikesh and most major north Indian cities like Delhi, Chandigarh, and Shimla.

=== Air ===
The nearest airports are Dehradun Airport (15 km) and New Delhi International Airport (240 km).

== Incidents ==
The tourism sector has brought tourists illegally importing cannabis and alcohol. Incidents like partial nakedness and drug paraphernalia littered along beaches have produced criticism that Rishikesh is losing its spirituality.

== Gallery ==
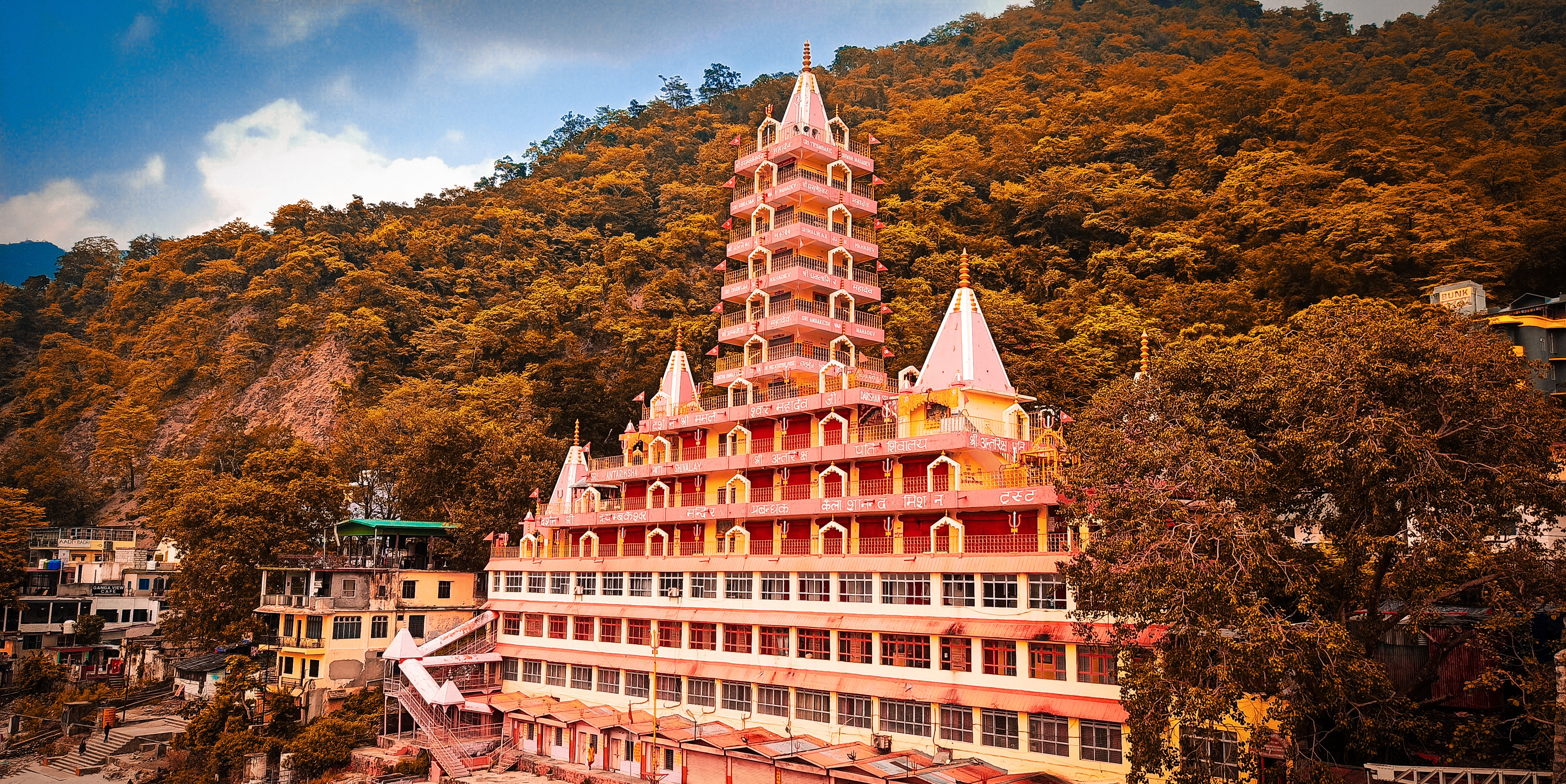
Tera Manzil Temple

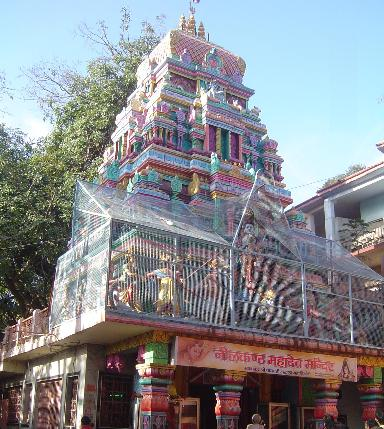
NeelKanth Mahadev Temple

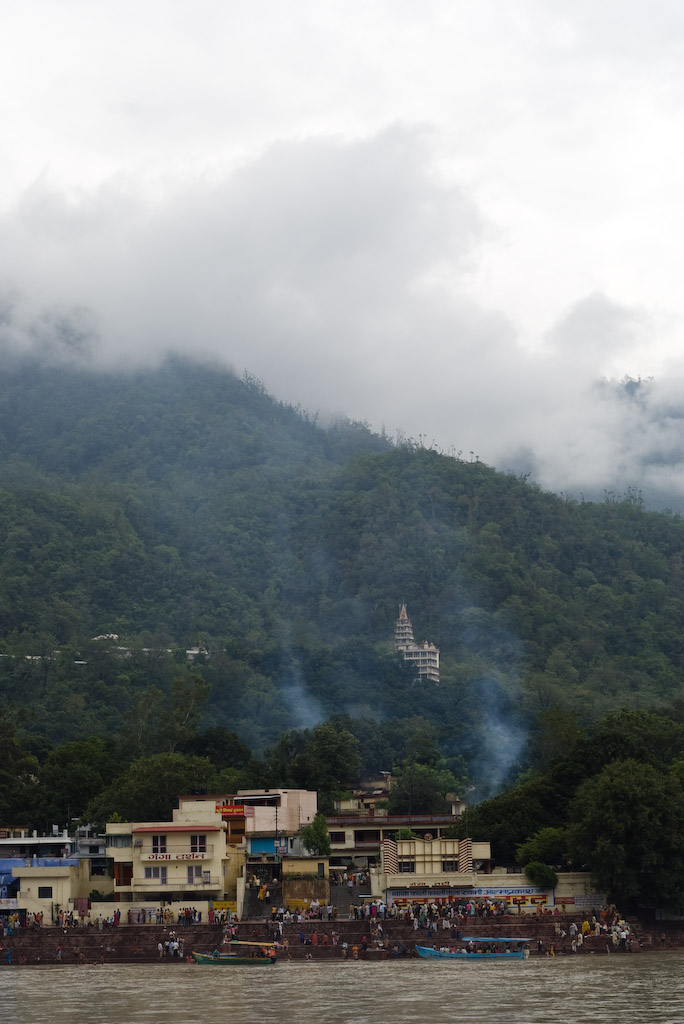
Ghats by the River Ganges

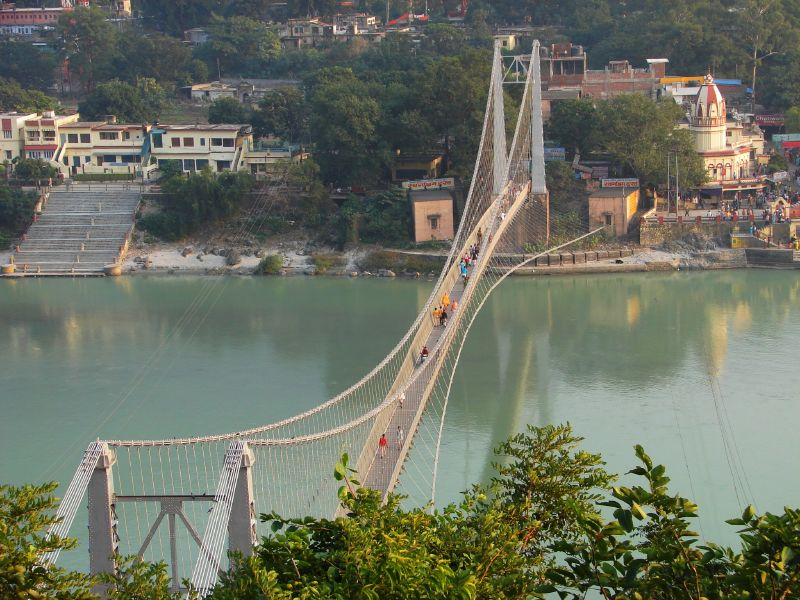
Ram Jhula Bridge across the Ganges at Muni Ki Reti, built in the 1980s

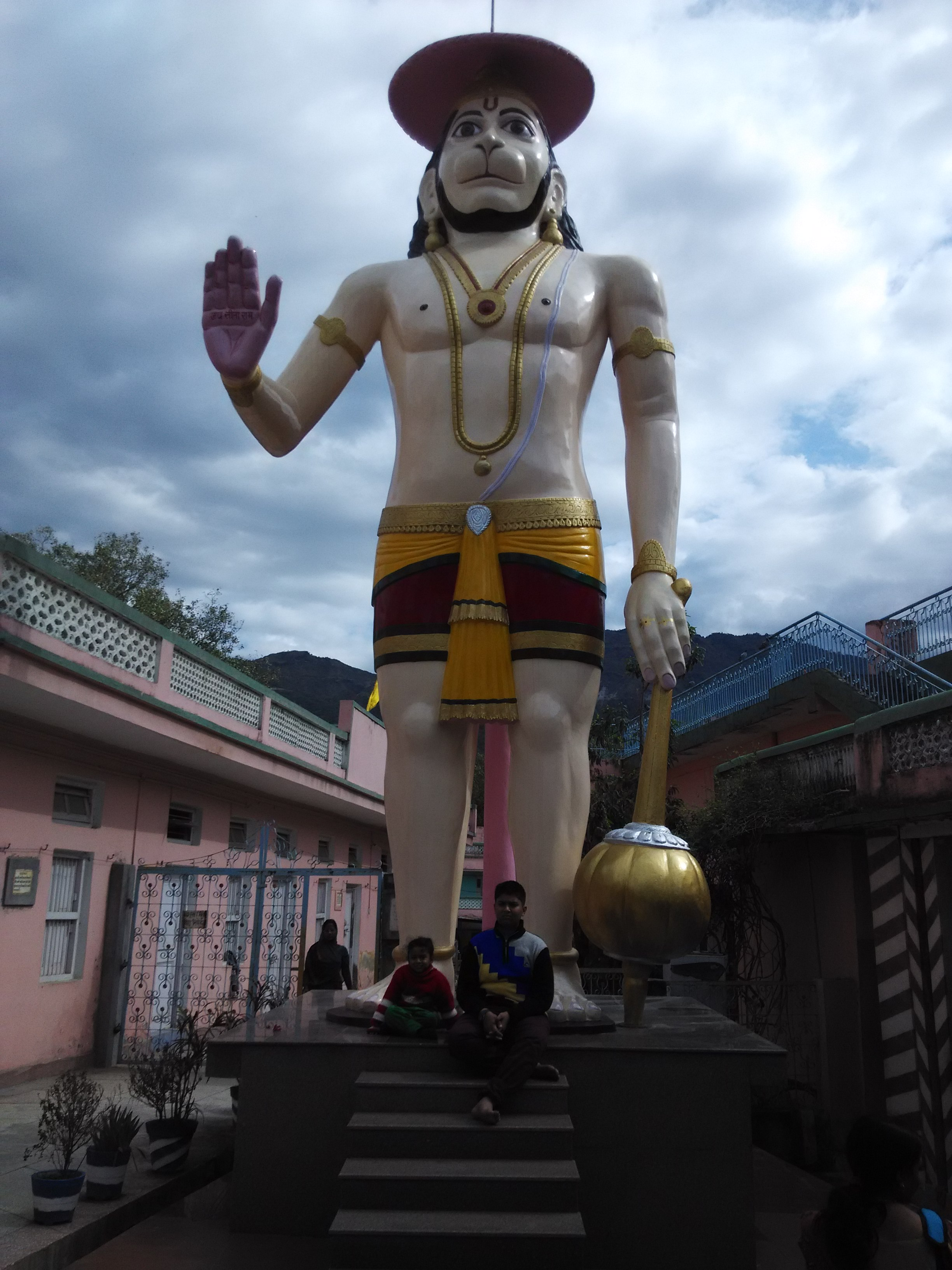
A Hanuman temple in Rishikesh

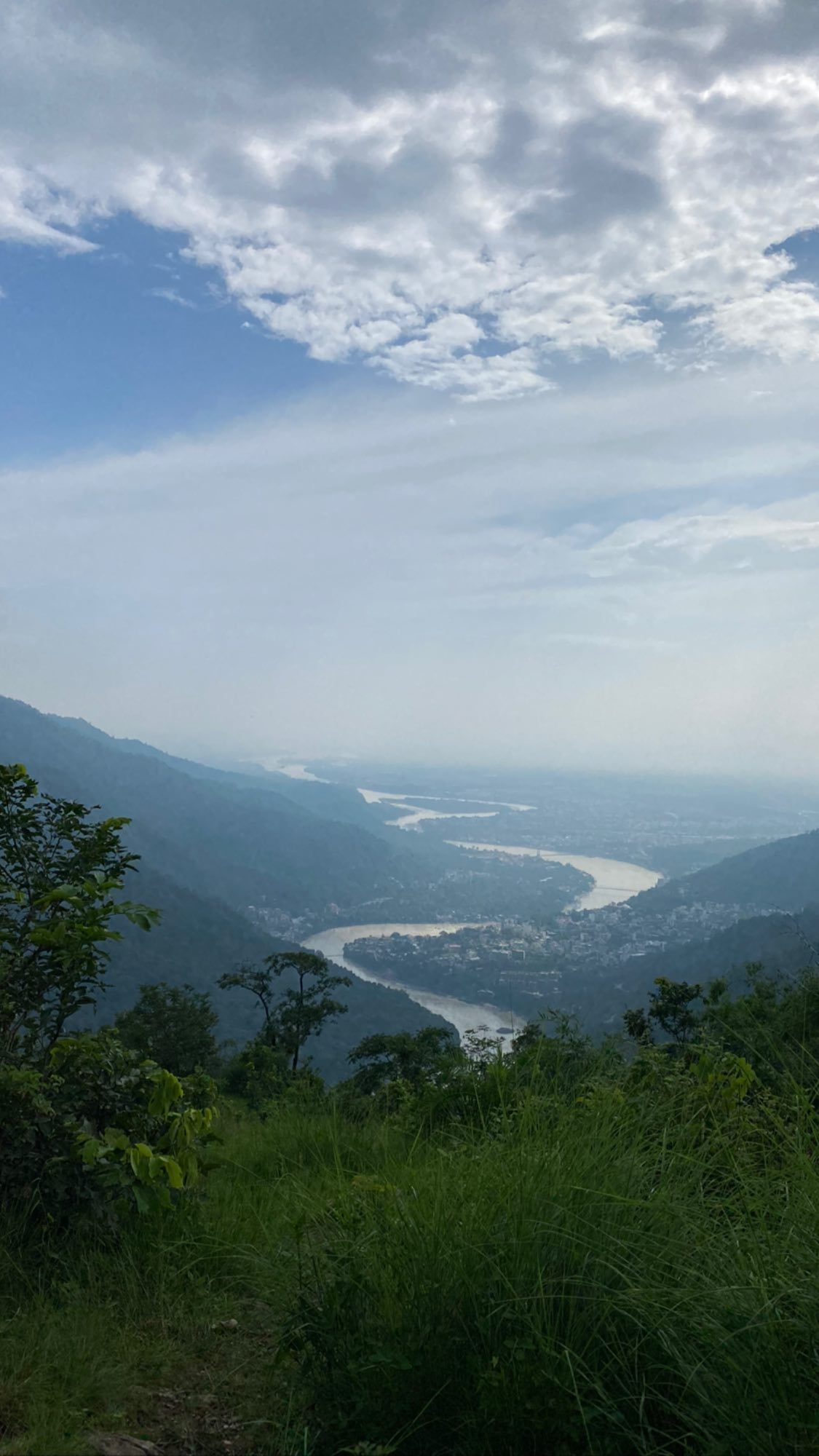
Rishikesh Views

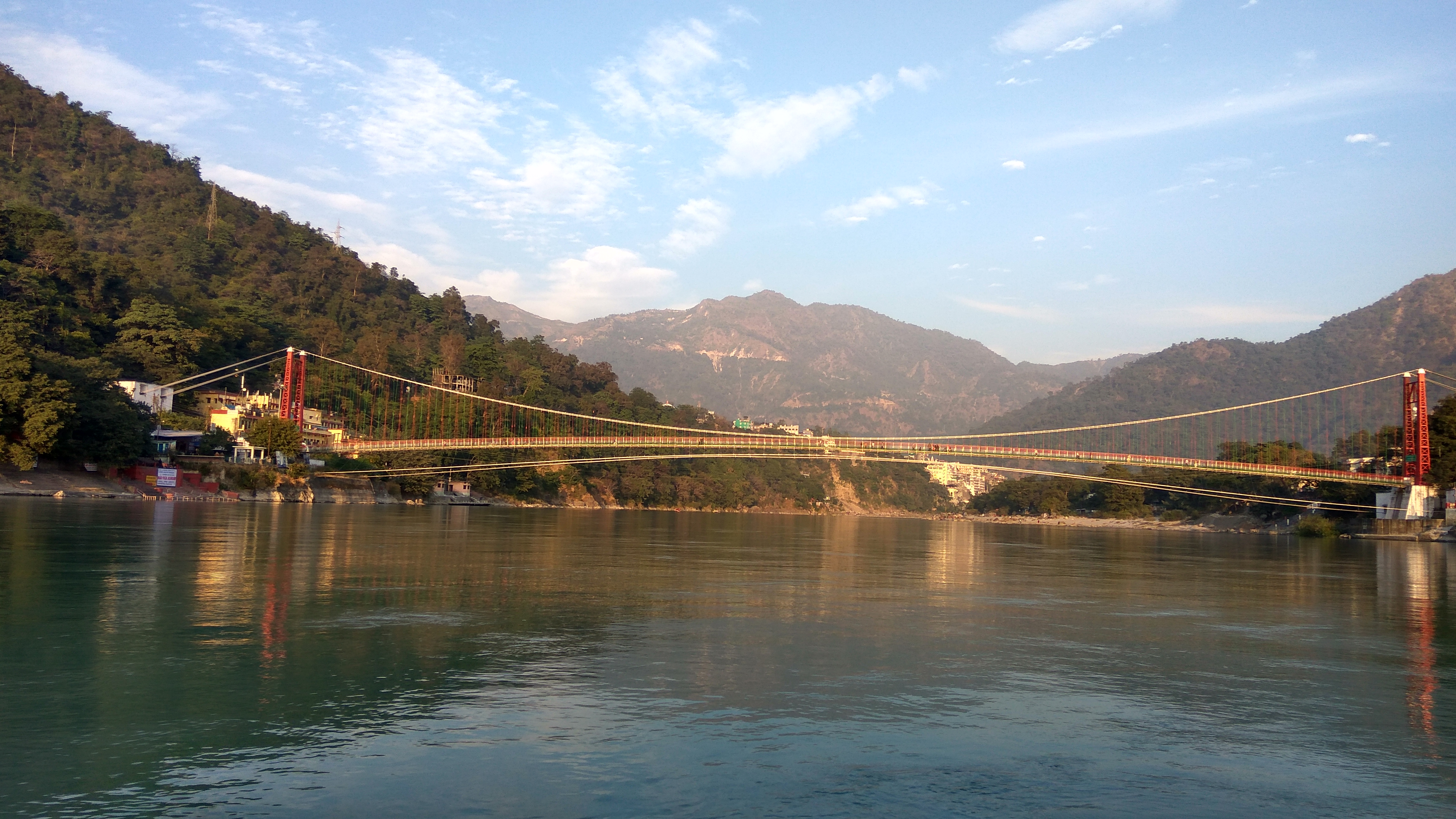
Lakshman Jhula

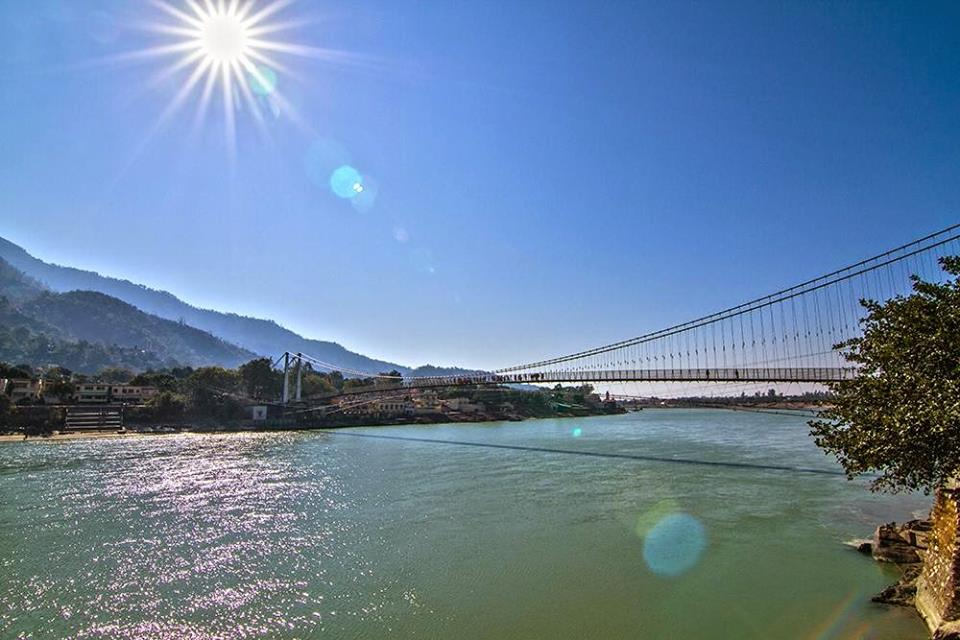
View of Rishikesh

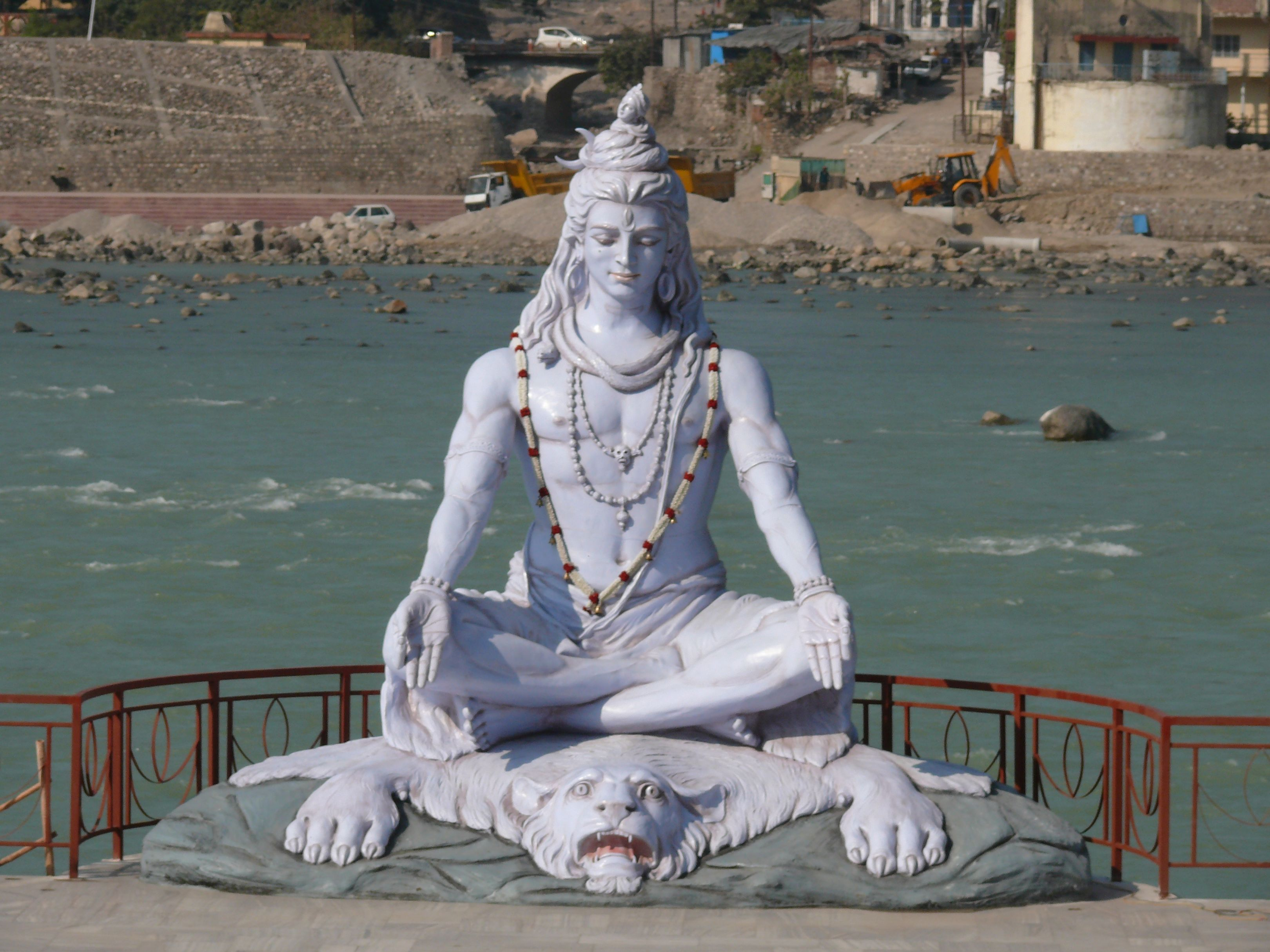
Shiva statue near Parmarth Niketan which was washed away by the 2013 flood on River Ganga

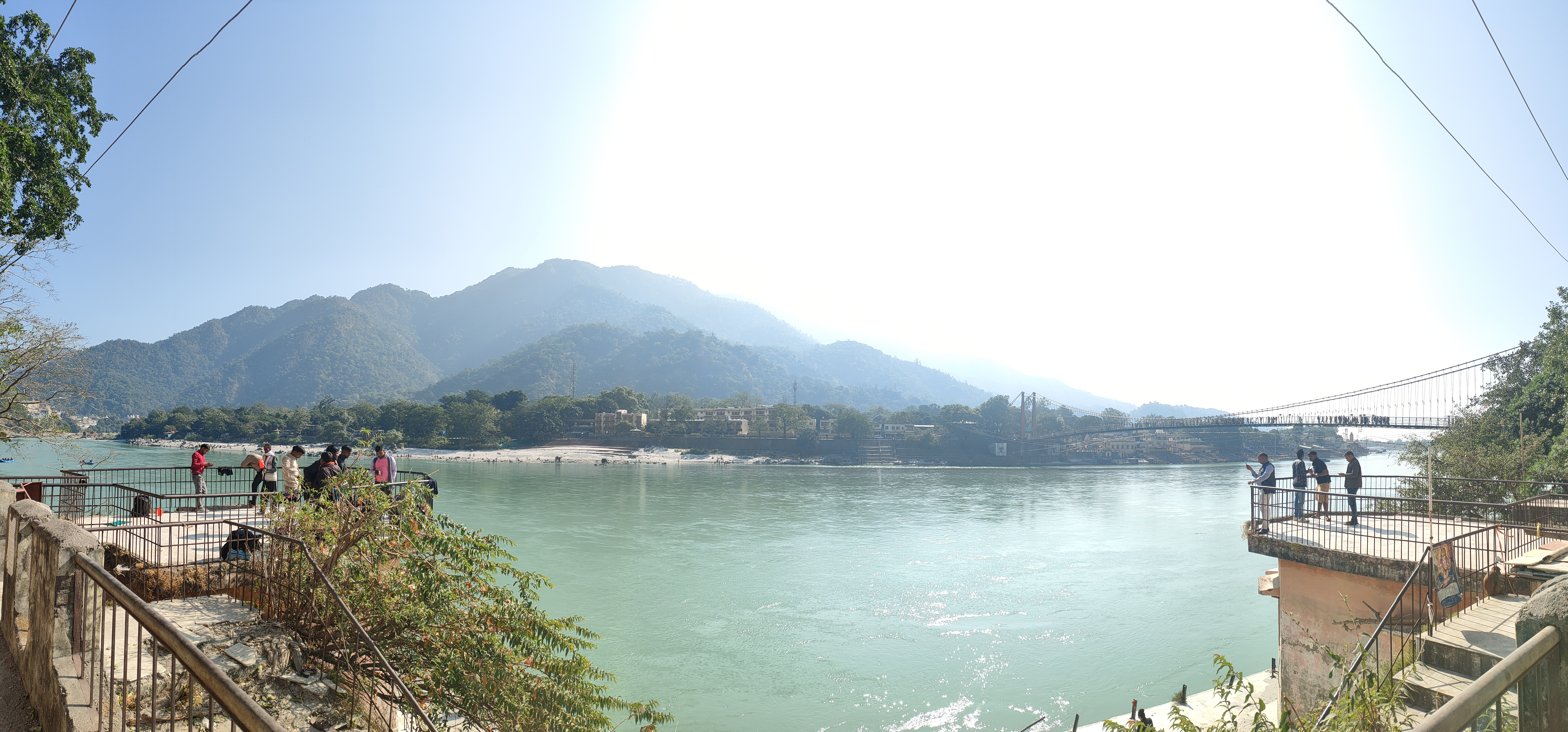
View of Rishikesh with Ganga River and Hills in Background

== See also ==
- Parmarth Niketan
- Lakshman Jhula
- Ram Jhula
- Muni Ki Reti
- Dhanraj Giri
- Beatles Ashram
