= Ram Jhula =

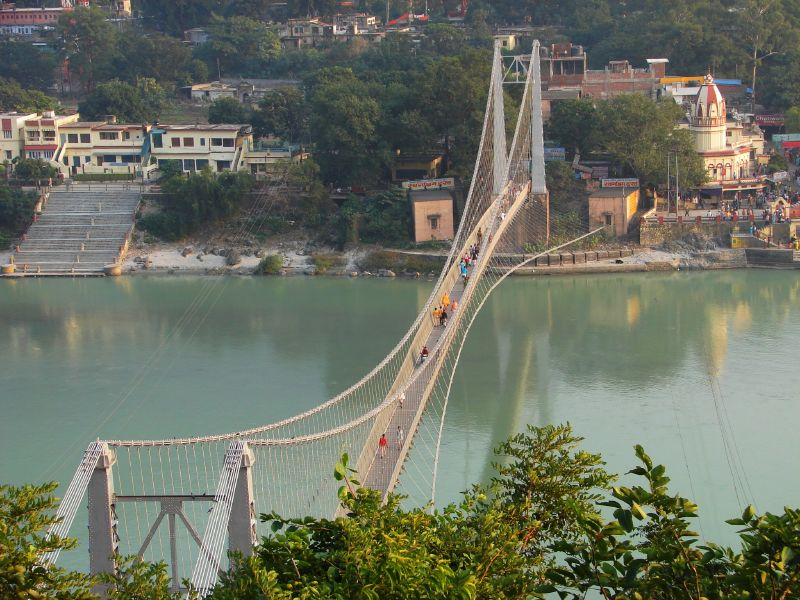
- Ram Jhula Bridge view from Muni Ki Reti
- Coordinates: 30.1233°N 78.3145°E
- Carries: Pedestrians and cyclists
- Crosses: River Ganges
- Locale: Rishikesh

Characteristics
- Design: Suspension bridge

History
- Opened: 1986

Location
- Interactive map of Ram Jhula

Ram Jhula (Hindi: राम झूला) is an iron suspension bridge across the river Ganges, located 3 kilometres (1.9 mi) northeast of the city of Rishikesh in Uttarakhand, India. The bridge connects the Sivananda Nagar area of Muni Ki Reti in Tehri Garhwal district to the Swargashram area in Pauri Garhwal district, crossing the river from west to east. Built in 1986, the bridge is one of the iconic landmarks of Rishikesh.

There are many Hindu ashrams and religious centers established on both sides of the Ganges. Ram Jhula is also a connecting bridge between Sivananda Ashram located in Muni Ki Reti to Gita Bhawan, Parmarth Niketan and other temples located in Swargashram. Though similar in design, this bridge is bigger than Lakshman Jhula, which is 2 kilometres (1.2 mi) up the river. This bridge is constructed with a span of 750 feet (230 m).

Motorbikes and two wheelers had been restricted from crossing on the bridge and only pedestrian access remained allowed as of 2023 as reported by The Hindu. As of 2025, the bridge is completely closed as reported by Dainik Jagran newspaper.
