= Lakshman Jhula =

Footbridge across the Ganges in Uttarakhand, India

Coordinates: 30°7′34.9″N 78°19′47.6″E

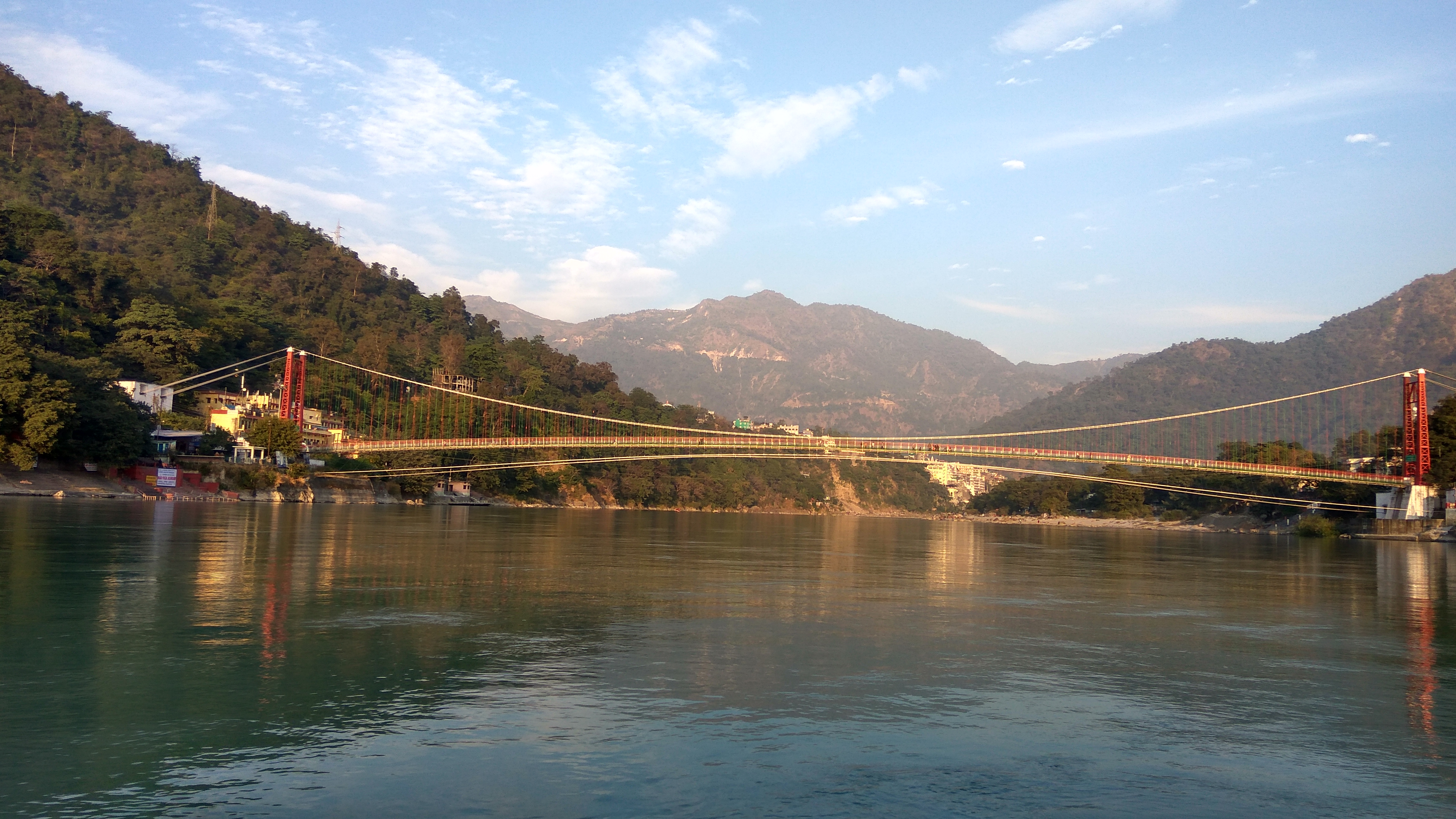
Lakshman Jhula Bridge

Lakshman Jhula is a historic suspension bridge across the river Ganges, located northeast of Rishikesh in Uttarakhand, India. The bridge connects the village of Tapovan with Jonk and has been closed to traffic since 2020 due to safety concerns.

== Geography ==
It is located 5 kilometres (3 mi) north-east of the city of Rishikesh in the Indian state of Uttarakhand. The bridge connects the villages of Tapovan to Jonk. Tapovan is in Tehri Garhwal district, on the west bank of the river, while Jonk is in Pauri Garhwal district, on the east bank. Lakshman Jhula used to be a pedestrian bridge also used by motorbikes. It is located on the outskirts of the city. It is a landmark of Rishikesh. A larger bridge 2 kilometres (1.2 mi) downstream from Lakshman Jhula is Ram Jhula.

== History ==
As of November 5, 2020, this bridge is restricted to pedestrian access and is set to be closed permanently when a replacement is built parallel to it. Barriers on both sides prevent vehicular traffic including motorcycles and scooters.

It is said that the Hindu deity Lakshmana crossed the Ganges on jute ropes where the bridge is found. Lakshman Jhula was completed in 1929.

Two plaques exist at the foot of the west side of the bridge.

The first plaque reads:

Lakshman Jhula Bridge
First Jeepable Suspension Bridge of U.P.
Span - 450 feet
Carriage Way - 6 feet

This bridge was constructed by U.P.P.W.D. during 1927-1929. It replaces the old bridge of 284 feet span which was washed away by great floods of October, 1924. This was opened to traffic on 11 April 1930.
Officers / Officials responsible include:
1. Chief Engineer - P. H. Tillard
2. Superintending Engineer - E. H. Cornelius
3. Executive Engineer - C. F. Hunter
4. Assistant Engineers - Jagdish Prasad, Avadh Narain
5. Overseer - Babu Ram

The second plaque reads:

Lakshman Jhuala Suspension Bridge
Span - 450 feet
Height of roadway above mean summer water level - 59 feet

Opened to traffic by H.E. Sir Malcolm Haley C.C.I.E. K.C.S.I. Governor of the United Provinces on 11 April 1930. This bridge was constructed by the Public Works Department during the years 1927-1929. It replaces the old bridge of 284 feet span, which was the gift of Rai Bahadur Surajmal Jhunjhunwala father of Rai Bahadur Shewpershad Tulshan, and was situated about 200 feet down stream. This was washed away by the great flood of October, 1924 which undermined the left abutment. The extra cost of rebuilding this new bridge as nearly as possible on the site of the old bridge has been contributed by Rai Bahadur Shewpershad Tulshan to perpetuate the honored memory of his father and no toll or tax will ever be imposed or realized for crossing this bridge.

== Gallery ==
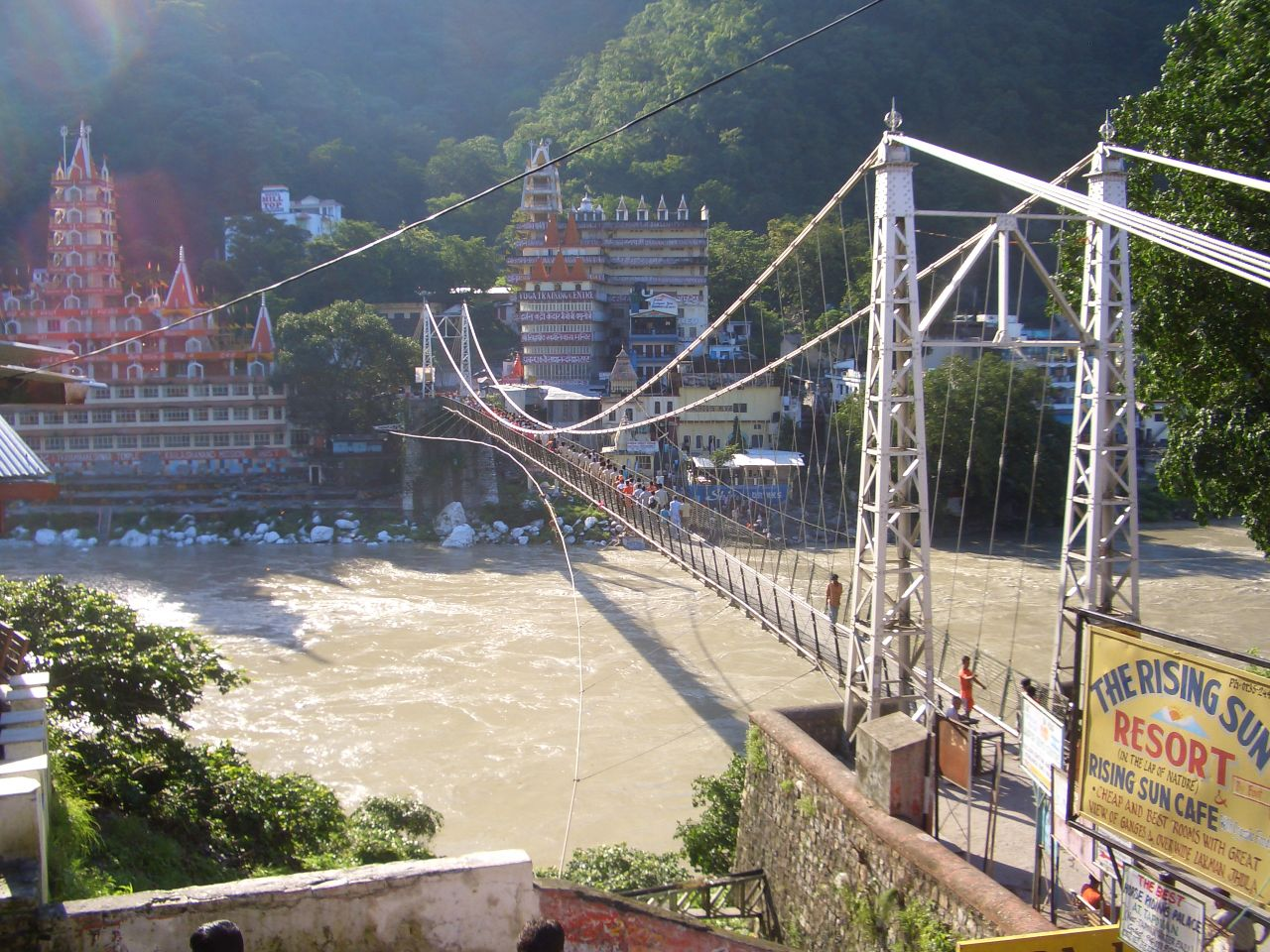
A view of the bridge.

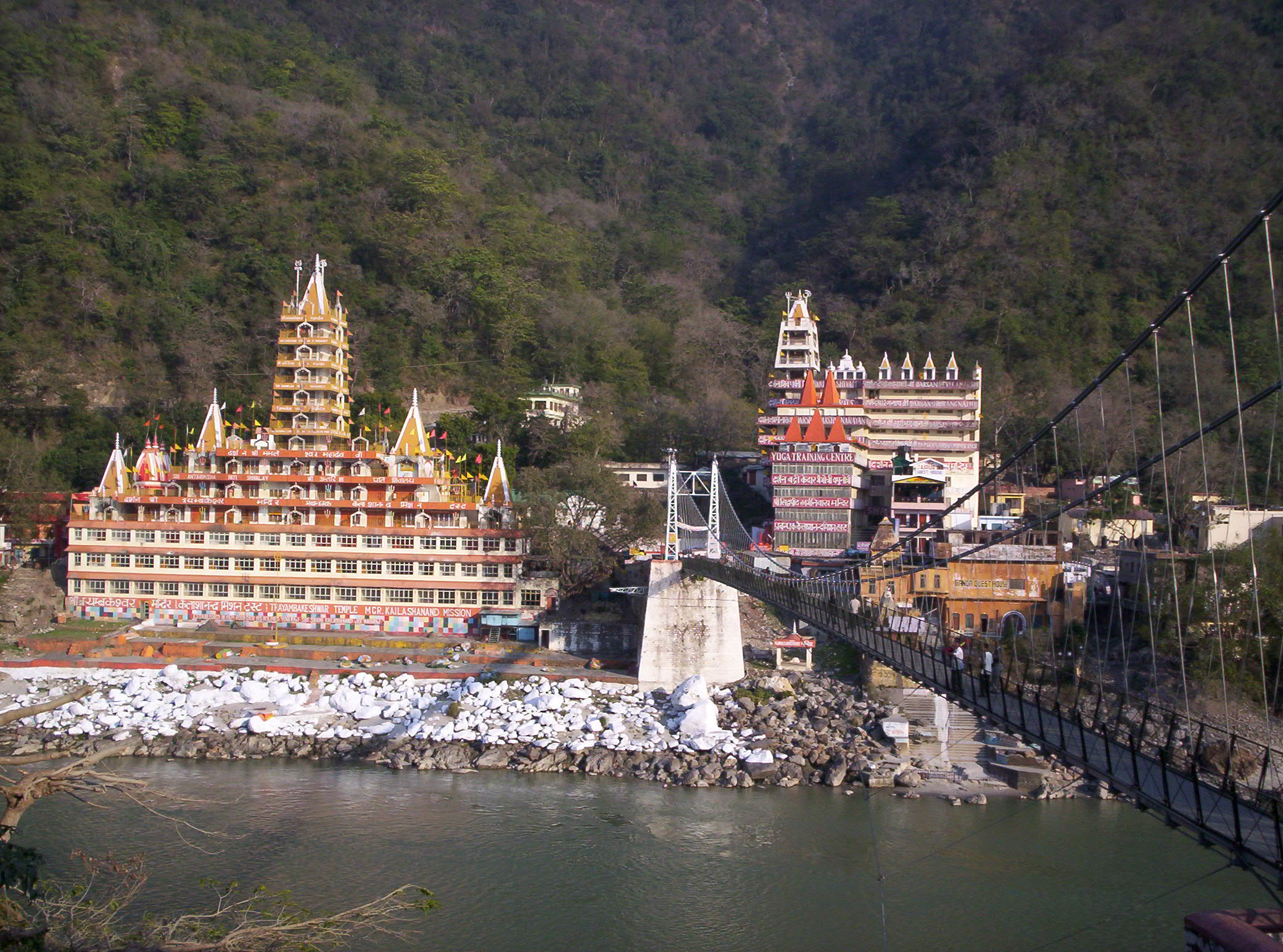

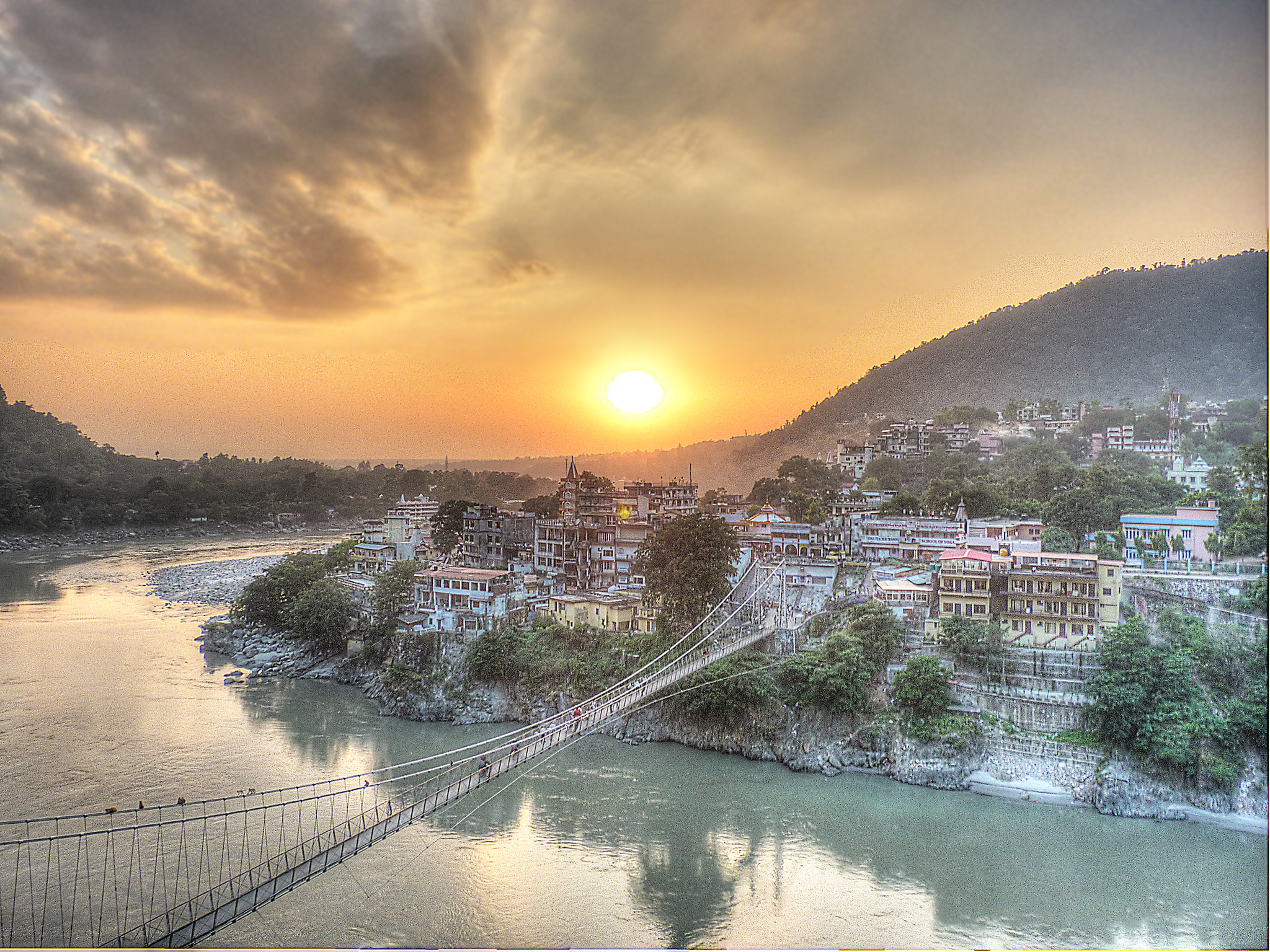

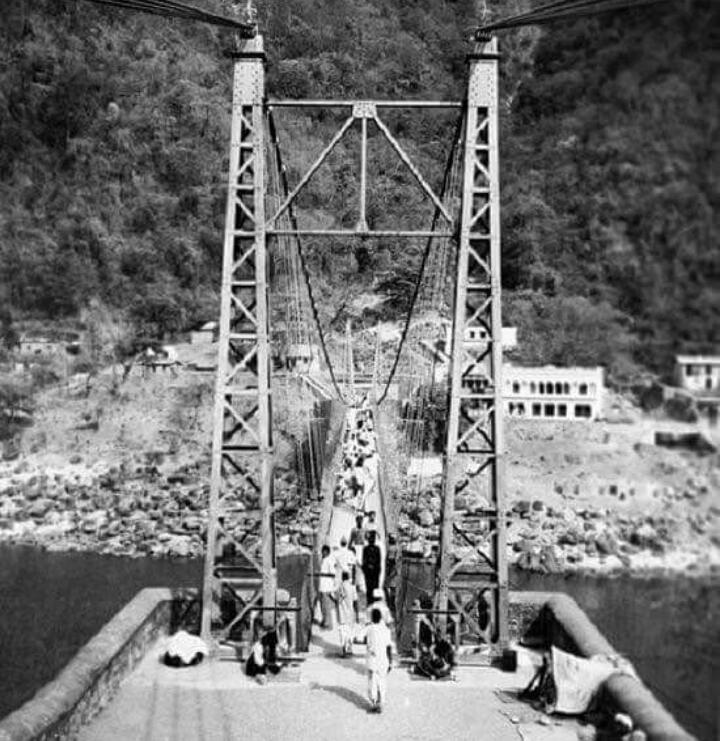
the bridge and area before major commercial development
