= Pattie Boyd =

English model and photographer (born 1944)

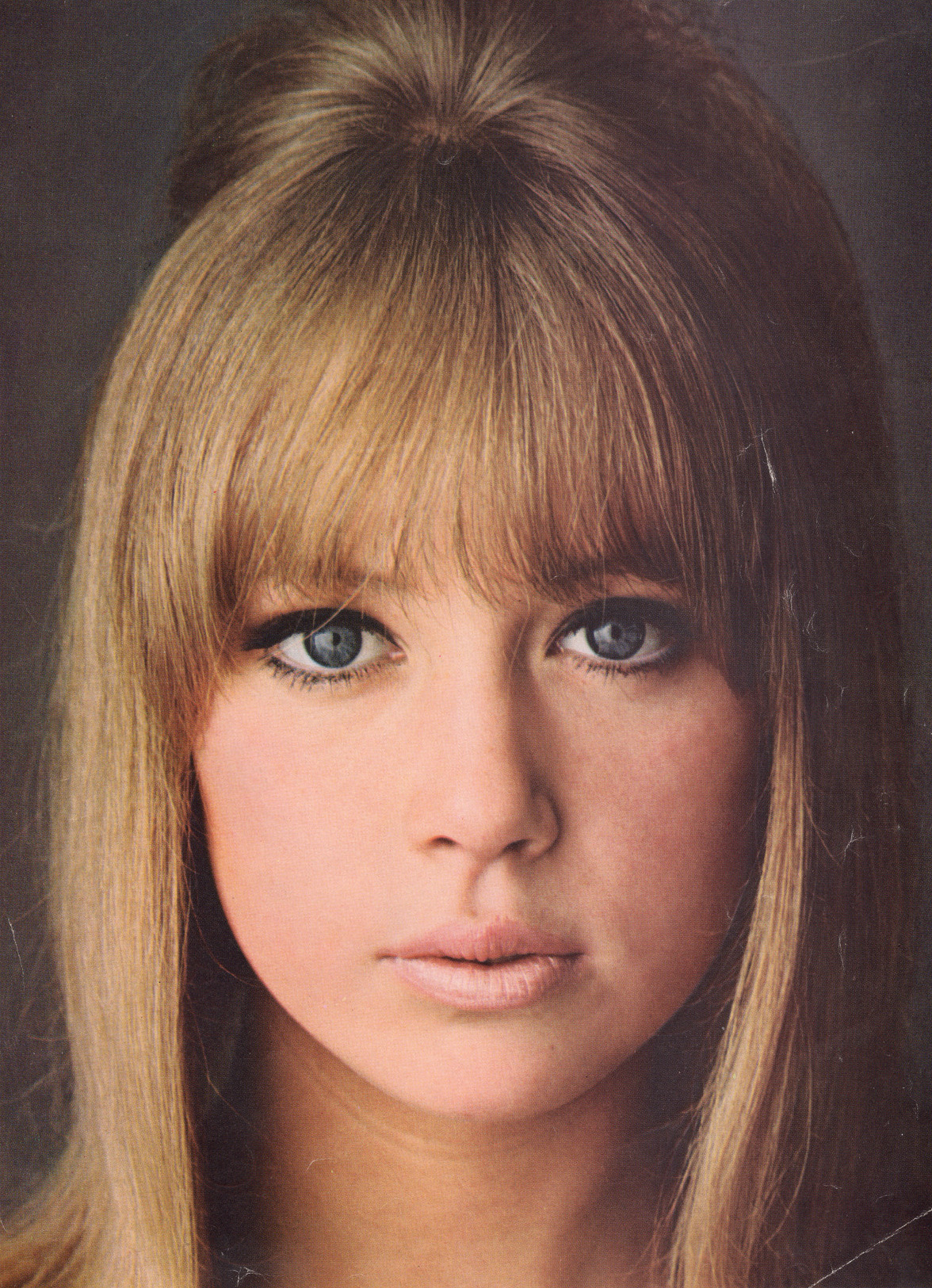
- Boyd in 1965
- Born: Patricia Anne Boyd; 17 March 1944 (age 82); Taunton, Somerset, England
- Occupations: Model, photographer
- Years active: 1961–present
- Spouses: George Harrison (m. 1966; div. 1977); Eric Clapton (m. 1979; div. 1989); Rod Weston (m. 2015)
- Modelling information
- Height: 5 ft 6 in (168 cm)
- Hair colour: Blonde
- Eye colour: Blue
- Website: pattieboyd.co.uk

Patricia Anne Boyd (born 17 March 1944) is a retired English model and photographer. Boyd married George Harrison in 1966, experiencing the height of the Beatles' popularity and sharing their embrace of Indian spirituality. She divorced Harrison in 1977 and married mutual friend Eric Clapton in 1979; they divorced in 1989. Boyd inspired Harrison's songs "I Need You", "If I Needed Someone", "Something", and "For You Blue", and Clapton's songs "Layla", "Bell Bottom Blues", and "Wonderful Tonight".

In August 2007, Boyd published her autobiography Wonderful Today (titled Wonderful Tonight in the United States). Her photographs of Harrison and Clapton, titled Through the Eye of a Muse, have been exhibited.

== Early life ==
Boyd was born on 17 March 1944 in Taunton, Somerset, the first child of Colin ("Jock") Ian Langdon Boyd and Diana Frances Boyd (née Drysdale). The Boyds moved to West Lothian in Scotland, where her brother, Colin, was born in 1946. They then moved to Guildford, Surrey, where her sister Jenny was born in 1947. After Jock's discharge from the Royal Air Force, the Boyds lived in Nairobi from 1948 to 1953. Boyd's youngest sister, Paula, was born at a hospital in Nakuru, Kenya, in 1951.

From the age of eight, Boyd boarded at Nakuru School near Nairobi. During a half-term break, she returned home and was shocked to learn that her parents had divorced. In December 1953, she and her siblings moved to England with Diana and her new husband, Bobbie Gaymer-Jones. With her mother's second marriage, Boyd gained two half-brothers, David (b. 1954) and Robert ("Boo"; b. 1955). Many years later, she learned that she had two half-sisters through Jock's second marriage.

Boyd briefly attended Hazeldean School in Putney, and then the St Agnes and St Michael Convent Boarding School in East Grinstead, and St Martha's Convent in Hadley Wood, Hertfordshire. She achieved three GCE O level passes in 1961. She moved to London the same year and through her mother found work as a trainee beautician, age 17, at Elizabeth Arden's Bond Street salon. A client who worked for Honey magazine then inspired her to join an agency and begin work as a fashion model.

== Career ==
=== Modelling ===
Boyd began her fashion career in 1962, modelling at first in London and Paris. Among her regular assignments at that time were jobs for the UK edition of Vogue, Vanity Fair, Elle in France, and Honey, as well as fashion spreads in newspapers such as The Daily Telegraph and The Times. She was photographed by David Bailey, Terence Donovan and Brian Duffy, among others, and appeared on the cover of British Vogue. Other popular models of the day, such as Twiggy, based their modeling appearance on Boyd. (Note: Kim Kerrigan, who had a natural resemblance to Boyd, changed her first name from Patsy in 1964, to avoid the perception that she and the agency representing her might be attempting to "cash in" on Boyd's popularity.) In the description of journalist Tom Hibbert, Boyd and Jean Shrimpton became "international celebrities" as the embodiment of the "British female 'look' – mini-skirt, long, straight hair and wide-eyed loveliness". This look defined Western fashion for women as a result of the international popularity of the Beatles and other British Invasion musical acts from 1964 onwards. In her autobiography, Boyd recalls being known as the muse to designer Ossie Clark, who used to call some of his designs "Pattie". (Note: Boyd's first name was often abbreviated to "Patti" also.)

George Harrison at a Beatles press conference in June 1964. Boyd's demand as a model was greatly increased by her romantic involvement with Harrison.

In early 1964, Boyd appeared in a television advertising campaign for Smith's crisps, directed by Richard Lester. Lester then cast her as a schoolgirl in the Beatles' 1964 film A Hard Day's Night, where she met and befriended the group's lead guitarist, George Harrison. (Note: Her only line in the film was "Prisoners?" She later appeared in the "I Should Have Known Better" song segment.) Boyd's modelling career skyrocketed as a result of her subsequent romantic involvement with Harrison. She recalls that further assignments for Vogue and Vanity Fair were the result, along with jobs for Tatler (with photographer Jeanloup Sieff), more TV commercials, for Smith's and for L'Oréal's Dop shampoo brand, and advertisements in newspaper fashion pages.

Boyd and Harrison were among the leading couples in the Swinging London era, when, according to a 1966 article in the Daily Express, "actors, pop singers, hairdressers, and models" were London's new "privileged class". UK underground writer Barry Miles later described her as "by far the most glamorous" of all the Beatles' wives and girlfriends, while author Shawn Levy writes that, even more than Jane Asher, the London-born stage actress who was Paul McCartney's girlfriend for much of the 1960s, Boyd epitomised what "sixties stardom was meant to confer upon its chosen". (Note: Levy adds: "That was why a provincial boy learned how to play bar chords and sing harmony and hitchhiked down the Great Northern Road to the capital!") Writing in 1966, British fashion designer Mary Quant commented that it had become a requisite for contemporary women to strive "to look like Pattie Boyd rather than Marlene Dietrich", adding: "Their aim is to look childishly young, naïvely unsophisticated, and it takes more sophistication to work out that look than those early would-be sophisticates ever dreamed of."

At the request of Gloria Stavers, Boyd began writing a column, titled "Patti's Letter from London", for the American teen magazine 16. According to Hibbert: "She reported on the latest trends in Carnaby Street, informed readers as to what the Beatles and Stones were wearing at the moment, and gave advice on how to turn dark and curly hair straight and blonde." But as Boyd became the target of hostility from the Beatles' female fans, Harrison insisted she abandon her career, to ensure their privacy. In July 1968, she and her sister Jenny, who was also a model, opened a boutique in London's fashionable Chelsea Market. They named it "Jennifer Juniper" after Donovan's song of the same name. Jenny managed the shop, which sold antiques and other objets d'art, while Boyd was the buyer.

Boyd says she had "virtually given up" modelling by the early 1970s. She resumed her career at that time, promoting designs by Ossie Clark. She and Twiggy then did a cover assignment in Milan for Italian Vogue with photographer Justin de Villeneuve, and, working again with Bailey, Boyd appeared on several covers for British Vogue. In another shoot for the latter magazine, Boyd and her sisters were photographed by Patrick Lichfield.

=== Photography ===
Boyd began taking photographs of musicians and other friends during the 1960s and was a member of the Royal Photographic Society. In a 2008 interview, she said that it was not until 2004 that she felt "emotionally ready" to revisit the images. She also said that her lack of professional status probably made for a more intimate and authentic mood in her work, since her subjects were relaxed in her company.

Boyd first exhibited her photos of Harrison and Clapton at the San Francisco Art Exchange on Valentine's Day 2005, in a show titled Through the Eye of a Muse. The exhibition appeared in San Francisco and London during 2006, and in La Jolla, California in 2008. Through the Eye of a Muse was also shown in Dublin; in November 2008 at Toronto's The Great Hall Gallery; at the Blender Gallery in Sydney; and in Almaty, Kazakhstan, in 2009–2010.

Her exhibition Yesterday and Today: The Beatles and Eric Clapton was shown on Santa Catalina Island in California, and at the National Geographic Headquarters in Washington, DC, in 2011.

=== Charity work ===
Boyd became involved in charity work following her separation from Clapton in the late 1980s. In 1991, she co-founded SHARP (Self Help Addiction Recovery Program) with Barbara Bach, the second wife of former Beatle Ringo Starr.

== Personal life ==
=== Marriage to George Harrison ===
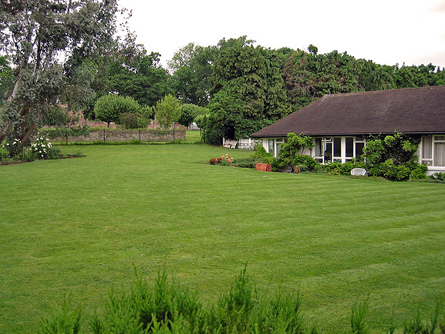
Kinfauns, the home of Pattie Boyd and George Harrison from 1965 to 1970

Boyd was in a relationship with photographer Eric Swayne when, at 19 (2 weeks away from her 20th birthday), she met Harrison, on 2 March 1964, and therefore declined his initial date request. Several days later, having ended the relationship with Swayne, she accompanied Harrison to a private gentlemen's club called the Garrick Club, chaperoned by the Beatles' manager, Brian Epstein. With the Beatles frequently away on concert tours, she and Harrison subsequently saw each other as often as their professional commitments allowed. In July 1964, Harrison bought Kinfauns, a house in Esher, Surrey, to escape the constant attention of fans in central London, and Boyd soon moved into the house.

Boyd had her first encounter with LSD in early 1965 when the couple's dentist, John Riley, secretly laced his guests' coffee with the drug during a dinner party at his home. As she was getting ready to leave with Harrison and John and Cynthia Lennon, Riley told them that he had spiked their drinks and tried to persuade them to stay. Outside, Boyd was in an agitated state from the drug and threatened to break a shop window, but Harrison pulled her away. Later, when Boyd and her group were in a lift on their way up to the Ad Lib Club, they mistakenly believed it was on fire.

The couple became engaged on 25 December 1965, and married on 21 January 1966 in a ceremony at Epsom register office. In his "How a Beatle Lives" profile in the Evening Standard in March 1966, Harrison stressed the equality of their relationship and credited Boyd with broadening his outlook. In September and October, after the Beatles' final concert tour, Boyd and Harrison spent six weeks in India, as guests of Indian classical musician Ravi Shankar. While in Bombay, as Harrison continued his sitar studies under Shankar's tutelage, Boyd began learning to play the dilruba, a bow-played string instrument. Due to the attention of fans and the press, they left the city with Shankar and stayed on houseboats on Dal Lake in Kashmir. On their return to England, Boyd and Harrison continued to adhere to a lifestyle of yoga and vegetarianism, and Boyd received further tutoring on the dilruba from Shiv Dayal Batish. (Note: Batish described her as a "smart student" who quickly mastered the basics of the instrument.)

On 25 June 1967, Boyd was among the crowd of friends who participated in the Beatles' Our World broadcast of "All You Need Is Love". (Note: She was also one of the chorus singers on "Yellow Submarine" in 1966 and sang the female vocal parts, with Yoko Ono, on the 1968 song "Birthday".) Boyd shared her husband's interest in Eastern mysticism. Having become a member of the Spiritual Regeneration Movement in February 1967, she was keen to meet the movement's leader, Maharishi Mahesh Yogi, and so suggested that she and Harrison attend his lecture on Transcendental Meditation at the London Hilton on 24 August. Impressed with the Maharishi, Harrison and Boyd, together with the other Beatles and their partners, travelled to a seminar he hosted in Bangor, Wales, the following day. Boyd and her sister Jenny then accompanied Harrison on the Beatles' visit to the Maharishi's ashram in Rishikesh, India, in February 1968. That same year, she told Beatles biographer Hunter Davies that the four Beatles had a bond that neither she nor any other wives could penetrate; she also said she wished that the band would use their fame and influence to publicly further a cause, as Marlon Brando had done on behalf of homeless children. Boyd provided inspiration for several of Harrison's Beatles compositions, including "I Need You", "If I Needed Someone", "Love You To", "Something" and "For You Blue". (Note: Harrison later cited alternative sources of inspiration for "Something". In early 1969, by which point he had befriended members of the Hare Krishna movement, he said that the song was about the Hindu deity Krishna.)

On 12 March 1969 (McCartney's wedding day to Linda), and as part of the perceived British authorities' less than tolerant attitude towards the Beatles during the late 1960s, both Boyd and Harrison were arrested at their home for possession of cannabis. They subsequently pleaded guilty and were fined £250 each.

In March 1970, a month before the Beatles' break-up, Boyd moved with Harrison to Friar Park, a Victorian neo-Gothic mansion in Henley-on-Thames. By this point, Harrison's devotion to Indian spirituality, particularly the Hare Krishna movement, had begun to divide the couple. They were also unsuccessful in starting a family, and Harrison would not consider adoption. (Note: Harrison told friends that he was infertile, a gesture that they realised was out of consideration for Boyd, given that he was able to father a child with his second wife, Olivia Arias.) Boyd resumed her modelling career in May 1971, in defiance of Harrison's spiritual convictions. In 1973, she had an affair with Faces guitarist Ronnie Wood while Harrison romanced Wood's wife Krissy. Boyd said her decision to leave Harrison, in July 1974, was based largely on his repeated infidelities, culminating in his affair with Starr's wife Maureen, which Boyd called "the final straw". (Note: Boyd characterised the last year of her marriage as "fuelled by alcohol and cocaine", and claimed "George used coke excessively, and I think it changed him ... it froze his emotions and hardened his heart.")

Author Ian Inglis, discussing Harrison's 1973 song "So Sad", describes Boyd as the musician's "closest companion" and someone who shared in his "triumphs and tragedies". Among these key events, Inglis lists the international Beatlemania phenomenon, the Beatles' decision to retire from live performance, the 1967 Summer of Love, Epstein's death, the creation of Apple Corps, the Beatles' exploration of Indian spirituality, the band's break-up, Harrison's ascendancy as a songwriter and then as a solo artist, and his Bangladesh aid project. The couple's divorce was finalised on 9 June 1977. Boyd's solicitor, Paddy Grafton-Green of the London firm Theodore Goddard, later remarked on the sensitivity shown by each party towards the other, which he found particularly rare in his experience of high-stakes divorces. He said: "There was no overreacting, no greed or playing with each other's emotions – I wish all divorces were so well handled."

=== Marriage to Eric Clapton ===
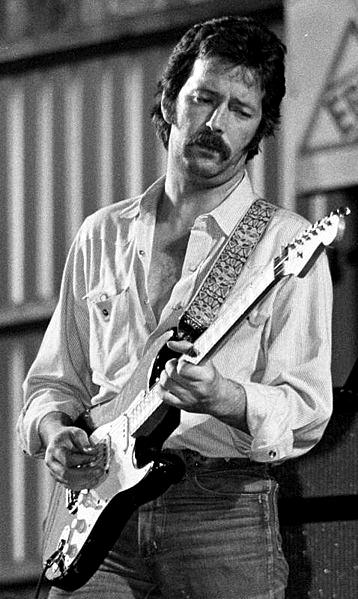
Clapton performing in 1977

In the late 1960s, Eric Clapton and George Harrison became close friends and began writing and recording music together. Clapton fell in love with Boyd at this time. In an effort to satisfy his infatuation, Clapton briefly dated Boyd's sister Paula. His 1970 album with Derek and the Dominos, Layla and Other Assorted Love Songs, was written to proclaim his love for Boyd, particularly the hit song "Layla". Clapton drew inspiration from The Story of Layla and Majnun by Persian writer Nizami; based on a story about the seventh-century Nejdi Bedouin poet Qays ibn Al-Mulawwah and his lover Layla bint Mahdi (or Layla al-Aamiriya), the tale concerns a man driven to madness by his unattainable love. Boyd's initial rebuffing of Clapton and his unrequited love for her eventually led Clapton to descend into heroin addiction and self-imposed exile between 1971 and 1974.

In 1974, Clapton again pursued Boyd. Actor John Hurt later recalled that Harrison and Clapton staged a guitar "duel" over Boyd at Friar Park; Hurt added that it was "extraordinary ... The air was electric. Nobody dare say a word." While Boyd supports this account, Clapton has dismissed its significance. (Note: Clapton says that Hurt was unaware that he and Harrison regularly played together in such a fashion, and Hurt had used his "actor's imagination" to create a "mythical rumour of that night [that] may have passed around a few dining-room tables".) Boyd finally left Harrison on 4 July that year. She and Clapton were married on 27 March 1979 in Tucson, Arizona. They remained close friends with Harrison, who took to calling Clapton his "husband-in-law".

Boyd soon struggled within the marriage and began drinking heavily, but these difficulties were masked by her public image with Clapton. He later admitted to abusing and raping her while they were married and that he was a "full-blown" alcoholic. Clapton and Boyd tried unsuccessfully to have children, trying in vitro fertilisation in 1984 and 1987, but were faced instead with miscarriages.

Boyd left Clapton in April 1987 and divorced him in 1989. Her stated reasons were Clapton's years of alcoholism, as well as his numerous affairs, including one with Italian actress Lory Del Santo. In 1989, her divorce was granted on the grounds of "infidelity and unreasonable behaviour". She subsequently suspected that Clapton's pursuit of her when she was married to Harrison "had more to do" with the competitive aspect of the two musicians' friendship, and that "Eric just wanted what George had."

In 2007, Rolling Stone referred to Boyd as a "legendary rock muse" for her role in inspiring the music of Harrison and Clapton, while Alan Light of The New York Times described the Boyd–Clapton–Harrison love triangle as "one of the most mythical romantic entanglements in rock'n'roll history". Roger Cormier of Mental Floss similarly recognises her as "one of the most important muses in rock and roll history". In addition to "Layla", she was the inspiration for Clapton's love songs "Bell Bottom Blues" and "Wonderful Tonight". He also wrote "Golden Ring" for Boyd, in response to her sadness at learning of Harrison's marriage to Olivia Arias in 1978, and the 1983 track "The Shape You're In", which addressed Boyd's drinking.

=== Marriage to Rod Weston ===
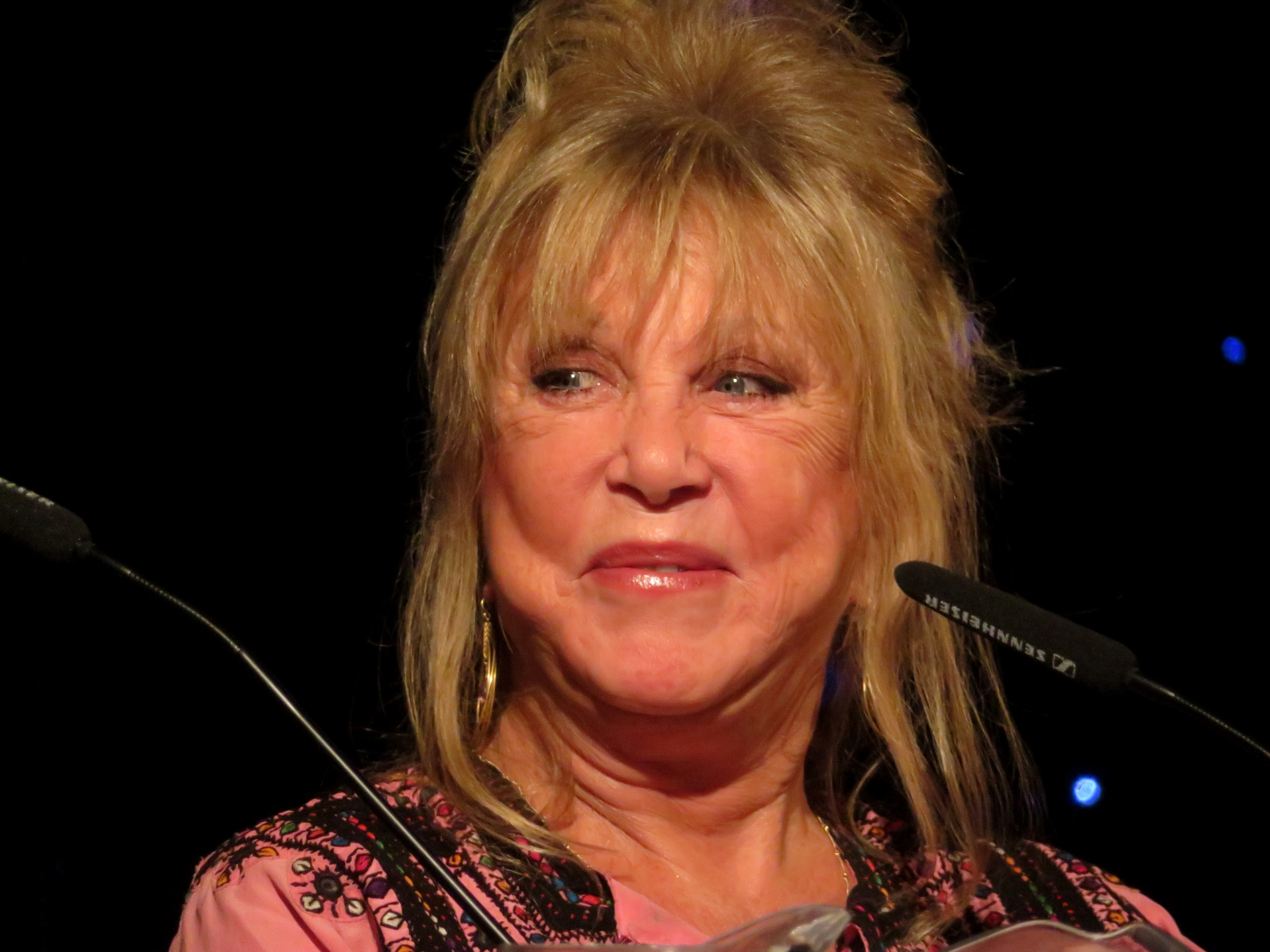
Boyd at the Beatles Convention in Liverpool in 2018

Boyd met property developer Rod Weston in 1991. The couple were married on 29 April 2015 in a ceremony held at the Register Office in Chelsea Old Town Hall, London. Weston was quoted as saying, "It's almost our silver anniversary so we thought we had better get on with it."

=== In popular culture ===
Boyd will be portrayed by actress Aimee Lou Wood in the upcoming The Beatles - A Four-Film Cinematic Event by Sam Mendes. The films are expected to be released in April 2028.

== Autobiography ==
In August 2007, Headline Review published Boyd's autobiography, titled Wonderful Today and co-written with journalist and broadcaster Penny Junor. Re-titled Wonderful Tonight: George Harrison, Eric Clapton, and Me for the US market, the book contains many of Boyd's photographs. Boyd carried out interviews to promote the release. At the time, she was said to be looking forward to the idea of her book competing against Clapton's autobiography, which was published concurrently. Clapton disagreed with some of the details in her account but said, "We each have our different versions of our years together."

Reviewing Wonderful Today for The Daily Telegraph, Lynn Barber described it as "absolutely gripping" and a memoir that "gives more insight into the weirdness of rock-star life than anything I have ever read". In the United States, the book debuted at the top of the New York Times Best Seller list.

== Sources ==
- Badman, Keith (2001). The Beatles Diary Volume 2: After the Break-Up 1970–2001. London: Omnibus Press. ISBN 978-0-7119-8307-6.
- Barrow, Tony (2006). John, Paul, George, Ringo & Me: The Real Beatles Story. Boston, MA: Da Capo Press. ISBN 978-1-56025-882-7.
- Boyd, Pattie; with Junor, Penny (2007). Wonderful Today: The Autobiography. London: Headline Review. ISBN 978-0-7553-1646-5.
- Browne, David (2011). Fire and Rain. Da Capo Press. ISBN 978-0-306-81850-9.
- Clapton, Eric (2007). Eric Clapton: The Autobiography. London: Century. ISBN 978-1-84605-309-2.
- Clayson, Alan (2003). George Harrison. London: Sanctuary. ISBN 1-86074-489-3.
- Davies, Hunter (2009) [1968]. The Beatles (rev. edn). New York, NY: W.W. Norton. ISBN 978-0-393-33874-4.
- Doggett, Peter (2009). You Never Give Me Your Money: The Beatles After the Breakup. HarperCollins. ISBN 978-0-06-177418-8.
- Fletcher, Tony (1998). Dear Boy: The Life of Keith Moon. London: Omnibus Press. ISBN 978-1-84449-807-9.
- Gould, Jonathan (2007). Can't Buy Me Love: The Beatles, Britain and America. London: Piatkus. ISBN 978-0-7499-2988-6.
- Greene, Joshua M. (2006). Here Comes the Sun: The Spiritual and Musical Journey of George Harrison. Hoboken, NJ: John Wiley & Sons. ISBN 978-0-470-12780-3.
- Harry, Bill (2003). The George Harrison Encyclopedia. London: Virgin Books. ISBN 978-0-7535-0822-0.
- Huntley, Elliot (2006) [2004]. Mystical One: George Harrison: After the Break-up of the Beatles. Toronto, ON: Guernica Editions. ISBN 978-1-55071-197-4.
- Inglis, Ian (2010). The Words and Music of George Harrison. Santa Barbara, CA: Praeger. ISBN 978-0-313-37532-3.
- Kruth, John (2015). This Bird Has Flown: The Enduring Beauty of Rubber Soul Fifty Years On. Milwaukee, WI: Backbeat Books. ISBN 978-1-61713-573-6.
- Levy, Shawn (2003). Ready, Steady, Go!: Swinging London and the Invention of Cool. London: Fourth Estate. ISBN 978-1-84115-226-4.
- MacDonald, Ian (1998). Revolution in the Head: The Beatles' Records and the Sixties. London: Pimlico. ISBN 978-0-7126-6697-8.
- Miles, Barry (2001). The Beatles Diary Volume 1: The Beatles Years. London: Omnibus Press. ISBN 0-7119-8308-9.
- Reid, Jan (2006). Layla and Other Assorted Love Songs by Derek and the Dominos. New York, NY: Rodale. ISBN 978-1-59486-369-1.
- Spitz, Bob (2005). The Beatles: The Biography. Little, Brown and Company. ISBN 978-0-316-01331-4.
- Tillery, Gary (2011). Working Class Mystic: A Spiritual Biography of George Harrison. Wheaton, IL: Quest Books. ISBN 978-0-8356-0900-5.
- Turner, Steve (1999). A Hard Day's Write: The Stories Behind Every Beatles Song (2nd edn). New York, NY: Carlton/HarperCollins. ISBN 0-06-273698-1.
- Turner, Steve (2016). Beatles '66: The Revolutionary Year. New York, NY: HarperLuxe. ISBN 978-0-06-249713-0.
