= Thornburgh House =

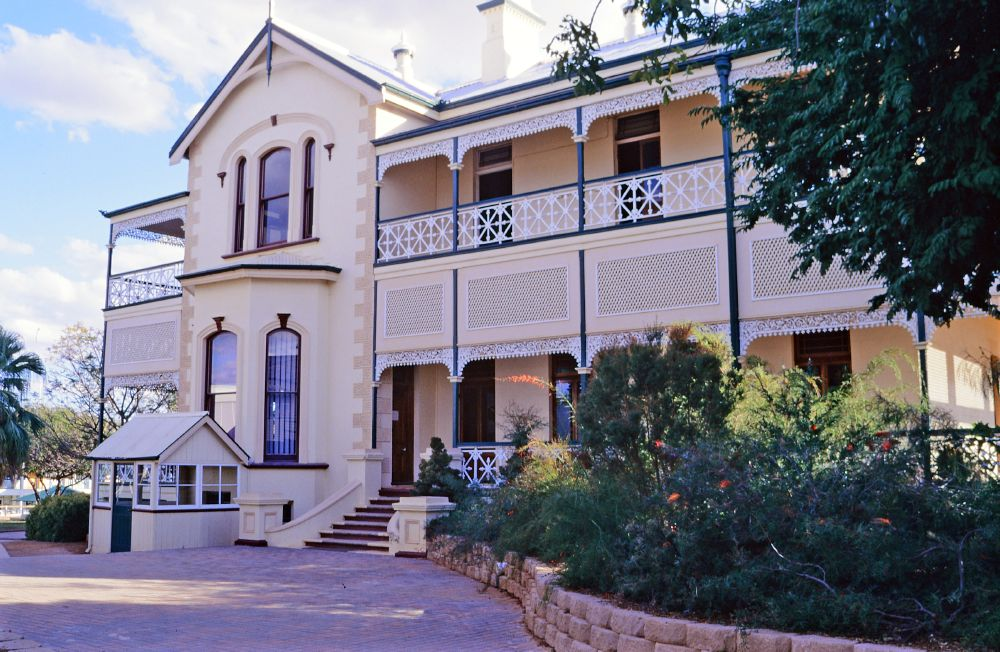
- Thornburgh House, 1997

- Location within Queensland Location within Australia
- 20.0702°S 146.2568°E
- Location: 57–59 King Street, Richmond, Charters Towers, Charters Towers Region, Queensland, Australia

History
- Design period: 1870s–1890s (late 19th century)
- Built: 1889

Queensland Heritage Register
- Official name: Thornburgh House, Thornburgh, Thornburgh College
- Type: state heritage (built)
- Designated: 21 October 1992
- Reference no.: 600405
- Significant period: 1890s (fabric); 1890s–1920s (historical)
- Significant components: service wing, residential accommodation – main house, views to, cellar, basement / sub-floor, views from, rink – skating, dormitory, residential accommodation – servants' quarters

Thornburgh House is a heritage-listed villa at 57–59 King Street, Richmond Hill, Charters Towers, Charters Towers Region, Queensland, Australia. Designed by Tunbridge & Tunbridge, it was built in 1889. It is also known as Thornburgh and Thornburgh College.

It was added to the Queensland Heritage Register on 21 October 1992.

== History ==
Thornburgh House is a two-story brick villa constructed in 1890 for Charters Towers mining magnate Edmund Harris Thornburgh Plant. It became a boarding school in 1919, a function which continues to the present day.

Plant arrived in Australia, aged 17, in 1862 after living briefly in America. He initially worked on a rural property before turning to prospecting in the southern and central mining fields then moving to the newly discovered Ravenswood field in 1869. He took out a mining lease on the productive Black Jack Reef and erected the first ore-crushing battery, the Vulcan Mill, in 1870. Soon after, Plant was amongst the first on the newly discovered Charters Towers field and erected the Venus Mill in 1873. In addition to his successes in Charters Towers and Ravenswood, he also had interests in the Hodgkinson and Palmer fields and in copper, tin and wolfram production in other northern mining areas.

Plant made a major contribution to the development of mining in north Queensland. Charters Towers was a field of astonishing richness and at its peak accounted for more than a third of Queensland's entire gold production as new technologies requiring corporate capital took over from the hand methods of individual miners and small syndicates. Plant not only owned crushing mills, but entered into public affairs in a wide range of areas; as a Member of the Queensland Legislative Assembly and Queensland Legislative Council, as Chairman of the Dalrymple Shire Council and Divisional Board for nine consecutive years, and on a variety of boards ranging from the Townsville Harbour Board to those responsible for the local water supply and hospital.

In the year before construction on Thornburgh began, Plant and his family spent 12 months visiting England; a practice not uncommon for wealthy Australians who wished to collect ideas and furnishings for a projected residence. It is not surprising that when it was finished, Thornburgh was described by the Northern Miner as "the handsomest and most convenient dwelling house in the North". The paper also noted with approval that apart from two mantelpieces brought from England, most of the materials used in the building itself were made in North Queensland. The two storeyed home, located on Plant's Ridge, was not only large, handsome and tastefully decorated, but incorporated some innovative ideas. These included an inner roof of Willesden paper intended to allow air drawn through mesh under the roof to circulate between it and the roof proper thus cooling the building. An unlimited supply of water piped through the house was provided by means of an elevated tank supplied by steam pump from the dam of the Bonnie Dundee Mine which Plant owned and which the house overlooked. Electricity was also supplied.

The basement to the house contained, besides storage space, wine cellar and larder, a children's playroom with a concreted area for them to use as a skating rink.

To the rear was a separate servants' section which contained a kitchen, servant's hall, three bedrooms and a bathroom. Plant also employed a large grounds staff and by 1919 when the house was sold, the extensive gardens and mature trees formed an oasis of greenery in the parched environment of Charters Towers and were an important part of the town landscape.

Although gold production on the field peaked in 1899 at an impressive 337,000 ounces, it soon became clear that these grades did not continue at depth and by 1920 only one mine was still operational. People, businesses and even the more portable buildings, moved away from the town. Property prices fell and the availability of large redundant buildings in a town servicing a wide area and connected to major centres by rail suggested the possibility of schools to several churches. In 1918, as Plant approached retirement and was increasingly involved in his pastoral property near Ingham, he put Thornburgh up for sale.

Representatives of the Methodist and Presbyterian Churches had already met to consider establishing a college for North Queensland students under the auspices of the two churches. They approached Plant about the purchase of Thornburgh, but the Anglican Sisters in Townsville were also interested in the property and so an option was quickly secured by the Reverend Robert Bacon to purchase the house for £3,000 in November 1918. The newly formed school committee placed £50 as a holding deposit.

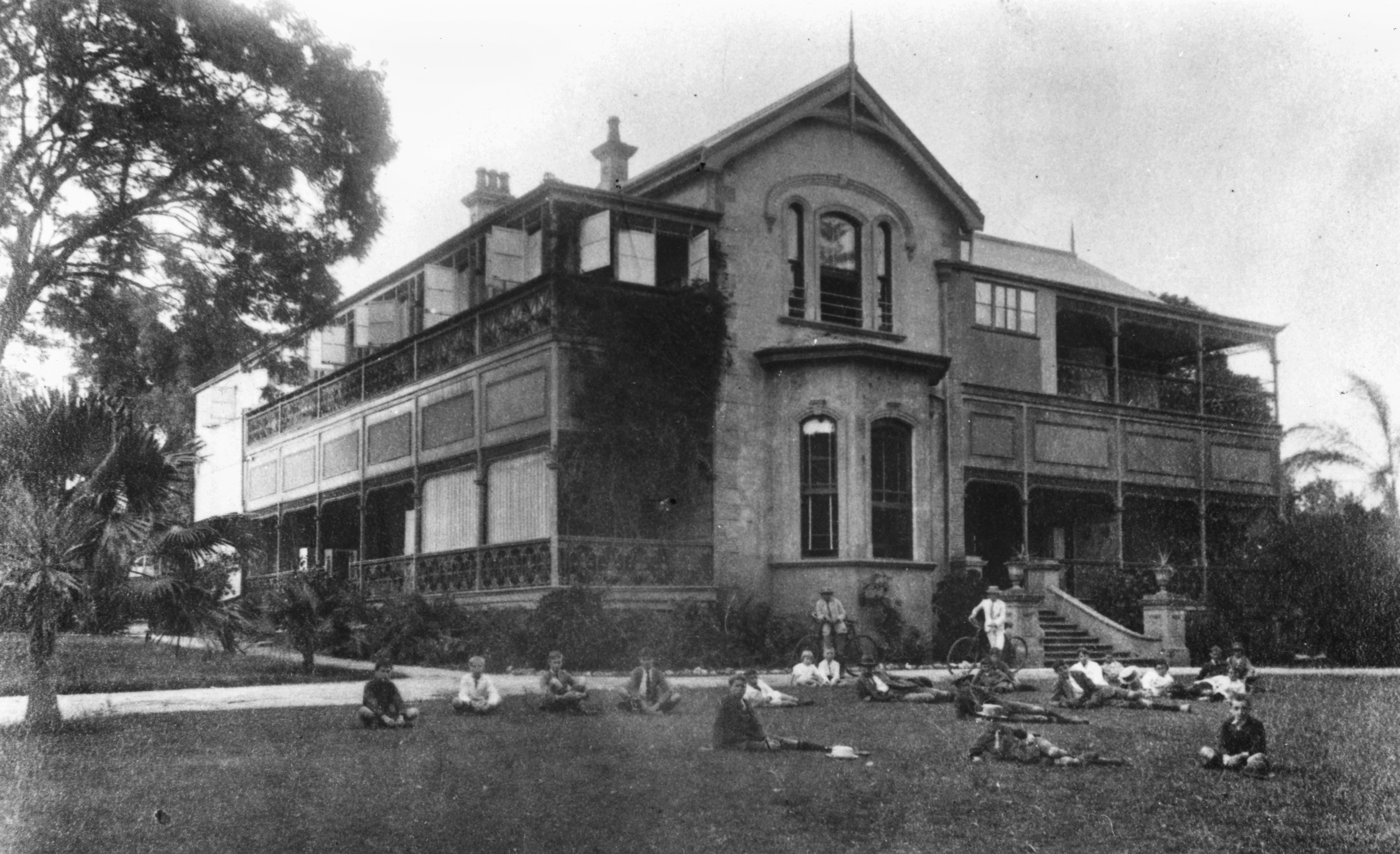
Thornburgh College school and grounds, circa 1920

Thornburgh College, a school for boys, began classes on 16 June 1919 with John Frederick Ward, MA, of Prince Alfred College, Adelaide, as principal. The school was officially opened by Rev Dr Henry Youngman, President General of the Methodist Church of Australia, on 23 April 1920. By the Golden Jubilee Year in 1969, more than 2,500 boys had been educated at the college.

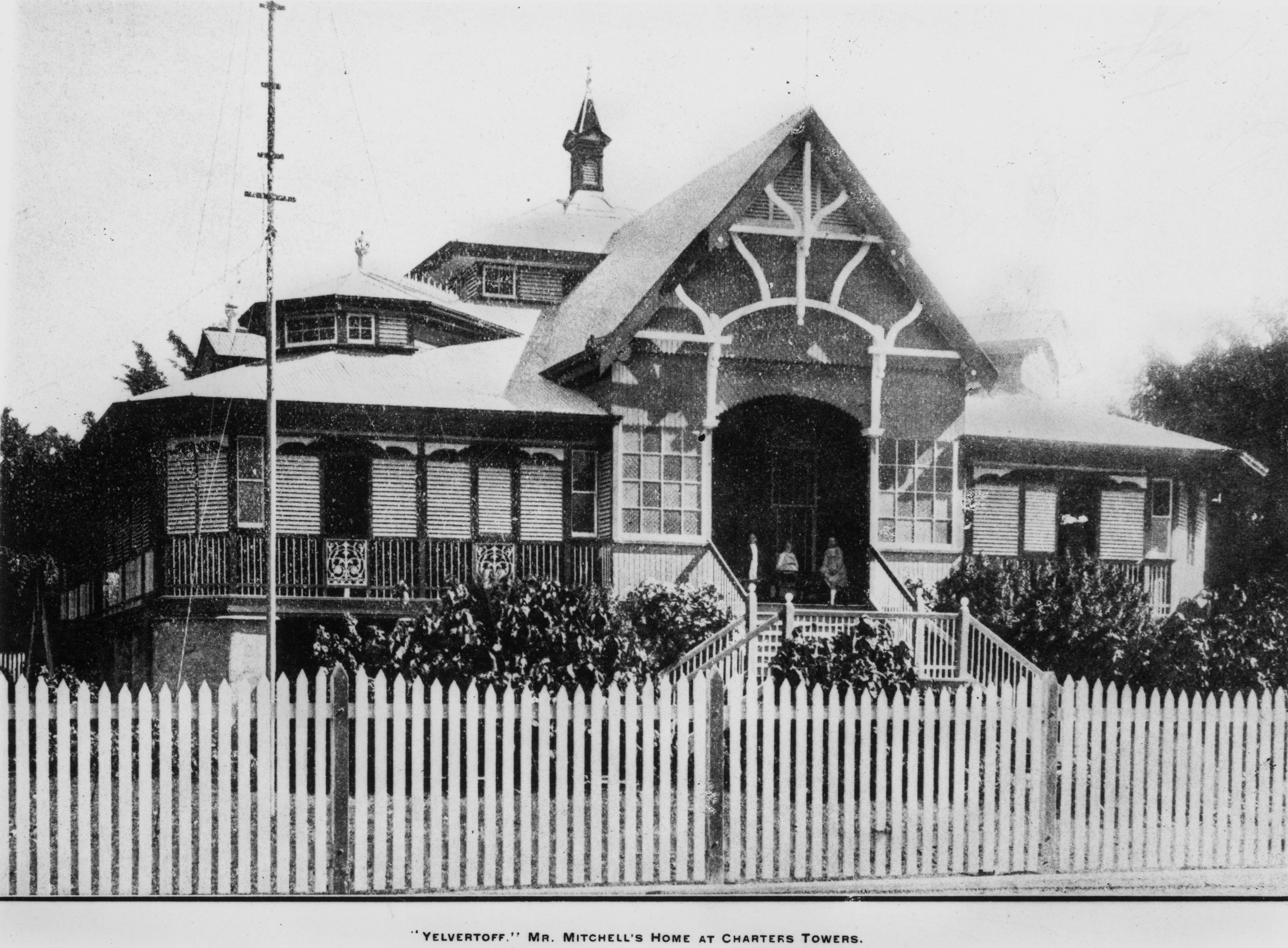
Yelvertoft (later Blackheath College), circa 1917

A gift of £1000 from a Mr William Robert Black and generous contributions from the public made it possible for Rev. Bacon to establish a girls' school in "Yelvertoft", the former home of Mr J Mitchell. The college was opened in 1920 and given the name of Blackheath College as a tribute to Mr Black. Senior girls attended Thornburgh College until January 1921 when Blackheath Principal, Miss J. E. Bullow, began her illustrious eighteen-year career with the college. Blackheath was officially opened on 16 June 1921 by Rev J Cosh, Moderator of the Presbyterian Church of Queensland. The two schools were run by a single College Council although they appear to have had separate administration and financial structures.

Because Thornburgh was locally run, all funds had to be raised through the school and the community. A fundraising campaign was begun on 2 December 1918 by the College Council and secured £50,000 over the next twelve years. In 1919 the College Council was able to purchase the abandoned dam and tailings area below the house, which had been part of Plant's Bonnie Dundee Mill, and by 1922 had developed it into a sports field. In 1920, in order to provide additional dormitories and a new bathroom upstairs and a larger dining room downstairs, some modifications were made. These included extending the verandahs and enclosing the western verandah. In 1923 a new building containing a dining room and dormitory was constructed and the former Thornburgh dining room was converted to classrooms.

Ownership of the school passed to the Presbyterian Assembly and Methodist Conference in 1932 during the Depression when the local College Council found it difficult to keep the school running as student numbers fell. Matters began to improve with the appointment in 1939 of a new principal, T.R. McKenzie. To boost morale and raise the profile of the school in the community, he, his wife and the school staff carried out cleaning, repainting and minor improvements to the college during the 1939–1940 Christmas break. The school building itself was not requisitioned during the War for military use, though an American anti-aircraft battery, machine gun emplacements and communications systems were installed around the margins of the school ovals.

The college experienced another slump during the 1960s and 70s. and the Presbyterian and Methodist Schools Association relinquished financial management of Thornburgh College to a Provisional Board of Governors. On the 5 September 1978 the Board of Governors of Blackheath and Thornburgh College was elected and final control of the college was passed to them on 31 December 1978. The school had become run down and a group of parents and friends undertook to repaint the house in this year. The grounds established by Plant continued to be cared for and enhanced by the college and during the 1940s emphasis was placed on developing the garden. Unfortunately, during the late 1970s and early 1980s, as the college expanded and new buildings were constructed, much of the original gardens were lost.

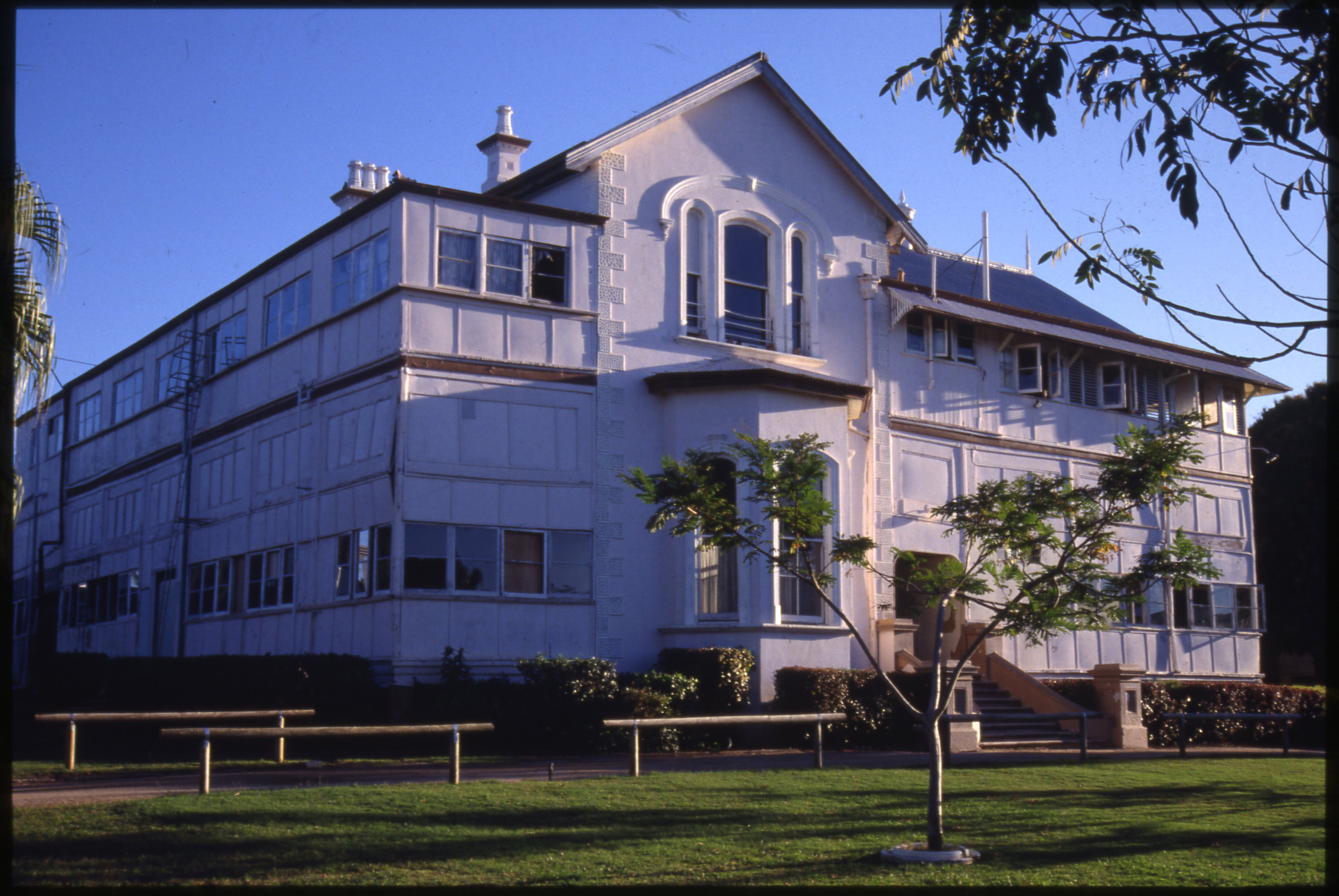
Thornburgh House, before the renovations, 1991

As part of a rationalisation process, the campuses of Blackheath and Thornburgh were combined on the Thornburgh site between 1979 and 1982. A decision was made to demolish Thornburgh House, but was not implemented as it was found that the cost of new buildings would be greater than that of restoring the old. In 1985–1987 classrooms in Thornburgh House were repaired and by 1987 plans were in place to restore the house. During restoration, rooms were provided for past students, for archives and for the school governors. Areas were also set aside for teaching, displays and for the presentation of the performing arts. Work on the building was completed in 1995.

== Description ==
Thornburgh House faces east and is located within the grounds of Blackheath and Thornburgh College close to the main entrance gates on King Street. The house stands on a rise overlooking the school ovals and across the city to the central business district of Charters Towers.

It is a two-storey building of rendered masonry with a roof clad in corrugated iron and deep verandahs to three sides. The verandahs are supported by timber posts, linked by cast iron friezes and cast iron panels in a simple geometric design topped by timber handrails. Between the two storeys are valances of timber lattice within broad timber frames. The ground floor is reached by two sets of concrete steps, that to the main entrance leading into the hall. On the ground floor there are two large rooms with deep bay windows accessed from this hallway and from the verandahs. These were the former dining and drawing rooms and have high plaster ceilings, ornate cornices and imported carved mantelpieces. The main staircase leading from the entrance hall is graceful in form with cast metal balustrades supporting a sinuously curved timber handrail which is constructed of cedar, as is the majority of joinery in the house. French doors lead from almost all rooms onto the wide verandahs and most rooms have fireplaces. There is a second, simple staircase towards the rear of the house which originally linked the former children's school room to bedrooms at the rear of the upper floor. The house also has a basement, which originally housed a children's play room, skating rink and store room.

The former Servants Quarters is a single storey brick building located on slightly more elevated land to the rear of the house. It is divided into six rooms with an awning along the front elevation, creating a shaded verandah.

== Heritage listing ==
Thornburgh House was listed on the Queensland Heritage Register on 21 October 1992 having satisfied the following criteria.

The place is important in demonstrating the evolution or pattern of Queensland's history.

Thornburgh, constructed in 1890 as a home for mining magnate E.H.T. Plant, demonstrates the fluctuations in fortune attendant upon goldfields and the ways in which some depleted fields were able to create new economic lives through different ventures. Charters Towers was an extraordinarily rich goldfield and Thornburgh, as a large and opulent villa, was a product of the towns richest era when many high quality buildings were constructed. As an important boarding school in the north it demonstrates the way in which redundant buildings and the well developed infrastructure of Charters Towers allowed the town to find a new role as an educational centre. It was destroyed in 1967.

The place is important in demonstrating the principal characteristics of a particular class of cultural places.

Although Thornburgh has undergone some modifications for use as a school, it is still a good example of a fashionable villa of its era and was designed by one of North Queensland 's leading architectural firms in Tunbridge & Tunbridge.

The place is important because of its aesthetic significance.

Its aesthetic qualities were much admired when it was new and it is still well liked in both form and detail by the community.

The place has a strong or special association with a particular community or cultural group for social, cultural or spiritual reasons.

Since its inception the college has set high standards and has become one of the leading boarding schools in North Queensland. It has strong connections with the Presbyterian and Methodist Churches, the community of Charters Towers and the very many people who taught or who were educated there.

The place has a special association with the life or work of a particular person, group or organisation of importance in Queensland's history.

Thornburgh House as a home is associated with the life and work of Edmund Plant, an important figure in mining in Charters Towers. As an educational institution, it is particularly associated with the life and works of the Reverend Robert Bacon, who established the school, and the first two principals, Mr J.F. Ward and Miss J.E. Bullow, both endowed with the rare combination of scholastic gifts and organisational ability and to whom the subsequent high reputation of the school owed much.
