= Mavis Gallant =

Canadian writer (1922–2014)

- Born: Mavis Leslie de Trafford Young; 11 August 1922; Montreal, Quebec, Canada
- Died: 18 February 2014 (aged 91); Paris, France
- Spouse: John Gallant (m. 1942–1947)
- Writing career
- Notable works: From the Fifteenth District, The Pegnitz Junction, Home Truths
- Notable awards: Order of Canada; Governor General's Award for English-language fiction Prix Athanase-David

Mavis Leslie de Trafford Gallant, CC (née Young; 11 August 1922 – 18 February 2014), was a Canadian writer who spent much of her life and career in France. Best known as a short story writer, she also published novels, plays and essays.

== Personal life ==
Gallant was born in Montreal, Quebec, the only child of Albert Stewart Roy de Trafford Young, a Canadian furniture salesman and painter who was the son of an officer in the British Army, and his wife, Benedictine Wiseman. Young died in 1932 of kidney disease while Gallant was away at boarding school, but she was told her father had gone on a trip to England. His widow soon remarried and moved to New York, leaving their daughter behind with a guardian. Gallant did not learn of her father's death for several years and later told The New York Times: "I had a mother who should not have had children, and it's as simple as that."

Gallant was educated at seventeen public, private, and convent schools in the United States and Canada. She spent most of the years 1935–1940 in and around New York City, the setting for many of her earlier stories.

She married John Gallant, a Winnipeg musician, in 1942. The couple divorced in 1947. According to Gallant's biographer, the marriage was "briefer than the dates suggest since her husband was in the armed forces overseas for much of the time".

== Career ==
In her 20s, Gallant briefly worked for the National Film Board before taking a job as a reporter for the Montreal Standard (1944–1950). While working for the Standard, she published some of her early short stories, both in the newspaper and in the magazines Preview and Northern Review.

Gallant left journalism in 1950 to pursue fiction writing full-time. She moved to Europe with the hope of being able to work exclusively as a writer rather than supporting herself with other work, and lived briefly in Spain before settling in Paris, France, where she resided for the remainder of her life. Despite residing in Paris, Gallant never surrendered her Canadian citizenship or applied for French citizenship.

Her first internationally published short story, "Madeline's Birthday", appeared in the September 1, 1951 issue of The New Yorker. The magazine soon published other stories of hers, including "One Morning in June" and "The Picnic". She did not initially know these later stories had been accepted by the magazine, as her literary agent, Jacques Chambrun, pocketed her $1,535 in royalties and told her the magazine had declined her stories, while simultaneously lying about her residence to the magazine so they could not contact her directly; she discovered that she had been published only upon seeing her name in the magazine while reading it in a library, and thus established her longstanding relationship with the magazine by directly contacting and befriending New Yorker fiction editor William Maxwell. Chambrun had also embezzled money from W. Somerset Maugham, Ben Hecht, Grace Metalious, and Jack Schaefer, among others.

She published 116 stories in The New Yorker throughout her career, putting her in the same league as John Cheever or John Updike. Alongside Alice Munro, Gallant is one of only a few Canadian authors whose works have regularly appeared in the magazine.

She wrote two novels, Green Water, Green Sky (1959) and A Fairly Good Time (1970); a play, What Is to Be Done? (1984); numerous celebrated collections of stories, The Other Paris (1956), My Heart Is Broken (1964), The Pegnitz Junction (1973), The End of the World and Other Stories (1974), From the Fifteenth District (1979), Home Truths: Selected Canadian Stories (1981), Overhead in a Balloon: Stories of Paris (1985), In Transit (1988) and Across the Bridge (1993); and a non-fiction work, Paris Notebooks: Selected Essays and Reviews (1986). Numerous new collections of stories from the earlier books, including The Selected Stories of Mavis Gallant (1996), Paris Stories (2002) and Varieties of Exile (2003), were also released in the 1990s and 2000s. The Cost of Living (2009) collected stories from throughout her career, which had been published in literary magazines but not in earlier collections. Her "Linnet Muir" series of stories, which appeared in several of her books before being collected in their entirety in Home Truths, are her most explicitly semi-autobiographical works.

Throughout Gallant's early career, Canadian literary critics often wrote of her as being unfairly overlooked in Canada because of her expatriate status; prior to the 1970s, in fact, her books were not picked up by Canadian publishers at all, and were available only as rare and expensive American imports until Macmillan of Canada bought publication rights to From the Fifteenth District. According to journalist Robert Fulford, the neglect flowed in both directions, as Gallant did not actually undertake any serious effort to secure a Canadian publisher until Macmillan editor Douglas Gibson approached her in the late 1970s. The Canadian publication of From the Fifteenth District did not initially quell the criticism, however, as the book failed to garner a shortlisted nomination for the Governor General's Award for English-language fiction despite being widely regarded as her greatest work. In response, Gibson compiled Home Truths: Selected Canadian Stories, a collection of previously published stories selected to highlight the Canadian themes and settings present in her work. That volume won the Governor General's Award for English-language fiction in 1981.

She only rarely granted interviews until 2006, when she participated in two television documentaries: one in English for Bravo! Canada, Paris Stories: The Writing of Mavis Gallant, and one in French as part of the series CONTACT, l'encyclopédie de la création, hosted by Canadian broadcaster Stéphan Bureau. Gallant was honoured at Symphony Space in New York City on November 1, 2006, in an event for Selected Shorts—fellow authors Russell Banks, Jhumpa Lahiri and Michael Ondaatje honoured her and read excerpts from her work, and Gallant herself made a rare personal appearance, reading one of her short stories in its entirety.

Gallant's private journals were slated for publication by McClelland and Stewart and Knopf, with the first volume covering the period from 1952 to 1969, but as of 2023 have yet to appear. Some excerpts from the diaries were published by The New Yorker in 2001, 2012, and 2022.

Gallant was candid about her desire for autonomy and privacy. In an interview with Geoff Hancock in Canadian Fiction magazine in 1978, she discussed her "life project" and her deliberate move to France to write by saying, "I have arranged matters so that I would be free to write. It's what I like doing." In the preface to her collection Home Truths: Selected Canadian Stories (1981), she used the words of Boris Pasternak as her epigraph: "Only personal independence matters."

== Death ==
Gallant died, aged 91, on February 18, 2014.

== Critical assessment ==
Grazia Merler observes in her book, Mavis Gallant: Narrative Patterns and Devices, that "Psychological character development is not the heart of Mavis Gallant's stories, nor is plot. Specific situation development and reconstruction of the state of mind or of heart is, however, the main objective." Frequently, Gallant's stories focus on expatriate men and women who have come to feel lost or isolated; marriages that have grown flimsy or shabby; lives that have faltered and now hover in the shadowy area between illusion, self-delusion, and reality. Because of her heritage and understanding of Acadian history, she is often compared to Antonine Maillet, considered to be a spokesperson for Acadian culture in Canada.

In her critical book Reading Mavis Gallant, Janice Kulyk Keefer says: "Gallant is a writer who dazzles us with her command of the language, her innovative use of narrative forms, the acuity of her intelligence, and the incisiveness of her wit. Yet she also disconcerts us with her insistence on the constrictions and limitations that dominate human experience."

In a review of her work in Books in Canada in 1978, Geoff Hancock asserts that "Mavis Gallant's fiction is among the finest ever written by a Canadian. But, like buried treasure, both the author and her writing are to discover." In the Canadian Reader, Robert Fulford writes: "One begins comparing her best moments to those of major figures in literary history. Names like Henry James, Chekhov, and George Eliot dance across the mind."

=== Depiction of fascism ===
Fascism is a recurring subject in Gallant's stories. She once described her 1973 collection The Pegnitz Junction as "a book about where fascism came from . . . not the historical causes of Fascism—just its small possibilities in people." Critics have also singled out Gallant's later story "Speck's Idea" (1979) as offering a sustained engagement with the psychological appeal of fascism. The story, which is Gallant's most widely anthologized work and has been called "arguably her masterpiece," depicts an art dealer in 1970s France who seems to slowly embrace fascism. At the same time, there are details in the story that seem to undermine his association with fascist ideology.

According to critic Andy Lamey, the protagonist of "Speck's Idea" should indeed be viewed as a fascist, "but of a particular, non-ideological type." In the 1970s, France was undergoing a debate about the country's collaboration with its Nazi occupiers during World War II. Lamey offers historical material to suggest that Gallant's story is informed by this debate. He characterizes "Speck's Idea" as a "dramatization of how a segment of the French population, which its central character represents, could tolerate and condone fascism for reasons other than a deep attraction to fascist ideas. These reasons include indifference and self-interest. Gallant's protagonist ultimately illustrates how fascism drew not merely on ideological, but also on opportunistic, motivations."

== Awards and honours ==
In 1981, Gallant was named an Officer of the Order of Canada for her contribution to literature. She was promoted to Companion of the Order in 1993.

In 1983–1984, she returned to Canada to be the writer-in-residence at the University of Toronto. In 1989, Gallant was made a Foreign Honorary Member of the American Academy of Arts and Letters. Queen's University awarded her an honorary LL.D. in 1991, and the Quebec Writers' Federation Awards committee has named its annual non-fiction literary award in her honour. She served on the jury of the Giller Prize in 1997.

In 2000, Gallant won the Matt Cohen Prize, and in 2002 she received the Rea Award for the Short Story. The O. Henry Prize Stories of 2003 was dedicated to her. In 2004, Gallant was awarded a Lannan Literary Fellowship as well as a PEN/Nabokov Award.

On November 8, 2006, Gallant received the Prix Athanase-David from the government of her native province of Quebec. She was the first author writing in English to receive this award in its 38 years of existence.

== In popular culture ==
In 2018, the Pakistani-American author Sadia Shepard was accused of having copied Gallant's short story "The Ice Wagon Going Down the Street" in her story "Foreign-Returned".

Director Wes Anderson based one of the stories in his 2021 film The French Dispatch on "The Events in May: A Paris Notebook", a two-part New Yorker story written by Gallant. A fictional reporter inspired by Gallant was portrayed in the film by actress Frances McDormand.

== Bibliography ==
=== Novellas and short stories ===
- The Other Paris (Houghton Mifflin, 1956).
- My Heart Is Broken: Eight Stories and a Short Novel (Random House, 1964).
- An Unmarried Man's Summer: Eight stories and a Short Novel (Heinemann, 1965).
- The Pegnitz Junction: A Novella and Five Short Stories (1973, ISBN 9780915308606)
- The End of the World and Other Stories (1974, ISBN 9780771091919)
- From the Fifteenth District: A Novella and Eight Short Stories (1979, ISBN 9780771032936)
- Home Truths: Selected Canadian Stories (1981, ISBN 9780771032929)
- Overhead in a Balloon: Stories of Paris (1985, ISBN 9780571154098)
- In Transit: Twenty Stories (1988, ISBN 9780140109177)
- Across the Bridge: Stories (1993, ISBN 9780786701438)

=== Compilations ===
- The Moslem Wife and Other Stories (1994, ISBN 9780771098918)
- The Collected Stories of Mavis Gallant (1996, Random House, ISBN 9780679448860)
- The Selected Stories of Mavis Gallant (1996, McClelland & Stewart, ISBN 9780771033087)
- Paris Stories (2002, New York Review Books, ISBN 9781590170229)
- Varieties of Exile (2003, New York Review Books, ISBN 9781590170601)
- Montreal Stories (2004, McClelland & Stewart, ISBN 9780771032776)
- Going Ashore: Stories (2009, McClelland & Stewart, ISBN 9780771035388). 31 previously uncollected stories.
- The Cost of Living: Early and Uncollected Stories (2009, New York Review Books, ISBN 9781590173275). 19 stories from Going Ashore, and an additional story, "Rose".
- The Uncollected Stories of Mavis Gallant (2024, New York Review Books, ISBN 9781681378749)
- The Latecomehomer: Essential Stories by Mavis Gallant (2025, Pushkin Press, ISBN 9781805332299)

=== Novels ===
- Green Water, Green Sky (Houghton Mifflin, 1959).
- A Fairly Good Time (Random House, 1970).

=== Plays ===
- What Is to Be Done?, 1983 (ISBN 9780864950314)

=== Non-fiction ===
- Paris Notebooks: Essays and Reviews, 1986, Macmillan of Canada (ISBN 9780771596100)
- The Journals of Mavis Gallant: 1952-1968, 2017, Bloomsbury, (ISBN 9781408844014)
- Montreal Standard Time: The Early Journalism of Mavis Gallant, 2024, Vehicule Press, (ISBN 9781550656701)

=== Stories ===
All stories published in The New Yorker except as noted.

Title	Publication	Collected in
"Good Morning and Goodbye"	Preview (December 1944)	-
"Three Brick Walls"	Preview (December 1944)	-
"A Wonderful Country"	Montreal Standard (December 14, 1946)	-
"The Flowers of Spring"	Northern Review (June–July 1950)	-
"Madeline’s Birthday"	September 1, 1951	Going Ashore
"One Morning in May" a.k.a. "One Morning in June"	June 7, 1952	The Other Paris
"The Picnic"	August 9, 1952	The Other Paris; The End of the World and Other Stories
"The Deceptions of Marie-Blanche"	Charm (March 1953)	The Other Paris
"The Other Paris"	April 11, 1953	The Other Paris; The End of the World and Other Stories
"Señor Pinedo"	January 9, 1954	The Other Paris
"Wing's Chips"	April 17, 1954	The Other Paris
"The Legacy"	June 26, 1954	The Other Paris
"By the Sea"	July 17, 1954	In Transit
"Poor Franzi"	Harper's Bazaar (October 1954)	The Other Paris
"Going Ashore"	December 18, 1954	The Other Paris
"About Geneva"	Charm (June 1955)	The Other Paris; The End of the World and Other Stories
"Autumn Day"	October 29, 1955	The Other Paris
"A Day Like Any Other"	?	The Other Paris
"In Italy"	February 25, 1956	In Transit
"Thank You For the Lovely Tea"	June 9, 1956	Home Truths
"Thieves and Rascals"	Esquire (July 1956)	Going Ashore
"Bernadette"	January 12, 1957	My Heart Is Broken
"An Emergency Case"	February 16, 1957	In Transit
"A Short Love Story"	Montrealer (June 1957)	-
"Jeux d'Ete"	July 27, 1957	In Transit
"The Moabitess"	November 2, 1957	My Heart Is Broken
"The Old Place"	Texas Quarterly 1.2 (Spring 1958)	The Uncollected Stories of Mavis Gallant
"Green Water, Green Sky"*	June 27, 1959	* Excerpt from Green Water, Green Sky
"Travellers Must Be Content"*	July 11, 1959	* Excerpt from Green Water, Green Sky
"August"*	August 29, 1959	* Excerpt from Green Water, Green Sky
"Jorinda and Jorindel"	September 19, 1959	Home Truths
"Up North"	November 21, 1959	Home Truths
"Acceptance of Their Ways"	January 30, 1960	My Heart Is Broken; The End of the World and Other Stories
"When We Were Nearly Young"	October 15, 1960	In Transit
"Crossing France"	The Critic (December 1960-January 1961)	The Uncollected Stories of Mavis Gallant
"Better Times"	December 3, 1960	In Transit
"Rose"	December 17, 1960	The Cost of Living: Early and Uncollected Stories
"A Question of Disposal" a.k.a. "Two Questions"	June 10, 1961	In Transit
"My Heart Is Broken"	August 12, 1961	My Heart Is Broken
"The Cost of Living"	March 3, 1962	My Heart Is Broken
"Night and Day"	March 17, 1962	Going Ashore
"One Aspect of a Rainy Day"	April 14, 1962	Going Ashore
"The Hunter's Waking Thoughts"	September 29, 1962	In Transit
"Sunday Afternoon"	November 24, 1962	My Heart Is Broken
"Willi"	January 5, 1963	Going Ashore
"Careless Talk"	September 28, 1963	In Transit
"An Unmarried Man's Summer"	October 12, 1963	My Heart Is Broken; The End of the World and Other Stories
"Ernst in Civilian Clothes"	November 16, 1963	The Pegnitz Junction
"The Ice Wagon Going Down the Street"	December 14, 1963	My Heart Is Broken; Home Truths
"The Image on the Mirror"	-	My Heart Is Broken
"An Autobiography"	February 1, 1964	The Pegnitz Junction
"The Circus"	June 20, 1964	In Transit
"Paola and Renata"	The Southern Review (January 1965)	Going Ashore
"Virus X"	January 30, 1965	Home Truths
"Orphans' Progress"	April 3, 1965	Home Truths
"In Transit"	August 6, 1965	In Transit
"The Statues Taken Down"	October 9, 1965	In Transit
"Questions and Answers"	May 28, 1966	In Transit
"Vacances Pax"	July 16, 1966	In Transit
"Bonaventure"	July 30, 1966	Home Truths
"A Report"	December 3, 1966	In Transit
"The End of the World"	June 10, 1967	The End of the World and Other Stories
"The Accident"	October 28, 1967	The End of the World and Other Stories
"The Sunday After Christmas"	December 30, 1967	In Transit
"April Fish"	February 10, 1968	In Transit
"Malcolm and Bea"	March 23, 1968	The End of the World and Other Stories
"Saturday"	June 8, 1968	Home Truths
"The Captive Niece"	January 4, 1969	In Transit
"Good Deed"	February 22, 1969	In Transit
"The Rejection"	April 12, 1969	Going Ashore
"The Prodigal Parent"	June 7, 1969	The End of the World and Other Stories; Home Truths
"The Wedding Ring"	June 28, 1969	The End of the World and Other Stories
"The Old Friends"	August 30, 1969	The Pegnitz Junction
"New Year's Eve"	January 10, 1970	The End of the World and Other Stories
"In the Tunnel"	September 18, 1971	The End of the World and Other Stories; Home Truths
"O Lasting Peace"	January 8, 1972	The Pegnitz Junction
"An Alien Flower"	October 7, 1972	The Pegnitz Junction
"The Pegnitz Junction"	-	The Pegnitz Junction
"His Mother"	August 13, 1973	From the Fifteenth District
"The Latehomecomer"	July 8, 1974	From the Fifteenth District
"Irina"	December 2, 1974	From the Fifteenth District
"The Four Seasons"	June 16, 1975	From the Fifteenth District
"In Youth Is Pleasure"	November 24, 1975	Home Truths
"Between Zero and One"	December 8, 1975	Home Truths
"Varieties of Exile"	January 19, 1976	Home Truths
"Voices Lost in Snow"	April 5, 1976	Home Truths
"The Moslem Wife"	August 23, 1976	From the Fifteenth District
"Potter"	March 21, 1977	From the Fifteenth District
"The Doctor"	June 20, 1977	Home Truths
"With a Capital T"	Canadian Fiction (Spring 1978)	Home Truths
"From the Fifteenth District"	October 30, 1978	From the Fifteenth District
"The Burgundy Weekend"	Tamarack Review (Winter 1979)	Going Ashore
"Baum, Gabriel, 1935-( )"	February 12, 1979	From the Fifteenth District
"The Remission"	August 13, 1979	From the Fifteenth District
"Speck's Idea"	November 19, 1979	Overhead in a Balloon
"A Revised Guide to Paris"	February 11, 1980	Going Ashore
"From Sunrise to Daybreak"	March 17, 1980	-
"The Assembly"	Harper's Magazine (May 1980)	Overhead in a Balloon
"Dido Flute, Spouse to Europe"	May 12, 1980	"Going Ashore"
"From Gamut to Yalta"	September 15, 1980	"Going Ashore"
"Europe by Satellite"	November 3, 1980	-
"Mousse"	December 22, 1980	Going Ashore
"French Crenellation"	February 9, 1981	Going Ashore
"A Painful Affair"	March 16, 1981	Overhead in a Balloon
"This Space"	July 6, 1981	-
"On With the New in France"	August 10, 1981	Going Ashore
"La Vie Parisienne"	October 19, 1981	Going Ashore
"Larry"	November 16, 1981	Overhead in a Balloon
"Siegfried's Memoirs"	April 5, 1982	Going Ashore
"Treading Water"	May 24, 1982	Going Ashore
"A Flying Start"	September 13, 1982	Overhead in a Balloon
"Luc and His Father"	October 4, 1982	Overhead in a Balloon
"Grippes and Poche"	November 29, 1982	Overhead in a Balloon
"A Recollection"	August 22, 1983	Overhead in a Balloon
"Rue de Lille"	September 19, 1983	Overhead in a Balloon
"The Colonel's Child"	October 10, 1983	Overhead in a Balloon
"Lena"	October 31, 1983	Overhead in a Balloon
"Overhead in a Balloon"	July 2, 1984	Overhead in a Balloon
"The Chosen Husband"	April 15, 1985	Across the Bridge
"From Cloud to Cloud"	July 8, 1985	Across the Bridge
"Florida"	August 26, 1985	Across the Bridge
"Leaving the Party"	March 3, 1986	-
"Kingdom Come"	September 8, 1986	Across the Bridge
"Dede"	January 5, 1987	Across the Bridge
"1933" a.k.a. "Declassé"	Mademoiselle (February 1987)	Across the Bridge
"Let It Pass"	May 18, 1987	-
"The Concert Party"	January 28, 1988	-
"In a War"	October 30, 1989	-
"Across the Bridge"	March 18, 1991	Across the Bridge
"Forain"	June 24, 1991	Across the Bridge
"A State of Affairs"	December 23, 1991	Across the Bridge
"Mlle. Dias de Corta"	December 28, 1992 & January 4, 1993	Across the Bridge
"The Fenton Child"	-	Across the Bridge
"In Plain Sight"	October 25, 1993	The Collected Stories of Mavis Gallant
"Scarves, Beads, Sandals"	February 20 & 27, 1995	The Collected Stories of Mavis Gallant
