= Blackheath and Thornburgh College =

Coordinates: 20.0703°S 146.2568°E

Blackheath and Thornburgh College is a primary and secondary (K-12) school with boarding facilities at 55 King Street, Richmond Hill, Charters Towers, Charters Towers Region, Queensland, Australia.

== History ==
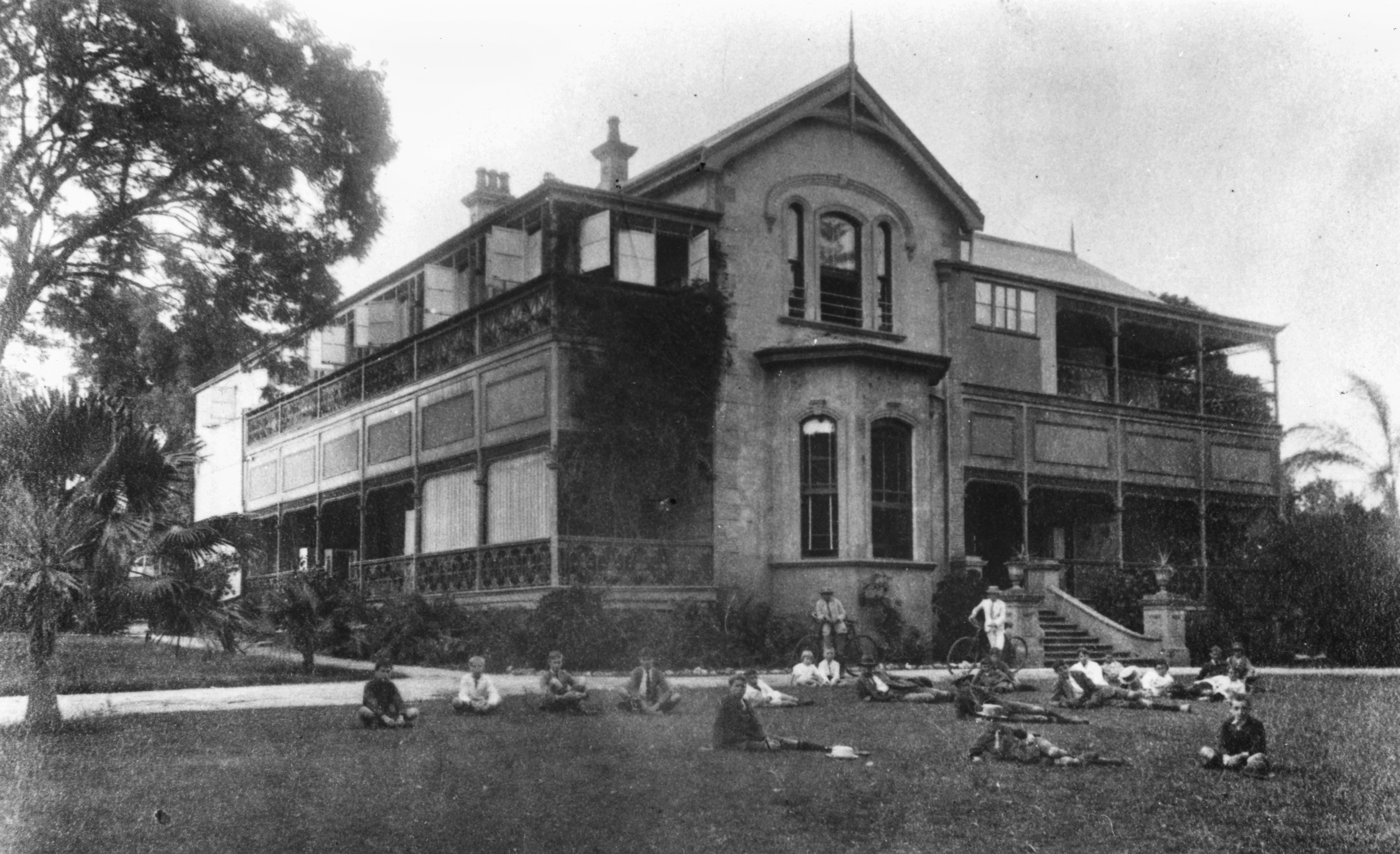
Thornburgh College school and grounds, circa 1920

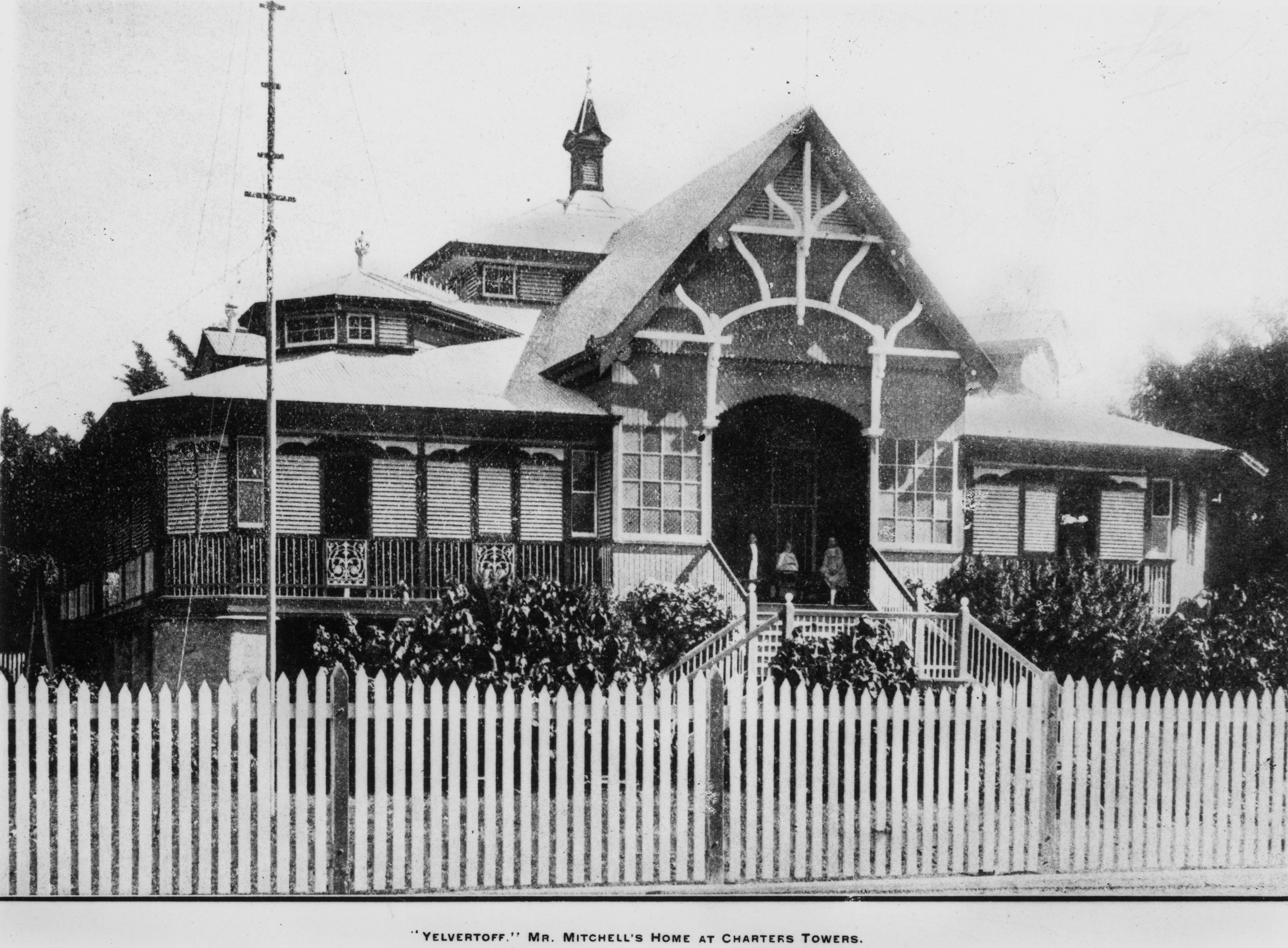
Yelvertoft (later Blackheath College), circa 1917

By 1918, representatives of the Methodist and Presbyterian Churches had already met to consider establishing a college for North Queensland students under the auspices of the two churches. In 1918, Charters Towers mining magnate Edmund Harris Thornburgh Plant wanted to sell his mansion, Thornburgh House, with its extensive gardens and mature trees which formed an oasis of greenery in the parched environment of Charters Towers. So the church representatives approached Plant about the purchase of Thornburgh, but on hearing the Anglican Sisters in Townsville were also interested in the property, the Presbyterian and Methodist church representative Robert Bacon quickly secured an option to purchase the house for £3,000 in November 1918. The newly formed school committee placed £50 as a holding deposit.

Thornburgh College, a school for boys, began classes on 16 June 1919 with John Frederick Ward, MA, of Prince Alfred College, Adelaide, as Principal. The school was officially opened by Dr Henry Youngman, President General of the Methodist Church of Australia, on 23 April 1920. By the Golden Jubilee Year in 1969, more than 2,500 boys had been educated at the college.

A gift of £1000 from a William Robert Black and generous contributions from the public made it possible for Bacon to establish a girls' school in "Yelvertoft", the former home of J Mitchell. The college was opened in 1920 and given the name of Blackheath College as a tribute to Black. Senior girls attended Thornburgh College until January 1921 when Blackheath Principal, Miss J. E. Bullow, began her illustrious eighteen-year career with the College. Blackheath was officially opened on 16 June 1921 by J Cosh, Moderator of the Presbyterian Church of Queensland. The two schools were run by a single College Council although they appear to have had separate administration and financial structures.

Because Thornburgh was locally run, all funds had to be raised through the school and the community. A fundraising campaign was begun on 2 December 1918 by the College Council and secured £50,000 over the next twelve years. In 1919 the College Council was able to purchase the abandoned dam and tailings area below the house, which had been part of Plant's Bonnie Dundee Mill, and by 1922 had developed it into a sports field. In 1920, in order to provide additional dormitories and a new bathroom upstairs and a larger dining room downstairs, some modifications were made. These included extending the verandahs and enclosing the western verandah. In 1923 a new building containing a dining room and dormitory was constructed and the former Thornburgh dining room was converted to classrooms.

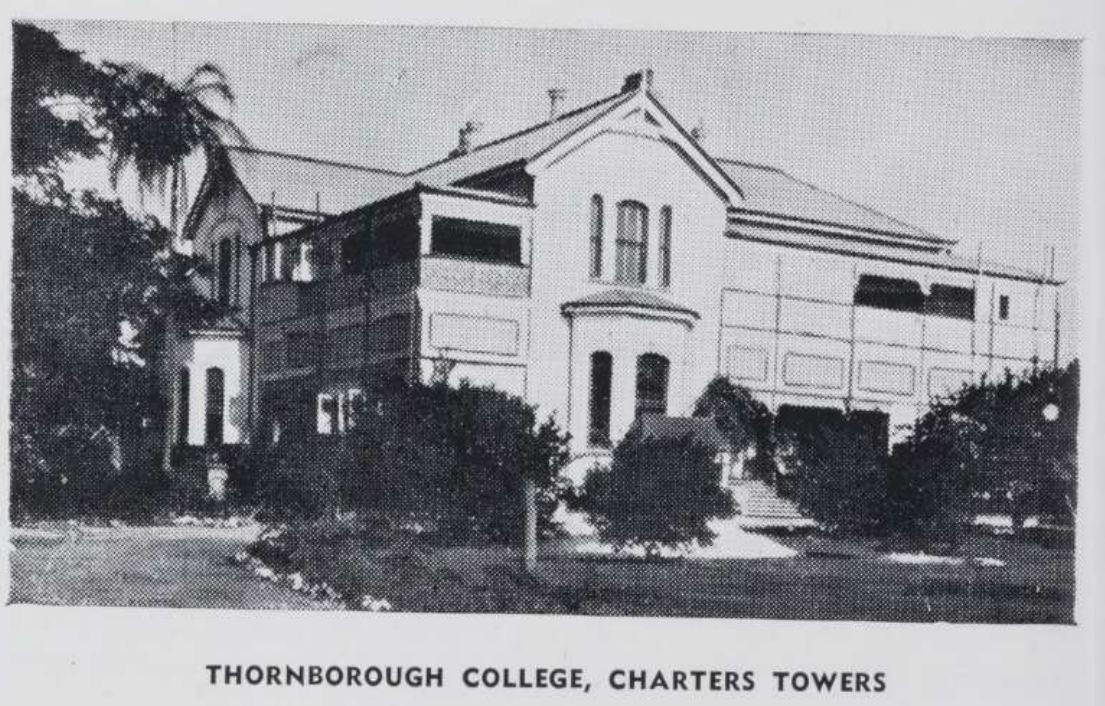
Thornburgh College, circa 1947

Ownership of the School passed to the Presbyterian Assembly and Methodist Conference in 1932 during the Depression when the local College Council found it difficult to keep the school running as student numbers fell. Matters began to improve with the appointment in 1939 of a new Principal, T.R. McKenzie. To boost morale and raise the profile of the school in the community, he, his wife and the school staff carried out cleaning, repainting and minor improvements to the college during the 1939–1940 Christmas break. The school building itself was not requisitioned during the War for military use, though an American anti-aircraft battery, machine gun emplacements and communications systems were installed around the margins of the school ovals.

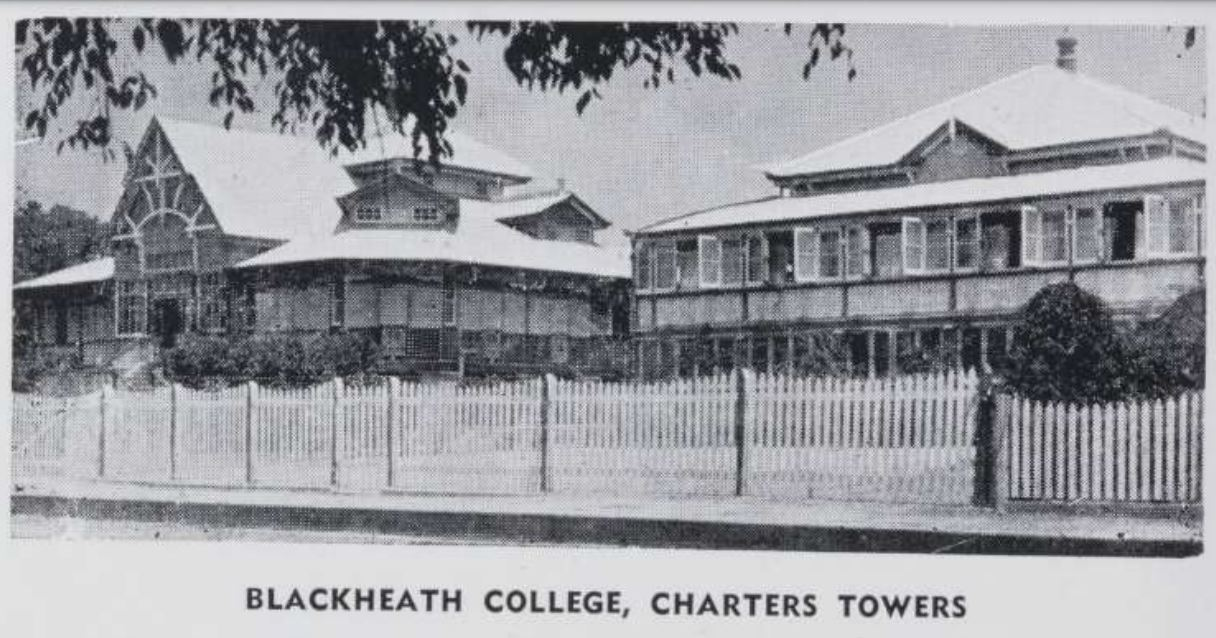
Blackheath College, circa 1947

The College experienced another slump during the 1960s and 1970s. and the Presbyterian and Methodist Schools Association relinquished financial management of Thornburgh College to a Provisional Board of Governors. On the 5 September 1978 the Board of Governors of Blackheath and Thornburgh College was elected and final control of the College was passed to them on 31 December 1978. The school had become run down and a group of parents and friends undertook to repaint the house in this year. The grounds established by Plant continued to be cared for and enhanced by the College and during the 1940s emphasis was placed on developing the garden. Unfortunately, during the late 1970s and early 1980s, as the College expanded and new buildings were constructed, much of the original gardens were lost.

As part of a rationalisation process, the campuses of Blackheath and Thornburgh were combined on the Thornburgh site between 1979 and 1982. A decision was made to demolish Thornburgh House, but was not implemented as it was found that the cost of new buildings would be greater than that of restoring the old. In 1985–1987 classrooms in Thornburgh House were repaired and by 1987 plans were in place to restore the house. During restoration, rooms were provided for past students, for archives and for the school governors. Areas were also set aside for teaching, displays and for the presentation of the performing arts. Work on the building was completed in 1995.

Thornburgh House was listed on the Queensland Heritage Register on 21 October 1992.

== Notable alumni ==
- Nathan Fien, Australian professional rugby league player
- William Graham Henderson Maxwell, Australia geologist researching the Great Barrier Reef
- Zac Santo, Australian professional rugby league footballer
