= Penny Junor =

English journalist and author

- Born: Penelope Jane Junor; 6 October 1949 (age 76); Leatherhead, Surrey, England
- Occupations: Journalist, royal biographer, author
- Years active: 1981–present
- Spouse: James Leith (m. 1970)
- Children: 4, including Sam Leith
- Father: Sir John Junor

Penelope Jane Junor (/ˈdʒunər/; born 6 October 1949) is an English journalist and author.

== Early life and education ==
Born in Leatherhead, Surrey, Junor was educated at Benenden School in Kent. Her father was the newspaper editor Sir John Junor and her brother Roderick (1944–2000), to whom she was very close throughout his life, was a leader writer for The Daily Telegraph and speechwriter for Margaret Thatcher. She studied history at St Andrews University but left in her second year to get married.

== Career ==
Junor started out on television in 1981, aged 32, presenting a programme called Collecting Now when she worked as a reporter. The following year in 1982, she presented 4 what's it worth which was an award-winning consumer programme broadcast by Channel 4 in which she worked as an investigative reporter and presenter. This programme continued until 1989. In addition, she also co-presented The Afternoon Show on BBC1 with singer Barbara Dickson from 1984 to 1985.

Junor was the main presenter (1988–1997) of the Travel Show Guides on BBC2 alongside Matthew Collins (Collins named 'The Special Assignments Man' did all the travelling) and John Kettley presented the weather forecast for the holiday destination for the forthcoming week or so. The guides were brief and concise films enabling holidaymakers to learn about the resort that was highlighted before travelling there.

Junor has written several books about the British royal family; she has written biographies of Diana, Princess of Wales (1982) and Charles, Prince of Wales (1987 and 1998), and Charles and Diana: Portrait of a Marriage (1991). The Firm: The Troubled Life of the House of Windsor followed in 2005. Her work on the Waleses "alienated" both of them and she reportedly considers the experience the worst of her career. She has also written and had published a book titled Prince William: The Man Who Will Be King (2012). This biography of Prince William ends with his marriage to Catherine Middleton. Junor's biography of Prince Harry, Prince Harry: Brother, Soldier, Son, was published in 2014.

Junor's other books include works on Margaret Thatcher (1983), actor Richard Burton (1986) and John Major (1993). She subsequently said in an interview that she found Major to be a failure as a British prime minister. In 2007, she co-authored Wonderful Today with Pattie Boyd, the former fashion model and former wife of English rock stars George Harrison and Eric Clapton. Junor assisted Sir Cliff Richard in writing the number one best-selling My Life, My Way (2008) which sold over 250,000 copies and Shaun Ellis with his book The Man Who Lives with Wolves (2009). Her father, John Junor, was the subject of her memoir Home Truths: Life Around My Father (2002), "an unflattering account".

Junor has worked for the Evening Standard and a column for Private Eye lasted five years.

== Personal life ==
Junor married ex-restaurateur James Leith (the brother of Prue) in 1970. She has four children with her husband; their eldest son is the journalist Sam Leith.

== Bibliography ==
- Junor, Penny; Diana, Princess of Wales: A Biography, Sidgwick & Jackson, 1982. ISBN 9780283988431.
- Junor, Penny; Charles and Diana: Portrait of a Marriage, Trafalgar Square, 1991. ISBN 9780747203506.
- Junor, Penny; Queen Elizabeth II: 1952-1992: A Pictorial Celebration of Her Reign, Longmeadow Press, 1992. ISBN 9780681414723.
- Junor, Penny; Charles: Victim or Villain?, HarperCollins, 1998. ISBN 9780002559003.
- Junor, Penny; The Firm: The Troubled Life of the House of Windsor, Bertrams Print On Demand, 2009 [2005]. ISBN 9780007326464.
- Junor, Penny; Prince William: The Man Who Will Be King, Open Road Media, 2012. ISBN 9781453264836.
- Junor, Penny; Prince Harry: Brother, Soldier, Son, Grand Central Publishing, 2014. ISBN 9781455549849.
- Junor, Penny; The Duchess: Camilla Parker Bowles and the Love Affair that Rocked the Crown, HarperCollins, New York, 29 June 2017. ISBN 9780062471123.
- Junor, Penny; All The Queen's Corgis: Corgis, Dorgis and Gundogs: The Story of Elizabeth II and Her Most Faithful Companions, Hodder & Stoughton, 2018. ISBN 9781473686755.
