= William Maxwell =

William Maxwell may refer to:

== Arts ==
- William Maxwell (engraver) (c. 1766–1809), printer of the Sentinel of the Northwest Territory newspaper in Cincinnati, Ohio
- W. B. Maxwell (William Babington Maxwell, 1866–1938), British novelist
- William Hamilton Maxwell (1792–1850), Scots-Irish novelist
- William James Maxwell (1843–1903), Scottish-born sculptor in Australia
- William Maxwell (American writer) (1908–2000), American editor and writer

== Education ==
- William Maxwell (educator) (1784–1857), president of Hampden–Sydney College
- William Henry Maxwell (educator) (1852–1920), superintendent of public schools in New York City

== Military ==
- William Maxwell (Continental Army general) (1733–1796), Irish-born American soldier from New Jersey in the American Revolutionary War
- William C. Maxwell (1892–1920), American pilot in the United States Air Force
- William Henry Maxwell (Royal Navy officer) (1840–1920), Royal Navy admiral

== Politics and administration ==
- Sir William Maxwell, 5th Baronet, of Monreith, British MP for Wigtownshire, 1805–1812 and 1822–1830
- William Maxwell (Australian politician) (1867–1921), gold miner and member of the Queensland Legislative Assembly
- William Maxwell (co-operator) (1841–1929), Scottish co-operative activist
- William Maxwell (railroad executive) (1794–1856), American business executive and politician, president of the Erie Railroad 1842–1843
- William Edward Maxwell, British colonial official, governor of the Gold Coast
- George Maxwell (colonial administrator) (William George Maxwell, 1871–1959), British naturalist and colonial administrator in British Malaya and Straits Settlements
- William Herries Maxwell (1852–1933), British MP for Dumfriesshire, 1892–1895 and 1900–1906
- William John Maxwell, naval governor of Guam

== Sports ==
- William Maxwell (footballer) (1876–1940), Scottish footballer, manager of the Belgium national football team
- Bill Maxwell (1882–1917), Australian rules footballer

== Other ==
- William Maxwell, 5th Lord Herries of Terregles (died 1603), Scottish politician
- William Maxwell, 5th Earl of Nithsdale (1676–1744), Catholic nobleman
- William Maxwell (clergyman) (1732–1818), clergyman and noted companion to Dr Johnson
- William Maxwell (doctor) (1769–1826), Scottish physician
- William Maxwell (journalist) (1860–1928), British journalist, soldier, writer and civil servant
- William Sutherland Maxwell (1874–1952), Canadian architect and a Hand of the Cause in the Bahá'í Faith
- William L. Maxwell (1934–2026), American computer scientist
- William Graham Henderson Maxwell (1928–1999), Australian geologist and academic

== See also ==
- Billy Maxwell (1929–2021), American golfer
- Billy Maxwell (coach) (1942–2023), American track and field coach
- Charles William Maxwell (1775–1848), governor of the British crown colony of Sierra Leone 1811–1815
- Willie Maxwell, birth name of American rapper Fetty Wap
