= Jacques Chambrun =

American literary agent

Jacques Chambrun (April 24, 1906 – September 8, 1976) was an American literary agent active in the 1940s and 1950s. He worked with a wide swath of clients, including novelists Mavis Gallant, Zora Neale Hurston, Aldous Huxley, W. Somerset Maugham, Grace Metalious, H. G. Wells, and Virginia Woolf, along with screenwriter Ben Hecht and historian Shelby Foote. However, he soon gained notoriety for his business practices, including embezzling money from writers.

== Biography ==
Chambrun was born April 24, 1906. The details of Chambrun's upbringing are unknown. Chambrun claimed that he was descended from French aristocracy, but he is believed to have grown up in The Bronx in New York City. His date of birth and real name are also disputed. A record exists of a "Jacques Chambrun" born in 1906 in New York City, but it is unclear whether this is the same person. A 1928 naturalization record asserts that Jacques Chambrun (formerly known as James Jabib and Djemy Tabib) was born in Beirut, Syria and had arrived in the U.S. by way of Constantinople in 1922. He told the 1950 census taker that he was a 39-year-old magazine publisher born in France but now a naturalized citizen. Chambrun's death certificate stated that he was 60 years old in 1976, but several people who knew him believed he was older than that.

Chambrun presented himself as an ostentatious figure; editor Knox Burger remarked that the man evoked "an unctuous Levantine villain in a 1950 film noir." He was known to wear boutonnieres and pinstriped suits, travel in chauffeured vehicles, keep an office across from the Plaza Hotel, and throw what The New Yorker described as "Hugh Hefner-style pool parties." This image enticed writers; Grace Metalious reportedly decided to work with him based on his French name alone.

Chambrun became notorious for shady dealings with clients. He frequently was known to sell manuscripts and stories without the permission or knowledge of his clients, earning a significant commission on them -- 20 to 30 percent, compared to the more typical 15%. He would use the proceeds from these sales to pay off debts to other writers in what The New Yorker likened to a "literary pyramid scheme." Such incidents include negotiating world rights to W. Somerset Maugham's books and embezzling $30,000 from the writer, causing Maugham to fire him in 1948. Another writer, Mavis Gallant, wrote in her diaries about waiting for Chambrun to pay her for stories that had run in The New Yorker while near-broke in Spain, selling her clock for breakfast money. Some writers were warned not to work with him, such as James Michener and Vladimir Nabokov, whose Lolita Chambrun wished to handle movie rights for. Most of his clients eventually severed ties, with varying levels of animosity.

Another controversy involving Chambrun took place in 1954, this time involving Ben Hecht and actress Marilyn Monroe, whose biography he was co-writing. Chambrun sold scandalous portions of Hecht's manuscript without his or Monroe's permission to British tabloid the Empire News. Some writers also believe that Chambrun made significant edits to the text. Chambrun received 1,000 pounds sterling for the excerpts, which ran from May to August 1954. Upon publication they scandalized Monroe's studio bosses and enraged Hecht, who was forced to sell back his advance to Doubleday Press. Hecht never finished the biography's final chapters and would not publish what he had until 1974.

During the 1950s, Chambrun noticed Elvis Presley's massive following among teenagers. He purchased stories and photos from the archives of a Memphis, Tennessee newspaper and compiled them in a 1956 book called All About Elvis, which sold out. Emboldened by its success, Chambrun spun it off into a magazine inspired by Seventeen magazine, called 16. He and a partner would write most of the articles under the pen name "Georgia Winters." The first issue featured Elvis on the cover. When Chambrun met model Gloria Stavers at a party, she was hired and eventually became the magazine's longstanding editor.

Chambrun died on September 8, 1976, possibly from a car crash.
