= Wonderful Today =

2007 book by Pattie Boyd and Penny Junor

- Cover of the original UK edition
- Author: Pattie Boyd with Penny Junor
- Language: English
- Genre: Autobiography, memoir
- Published: Headline Review
- Publication date: 23 August 2007
- Publication place: United Kingdom
- Pages: 320
- ISBN: 978-0-755316427

Wonderful Today, subtitled The Autobiography, is the 2007 autobiography by English former fashion model and photographer Pattie Boyd, written with journalist and broadcaster Penny Junor. It was published by Headline Review in Britain, on 23 August 2007, and by Harmony Books in the United States, where it was titled Wonderful Tonight: George Harrison, Eric Clapton, and Me. Beginning with her childhood in Kenya, the book covers Boyd's modelling career in London during the 1960s, her marriage to and divorce from Beatles guitarist George Harrison and later marriage and divorce of Harrison's best friend, Eric Clapton. The book's title is in reference to Clapton's 1977 song "Wonderful Tonight", which he wrote about Boyd.

== Reception ==
Reviewing Wonderful Today for The Daily Telegraph, Lynn Barber described it as "absolutely gripping" and a memoir that "gives more insight into the weirdness of rock-star life than anything I have ever read". Simon Vozick-Levinson of Entertainment Weekly gave the book a B+ rating and wrote: "Boyd pads her pages with a few too many humdrum memories, but her detailed chronicle of her legendary exes' slides into infidelity and substance abuse will thrill classic-rock buffs with a taste for scandal." In her review for The Austin Chronicle, Margaret Moser described it as "a sweet, sad memoir that rings true", with the best chapters dedicated to Boyd's life in the 1960s through to the end of her marriage with Clapton, after which she "turns the mirror inward, and the book becomes SFF – strictly for fans".

In the United States, the book debuted at the top of the New York Times Best Seller list. In an interview the following year, for the website entertainment.ie, Boyd said she was surprised at the extent of the book's success.
