= John Junor =

Scottish journalist and editor

Sir John Donald Brown Junor (15 January 1919 – 3 May 1997) was a Scottish journalist. He was editor-in-chief of the Sunday Express from 1954 to 1986, having previously worked as a columnist there. He moved in 1989 to The Mail on Sunday, where he remained until his death.

Noted for his deliberately provocative views, Junor was described by the Conservative MP Julian Critchley as "possibly the best-known Scotsman in England" during the 1980s and as "an ill-natured populist with a taste for common-or-garden abuse".

== Early life ==
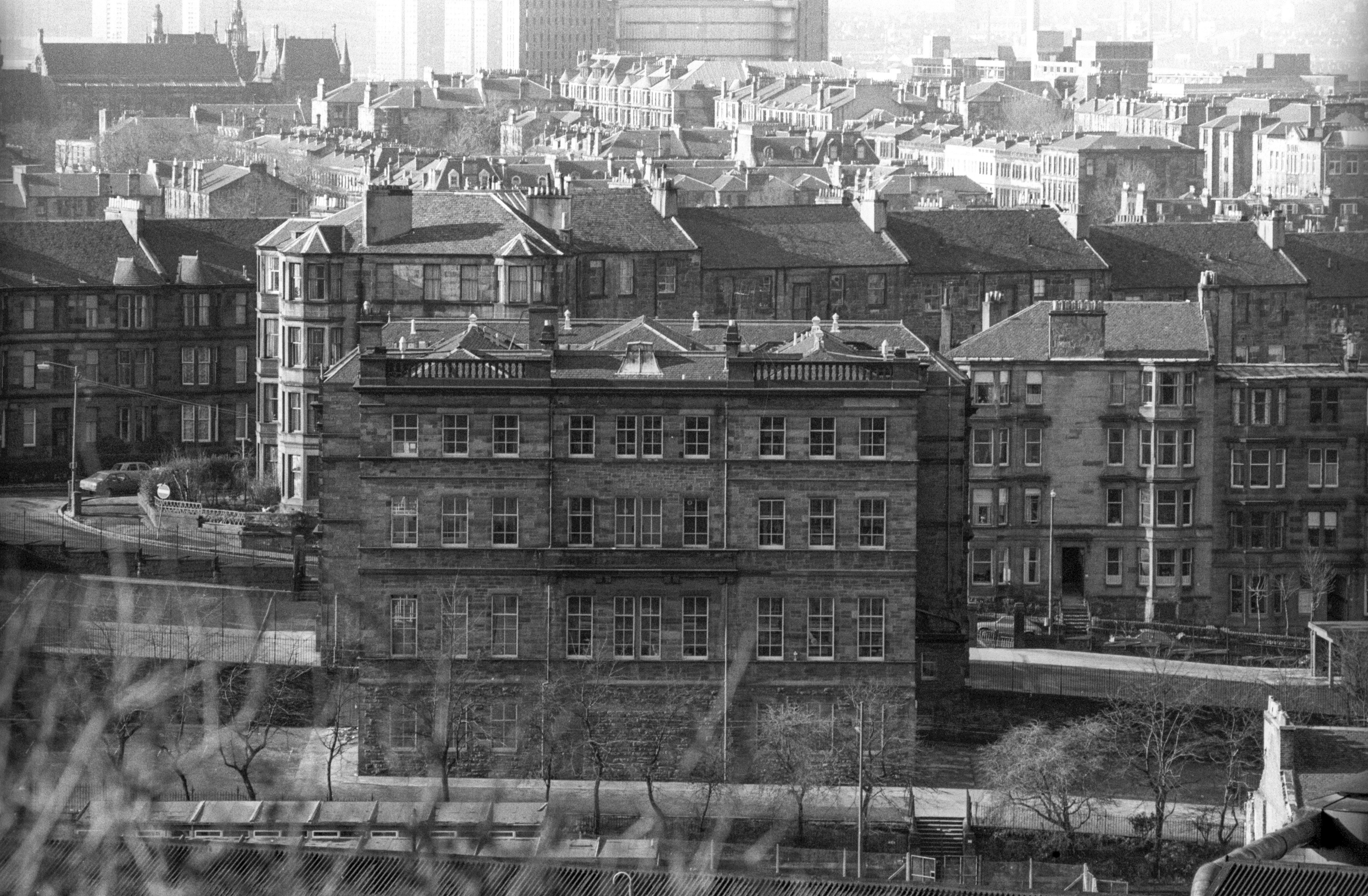
North Kelvinside Secondary School in Maryhill, Glasgow, which Junor attended in the 1930s.

Born in Glasgow into a "Scottish Presbyterian, respectable working class" family, Junor was raised in what he later described as "a red-stone tenement in Shannon Street in Maryhill... [in] a two roomed-flat without indoor sanitation", but by his teens he was living with his parents and brothers in a more spacious flat, with three rooms and a kitchen, in Oban Drive. He attended North Kelvinside Secondary School (later merged into Cleveden Secondary School) before proceeding to study English Literature at Glasgow University.

As a student, he was "violently anti-Fascist, anti-Franco, above all anti-Hitler", and in 1938, he became president of the university's Liberal Club. Shortly before graduation, Junor was recruited by the Liberal Party activist Lady Glen-Coats to accompany her on a fact-finding tour of the Third Reich; they reportedly managed to escape Germany only days before the outbreak of the Second World War in September 1939.

During the war, Junor had a commission in the Fleet Air Arm, where he edited a station magazine which so impressed the Admiralty he was invited to become the assistant editor of a new magazine intended for the entire branch of the service. After the original choice for editor, A. P. Herbert, declined to take up the role, Junor was appointed in his place and named the magazine Flight Deck. Following demobilisation, he worked for a time in The Sydney Sun's London office before joining the Daily Express in 1947 as a reporter on a salary of 18 guineas a week.

== Journalism ==
After working at the Daily Express for six years, Junor was briefly a deputy editor at the Evening Standard before, in 1954, joining the Sunday Express, where he was made editor-in-chief and remained for 32 years. His Sunday Express column (which he continued to write in his years as editor-in-chief) was noted for recurrent catchphrases, two of them being "pass the sick-bag, Alice" and "I don't know, but I think we should be told". Junor frequently mentioned the small town Auchtermuchty in Fife.

Junor could be brutally forthright in his column. In 1984, he wrote: "[W]ith compatriots like these [the IRA Brighton bombers] wouldn't you rather admit to being a pig than be Irish?" Following complaints that the comment was racist, Junor was censured by the Press Council in May 1985.

He was often lampooned in Private Eye, which nicknamed him Sir Jonah Junor and called the Daily Express building on Fleet Street the Black Lubyanka.

=== Contempt of Parliament ===
On 24 January 1957, Junor was called to the Bar of the House of Commons to be reprimanded for contempt of Parliament – the last non-politician to be so called. The matter concerned an article about petrol allocation that appeared in the Sunday Express on 16 December 1956. Junor apologised:

Mr Speaker, I wish to express my sincere and unreserved apologies for any imputations or reflection which I may have cast upon the honour and integrity of the Members of this House in the article which I published in the Sunday Express of 16th December. At no time did I intend to be discourteous to Parliament. My only aim was to focus attention on what I considered to be an injustice in the allocation of petrol, namely, the petrol allowances given to political parties in the constituencies. In my judgment these allowances were a proper and, indeed, an inescapable subject of comment in a free Press. That was a view which I held then and hold now, Sir, but I do regret, deeply and sincerely, that the manner in which I expressed myself should have been such as to be a contempt of this House. I have nothing more to say. I now leave myself in the hands of this House.

== Politics ==
Ambitious for a parliamentary seat, in the 1945 General Election Junor contested Kincardine and Western Aberdeenshire in the Liberal interest, losing to the Conservative candidate by only 642 votes. He then unsuccessfully fought Edinburgh East at a by-election in 1947 and finally was beaten once more at Dundee West in 1951. From that point on, he moved away from the Liberals (breaking with the party completely over the Suez Crisis) and into the orbit of reactionary, traditional Toryism. He was a vigorous supporter of Margaret Thatcher during her time as Prime Minister and was knighted on her recommendation in 1980.

== Personal life ==
Junor married Pamela Welsh in 1942, and had two children. Journalist Penny Junor is his daughter, and journalist Sam Leith his grandson. He was a lifelong supporter of Partick Thistle.

== Works ==
- The Best of JJ (1981)
- Listening for a Midnight Tram: Memoirs (1990)

== Notes ==
Media offices
Preceded by ?	Deputy Editor of the Evening Standard; 1953–1954	Succeeded by Charles Wintour
Preceded by Harold Keeble	Editor of the Sunday Express; 1954–1986	Succeeded by Robin Esser
