= Sam Leith =

English author, journalist and editor (born 1974)

- Born: 1 January 1974 (age 52); Paddington, London, England
- Education: Eton College
- Alma mater: Magdalen College, Oxford
- Occupations: Journalist, columnist, novelist
- Parent(s): Penny Junor; James Leith
- Relatives: Prue Leith (aunt); Danny Kruger (cousin) John Junor (grandfather)
- Writing career
- Period: 1996–present

Sam Leith (born 1 January 1974) is an English author, journalist and literary editor of The Spectator.

== Career ==
After an education at Eton and Magdalen College, Oxford, Leith worked at the revived satirical magazine Punch, before moving to the Daily Mail and The Daily Telegraph, where he was literary editor until 2008. He writes for publications, including the Financial Times, Prospect, The Spectator, The Wall Street Journal Europe and The Guardian. He had a regular column in the Monday edition of the London Evening Standard. and was a panelist on BBC Two's The Review Show.

Leith has published several works of non-fiction, including Dead Pets, Sod's Law, You Talkin' to Me? and a book of poetry entitled Our Times in Rhymes: A Prosodical Chronicle of Our Damnable Age The Coincidence Engine, his first novel, was published in April 2011. He was a judge on the panel of the 2015 Man Booker Prize, won by Marlon James with A Brief History of Seven Killings. In November 2016, Leith was named the winner of the Columnist of the Year award at The Editorial Intelligence Comment Awards.

Leith succeeded Mark Amory as literary editor of The Spectator in September 2014, where he described himself as "this magazine’s token wishy-washy centre-left liberal". Since January 2024, Leith has written a monthly Spectator column on computer gaming.

== Published books ==
- Dead Pets: Eat Them, Stuff Them, Love Them (Canongate, 2005)
- Daddy, Is Timmy in Heaven Now? (Canongate, 2006)
- Sod's Law: Why Life Always Falls Butter Side Down (Atlantic, 2009)
- The Coincidence Engine (Bloomsbury, 2011)
- You Talkin' to Me?: Rhetoric from Aristotle to Obama (Profile Books, 2011)
- Words Like Loaded Pistols: Rhetoric from Aristotle to Obama (Basic Books, 2012) – US edition
- Write to the Point: How To Be Clear, Correct and Persuasive on the Page (Profile Books, 2017)
- Write to the Point: A Master Class on the Fundamentals of Writing for Any Purpose (The Experiment, 2018) – US edition
- Our Times in Rhymes: A Prosodical Chronicle of Our Damnable Age, illus. Edith Pritchett (Square Peg, 2019), OCLC 1129688625
- The Haunted Wood: A History of Childhood Reading (Oneworld, 2024)
