= William Graham Henderson Maxwell =

Australian geologist and academic

William Graham Henderson Maxwell (known as Graham Maxwell) (30 November 1928 - 18 July 1999) was an Australian geologist and academic who did extensive research on the Great Barrier Reef.

== Early life ==
Maxwell was born in Atherton, Queensland in 1928. He was the grandson of the Scottish born newspaper pioneer - he founded the Cairns Argus, the Atherton News and the Barron Valley Advocate - William Graham Henderson (1864-1943). He attended Gordonvale State School and Thornburgh College in Charters Towers.

He enrolled in the University of Queensland and took his B.Sc. with Honours degree in 1950. He was awarded a CSIRO scholarship to continue his studies. Maxwell was the first person to be awarded a PhD at the University of Queensland, in 1952, under the supervision of Dorothy Hill.

He was awarded the Beit Fellowship for Scientific Research to Imperial College London in 1952.

== Career ==
In the mid-1950s, Maxwell worked as a geologist for Shell in Trinidad. He also lectured at the University of Queensland from 1960-1966 and helped to identify the Yarrol Basin in 1964. He was an associate professor in geology at the University of Sydney from 1967-1972, retiring in 1972. Maxwell was a postdoctoral fellow at the University of Texas at Austin in 1964.

Maxwell and his team of students at the University of Sydney, mapped the surface sediments of the whole of the Great Barrier Reef province for the book, Atlas of the Great Barrier Reef. They used aerial photography to conduct their geomorphological work.

From 1965, some of Maxwell's research was supported by the American Petroleum Institute and the Petroleum Research Fund of the American Chemical Society.

In 1970, Maxwell gave evidence to the Commonwealth crown-of-thorns starfish committee of inquiry.

He took his D.Sc. from the University of Queensland in 1970.

Maxwell died in Toowoomba, Queensland in 1999.

== Publications ==
- Elements of the stratigraphy of Queensland (1962)
- Atlas of the Great Barrier Reef (1968)
- Bibliography of the Great Barrier Reef Province (1978)
- Offshore Australia : the continental shelf, the slope, and beyond prepared by Bank of New South Wales
- A school on the towers : the story of Blackheath and Thornburgh College (1919-1987) (1988)

== Professional memberships ==
Maxwell was made life member of Queensland Paleontological Society in 1963.
