= Gloria Stavers =

American magazine editor (1927–1983)

Gloria Stavers (October 3, 1927 – April 1, 1983) was the editor in chief of 16 Magazine. Her personality gave this teen celebrity magazine its stamp for many years. Stavers is credited with being one of the first women rock-and-roll journalists, but male editors, detractors and those who scoffed at teen or celebrity magazines sometimes called her "Mother Superior of the Inferior".

== Early years ==
Very little is known of Stavers' childhood and adolescence. She was born Gloria Gurganus in Wilmington, North Carolina. She had married and divorced young, and moved to New York to pursue a modeling career. For a time she was involved socially with the "jet set" and was rumored to be involved romantically with baseball player Mickey Mantle. Health issues forced Stavers to give up modeling.

Stavers got her start at 16 Magazine in 1957 after meeting its founder, Jacques Chambrun, at a party in New York. She initially worked as a subscriptions clerk, paid 50 cents an hour. Stavers developed many of her ideas about how the magazine should be run by reading the fan letters from preteenaged girls writing to various celebrities in care of the magazine. As she read those letters, she remembered how she felt as a preteenager and what she most cared about at that age.

Stavers had no experience in journalism nor did she possess a university degree, but she rose quickly through the ranks. She was promoted to the position of editor in chief, wherein she had unprecedented access to many of the top recording acts of the day. Although 16 Magazine had a staff of reporters on both coasts, Stavers wrote most of the magazine's feature articles herself. She also served as the magazine's chief photographer and shot numerous photographs of stars such as Paul Revere and the Raiders, Peter Noone of Herman's Hermits, The Rascals, and Jim Morrison, lead singer of The Doors.

== Editorial style ==
Stavers was known for being singleminded regarding the image of "her" magazine. Her main priority was giving her teenage female reader base what it wanted, and what they wanted, according to Stavers, was the feeling of being "close" to their favorite stars. Stavers would receive more than 300 letters per day addressed to her from teenagers. She read every letter and took their words to heart, and then tried to use the magazine to address the concerns that were often written off as "silly" by adults.

As an editor, she eschewed serious or controversial subject matter for 16 Magazine interviews. Rather than asking a celebrity about social issues, she preferred to discuss more personal and lightly intimate topics such a celebrity's favorite color or meal or to ask him who his idea of a "dream date" would be. Her style of interviewing was referred to as the "Forty Intimate Questions." Her first interview using that format was with the Canadian pop singer Paul Anka.

Stavers, in her writings, attempted to make the celebrity appear approachable and "attainable" for her young readers. In short, the celebrity was a "surrogate boyfriend" for the reader. If the artist was married, in a long-term relationship or was not heterosexual in orientation, that fact was never mentioned in the magazine.

In her editorial content, Stavers seldom if ever wrote critical or unflattering prose regarding any celebrity. She preferred to focus on the positive qualities of the "faves". She ignored those celebrities and musical acts who she felt would not capture her readers' interest, or those who failed to capture her personal interest. If the "fave" appeared to have fallen out of favor, then Stavers merely stopped covering that celebrity in the magazine, and would find someone else to feature.

Despite frequently using a teenzine shorthand for some words such as "fave" for favorite, and "cuz" for the word because, Stavers was a stickler for correct spelling and grammar.

== Influence ==
According to a feature article in the Saturday Evening Post in 1967, record companies frequently consulted Stavers as to how to best promote an artist, and would not make a decision until she weighed in with her opinion. At that time, few women in any field wielded such power.

Tony Barrow, the press officer to the Beatles, credits Stavers with providing "significant help" toward the task of fast-tracking the band to the top of the U.S. charts. In the months before their first visit to the US, a substantial volume of the editorial space in 16 was given to the Beatles. Paul McCartney remembered Gloria as being "very dignified, very professional and totally business-like. She inspired respect from us all".

In the 1980 movie The Idolmaker, there is an unflattering portrayal of a mercurial "prima donna" teen magazine editor, based loosely on Stavers. The role of Ellen Fields was played by Maureen McCormick of The Brady Bunch. According to some of Stavers's contemporaries, she tended to run roughshod over underlings, and she was known for her use of strong profanities and issuing ultimatums.

However, Stavers was known to threaten some of the "faves" if she didn't get what she wanted from them. In one instance, Stavers allegedly threatened to print the full real name of Paul Revere if he didn't agree to make an appearance at a hospital to visit a dying girl. Revere's full name was Paul Revere Dick.

Despite her many detractors, Stavers had an admirer and defender in American Bandstand host Dick Clark. He said of Stavers, "She had her finger on the pulse of what kids were thinking, which impressed me. We both, as adults, could "think young" and see what was interesting and ascertain what the future would bring in the next few months. Gloria helped American Bandstand, and the show helped 16. It was a two-way street."

Many in the entertainment and publishing industries believed that Stavers and Clark shared the power to "make or break" a teen idol.

At times, Stavers appeared to push people to the forefront who seemed to be unlikely candidates for teen idol status, such as comedian Lenny Bruce, Dark Shadows actor Jonathan Frid, Star Trek actor Leonard Nimoy, and shock rock pioneer Alice Cooper. Stavers also began to experiment with new publishing and photography trends which she incorporated into the magazine.

However, not everyone agreed with Stavers on the right direction for the magazine. According to a 1999 autobiography written by former teen idol Donny Osmond, Stavers and his mother Olive Osmond had a continual disagreement regarding the use of increasingly sexualized pin-up pictures featuring her sons and other teen idols. Stavers was rumored to have become romantically or sexually involved with several of the celebrities she interviewed. Stavers had dated 1950s teen idol Dion DiMucci, and during the 1960s, she was also one of Jim Morrison's long-term lovers.

John Prine, an American country/folk singer-songwriter, dedicated Great Days, an anthology of his work released in 1993, to Gloria Stavers.

== Later years ==
By the mid-1960s and throughout the early 1970s, Stavers was encountering fierce competition from other teen magazines such as Tiger Beat. She also had competition from other journalists now focusing their attentions on the rock music scene such as Patricia Kennealy and Jann Wenner of Rolling Stone.

In 1975, Stavers left 16 Magazine after a publishing dispute. After her departure from the magazine, Stavers worked as a freelance writer and photographer, and she gathered information and outlined a biography about Jim Morrison. She also spent time learning about spirituality, particularly Buddhism.

On April 1, 1983, Stavers died of lung cancer at NewYork–Presbyterian Hospital. She was 55 years old at the time of her death. She was a long term smoker. Stavers' obituary was printed in Rolling Stone magazine, one of 16 Magazine's primary competitors.
