= William Robert Black =

Australian mine-owner and philanthropist (1859–1930)

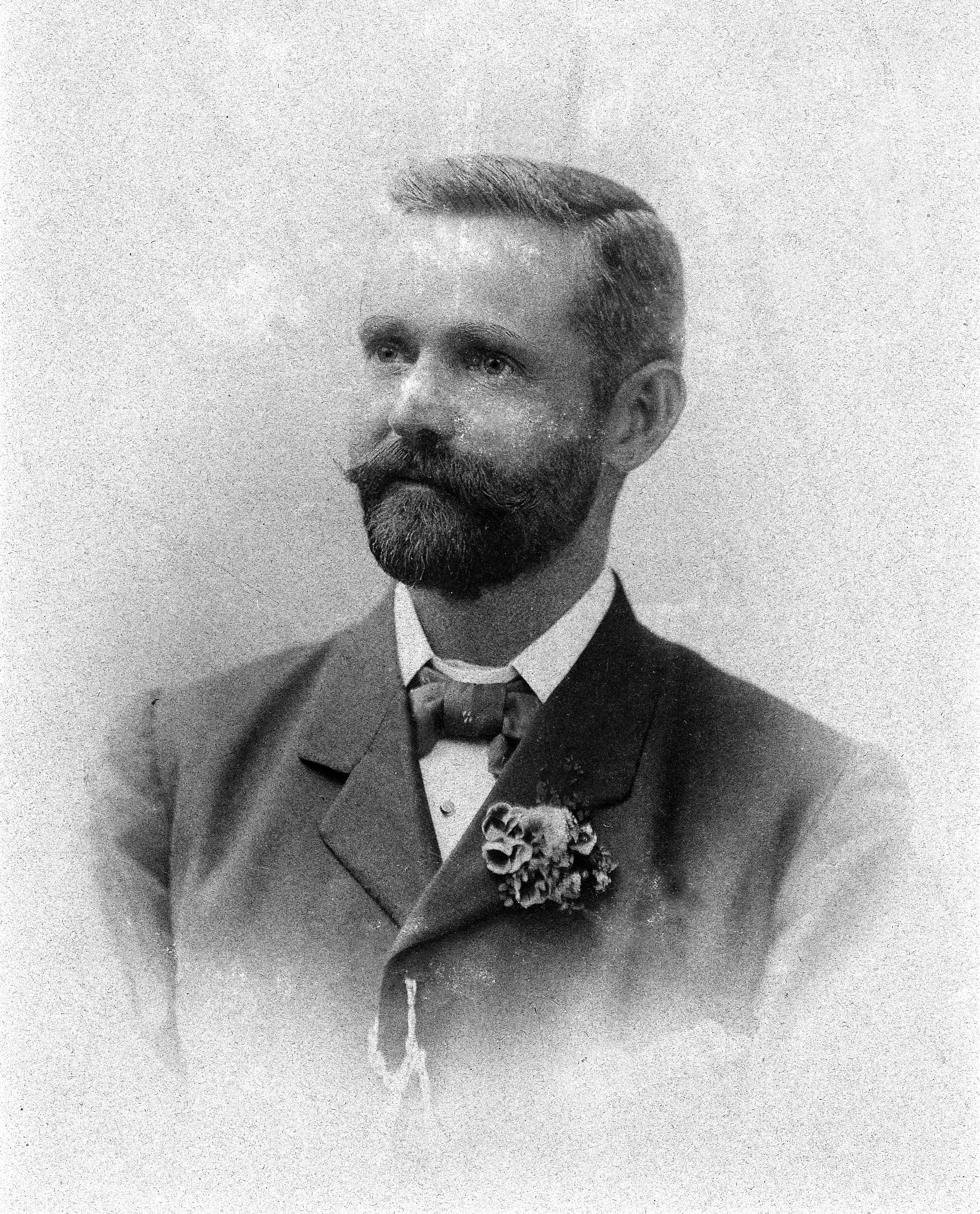
William Robert Black, circa 1898

William Robert Black (1859–1930) was an Australian mine-owner and philanthropist. He donated to establish many Presbyterian churches and supported schools, orphanages and other charitable institutions in Queensland.

== Biography ==
On 20 November 1922, the Queensland Governor Matthew Nathan officially opened the Industrial School for Boys on a site between Moggill Road and Jerrang Road (now 724 Moggill Road, 27.5093°S 152.9564°E) at Indooroopilly (now Chapel Hill). It was operated by the Salvation Army for orphaned, abandoned and neglected boys. The 22-acre (8.9 ha) site was purchased for £2300 by Black and donated to the Salvation Army, He also paid £2700 to extend and renovate the buildings on site and for new furnishings. He also provided for £100 per annum for maintenance. When it opened, there were 35 boys under the supervision of the first superintendent, Ensign Rogan. The school could provide accommodation for 50 boys supervised by nine staff. In 1942 the school relocated to Washpool. As at 2021, the site is still owned by the Salvation Army but is reduced to 53,320 square metres (13.18 acres) and is used to operate The Cairns Aged Care Centre.

== Beneficiaries ==
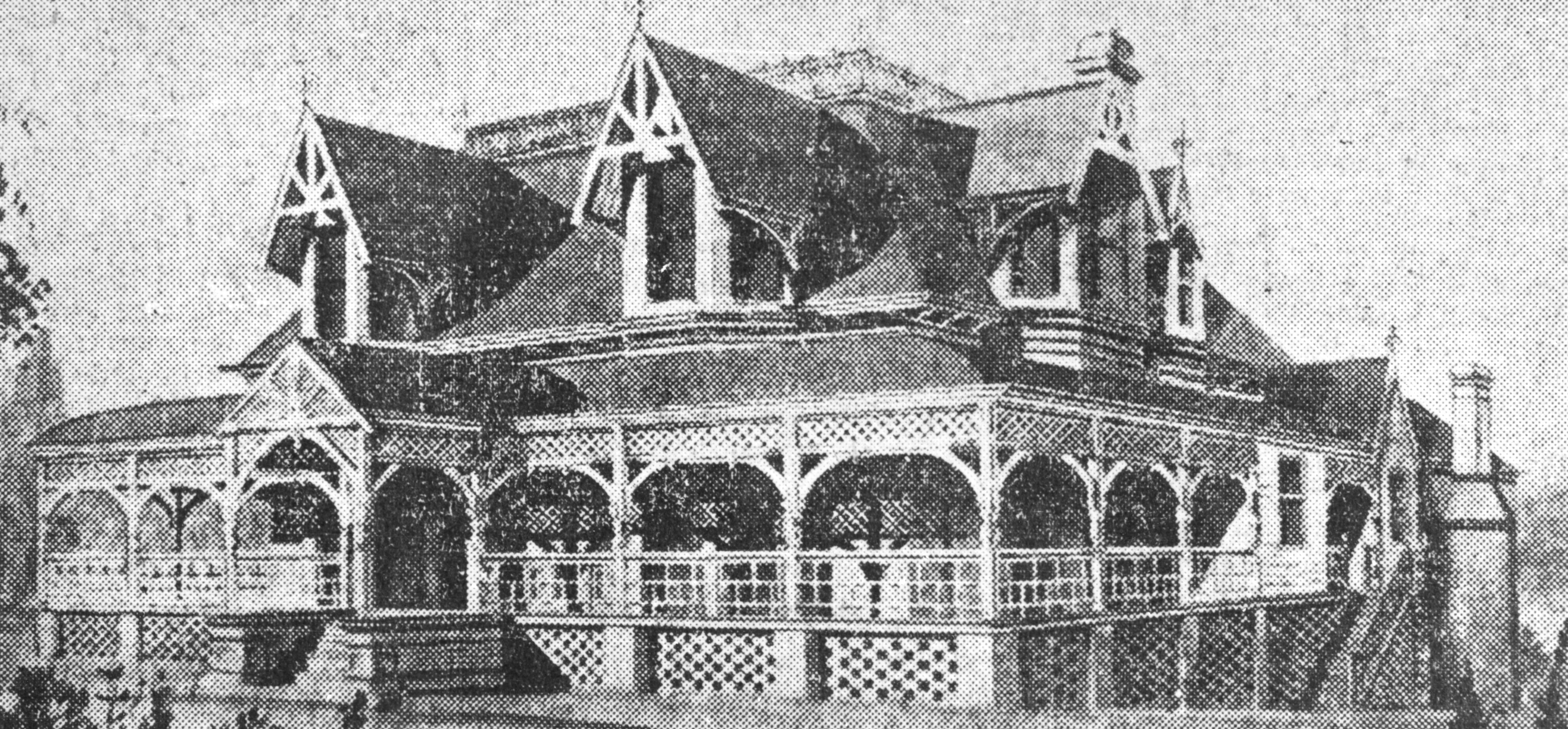
W. R. Black Home for Children, 1928

Black made substantial donations to a number of institutions, including:

=== Churches ===
- the Presbyterian Church at Burleigh Heads
- the Presbyterian Church at Cannon Hill
- the Presbyterian Church at Enoggera
- the Presbyterian Church in Maleny
- the War Memorial stained glass window at St Andrew's Presbyterian (now Uniting) Church in the Brisbane CBD

=== Education ===
- Scots PGC College in Warwick
- Fairholme College in Toowoomba
- Blackheath College in Charters Towers
- Emmanuel College, University of Queensland

=== Children's homes ===
- W. R. Black Children's Home at Chelmer
- Blackheath Home for Children at Oxley
- Salvation Army's Industrial School for Boys at Indooroopilly (now Chapel Hill)

=== Other institutions ===
- Gold Coast Hospital in Southport
- Canberra Hotel in the Brisbane CBD, a temperance hotel
