= Rural marketing =

Promoting rural specific products

Rural marketing is the process of developing, pricing, promoting and distributing rural specific products and services leading to consumer satisfaction and achievement of organizational objectives. It aims to improve standard of living of rural consumers by providing them greater awareness and accessibility to new products and services.

== History ==
There were four phases of rural marketing:

Phase I (before the mid-1960s): Before the mid-1960s, rural marketing focused on agricultural products (such as food grains) and industrial inputs (such as cotton and sugarcane), while excluding heavy and durable products such as tractors, electric motors, and harvesters.

Phase II (mid 1960s-mid 1990s): During this period, it was influenced by Green Revolution, which enabled rural areas to have better irrigation facilities, high yielding seeds, soil testing, and application of implements such as power tillers and harvesters.

Phase III (after the mid-1990s): In the 1980s, the industrial sector of many developing countries like India became increasingly important and its contribution to Gross National Product increased substantially. After the Indian economic reforms of 1991–1992 competition in rural markets increased significantly.

Phase IV (around 2015): This phase marks the emergence of the global market. Globalization resulted in factors such as the information revolution, creation of appropriate technology, increasing urbanization promoted by greater focus on cities leading to the development of rural markets.

== Concept ==
Because rural markets are in high demand, a range of different businesses are looking to them for growth support. A marketing mix framework focuses on delivering the right product, at the right price, using the right promotion strategy, choosing an appropriate distribution channel, and fostering long-term relationships with customers. Traditional literature in the field focused on 4P's (Product, Price, Place, and Promotion) as the drivers of marketing. Rural marketing is nowadays understood through the axes of 4As: Availability, Affordability, Acceptability, and Awareness.

Availability: In remote rural settings, providing consistent product availability is a fundamental aspect of rural marketing, as rural populations are often daily wage earners who spend money on their basic needs on a regular basis. Thus, they tend to opt for substitute products when necessary.

- Coca-Cola has developed a hub-and-spoke distribution plan to reach villages, as it views rural India as a developing market. In order to stay stocked, the company receives supplies twice a week from large distributors. Distributors in these areas then appoint and supply smaller distributors in neighboring areas once a week.
- The bike manufacturer Hero Honda has introduced ‘servicing on wheels’ that makes it easy for consumers to service their vehicles from remote locations.

Affordability: Targeting rural consumers who are more price-sensitive, marketers introduced smaller packages at cheaper rates in order to capture their attention.

- For instance, in July 2021 UK-based companies Unilever and Mondi collaborated to develop aluminum-free, recyclable paper-based packaging for Colman's meal maker and sauces range. Packaging material made of 85% paper replaces the multi-material laminate previously used.
- In Columbia, Amcor introduced a plastic sachet for powered chocolate in June 2021. This sachet is designed so that the chocolate will be protected from atmospheric humidity. It also reduces carbon emissions by 53%.
- To grab the rural market, Hindustan Unilever launched products like Sunsilk, Head & Shoulders in sachets which are quite affordable to rural consumers.
- For the rural market, Eveready developed low-cost lanterns.
- Idea Cellular, launched Behtar Zindagi, a VAS rural areas.
- Philips introduced smokeless stove named Chulha for rural population.

Acceptability: To derive some value from the product to satisfy the need of the consumer, much emphasis is given to product design. It shows their acceptance towards the brand if the rural consumers are willing to pay more for the product.

- LG has launched a television named Sampoorna which is a customized television for the rural markets.
- Coca-Cola provided ice boxes as an alternative to refrigerators for seasonal stores.
- Philips introduced a color television range named Vardaan, a customized television for rural market which works on low voltage.

Awareness: Keeping in mind the low accessibility of media (such as television and smartphones) among the rural population, marketers need to capture the attention of rural consumers by focusing on communication and entertainment channels that are readily available in rural areas.

- Microsoft is collaborating with Chinese government to bring technology to the rural population. Microsoft provided two of six Info Wagons to small town in Luohe, Henan Province in Central China, as part of an innovative rural computing pilot programme. The high-tech buses, each with 15 students PCs and one instructor PC, will travel to remote areas around one of China's most populous provinces to function as mobile computer training centres.
- To tap the potential rural market, Hero Honda launched the 'Har Gaaon Har Angan' (every house, every village) campaign.
- At Kumbh Mela where thousands of people converge for a month, Colgate Palmolive supplied herbal toothpaste free of charge.

== The initiatives undertaken by organizations ==
As a part of their Corporate Social Responsibility (CSR), companies operating in metropolitan markets also participate in rural development operations. Some prominent examples are:

- DuPont, an American-based company is trying to enhance the lives of 3 million farmers and their rural communities by increasing maize productivity and income through agronomic training (the field of economics concerned with the distribution, management, and productivity of land), improved inputs, and increased access to loans, markets, and grain storage. To achieve this, DuPont has established a partnership with the Government of Ethiopia and the U.S. Agency for International Development (USAID).
- The International Labour Organization (ILO) is assisting a number of countries, including Zimbabwe, to improve rural women's employment and economic empowerment, Kenya, to improve access to financial services in rural areas, and Nepal and India, to improve rural infrastructure through employment-intensive investment programmes.
- As a part of Digital India initiative, e-commerce players like Flipkart, Snapdeal, Infibeam, and mobile wallet major Paytm have signed Memoranda of Understanding (MoUs) with the government to reach rural areas by connecting with the government's common service centres (CSCs) being set up in villages.
- Godrej Good Knight's commercial emphasizes children's education by providing mosquito protection, which would otherwise distract them from their studies. With this knowledge, Good Knight Fastcard decided to introduce ‘Fastcard ki Paathshaala’, a voice-based education Interactive Voice Response (IVR) – that might help rural markets while also serving as an educational enabler. And, by using mobile phone, effectively bringing a classroom into their homes.
- Dabur India Limited has launched a voluntary organization- Sundesh for the development of rural areas. This programme takes into consideration the holistic approach covering various aspects like health, literacy, employment and empowerment.
- Hindustan Unilever Limited (HUL) has launched Project Shakti, a programme that helps rural women across India develop an entrepreneurial mindset and become financially self sufficient. These women entrepreneurs (known as Shakti Ammas), are trained in basic distribution management and familiarization with company's products in order to provide them with a steady income.
- Unilever took the concept a new level in Pakistan by launching Guddi Baji, a programme that trains hundreds of local women to work as beauticians from the comfort of their own homes. Unilever tackled the issue of gender inequality through this programme. Guddi Baji, which means "Good Sister", is a female community influencer programme that assists women in becoming self sufficient and gaining economic empowerment.
- Integrated Watershed Management Programme (IWMP), an initiative by Mahindra and Mahindra is a Public Private Partnership (PPP) model with Government of Madhya Pradesh in the district of Damoh. The programme is believed to solve the issue of climate change as it helps in conserving soil fertility, increasing productivity of crops, restoring ground water table, etc. along with the development of community.
