= Encyclopedia of Hinduism =

Encyclopedia

Encyclopedia of Hinduism, 1st ed., 2012, is a comprehensive, multi-volume, English language encyclopedia of Hinduism, comprising Sanātana Dharma, a Sanskrit phrase, meaning "the eternal law", or the "eternal way", that is used to refer to Hinduism, Buddhism, Jainism and Sikhism. It is a 7,184 page, 11-volume publication with full-color illustrations of temples, places, thinkers, rituals and festivals. Encyclopedia of Hinduism is an inspiration and dream project of Chidanand Saraswati, President of Parmarth Niketan and India Heritage Research Foundation. Under preparation for 25 years, it has been edited by Kapil Kapoor with contribution from over 2000 scholars.

The encyclopedia provides conceptual perspective and a general understanding of the different facets of Hinduism. It does not confine itself to religion alone, and has in it entries on art, history, language, literature, philosophy, polity, sciences, and women's studies. The editorial introduction records:

"This encyclopaedia has been prepared to give a fairly comprehensive idea of an ancient way of life, a culture that has roots going back thousands of years and has been called 'Hinduism' in the last two hundred years of English discourse. It is a book of knowledge about facts, theories, systems, practices, institutions, beliefs, texts, thinkers and values of, what in fact is, a continuity of one of the two living knowledge cultures of the world, the Vedic (Semitic being the other). Hindu society has been a 'knowledge society' in its proper sense for at least 5000 years: the word 'Veda' itself means 'knowledge'."

On 3–4 April 2010, a preview and blessings ceremony for the Encyclopedia of Hinduism was held at Parmarth Niketan, attended by the Dalai Lama, M.M. Swami Gurusharananand, Swami Avdheshanand Giri, Ramesh Oza, Ramdev, Morari Bapu and other religious leaders as well as top political leaders, including L. K. Advani and then-Chief Minister of Uttarakhand Ramesh Pokhriyal, and IHRF board members and trustees.

The International Edition of the Encyclopedia of Hinduism was launched at the University of South Carolina on 26 September 2013.

The Encyclopedia of Hinduism was presented to the President of India Pranab Mukherjee on 23 June 2014.

== Inception ==
The idea was conceived by Chidanand Saraswati, president of Parmarth Niketan Ashram, at a Hindu-Jain Temple in Pittsburgh, Pennsylvania, in 1987. Subsequently, in November of the same year, the India Heritage Research Foundation was formed to execute the idea of preparing an authoritative, comprehensive and up-to-date Encyclopedia of Hinduism. Dr. K. L. Seshagiri Rao, Professor Emeritus in Religious Studies at University of Virginia, was appointed the Chief Editor.

== Development ==
Over the next five years, Swami Chidanand Saraswati and Dr. K. L. Seshagiri Rao assembled an international team of scholars. In 1998, Atal Bihari Vajpayee, Prime Minister of India at the time, spoke effusively in praise of the project:

"Your undertaking is rightly called the 'Project of the Third Millennium.' This is a monumental undertaking. It is indeed a Jnana Yajna. Hence, all those who have offered their time, talent and scholarship as ahuti for the success of this Yajna deserve our heartiest applause and felicitations."

In early 2006, Kapil Kapoor, Professor of English and Concurrent Professor of Sanskrit Studies who had retired as rector for Jawaharlal Nehru University, Delhi the previous year, was appointed chief editor of the project. Physicist Varadaraja V. Raman served as one of four executive editors, for which Raman wrote on Hinduism and Science, and otherwise "served diligently, reviewing, editing, and even rewriting articles where necessary."

== Foreword ==
The first volume of the encyclopedia contains a 44-page foreword by Karan Singh. In the opening paragraph, he writes:

"Hinduism calls itself the Sanatana Dharma, the eternal faith, because it is based not upon the teachings of a single preceptor but on the collective wisdom and inspiration of great seers and sages from the very dawn of Indian civilization."

The closing comments of Dr. Singh's forward begin with the following note:

"The long awaited publication of a massive eleven-volume Encyclopedia of Hinduism is a major publishing event. Many years of scholarship, organization and devotion have gone into the preparation of what will be a landmark in the history of Hindu research."

== Reviews ==
Indrajit Hazra, writing for Hindustan Times, said its "entries are crisp, provide background and foreground, and come with a bibliography." The review goes on to add:

"The production is excellent, as is the quality of images that are scattered across the volumes. With entries that include the Dhammapada (the main text of Theravada Buddhism), the 'Chipko movement' (the organised environmental movement to resist the destruction of forests in India'), as well as the 'Saura Mandala' (solar system), clearly, this is an encyclopedia that doesn't define 'Hinduism' in any narrow, proselytising way."

Hazra concludes his review by calling the encyclopedia "a startlingly good treasure trunk for anyone interested in the history of ideas to dip into." Former Home Minister of India L.K. Advani called the work "a landmark publication."
