= India Development Foundation of Overseas Indians =

India Development Foundation of Overseas Indians (IDF-OI) www.idfoi.nic.in is a not for profit Trust established in 2008 by Government of India with the approval of the Cabinet to serve as a credible institutional avenue to enable overseas Indians to engage in philanthropy to supplement India's social and development efforts. The New Delhi-based Trust is chaired by Sushma Swaraj, Minister for External Affairs and is exempt from the provisions of Foreign Contribution (Regulation) Act, 2010 (FCRA).

According to Smt. Sushma Swaraj the Indian diaspora is a very heterogeneous group and there is a common factor which binds them- their desire to maintain connection with their homeland and to contribute to the social and development efforts in India. IDF-OI seeks to strengthen and deepen this relationship.IDF-OI”.

The Chairperson of the IDF-OI Board of Trustees is Smt. Sushma Swaraj, Minister for External Affairs, the Vice Chairman is Shri Dnyaneshwar M. Mulay, Secretary (OIA and CPV) Ministry of External Affairs and the CEO is Smt. Vani Rao, Joint Secretary (OIA), Ministry of External Affairs. Other Board members are prominent Overseas Indians and eminent Indians who have an active interest in philanthropy.

== Board Members ==
Eminent Overseas Indians

- Dr Bharat Haridas Barai- Medical Director of the Cancer Institute, Methodist Hospitals, Indiana, USA
- Mr. Yusuff Ali M.A.- Chairman and Managing Director, Lulu International, UAE
- Mr. Y. Sudhir Shetty- President, UAE Exchange Centre, UAE
- Mr. Govind Sovale- President, Indo-Swiss Center, Switzerland.

Eminent Resident Indians

- Sri Sri Ravi Shankar- President, The Art of Living
- Mr. Vara Prasad Rongala- Managing Director, Invensis Technologies
- Mr. Ashwini Vaishnaw- Managing Director, GE Transportation
- Swami Chidanand Saraswati- President, Parmarth Niketan Ashram

Ex-Officio Members

- Shri Rajiv Mehrishi, Home Secretary, Ministry of Home Affairs
- Shri Shaktikanta Das, Secretary, Dept of Economic Affairs
- Dr. S. Jaishankar, Foreign Secretary
- Shri Amitabh Kant, CEO, Niti Aayog

IDF-OI Board of Trustees

== Mandate ==
In 2015, IDF-OI’s mandate was revised to channelize contributions from Overseas Indians towards Government’s flagship programmes – National Mission for Clean Ganga; Swachh Bharat Mission, and social and development projects of by State Governments.

The Swachh Bharat Mission (Clean India Mission), a national campaign by the Government of India, aims to accomplish the vision of a 'Clean India' by October 2, 2019, the 150th birthday of Mahatma Gandhi. Similarly, the National Mission for Clean Ganga aims to integrate the efforts to clean and protect the river Ganga.

IDF-OI is also partnering with the State Govts to select projects identified by the State Governments and seek Overseas Indians’ engagement with these projects.

== Objectives of the Trust ==
- Lead overseas Indian philanthropy into India.
- Establish and maintain a 'Social Capital and Philanthropy Network' in India that can provide a list of credible institutions, projects and

programmes.

- Partner with States in India and encourage credible Indian philanthropic organisations
- Promote accountability and 'good practices' in Diaspora philanthropy.

Periodical written reports & photographs on progress in project and outcomes is sent to contributors by recipient organisations through IDF-OI.

== Projects Funded ==
In 2011, IDF-OI facilitated contributions from Overseas Indians for social development projects in states like Assam, Rajasthan & Gujarat and raised funds in areas of rainwater harvesting, educating and mainstreaming disabled children, women's education and sustainable livelihood.

IDF-OI has collected over 88 projects from 15 States i.e. Rajasthan, Maharashtra, Madhya Pradesh, West Bengal, Karnataka, Odisha, Tripura, Sikkim, Mizoram, Bihar, Chhattisgarh, Uttarakhand, Punjab, Jammu and Kashmir, Andhra Pradesh in areas of Sanitation, Education, Women and Child Development, Sustainable Livelihood, and Healthcare.

Since January 2016, 73 Overseas Indians have contributed to IDF-OI. Projects implemented through contributions received from Overseas Indians in 2016 are as follows:

1. One Community Toilet in Vijayawada, Andhra Pradesh
2. One Community Toilet in Varadaraja Nagar, Tirupati, Andhra Pradesh

Projects under implementation:

1. Construction of One Public Toilet in Ram Bagh Garden Amritsar, Punjab
2. Construction of Community Sanitary Complex in Gangtok, Sikkim IDF-OI Projects

Funds have been allocated to projects in Maharashtra, Odisha, Madhya Pradesh, Rajasthan and Jammu & Kashmir. Implementation will commence shortly.

== Online Payment Gateway ==
To enable small and regular contributions to projects and to IDF-OI Pool fund, an online Payment Gateway was launched by Smt. Sushma Swaraj, Minister of External Affairs on 31 July 2016. The Payment Gateway accepts a minimum contribution of US$100 or its equivalent in other foreign currencies into the IDF-OI Pool Fund; or the minimum contribution for project specific funding is the unit cost of the project.

IDF-OI does not charge/deduct any administrative cost from the contributions received from Overseas Indians. Pool Fund
