= Bangla Sahayata Kendra =

Government services web portal

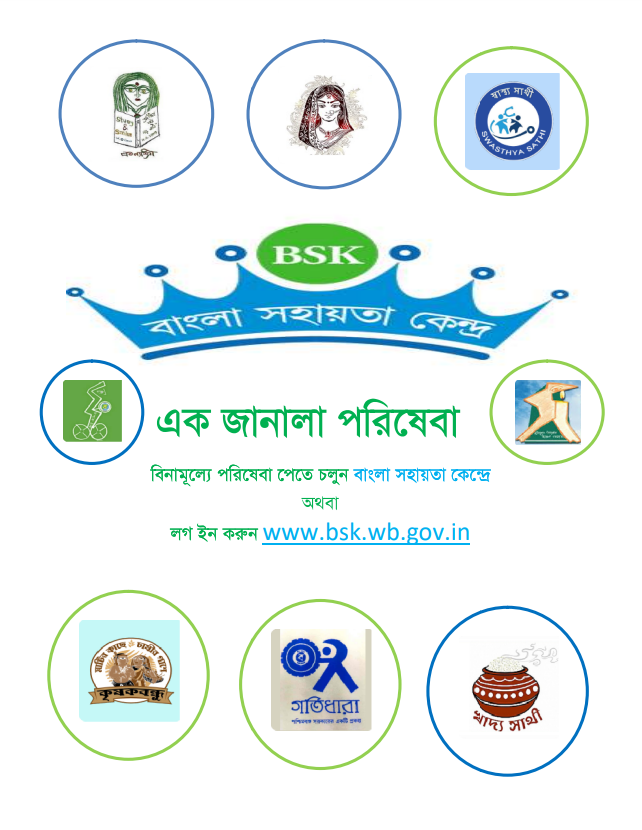
- A promotional advertisement of the Bangla Sahayata Kendra scheme of the Government of West Bengal
- Country: India
- Ministry: Department of Personnel and Administrative Reforms and e-Governance; Government of West Bengal
- Key people: Mamata Banerjee; P. B. Salim
- Launched: 14 October 2020; 6 years ago
- Status: Active
- Website: bsk.wb.gov.in

Bangla Sahayata Kendra (Bengali: বাংলা সহায়তা কেন্দ্র) is a single-window online platform channeling all state public services for fast delivery to citizens in the Indian state of West Bengal. Additionally, it includes a system of offices spread across the state, where government-appointed data entry operators assist digitally unskilled people in availing of public services free of cost.

The provision aims at supporting citizens with digital tools, techniques, and traits to avail of online public services without the involvement of an intermediary, for G2C services. It is a first of its kind G2C service in India. Currently, 3561 BSKs are operational in 23 districts of the state, with a plan of starting 1464 new ones by the end of 2023. More than 1 crore service requests have been served through the BSK centers by the end of 2021.

== Setup ==
Bangla Sahayata Kendra was set up by the government of West Bengal in October 2020, in relation to the National e-Governance Plan. In October 2021, a Programme Management Unit was also constituted for the superintendence, control, and management of BSKs. It includes a governing body comprising ex-officio members of the government and subsequently added ex-officio members from time to time by the governing body, special invitees, and other members from the office of PMU was constituted to govern the Bangla Sahayata Kendras.

Currently, 3561 Bangla Sahayata Kendras (BSKs) are functional and by the end of the year 2023, 1464 new BSKs will be operational across the state. The e-Wallet system is enabled at the BSKs that provides paid online transactional services also at the centres. In addition, the Project Management Unit (PMU) is set up for effectively monitoring and operationalizing of BSK centres across the state. The operation of BSK centres is monitored daily at the state and the district level through a dedicated portal and a team of personnel. The UIDAI-led Aadhaar (Aadhaar Related Services) services at the grassroots level will be an added service provided by the BSKs.

=== Functioning ===
The Bangla Sahayata Kendras (BSKs) work like aggregators at the grassroots level in West Bengal, providing multiple online public services through a single online platform. Currently, 3561 BSKs are functioning from government premises in 23 districts in West Bengal, providing people with information on Schemes, programmes, and initiatives of the state government. This interface offers 280 services for 38 administrative departments (see administrative divisions in West Bengal) - of which 177 are transactional services, and 101 are Information Services. A portal (https://bsk.wb.gov.in/) developed in-house processes all transactions and service deliveries. More services are being added through API for multiple services during the application process, status update, grievance redressal and final certificate or receipts. To transform the BSKs from their current role to more dynamic and citizen service-oriented centres, BSKs now also provide barcoded, digitally signed e-certificates for citizen use. At present various departments issue certificates to the citizens at the district/ block level through government officials.

== Policies and services ==
The BSK initiative is associated with the department of Personnel and Administrative Reforms and e-Governance of the government. It provides several crucial services.

=== Policy initiatives ===
BSKs function like the Common Service Centers (CSC) except that the services provided through BSKs are free of any service charge and are routed through a single window. They integrate all state government mandated departmental services to go online. They provide an additional channel to the departments and citizens for G2C (Government Services) services and serve as centres that physically assist citizens to avail online public services.

An e-wallet system provides the citizen the option to pay to the data entry operator who on behalf of the citizen uses an e-wallet to pay to the department. The e-wallet is then refilled by the data entry operator at the nearest State Bank of India branch. For example: A citizen can pay his electricity bill (WBSEDCL), land mutation charges, department of Urban Development and Municipal Affairs, land registration fees, trade license application fees, road tax of his vehicle (Vahan Seva) and many others from the same window and from the same place. He can also avail his e-ration card (department of Food & Supplies Government of West Bengal), birth and death (department of Health and Family Welfare), disability or backward classes certificates (Backward Classes Welfare Department) all from the same online window assisted by the data entry operators, free of cost.

The BSKs are present at the gram panchayat levels and make it easier for the people at the grassroots to have access to government services.

=== Services ===
Services under the initiative include:

- Kanyashree Prakalpa (improving the status and wellbeing of girls)
- Rapashree Prakalpa
- Swasthya Sathi Prakalpa (universal health coverage scheme providing basic health cover up to Rs. 5 lakh per annum per family)
- Sabooj Sathi
- Krishak Bandhi Prakalpa (assured and continuous income and insurance coverage to farmers)
- Gatidhara (scheme for employment of registered unemployed youth in the transport sector)
- Yuvashree (financial assistance scheme to provide employment assistance to the unemployed youth of West Bengal)
- E-ration card
- e-Parimap (from the department of Legal Metrology, Government of West Bengal)
- Birth and death certificates
