= E-Sampark =

e-Sampark
- Country: India
- Ministry: Ministry of Communications and Information Technology
- Status: Active
- Website: sampark.gov.in

e-Sampark is a mechanism used by the Government of India to contact citizens electronically and is a part of the Digital India campaign. The name is derived from the Hindi word sampark meaning contact.

The main features are:

- sending informational and public service messages via e-mails, SMSs and outbound dialing
- usage of the customised user lists
- SMSs can be sent via the smartphone application
- option to subscribe to the e-Sampark database by individuals, etc.

== See also ==
- Digital India
- Digital literacy
- National e-Governance Plan
