= NIC Haryana State Centre =

Agency in Indian state

State centre of a central government organisation overview
- Formed: 1988
- Jurisdiction: Haryana
- Headquarters: Chandigarh, India
- Parent department: Ministry of Electronics and Information Technology
- Parent State centre of a central government organisation: National Informatics Centre
- Website: nicharyana.nic.in

The NIC Haryana State Centre (NIC-HrSC) is the state-level unit of the National Informatics Centre (NIC) in Haryana, India. Based in Chandigarh, it provides information and communication technology (ICT) services to the Government of Haryana and acts as the technology partner of the state's line departments and its Secretariat for Information Technology. It works through a network of district centres, one for each district of the state, and has been involved in a number of state e-governance projects, including the SARAL citizen-services portal.

== Background ==
The National Informatics Centre was set up by the Government of India in 1976 as a priority project to bring computer-based information systems and decision support into central ministries and departments. It later received financial assistance from the United Nations Development Programme. Over time its role widened from supporting the central government to providing network and e-governance support to state governments, union territory administrations and district administrations. NIC is part of the Ministry of Electronics and Information Technology.

State centres are the link between this national organisation and individual state governments. Each is headed by a State Informatics Officer (SIO) and is responsible for ICT work in its state, while district centres extend that support to district administrations.

== History ==
According to an NIC house publication, NIC Haryana was established in 1988 at the Haryana Civil Secretariat, with offices in every district of the state, in order to spread the use of ICT across Haryana. District-level accounts from the same publication agree on the date for individual districts: the NIC district centres at Hisar and Sirsa are each described as having been established in 1988.

Since then the centre's work has grown with the national push towards digital government. In the 2000s this included state-level components of the National e-Governance Plan, such as the State Wide Area Network and the e-District project (see below).

== Offices ==
The state centre operates from three locations in Chandigarh:

- Haryana New Secretariat, Sector 17
- Haryana Civil Secretariat, Sector 1
- NIC centre at the Punjab and Haryana High Court

== Role and functions ==
The centre describes its work as providing value-added ICT services and implementing ICT initiatives and e-governance projects in Haryana, and helping line departments with technical aspects of their projects. The services it lists are:

- Software development
- Web services
- Networking infrastructure (NICNET)
- Data centre and video-conferencing studios
- Network support to all districts and to central and state government offices
- Geographical information systems
- Technical consultancy
- Technical support for implementation of projects

NIC publications also describe a state data centre with cloud infrastructure at NIC Haryana, and redundant 10 Gbps NICNET/National Knowledge Network connectivity for state government offices.

== Governance and administrative role ==
=== Relationship with state departments ===
The state centre serves as a technical partner for the departments of the Government of Haryana and for the state's Secretariat for Information Technology. In practice, this means a department that wants to digitise a service, set up a portal or connect its offices to the state network typically works with NIC staff on design, development, hosting and support. The centre states that its documentation of e-governance work and its dealings with national award juries and survey teams have helped Haryana receive a number of national awards.

=== Relationship with districts ===
Each district centre is led by a District Informatics Officer (DIO), who heads the NIC team in the district. The district page of the state centre lists, for most districts, a DIO together with one or more district informatics assistants. The role of the DIO in a district includes implementing and managing e-governance projects, supporting district administration and departments technically, maintaining district websites and digital platforms, and keeping the district administration's ICT infrastructure secure and working. District centres are connected to the state unit through NICNET and the State Wide Area Network (SWAN); the Kurukshetra centre, for example, was described as having dedicated redundant leased-line connectivity to the NIC Haryana State Unit.

=== Alignment with Haryana's digital initiatives ===
==== SARAL ====
SARAL (Simple, All Inclusive, Real Time, Action Oriented, Long lasting) is the Government of Haryana's portal for delivering and tracking government-to-citizen services. It is built on the Service Plus framework and, according to the state government, covers more than 545 services and schemes of 44 departments, boards and corporations. Citizens can track the status of applications online and by SMS. In October 2021, NIC Haryana received a gold award at NIC's national-level projects awards for onboarding the highest number of citizen services (more than 550 services of 42 departments) on the SARAL (Service Plus) platform. NIC publications also state that applications are processed through SARAL Kendras (citizen service centres) and common service centres across the state.

==== e-District ====
e-District is a mission mode project under the National e-Governance Plan that delivers district-level services electronically. A 2011 news report said Haryana had implemented it as a pilot with four services: income certificates, caste certificates, domicile certificates and grievances. A NIC account of the district centre in Jind describes the SARAL single-window system there as operating as a module of e-District.

==== State Wide Area Network ====
The Haryana State Wide Area Network (SWAN) is the state government's data network, set up under the National e-Governance Plan. A 2011 report stated that about 1,400 government offices of various departments had been linked through it. A 2020 NIC publication states that SWAN in Haryana has been integrated with the National Knowledge Network at the district level.

==== Websites ====
NIC Haryana has moved all 22 district websites to NIC's Secure, Scalable and Sugamya Website as a Service (S3WaaS) platform and signed a memorandum of understanding with the state government for state departmental websites. The Kurukshetra district website won a Platinum award as the best district website in the country in 2018, and NIC Haryana received a gold award for its implementation of S3WaaS in 2021.

== NIC District Centres ==
The state centre's website lists 22 district centres as of October 2026. Most are housed in the district's Mini Secretariat or Deputy Commissioner's office. The entries below are in alphabetical order; where published NIC material describes a district's work, a short note is included.

- Ambala – The district centre is at the Mini Secretariat, Ambala City. The district's DIO role is described in a National e-Governance Division directory entry.
- Bhiwani – Located at the Mini Secretariat, with a DIO and an assistant.
- Charkhi Dadri – Located in the Mini Secretariat, Charkhi Dadri; it appears as "Charki Dadri" on the state centre's list.
- Faridabad – Located at the Mini Secretariat in Sector 12.
- Fatehabad – Located at the Mini Secretariat, with a DIO and a district informatics assistant.
- Gurugram – Listed as "Gurgaon" on the state centre's page.
- Hisar – Established in 1988, the district centre has been described as central to e-governance work in the district, including the district website and e-District services. A 2021 article credits it with a web portal for COVID-19 call centres, mapping of COVID hospitals and care centres, and the "Connect Plus Haryana" district governance mobile app, which won a silver award.
- Jhajjar – Located at the Mini Secretariat.
- Jind – The district centre has implemented the SARAL single-window system in the district, which is described as a module of e-District.
- Kaithal – Located in the SARAL Kendra building at the Mini Secretariat.
- Karnal – Located at the Mini Secretariat in Sector 12.
- Kurukshetra – A 2011 account describes e-DISHA centres, HALRIS centres, a training lab and a video-conferencing room supported by the district centre, which was linked to the state unit through NICNET and SWAN. The district's website received a national Platinum award in 2018.
- Mewat – Listed under this name, with its office at the Mini Secretariat in Nuh.
- Narnaul – Listed under the town name; located at the Mini Secretariat, Narnaul.
- Palwal – Located at the Mini Secretariat in the deputy commissioner's office.
- Panchkula – Located at the New Mini Secretariat, Sector 1.
- Panipat – Located at the District Secretariat.
- Rewari – Located at the Mini Secretariat.
- Rohtak – Located at the Mini Secretariat.
- Sirsa – Established in 1988; a 2014 account lists e-Disha centres, Jamabandi Nakal issuance centres, an e-Aadhaar centre, e-tendering and property registration among the ICT initiatives in the district.
- Sonipat – Listed with a DIO and an assistant.
- Yamunanagar – Located at the Mini Secretariat in Jagadhri.

== Recognition ==
NIC Haryana has received awards for its work on state and national projects. In October 2021 it received two gold awards for best implementation of national-level projects in Haryana: one for S3WaaS and one for SARAL.

== See also ==
- National Informatics Centre
- National e-Governance Plan
- E-Government
- Digital India
- Ministry of Electronics and Information Technology
- National Knowledge Network
- Haryana
- List of districts of Haryana
- Chandigarh
