= Swachh Dhan Abhiyan =

- स्वच्छ धन अभियान
- Country: India
- Prime Minister(s): Narendra Modi
- Ministry: Ministry of Finance (India)
- Launched: 31 January 2017; 9 years ago New Delhi
- Status: active

Swachh Dhan Abhiyan (English: Operation Clean Money) is a project launched by Income Tax Department, Ministry of Finance, Government of India on 31 January 2017 in New Delhi. It has a programming software which is being used to get answers on all the deposits made and after preliminary answers from the people.

It is inspired by Swachh Bharat Abhiyan, an initiative to Clean India. Swachh Dhan Abhiyan is about Clean Money, a reflection of the government's anti-corruption drive.

== See also ==
- Indian black money
- 2016 Indian banknote demonetisation
- Corruption in India
- MyGov.in
