= Sadhvi Bhagawati Saraswati =

Spiritual leader

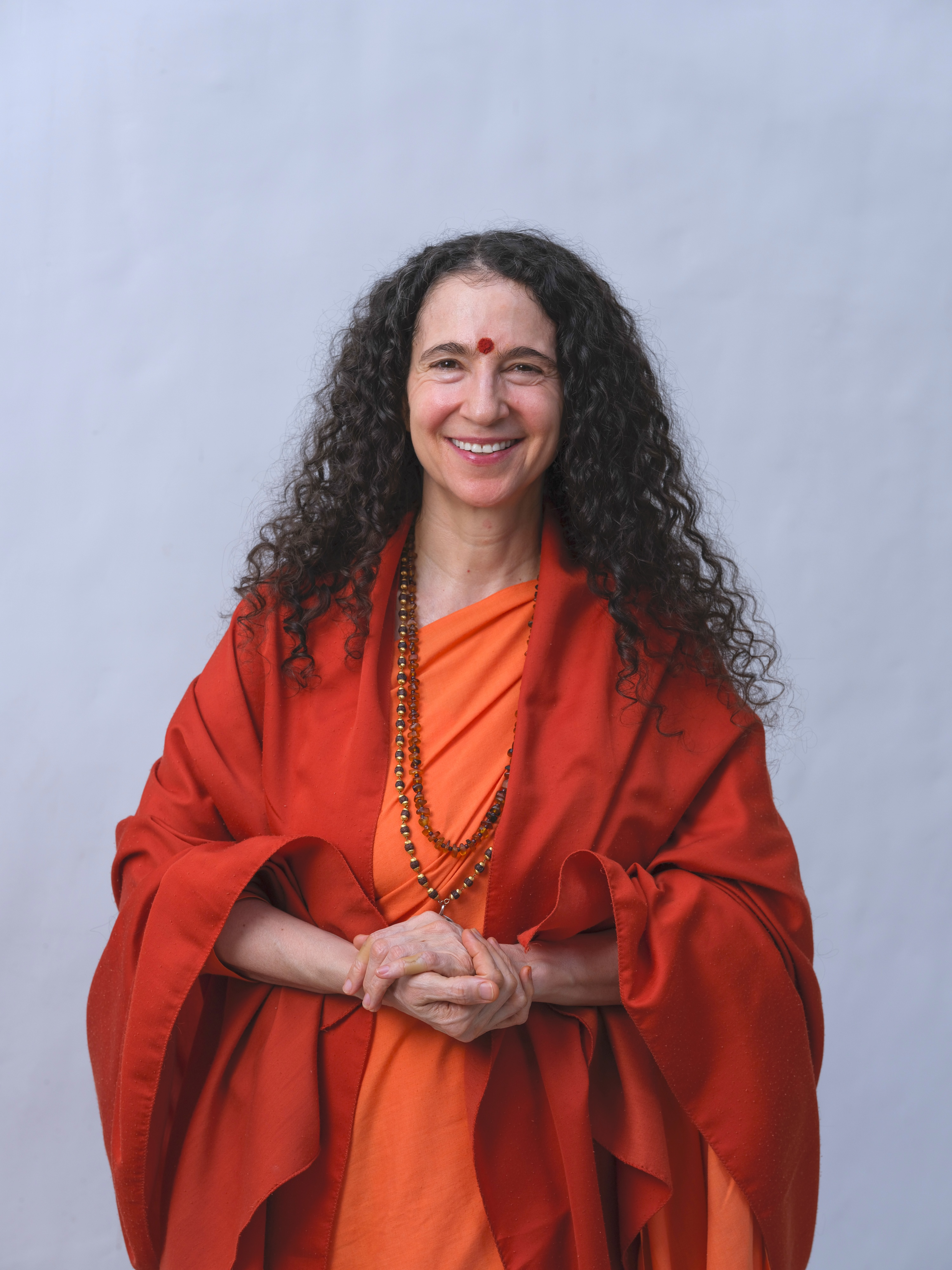
- Born: 14 March 1971 (age 55)
- Education: Stanford University
- Organization: Parmarth Niketan
- Website: http://sadhviji.org

Sadhvi Bhagawati Saraswati (born 14 March 1971) is an spiritual leader and motivational speaker, based in Parmarth Niketan, Rishikesh, India. Sadhviji (as she is popularly known) is the author of the memoirs Hollywood to the Himalayas: A Journey of Healing and Transformation, By God's Grace and Come Home to Yourself

== Early life and education ==
Sadhviji was born in a Jewish family and grew up in Los Angeles, California, and graduated from Stanford University with a bachelor's degree in Psychology. She then continued her studies at Pacific Graduate School of Psychology (PGSP) and the University for Integrative Learning. She earned a PhD in Pediatric Neuropsychology

In 1996, Sadhviji first traveled to Rishikesh, India, where she visited the Parmarth Niketan Ashram. After returning to the United States to continue her doctoral studies, she moved permanently to the ashram in April 1997. She was officially ordained into the order of Sanyas (monastic vows) by her guru Swami Chidanand Saraswati on 11 June 2000.

Sadhviji teaches meditation, leads daily satsang, gives spiritual discourses, provides counseling and oversees charitable and humanitarian projects and activities.

== Work ==
Sadhviji serves as the International Director of Parmarth Niketan and is the director of the annual International Yoga Festival. Her leadership roles include serving as Secretary-General of the Global Interfaith WASH Alliance (GIWA) and President of the Divine Shakti Foundation, an organization focused on the empowerment and education of women.

Internationally, she represents spiritual and humanitarian interests on the United Nations Advisory Council on Religion and within the G20 Interfaith Forum. She was also the Managing Editor of the Encyclopedia of Hinduism, a comprehensive project compiled by the India Heritage Research Foundation.

== Awards & recognition ==
- Lifetime Achievement Award (2021) from United States President Joe Biden for volunteer service.
- Bharat ki Laxmi Award (2019), presented by the Hon'ble Prime Minister of India, Shri Narendra Modi
- Honorary Doctor of Philosophy Degree (2018) Awarded by Jharkhand Rai University for her leadership and contributions to spirituality and service.
- National Bharat Gaurav (Pride of India) Award (2017) Awarded for excellence and service in the field of yoga.
