= Tele-law programme =

Legal programme by the Indian government

The tele-law programme (also referred to as tele-law scheme, or tele-law initiative) is a legal program by the Indian government launched in 2017 via the Common Service Centres. The programme connects the disadvantaged people in India requiring legal advice from panel lawyers through an e-interface platform.

== Background ==
The initiative was launched by then Union Law Minister, Ravi Shankar Prasad on 6 June 2017. The program was an initiative by Ministry of Law and Justice in collaboration with the Ministry of Electronics and Information Technology to address cases at pre–litigation stage especially for the marginalized and disadvantaged.

== Process ==
Under the scheme, trained para legal volunteers taught residents of rural areas how to reach legal experts via video conferencing. Para legal volunteers are also responsible to help track the progress of the applicants' cases and grievances and maintain a record. Legal aid is offered through lawyers with the State Legal Services Authorities (SALSA) and Common Services Center.

Section 12 of Legal Services Authority Act, 1987 makes the service free of charge to women, children, victims of trafficking, physically disabled, mentally-ill, victims of natural disaster/ethnic violence, unorganised sector workers, low income earners, people under trial or in custody.

== Cases covered ==
The program offer pre–litigation stage legal aid to issues related to the following cases

- dowry
- family disputes
- divorce
- protection from domestic violence
- sexual harassment
- violence against Scheduled Castes, Scheduled Tribes members
- maintenance of senior citizens,
- rights regarding land and property
- equal wages for men and women
- maternity benefits and prevention of foeticide
- prohibition of child marriage
- cases covered under POCSO (Protection of Children from Sexual Offences Act), POSH (The Sexual Harassment of Women at Workplace (Prevention, Prohibition and Redressal) Act, 2013,
- process of lodging an FIR

== Growth and impact ==
On October 30, 2020 with Tele-law had reached 4 Lakh beneficiaries. By March 2021, Tele-law was operational 285 districts (including 115 aspirational districts) across 27 states. The justice department announced in July 2021 that the Tele-Law program had grown by 369% in number of beneficiaries seeking legal advice from July 2020 having crossed 9 lakh beneficiaries. As of July 2021 the tele-law programme operated in 633 districts (including 115 aspirational districts) across all the States and Union Territories in India using a network of 50,000 CSCs.
