= Digital India Awards =

Indian Awards

- Type: National civilian
- Country: India
- Presented by: Ministry of Electronics and Information Technology
- Established: 2009; 17 years ago
- First award: 2009
- Final award: 2022
- Website: digitalindiaawards.india.gov.in

The Digital India Awards, formerly called the Web Ratna Awards, is a category of award constituted by Ministry of Electronics and Information Technology to acknowledge exemplary initiatives of various states in the realm of e-governance. After 2014, it was renamed to Digital India Awards.

== Awardees ==
- 2012: Kerala Chief Minister's Website, Gold Medal, Excellence in e-Governance. Received by Jogie George Jacob (APS to CM) & P.T Chacko (Press Secretary to CM)
- 2016: National Crime Records Bureau, Silver Medal, Open Championship
- 2016: Citizen COP, best user-friendly mobile application
- 2016: Coimbatore Municipal Corporation, Silver Award, Most Innovative Citizen Engagement.
- 2017: Rashtriya e-Market Services, Gems of Digital India for Excellence in Digital Governance
- 2020: e-Committee of the Supreme Court of India, Platinum Award, Excellence in Digital Governance
