= India.gov.in =

Web portal of the Indian government

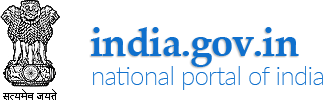
- Website type: National government portal
- Available in: English, Hindi
- Owners: Indian government, and private.
- Website: india.gov.in इंडिया.सरकार.भारत
- Commercial: No
- Registration: Not required
- Launched: 10 November 2005; 20 years ago
- Current status: Active

india.gov.in, also known as the National Portal of India. is the official web portal of India. It presents information resources and online services from government sources, accessible from a single point.

It is the official portal of the Indian Government, designed, developed and hosted by National Informatics Centre (NIC), an S&T Organisation of the government of India under the aegis of the Department of Electronics and Information Technology, Ministry of Communications & Information Technology.

The portal has been developed as a Mission Mode Project under the National E-Governance Plan of the government. The objective is to provide a single window access to the information and services such as passport, driving licenses, company registration etc. being provided by the Indian government for the citizens and other stakeholders.

India.gov.in has sections for people living abroad, business persons, government employees, senior citizens and children. The portal is also useful to foreign citizen and researchers searching for information on India. It provides details of the people occupying high offices in India, the work completed by ministries, press releases, demographics, tourism, and cultural heritage.

India.gov.in links to Union, State, District and local level official websites and is the most comprehensive portal about the government of India with links to 6,700 government websites. The website also has a feature that customizes the content displayed, based on a user’s individual profile and preferences. It is accessible by disabled people and users of handheld devices.

The portal has an average of around eight lakh (8,00,000) website visitors per month. While most of these visitors are from India, around 28 per cent come from outside India.

== History ==
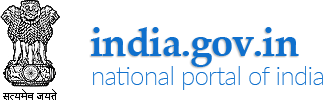
Old Logo used in the website

India.gov.in was launched on 10 November 2005. It is a Mission Mode Project under the National E-Governance Plan or NeGP. The portal is managed by the National Informatics Centre, which operates under the Ministry of Communications and Information Technology.

There were four phases during the creation of the portal:

- Phase 1 was the initiation of the portal with work on conceptualization, the blueprint, and creating the technology architecture,
- Phase 2 was the launch of the first version of the portal, which comprised existing information that was repackaged and presented in a citizen-friendly manner,
- Phase 3 was infrastructure set up, which included the launch of the Hindi version of the portal, content personalization features, and the introduction of a Content Management System,
- Phase 4 made the content universally accessible, W3C compliant, and provided integration of the portal interface with online services already provided by other government departments.

== Content ==
India.gov.in provides website visitors with content presented in a user-friendly format, with access to more than 5000 services.

Details of the major sections of the portal:

Government provides details about people holding portfolios in the legislature, executive, judiciary, and defence forces of India. It has information about the constitution, parliament, acts, rules, regulations, and schemes of the government. It has a place where government employees can see facts about recruitment, training, pension, housing, and related topics. The section provides a searchable contact directory, a database of government websites.

Citizen has information on issues for Indian citizens. It includes information on topics like health, agriculture, education, employment, housing, senior citizens, law, tourism, banking, and taxes. Each segment provides information on schemes, facilities, and FAQs, in addition to tips and links to Government resources.

Overseas is for non-resident Indians, persons of Indian origin, and foreign nationals. The section is a handbook for people wishing to visit or study in India. It has information on passports, visas, customs rules, travel advisories, embassies, educational courses, and travel. The segment on the Indian diaspora talks about schemes, awards, and events available and a list of commonly asked questions.

Sectors offers an overview of the work being done by development sectors and their units. These are the Ministry of Agriculture; Water Resources; Finance; Commerce and Industry; Communications and Information Technology; Consumer Affairs, Food and Public Distribution; Defence; Education; Rural Development; Transport; Science and Technology; Health and Family Welfare; and Environment and Forests.

Directories is a link repository of web links which link to official websites/web-pages of the states and union territories. It consists of links to Union Government bodies, state and union territories departments and bodies, legislature to judiciary. It includes telephone numbers listed by state, with STD, ISD, and PIN codes.

Documents has documents and reports released or published by the Indian Government at the Central or State level.

Forms is a resource for application forms of central/state/UT governments for services, certificates, and licences.

Acts. The Indiacode Textbase contains the sections, schedules, short title, enactment date, and footnotes in every act. The Statement of Objects and Reasons, Table of Contents, or the status of an act can be retrieved through INCODIS. Through INCODIS, users look up the acts or amendments provided they know either the act year, act number, section number, schedule number, or some keywords included in the act.

Rules includes important rules passed by parliament and the State Legislative Assemblies as well as the subordinate legislations issued by the departments.

Schemes is where the government announces welfare schemes. The schemes could be either central, state-specific, or a joint collaboration between the centre and the states.

Tenders takes a visitor to the sub-site www.tenders.gov.in, a portal for tenders published by Indian government departments, public sector units, public sector banks, state government departments, and other government organisations.

Know India offers the heritage, history, culture, geography, politics, and demographics of the country. It introduces the nation’s national symbols, states, Union Territories, districts, and national holidays. The Kids Corner and My India My Pride segments of the section educate citizens about the legacy of the country. My India My Pride is a segment which has the President's Address to the nation, Republic Day Webcast, poems on India, and a photo archive of republic day celebrations. There is a listing of awardees of Bharat Ratna, Param Vir Chakra, Padma Awards, Gallantry Awards, Bravery Awards, Correctional Service Medal Awards, Police Medal for Gallantry, and Meritorious Service Awards.

Business Section is a microsite for business information at business.gov.in. Also known as the Business Portal of India, this section provides a guide for entrepreneurs and content on doing business in India. The website links to business-related online services, provides forms of government departments, and connects business-related government websites.

Current Information is a source of live webcasts of National events such as the Republic Day Parade and the Union budget of India. It provides a feed of news articles from Doordarshan, offers press releases sourced from the Press Information Bureau, and a list of announcements contributed by central and state departments.

How Do I provides information and links to citizen services provided by the central and state/UT governments in India.

Spotlight is a monthly feature that highlights an online service, scheme, or event of the Government, which may be of significance to citizens.

Peoples Group gives information on groups such as Defence and Paramilitary personnel, Indian diaspora, students, entrepreneurs, The Eco Warriors, kids, job seekers, government employees, rural Indian, differently-abled, importers and exporters, senior citizens, and Nagar Palikas.

Newsletter. At the beginning of every month, India.gov.in sends out a newsletter detailing the new offerings of the portal and providing a summary of the latest publications, websites, and press releases. Special newsletters are brought out to promote events like New Year’s Day and the Web Ratna Awards.

NGO Partnership System is a microsite that provides a platform for social networking amongst Non Governmental Organizations (NGO) and other voluntary organizations doing social work and promoting causes in India. It enables them to apply online for grants against government schemes.

CIC Online is a microsite that provides a platform for the citizen of India to lodge an online complaint and/or appeal under the RTI Act to the Central Information Commission, an adjudicatory body for the Public Authorities under the government of India. It enables them to check the status of the petition online using the Unique Identification Number. The site is compliant with WCAG 2.0 Level AA.

E-Greetings has e-greetings for Indian festivals and national holidays. It has e-cards on monuments, culture, natural beauty, and villages of the country.

== Features ==
The Hindi Language Portal gives the content of India.gov.in in Hindi under india.gov.in/hi.

Content Depository is a storehouse of documents, forms, contact directories, schemes, acts, rules and websites contributed by government Ministries and Departments at the central and state level. The contribution of such content is facilitated by a Content Management System(CMS).

Accessibility options - English and Hindi versions of the portal are accessible to visitors irrespective of any disability they may have or difference in the device or technology they are using. Such features, like descriptive text for links and images, keyboard browsing and ability to change text size enable better readability in screen readers, magnifiers and mobile phones.

Standardization. The portal adheres to the ‘Guidelines for Indian Government Websites’. It is also W3C compliant and is certified as a quality website by the Standardization Testing and Quality Certification (STQC) Directorate. The Scope of Approval of this certificate covers three ISO Standards - ISO 25051:2006 Software Engineering, ISO/IEC 9126-1:2001 Software Engineering and ISO/IEC TR 9126-2:2003 Software Engineering.

Web Ratna awards. India.gov.in has instituted the Web Ratna Awards to recognize exemplary e-governance initiatives in the Government sector. Nominations were invited for six categories from all units of the Indian government at the centre and state level as well as Indian missions abroad.

== Awards ==
India.gov.in and its microsites have won awards:

- CIC Online received the ‘Best Project- G2G/G2C’ award for excellence in the CSI-Nihilent E-Governance Awards 2008-09 at the CSI Annual Convention in Pune (2009)
- The 'Government to Citizens Initiative of the Year' Award, in the eGovernance track, at the e-India Awards, 2009, held at Hyderabad.
- Best Paper Award at the 6th International Conference on E-Governance (ICEG-2008) for its paper titled, 'Stakeholder Empowerment through Participatory Governance: A Case Study'.
- Finalist at the Stockholm Challenge, 2008 (Public Administration Category).
- A paper on Citizen participation in the process of ICT-enabled governance: A Case Study, presented at the 1st International Conference on Electronic Government: A Theory and Practice, Macau, 2007.
- Best System Demonstration Award at the 9th International Digital Government Research Conference in Montreal, Canada, 2008.
- Best e-Content award at the "Manthan Award" 2007, organised by the Digital Empowerment Foundation.
- Silver Icon Award in the Best Website Category at the 10th National E-Governance Conference held at Bhopal.
- ‘Best Project- Technology’ award for excellence in the CSI-Nihilent E-Governance Awards at the CSI Annual Convention in Kolkata (2006)

== See also ==
- MyGov.in
