= E-Office Mission Mode Project =

Indian government digitization project

e-Office

Agency overview
- Parent department: Department of Information Technology of India
- Website: https://eoffice.gov.in/

The e-Office Mission Mode Project is one of the Mission Mode Project under the National e-Governance Plan, Department of Information Technology of India. The project is being implemented by the Department of Administrative Reform and Public Grievances of India (DARPG) to improve efficiency in government process and service delivery mechanisms.

== Features ==
The project aims to improve productivity, quality, resource management, turnaround time and increase transparency by replacing the old manual process with an electronic file system.

The new e-Office system is an integrated file and records management system that allows employees to manage content, search for data internally and collaborate. The file system also enables the electronic movement and the tracking of files, and the archival and retrieval of data. The system is planned to be secure and confidential, automating routine tasks, capable on handling the required workload, with the facility of monitoring work and auto-escalation when there are delays.

The project was launched in 2008 with the expectation of converting the government office into a paperless office within a period of 5 years. The e-Office project, targeted at Central Government offices, is being piloted at e-Governance Division of Department of Information Technology, Training Division of Department of Personnel & Training, Department of Administrative Reforms & Public Grievances.

== Similar initiatives ==
Other governmental projects similar to e-Office that have been launched in the past include iWDMS (Integrated Workflow and Document Management System) and SmartGov.
