= Kapil Kapoor =

Indian philosopher

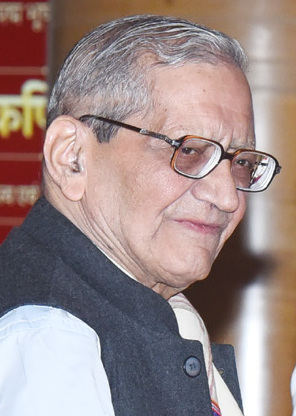
- Kapoor in 2023
- Born: 17 November 1940 (age 85) Amritsar, Punjab Province, India
- Notable awards: Padma Bhushan (2023)

Kapil Kapoor (born 17 November 1940) is an Indian scholar of History linguistics and literature and an authority on Indian intellectual traditions. He is former Pro-Vice-Chancellor of Jawaharlal Nehru University (JNU) and served as professor at the Centre for Linguistics and English, and at the Centre for Sanskrit Studies there before retiring in 2005. He is Editor-in-Chief of the 11-Volume Encyclopedia of Hinduism published by Rupa & Co. in 2012.

The Government of India awarded him with the civilian honour of Padma Bhushan in 2023.

== Family ==
Prof. Kapil Kapoor was born in Amritsar, Punjab Province India. Prof. Kapoor's family came from Lyallpur, Punjab Province, in modern-day Pakistan, at the time of Partition of India and Pakistan. His family were allotted land in Phagwara city in Kapurthala district of Punjab.

== Career ==
Kapil Kapoor has been teaching for fifty-two years; 41 scholars worked for PhD and 36 for M.Phil. under him. He was Dean of the School of Language, Literature and Culture Studies, JNU, from 1996–1999 and Rector (Pro-Vice-Chancellor) of the University from 1999–2002.

In 2018, he was appointed chairperson of Indian Institute of Advanced Study (IIAS) at Shimla. Previously, he was Chancellor of Mahatma Gandhi Antarrashtriya Hindi Vishwavidyalaya at Wardha.

His teaching and research areas include literary and linguistic theories, both Indian and Western, the philosophy of language, nineteenth-century British life, literature and thought and Indian intellectual traditions. He has written and lectured extensively on these themes. He was instrumental in the establishment of the Center for Sanskrit Studies and, later, the School of Sanskrit and Indic Studies at JNU. Though he retired from JNU in 2005, he continued his academic career.

== Books published ==
- Semantic Structure and the Verb: A Propositional Analysis, 1985, New Delhi: Intellectual Publishers.
- Grading Criteria for Neo-Literate Materials (Co-author, Prof. Mushtaque Ahmad), 1987, New Delhi: Jamia University Press.
- English in India, ed. (Co-editor, Dr. R. S. Gupta), 1991, New Delhi: Academic Foundation.
- Language, Linguistics and Literature: The Indian Perspective, 1994, New Delhi: Academic Foundation.
- South-Asian Love Poetry, ed. (Co-editor, Dr. S. K. Sareen),1994, New Delhi: Affiliated East-West Press.
- Canonical Texts of English Literary Criticism with Selections from Classical Poeticians, ed. (Co-editor, Mrs. Ranga Kapoor), 1995, New Delhi: Academic Foundation.
- Literary Theory: Indian Conceptual Framework (with glossary in collaboration with Nalini M. Ratnam), 1998 New Delhi: Affiliated East-West Press.
- Dimensions of Panini Grammar, 2005, DK Print World, New Delhi.
- Text and Interpretation. The Indian Tradition, 2005, DK Print World, New Delhi.
- Indian Knowledge Systems, Edited (A.K.Singh, Co-editor), 2005, DK Print World, New Delhi.
- Sanskrit Studies, Vol.1., (ed.) Journal of the Centre of Sanskrit Studies, JNU, New Delhi. 2005 DK Print World, New Delhi.
- Rati Bhakti: Bharat Ki Katha Parampara Me. [Hindi], 2011, Daya Publishing House, New Delhi.
- Encyclopedia of Hinduism Vols.1–11, Editor-in-Chief, 2012, Rupa & Co.

== Books under publication ==
Two of his books, Abhinavagupta: Manuscripts and Irish-Indian Anthology (with Professors Welch and Mac Mathuna of the University of Ulster, UK, as co-editors) are under publication. Another book Concept and Taxonomy of Knowledge in History of Science, Culture and Civilization, D.P.Chattopadhyaya, General Editor, in the Volume edited by Professor G.C.Pande is also under publication as of February 2013. Kapoor is also working on Encyclopedia of Indian Poetics, as Chief Editor, under a Sahitya Akademi Project.

== Monographs ==
- Indian Tradition of Language Studies and Contemporary Relevance. Anand: HM Patel Institute of English, Sardar Patel University, Vallabh Vidyanagar, 1998.
- Knowledge, Individual and Society in Indian Traditions. Chandigarh: Saini Memorial Foundation Lecture, Panjab University, 2002.
