= Central Excise Mission Mode Project =

Indian government project

The Automation of Central Excise and Service Tax (ACES) is a Mission Mode Project under the National e-Governance Plan being implemented by the Central Board of Excise and Customs (CBEC) in India. It is targeted at the 20,000 users of the CBEC in 245 cities across India and seeks to automate the processes of CBEC along with providing e-services to the users both online and through facilitation centres.

== Services ==
In order to achieve its objective, areas that needed immediate attention were prioritized and following facilities have been provided to the taxpayers under ACES:

- Online Registration of Central Excise Assessees and online amendment
- Online Registration of Service Tax Assesses and online amendment
- Electronic filing of Central Excise Returns
- Electronic filing of Service Tax Returns
- Electronic filing of claims, permissions, intimations submitted by assessees in the course of business with the department.
- Instant E-acknowledgement of documents with a Unique Document Identification Number

== Financials ==
The project is being implemented at a total cost of less than Rs 20 Crores (Indian) from its inception till 2016.
