= Road and Transport Mission Mode Project =

Indian e-governance project

The Road and Transport Mission Mode Project (MMP) is one of the 27 Mission Mode Projects of the National e-Governance Plan in India, a program to centralize governance operations online.

== Services and software ==
Under this project, Road Transport Offices (RTOs) are being computerized throughout India. Data is collected at State Registers, National Registers, and RTOs which are connected and share comprehensive data. Driving license (DL) services online can process applications for new licenses, select dates for driving skills tests, and accept online payments for license-related fees. Vehicle registration (VR) services include payment of registration related fees, clearance certificates, and ownership transfer.

The project is being implemented by NIC. The software for vehicle registration service is called Sarathi.

and the software for driver's license services is called Sarathi.

Below is the list of services provided under the Sarathi Project:

- Learner Driving Licence
- Driving Licence
- Conductor Licence
- Driving School License
- Appointment for Dl related
- Documents upload
- DL fee submission
- Application Status
- Search Driving Licence
- Add a class of vehicle
- Withdraw your service
- Change Of Address In Certificate Of Registration Intimation.
- Surrender Of Class Of Vehicle From Licence
- Transfer Of Ownership Of Motor Vehicle Application.
- Transfer Of Ownership Of Motor Vehicle Notice.
- Temporary Registration Of Motor Vehicle Application.
- Grant Of NOC For Certificate Of Registration Application.
- Registration Of Motor Vehicle With A Fully Built Body Application.
- Assignment Of Fresh Registration Mark Of Motor Vehicle Of Diplomatic Officer Application.
- Issue Of Duplicate Certificate Of Registration Application

== Implementation in various state/union territories in India ==
Vahan, the vehicle registration software, has been implemented in 29 States/UTs.

- Jharkhand implemented the vehicle registration software and license software prior to February 2007 in 12 districts including 18 district transport offices and four regional transport offices, helping collect of tax, register vehicles, issue driver and driving school licenses, record the fitness of vehicles, and issue Smart Cards. The Smart Cards replace paper documents, store information, and remove the danger of forged documents.
- Tamil Nadu introduced Vahan and Sarathi in Madurai North RTO on July 28, 2007. The systems generated random vehicle registration numbers, improved operations, and captured data which was also fed into a database in Chennai, the state capital.
- Nagaland started to use Vahan and Sarathi software linked to a single database in July 2008.
- Karnataka made microchip-embedded Smart Cards mandatory in June 2009 costing Rs 200 for the nearly 7.6 million vehicles in the state (June 2009 figures). At that time, the five RTOs in Bangalore, Karnataka had already begun to issue these cards, containing records of the driver and their offenses and to prevent forgery of documents.
- Haryana State computerized the Road Transport Authorities of 13 districts and introduced Vahan and Sarathi as of September 28, 2010.
- Gujarat State introduced the online registration of vehicles through Vahan in Surat on September 29, 2009, reducing the time taken for registration from 15 days down to a few hours.
- Chandigarh's Registering and Licensing Authority of the Union Territory launched the Vahan software in November 2009. It began to issue blue smart cards(registration cards) to speed up the registration process and detect stolen vehicles.
- Arunachal Pradesh, launched the project at Itanagar in December 2009.
- Manipur started using Vahan and Sarathi by February 5, 2010, in 3 districts: Churachandpur, Imphal East, and Imphal West.
- Uttar Pradesh started using Vahan and Sarathi as of June 1, 2011, for maintaining online records of the Transport Department at 73 locations, and the software is replacing paper documents. The transport department has claimed better revenue collection as a result of implementing the software.

== Benefits to citizens ==
An Assessment Study was carried out by market research agencies empanelled by the Ministry of Information Technology to judge the effectiveness of the computerization undertaken in various projects, with the Indian Institute of Management Ahmedabad acting as the technical advisor As per this study, the average number of trips decreased from 3.44 to 2.43, and the waiting time(in minutes) reduced from 130.62 minutes to 98.17 minutes. There was also an average saving of Rs 66 per transaction for 12 states where the survey was conducted(total cost=travel cost per tripXno.of trips+wage loss +proportion paying bribeXaverage bribe amount). The biggest gain in savings was in Madhya Pradesh where the cost per transaction decreased from Rs. 1031.82 to 700.02 with a saving of Rs 331.80. Other states where costs decreased include Haryana, Delhi, Kerala, Orissa, Rajasthan, Uttarakhand, and West Bengal. However, in some states the cost per transaction increased. In Tamil Nadu, the cost per transaction increased, from 296.55 to 376.63 with a total cost increase of Rs 80.08. Other states where cost increased were Himachal Pradesh, Gujarat and Punjab

The National Informatics Centre received an award for this project which was stated to have benefits such as "customer satisfaction" as well as "transparency, efficiency and responsiveness in the system"

The CSI-Nihilent eGovernance Award 2009 to Shahid Bhagat Singh Nanagar, Punjab for its various e-governance projects, mentions that the implementation of VAHAN and SARATHI has resulted in improvement of processes and benefits for citizens

It has also been reported by the press that in Jharkhand, the quality of services has improved with single window clearance and simplification of processes.
