= Mobile Seva =

Agency overview
- Formed: 2011
- Parent department: Department of Electronics and Information Technology
- Website: https://mgov.gov.in/

Mobile Seva is an UN award-winning e-governance initiative by government of India. This programme was launched in 2011, by Department of Electronics and Information Technology, Government of India. This programme includes a Mobile Applications Store that by December, 2013, contained 240 applications available free. The programme takes benefit of ubiquitous mobile phone use all over India, to enable interaction between the Indian government and its citizens.

== Services offered ==
By the end of May, 2014, more than 1000 government bodies from all over India had integrated their services through Mobile Seva, this integration was enabled through various methods such as text messages, mobile applications, Unstructured Supplementary Service Data, and Interactive Voice Response System. The system by May 2014 had delivered 930 million mobile text messages to Indian citizens. 318 "pull based" services were available. The MobileAppStore hosted on the Mobile e-governance Service Delivery Gateway provides 300 mobile applications for 24x7 service. Amongst applications available are those related to tracking of Right to Information, passport applications, status of voters lists, locating of hospitals, police stations, ATMs, post offices, railway stations, hostels, sending of alerts in emergencies, downloading of various statutory documents such as birth, death certificates, pension forms, remote monitoring of health parameters by health professionals, maintenance of health records, processing of loud speaker permits.

== Awards ==
Mobile Seva is second place co-winner of the 2014 United Nations Public Service Awards. This award was won under the category "promoting whole of government approaches in the information age"

== See also ==
- MyGov.in
