= Citizen COP =

CitizenCOP
- Developer: INFOCRATS Web Solutions Pvt. Ltd.
- Release: October 1, 2012; 13 years ago
Stable release
- Android: 4.2.66 / July 20, 2020; 5 years ago
- iOS/iPadOS: 6.6.6 / June 4, 2020; 6 years ago
- Operating system: Android 5.0 or later iOS 10.0 or later iPadOS 10.0 or later
- Type: Personal safety app
- License: Proprietary freeware
- Website: www.citizencop.org

CitizenCOP is a mobile application, developed by the INFOCRATS Web Solutions Pvt. Ltd. and published in October 2012 as freeware. It is developed with the concept to leverage growing use of smart phones for safety of citizens and promote a crime free environment by encouraging voluntary anonymous crime reporting. CitizenCOP app is currently operating in co-ordination of police departments of Bhopal, Indore, Jhansi, Raipur, Noida, Bengaluru and Navi Mumbai. In Raipur, Chief Minister Dr. Raman Singh presided over the launch of CitizenCOP app. For cities where CitizenCOP does not have police association, lite version of the application is working. On 7 March 2016, full version of CitizenCOP was launched in co-ordination of police department of Noida, India. On the occasion of International Women's Day on 8 March 2016, CitizenCOP was launched in Varanasi in co-ordination with the police administration of the city.

== Features ==
CitizenCOP has been bundled with several personal safety and convenience features like /Incident Reporting, SOS Help, Towed Vehicle Search, News and Notifications, GEO Fencing, Police Phone Directory, Report Lost Article, My Safe Zone, etc.

=== Report an Incident ===
This feature is the key feature of the app. It gives each citizen a power to anonymously report crime to police. One needs to go to this option on the menu screen where he can upload images or videos of any incident he is witnessing as an evidence.

=== Help Me (SOS) ===
This function lets the user send a SOS message for instant Help in emergency situations. The user needs to save up to four trusted contacts, who can be alerted through a SOS message sent via the App in case of emergency. On clicking 'Help Me' button, the application sends an auto generated message along with the real-time GEO location of the user. It also reports the same information to police control room to help them initiate quick action.

=== Towed Vehicle Search ===
The police while towing a vehicle registers the pickup location and the location where they drop it. The user can search if their vehicle has been towed using the 'Towed Vehicle Search' option and entering Vehicle License plate number and the date.

=== My Safe Zone ===
The user can set an area on map as a Safe Zone in which he feels secured. Whenever the user crosses the boundary mentioned, a SOS message will automatically be sent to preset contact numbers along with the police officials.

== Awards and recognition ==
On 13 April 2015, CitizenCOP was presented the e-Governance Excellence Award. The award was given under the category Improvement in Citizen Service Delivery/ Governance through use of IT (Private/ Non Govt Sector).

In 2016 CitizenCOP received the Digital India award.
