= Rashtriya e Market Service =

Rashtriya e-Market Services (ReMS) is established as a joint venture of Government of Karnataka (India) and NCDEX spot exchange limited with equal shareholding. It was conceived to blend public interest with the initiative of a private enterprise for establishing, operating, managing a specialized electronic trade system called Unified Market Platform (UMP) for auctioning of farmer's produce. Department of Agricultural Marketing, ReMS and the Markets, work in close coordination to implement the reforms agenda of the State. ReMS has been striving to put in to place the best practices in the agricultural markets like Establishing Assaying facilities, cleaning and grading machinery in markets, capacity building for stakeholders etc.

== History ==
Primary agricultural markets in India are characterized by low efficiency due to fragmented markets, opaque bidding process, information asymmetry, indifference to quality, low transparency in market operations, lack of use of information technology, poor dissemination of market price information and limited competition. Compulsion to sell only in regulated market yards having limited infrastructure, a market loaded against the farmer, monopoly practices, restricted competition among buyers, high transaction cost, considerable post-harvest losses and a host of other unhealthy practices prevail. All these weigh against the farmers, leading to poor price realization.

To restructure the agricultural marketing in the Karnataka state, Government of Karnataka (India) stepped forward and formed Agriculture Market Reforms Committee (AMRC) in 2013 to put out a comprehensive road map for sustainable development of markets.

=== UMP – Unified Market Platform ===
Innovative Market Process Presently, when farmers bring their produce to the nearest market, at market gate their details are entered on UMP and a unique ID is generated for their lots. Thereafter, these lots are displayed in the market yard for e-tender/ auction as per the instructions given by the farmers. The free of cost assaying facility is also provided at the markets, farmers can avail the facility by allowing the assaying staff to take their produce for testing of commodity on standard quality parameters. ReMS has tied up with assaying accreditation agencies for assaying In case of e-tender, assaying of lots is performed and the results are displayed on UMP prior to bidding. Local traders can check the commodity physically from the displayed heaps, whereas remote traders can assess the quality of commodity on UMP through published reports. Bidding slots are provided for all lots and traders submit their bids for interested lots within the stipulated time. Post bidding time, tenders are opened and highest bidder is declared as the winner of respective lot. The winning bid and trader's details are sent through SMS's to the farmer's registered mobile number. Farmer has an option to accept or reject the bid price. Post confirmation by the farmer, lots are weighed by electronic weighing scales and commodity weighed is uploaded on UMP.

UMP has the following functional modules:

- Trading Platform- providing multiple price discovery mechanisms.
- Material accounting- accounts for all transactions taking place in the market.
- Trade fulfillment- completes trade related and all post auction activities.
- Fund management - Clearing and settlement of funds.
- Document management - Documentation and reports as required.

Outcomes

a) Enhanced transparency through transparent price discovery mechanism:

The advanced electronic platform provides efficient price discovery mechanisms, bringing transparency in market operations. It has overcome obstacles such as local cartelization, opaque bidding process, restricted inter-market trade etc.

b) Increased competition with participation of outside traders and bulk-buyers:

Unified trader license issued to traders facilitates trading across the State and remote bidding encourages outside traders and bulk buyers to trade across all markets as one market in Karnataka. This has put barrier for local cartelization and provided healthy competition leading towards better price discovery.

c) Dissemination of real-time price information to farmers allows them to take informed decision:

Real time price information provided by UMP via kiosks, SMS's etc. to farmers, enables them to decide the selling price of produce. This real-time information serves as a bench mark for trade and provides fair chance of bidding for every lot.

d) Enhanced Market Access:

Market linkage through online platform has benefited farmers by creating a conducive growth oriented ecosystem. The stakeholders now have access to all markets of his interest and can trade online with settlement through banks. Real time information of quantity/quality and prices can now be accessed through Kiosks, Mobile Apps, etc. This resulted in participation of traders from neighboring states.

e) Efficient trade mechanism and documentation:

The lots are made available for bidding at assigned bidding slots, being online the trade is performed in minimum time possible. The transaction data is stored in UMP and can be accessed for reconciliation. The Computerized billing provides proper documentation and can be re-printed from Kiosks provided in market yard. Online payment facility to farmer's accounts enable timely payment to farmers account without any deductions from the actual amount.

f) Quality awareness among farmers has increased:

To increase the outside traders’ participation and to facilitate quality-based bidding, ReMS initiated to bring quality analysis of the commodities. Well-equipped quality assaying labs with automated assaying machines were established in 40 APMC's. Free of cost assaying facility has encouraged farmers to opt for assaying of produce and display the report on UMP.

=== Replicability and Adaptability ===
The New market structure was piloted in 3 markets in February 2014 and now extended to 162 markets in Karnataka. Till 31 March 2019, agricultural commodities transacted on the UMP are worth of 145,523 crores of quantity 627 Lakh tons from 153 Lakh farmers lots. E-permit, a centralized permit verification system is in place for all 162 markets of the State allowing stake holders to generate permit "Anytime-Anywhere" from UMP for transportation of Agri-commodities bought from the markets. Karnataka's path-breaking reform in agricultural marketing is acknowledged as the lead player in the country and Government of India is largely adopting the Karnataka model for its National Agricultural market program.

==== Awards & Recognitions ====
- ReMS's Unified Market Platform (UMP), bagged the Commonwealth Association for Public Administration and Management (CAPAM) award in the public service management category at a function held at Georgetown, Guyana, 2018.
- Rashtriya e Market services won Indian Agribusiness Award 2018 in Agro World 2018 organized by Indian Council Of Food and Agriculture
- ReMS has been conferred with "Gems of Digital India Award 2017 for excellence in e-Governance" by Digital India under the Ministry of Electronics & Information Technology.
- ReMS was awarded with the "DL Shah Platinum Award" by the Quality Council of India by the Hon’ble Union Minister of State for Civil Aviation Mr. Jayanth Sinha on August 20, 2016
- ReMS received Certificate of Distinction at "Commonwealth Association of Public Administration and Management" (CAPAM) as a semifinalist in the 2016 International Innovations Awards category of Innovation Incubation.
- Karnataka was acknowledged as model state in the field of agricultural marketing reforms in "National Conference of Agriculture" chaired by Hon’ble Prime Minister held in January 2016, in Sikkim.
- NITI Aayog, analyzed impact of UMP on farmer's income and concluded that farmer's income has increased by 38%.
- Karnataka Model of Market Reforms is role model for the National Agricultural Markets- 26 states ministers and officers visited Hubli in 2015 to study and learn from this model.
