= MyGov.in =

Government platform for Indian citizens

- Logo

- Screenshot of MyGov homepage
- Website type: Citizen engagement platform
- Available in: 12 languages
- List of languages Hindi, English, Assamese, Bengali, Gujarati, Kannada, Malayalam, Marathi, Odia, Punjabi, Tamil, Telugu
- Headquarters: New Delhi, New Delhi, India
- Country of origin: India
- Area served: Worldwide
- Owner: Government of India
- Creator: Ravi Kumar
- Editor: Ravi Kumar
- CEO: Shri Ajit Kumar
- Website: www.mygov.in
- Commercial: No
- Registration: Required (only to participate)
- Users: 648.01 Lakh+
- Launched: 26 July 2014; 12 years ago
- Current status: Active

MyGov(Hindi: मेरी सरकार, romanized: Mērī Sarakāra) is a citizen engagement platform launched by the Government of India on 26-July-2014 to promote the active participation of Indian citizens in their country's governance and development. It is aimed at creating a common platform for Indian citizens to "crowdsource governance ideas from citizens". Its users discuss and contribute to various government projects and plans. It also allows users to upload documents in various formats. The website is hosted and managed by the National Informatics Centre (NIC). Prime Minister Narendra Modi stated that the aim was to reduce the long gap developed between the electorate and the Executive after being elected.

In the first week of August 2014, MyGov received 100,000 registered users, barely two weeks after its initiation. Google became the first multinational firm to collaborate with MyGov. Shortly before his first address to the nation through All India Radio, it was announced that ideas and questions for the prime minister submitted to MyGov may be responded to in subsequent radio addresses. The website also has an associated mobile app.

== Reception ==
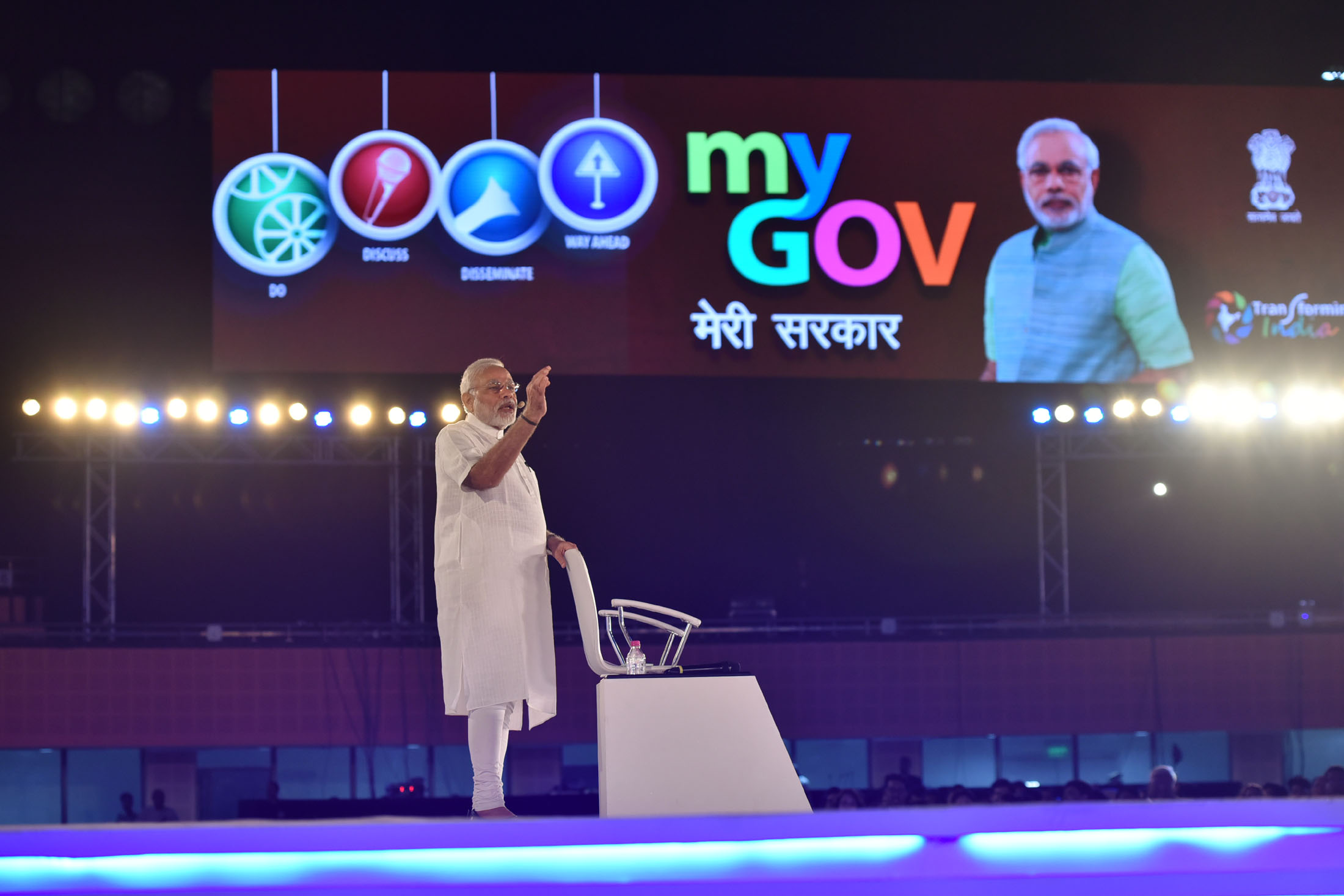
Prime Minister Narendra Modi at the 2nd anniversary celebrations of MyGov, in New Delhi on 6 August 2016

As of the first week of September 2014, within 45 days of its launch, as many as 215,000 users were enrolled at MyGov and more than 28,000 users submitted their ideas on a variety of issues. The format of the Prime Minister's online Independence Day message was extracted from suggestions submitted to MyGov. The platform has attracted many users who were not previously engaged in other social media such as Facebook and Twitter. Within 50 days of its inception, more than 23,000 entries were received for seven different government ministries in addition to the Prime Minister's Office through the 'Creative Corner' section alone.

== Mobile App ==
The MyGov app is developed by the National Informatics Centre that comes under the Ministry of Electronics and Information Technology, Government of India.

== Groups ==
There are various pre-defined groups to which users can selectively subscribe to. The objective of each group is to bring positive changes to the relevant area with people's participation. In each group, users are provided with two domains, 'Do' and 'Discuss'. The 'Do' section includes both online and on-ground tasks to which contributors may assign themselves. The 'discuss' section may be used for discussing different relevant issues affecting the nation. It may also be used for providing vital information regarding the topic and also suggest and propose new ideas. The users are awarded activity points based upon their individual contributions. Users may also volunteer and submit their own entries. These are reviewed by other members, evaluated by experts and approved subsequently. Approved tasks earn credit points.This helps MyGov to serve as a digital library of topics regarding India.

== Open Forum ==
The Open Forum is for discussion of issues of national importance. It spans across various groups and every registered member of MyGov is eligible for participation. Saansad Adarsh Gram Yojana and the new institution which is going to replace the existing Planning Commission of India were the first topics discussed here.

== Mann Ki Baat ==
MyGov is one of the platforms through which citizens can submit input for the monthly Program of the PM called Mann ki Baat broadcast over the radio. Citizens can submit input on the MyGov forum or on the Toll Free Number 1800-11-7800.

== MyGov 2.0 ==
The government's crowdsourcing platform MyGov.in launched its version 2.0, with newer features such as hashtags, polls, interactive discussion forums and social media account integration. The impact assessment of this citizen engagement platform was done by Indian Institute of Public Administration (IIPA), New Delhi.

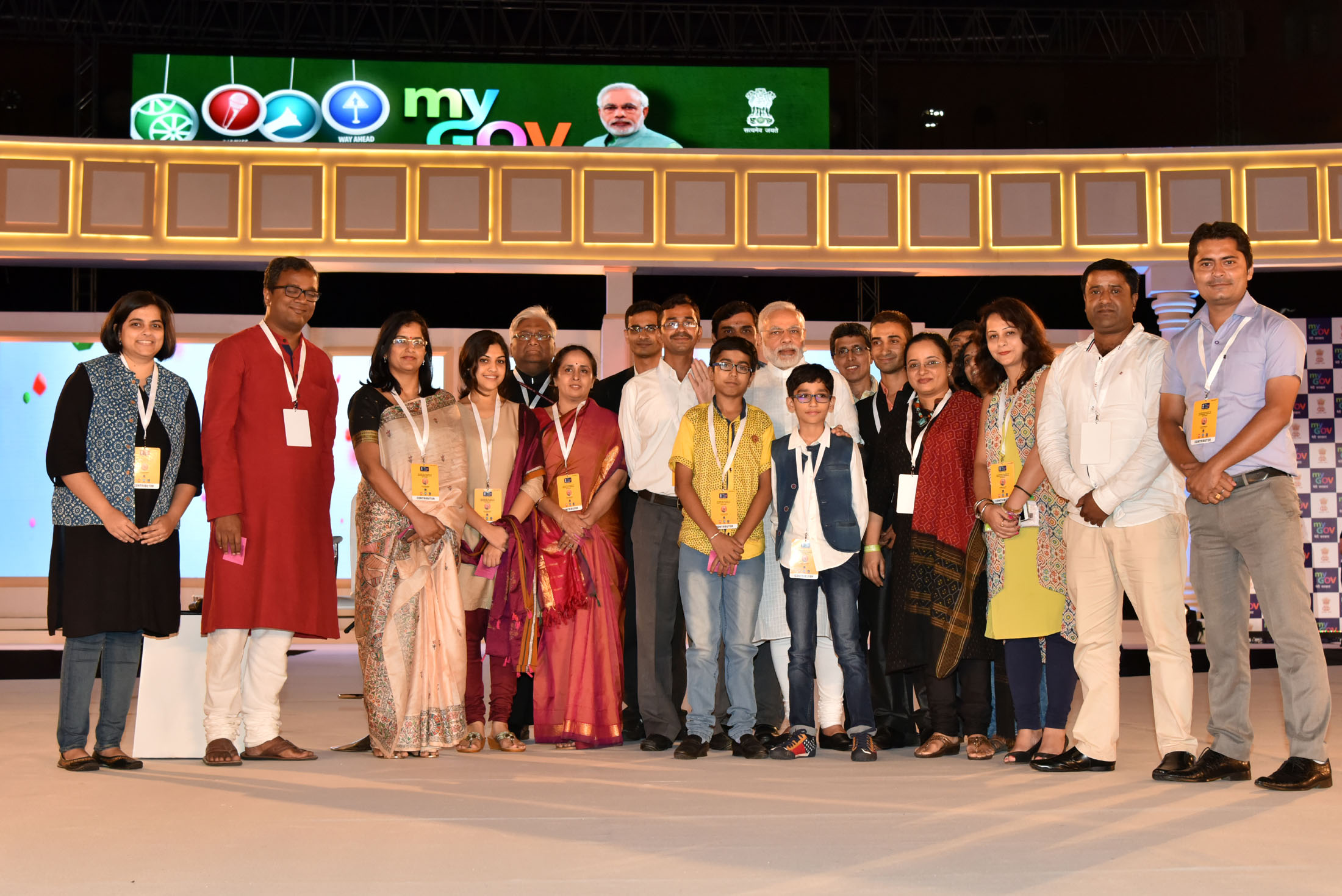
My Gov Contributors

== See also ==
- India.gov.in
- Digital India
- Mobile Seva
- UMANG
- DIGILOCKER
- Swachh Bharat Abhiyan
- Aarogya Setu
