= SmartGov =

SmartGov is a software company based in Cambridge (UK) that aggregates and processes layers of socio-economic data to make the socio-economics of a given location understandable and analyzable.

== History ==
The project behind SmartGov.co was started by Nathan Boublil, Elliott Verreault and Agastya Muthanna at the University of Cambridge in November 2012. Government entities worldwide produce millions of spreadsheets of socio-economic data each year, increasingly released on hundreds of different statistical portals (Open Data). SmartGov develops software technology to automatically aggregate, process, standardize and geolocalize these datasets.

SmartGov incorporated in England and Wales on July 29, 2013, as Stat.io Ltd. The directors listed are Nathan Boublil, Elliott Verreault and Michael Williamson.

== Awards ==
SmartGov won Startup Weekend Cambridge and Silicon Valley comes to the UK (SVC2UK) in November 2012. Google sent the team to San Francisco in January 2013 to present the very first prototype of their technology. SmartGov was also awarded a Certificate of Honour from San Francisco mayor Ed Lee., named best Social Enterprise by Jacques Attali's LH Forum 2013 and best New Financial Technology by NACUE.

SmartGov has received grants from the University of Cambridge, Google, UnLtd, the Royal Society of Arts and the Technology Strategy Board.

On December 9, 2013, it was announced that SmartGov would join the first cohort of Microsoft Ventures in London.
