= Chidanand Saraswati =

Spiritual head of Parmarth Niketan ashram

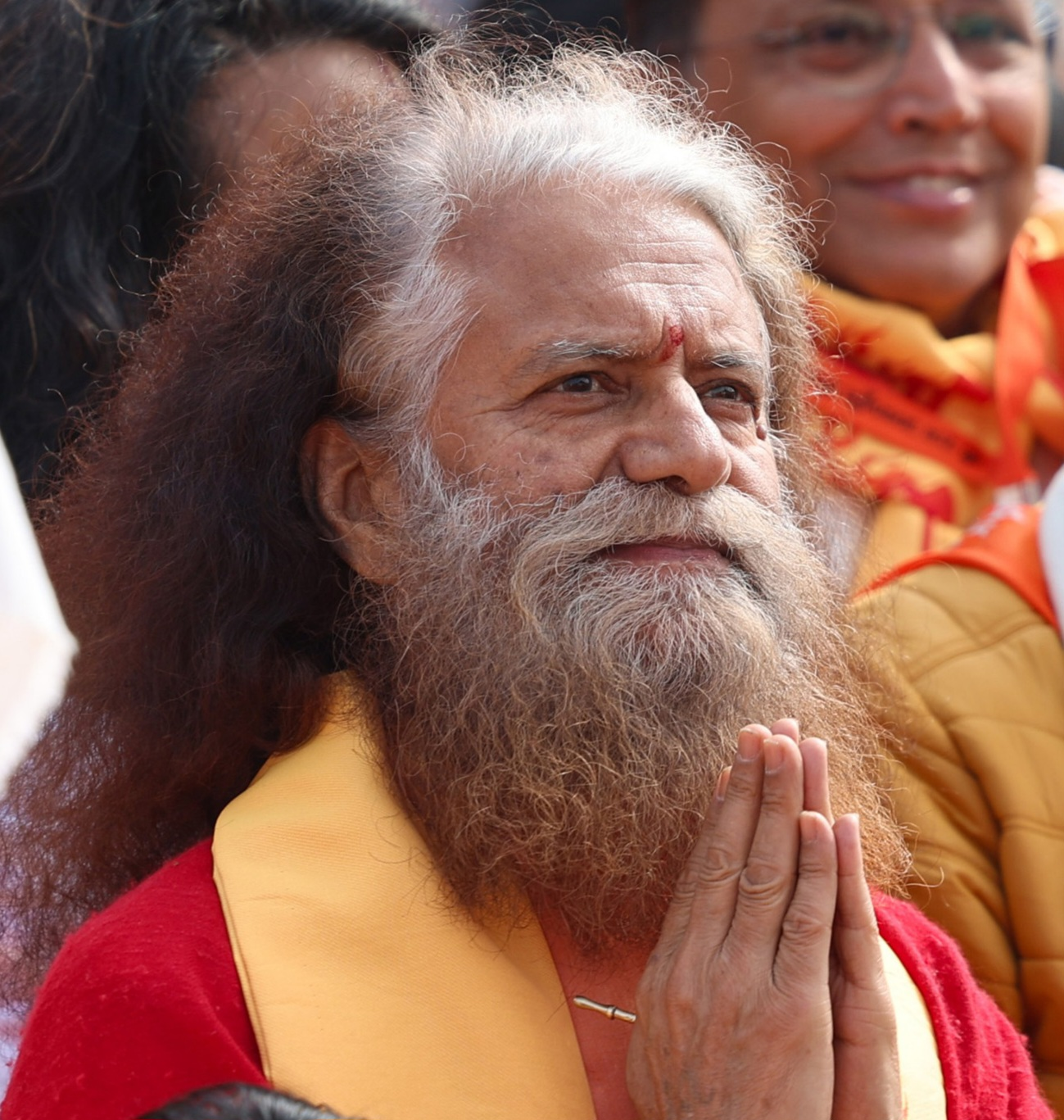

Religious life
- Religion: Hinduism

Chidanand Saraswati is the spiritual head of the Parmarth Niketan Ashram, a spiritual institution based in Rishikesh, India. He is also the founder and spiritual head of the Hindu Jain Temple in Pittsburgh.

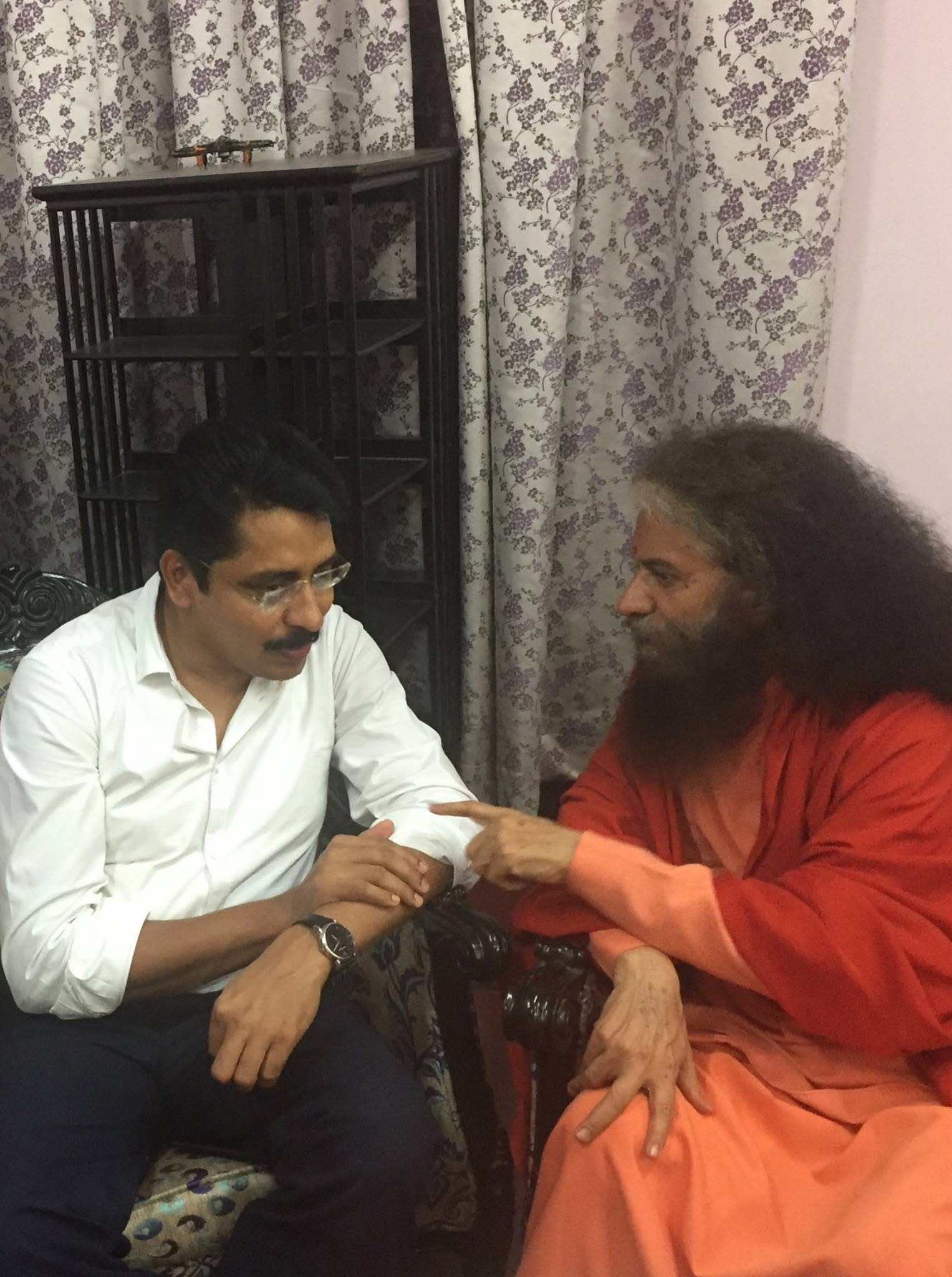
P B Salim IAS with Swami Chidananda Saraswati

== Humanitarian and environmental work ==
Chidanand Saraswati is the founder or co-founder of several humanitarian and environmental organizations which serve a number of causes, including: Ganga Action Parivar, to preserve and protect the Ganga river and its tributaries; India Heritage Research Foundation (IHRF), which provides education, health care, youth welfare, and vocational training; Divine Shakti Foundation, which provides education and assistance to widowed and impoverished women and children, as well as the protection of street animals in India such as cows and dogs; the Global Interfaith WASH Alliance (GIWA) to provide access to safe drinking water, improved sanitation and proper hygiene; and Project Hope, an umbrella organization that brings together various humanitarian and environmental organizations in times of disaster to provide both emergency relief and long-term rehabilitation.
