= Parmarth Niketan =

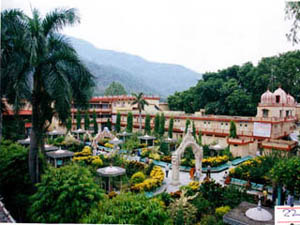
- Parmarth Niketan

- Location within Uttarakhand

Religion
- Affiliation: Hinduism
- District: Tehri Garhwal district

Location
- Location: Rishikesh
- State: Uttarakhand
- Country: India
- Coordinates: 30°7′9.21″N 78°18′43.9554″E

Architecture
- Creator: Pujya Swami Shukdevanandji Maharaj
- Established: 1942
- Completed: 1942
- Elevation: 372 m (1,220 ft)

Website
- parmarth.org

Parmarth Niketan is an ashram located in Rishikesh, Uttarakhand, India.

== Overview ==
Parmarth Niketan is situated along the banks of the Ganges in the Himalayan foothills. The ashram was founded in 1942 by Swami Shukdevanandji Maharaj (1901–1965). Since 1986, Swami Chidanand Saraswati has been the president and spiritual head of Parmarth Niketan. Sadhvi Bhagawati Saraswati has also lived and taught at the ashram for more than two decades.

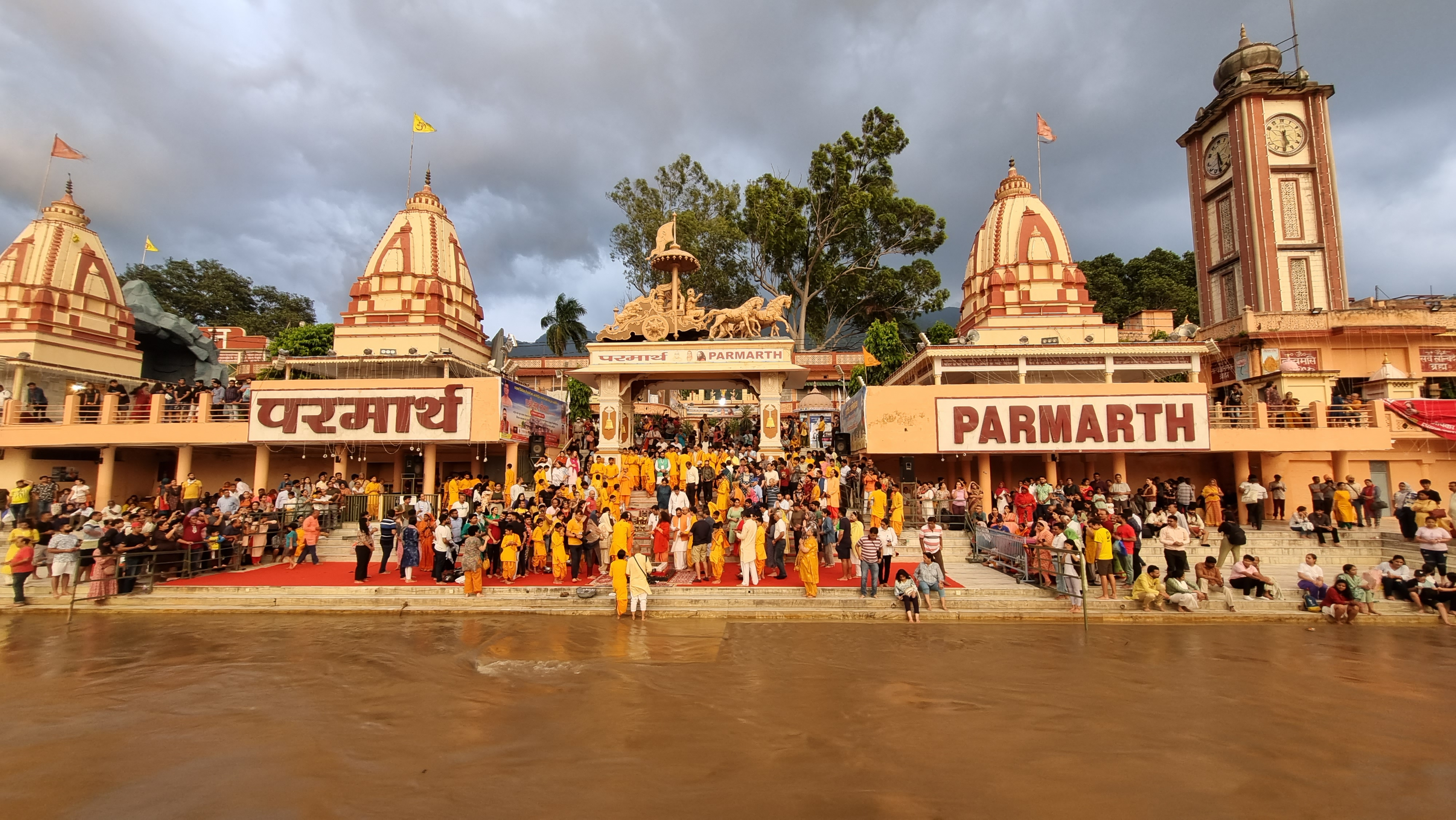
River ghat at the Parmarth Niketan

As the largest ashram in Rishikesh with over 1000 rooms, Parmarth Niketan provides a clean, pure and sacred atmosphere as well as abundant, beautiful gardens to thousands of pilgrims, who come from all corners of the Earth. The daily activities at Parmarth Niketan include daily yoga specializing in Vinyasa yoga, general Hatha yoga and yoga Nidra. Daily activities also include morning universal prayers and meditation classes, daily satsang and lecture programs, kirtan, a Ganga aarti at sunset attended by hundreds of visitors each day at the shore of Ganges, as well as Nature Cure and Ayurvedic treatment and training. Parmarth Niketan is the home to a 14 feet Shiva statue on the banks of the Ganges which provides a perfect view to the ashram. The divine tree of heaven Kalpavriksha was planted at the premises of this ashram by Vijaypal Baghel of Himalaya Vahini.

Additionally, there are frequently special cultural and spiritual programs given by visiting revered saints, acclaimed musicians, spiritual and social leaders, and others.

There are frequent camps in which pilgrims come from across the world to take part in intensive courses on yoga, meditation, pranayama, stress management, acupressure, Reiki, Ayurveda and other ancient Indian sciences.

Parmarth Niketan is also the headquarters of the Swami Shukdevanand Trust, a non-profit, religious/spiritual organization dedicated to religion, spirituality and culture, founded in 1942 by Pujya Swami Shukdevanandji Maharaj and registered in 1962 under the Societies Registration Act.

Parmarth Niketan is open to all visitors, with no discrimination on the basis of race, nationality, religion, caste or creed.

== Gallery ==
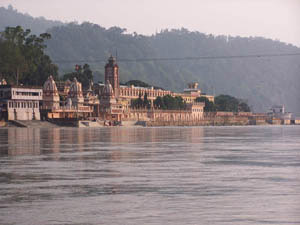
Parmarth Niketan view from Ganges

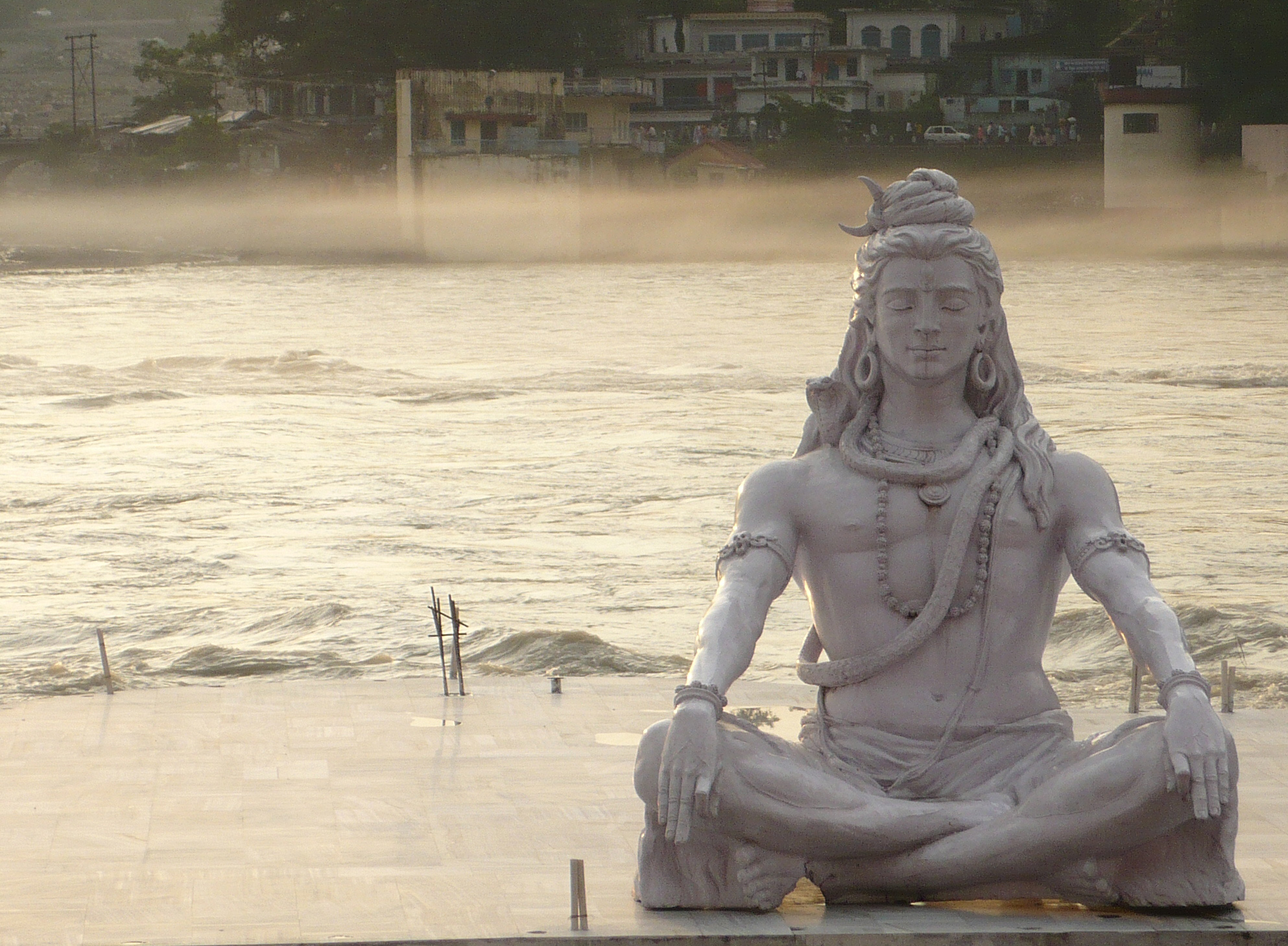
A statue of Shiva meditating at Parmarth Niketan on the Ganges

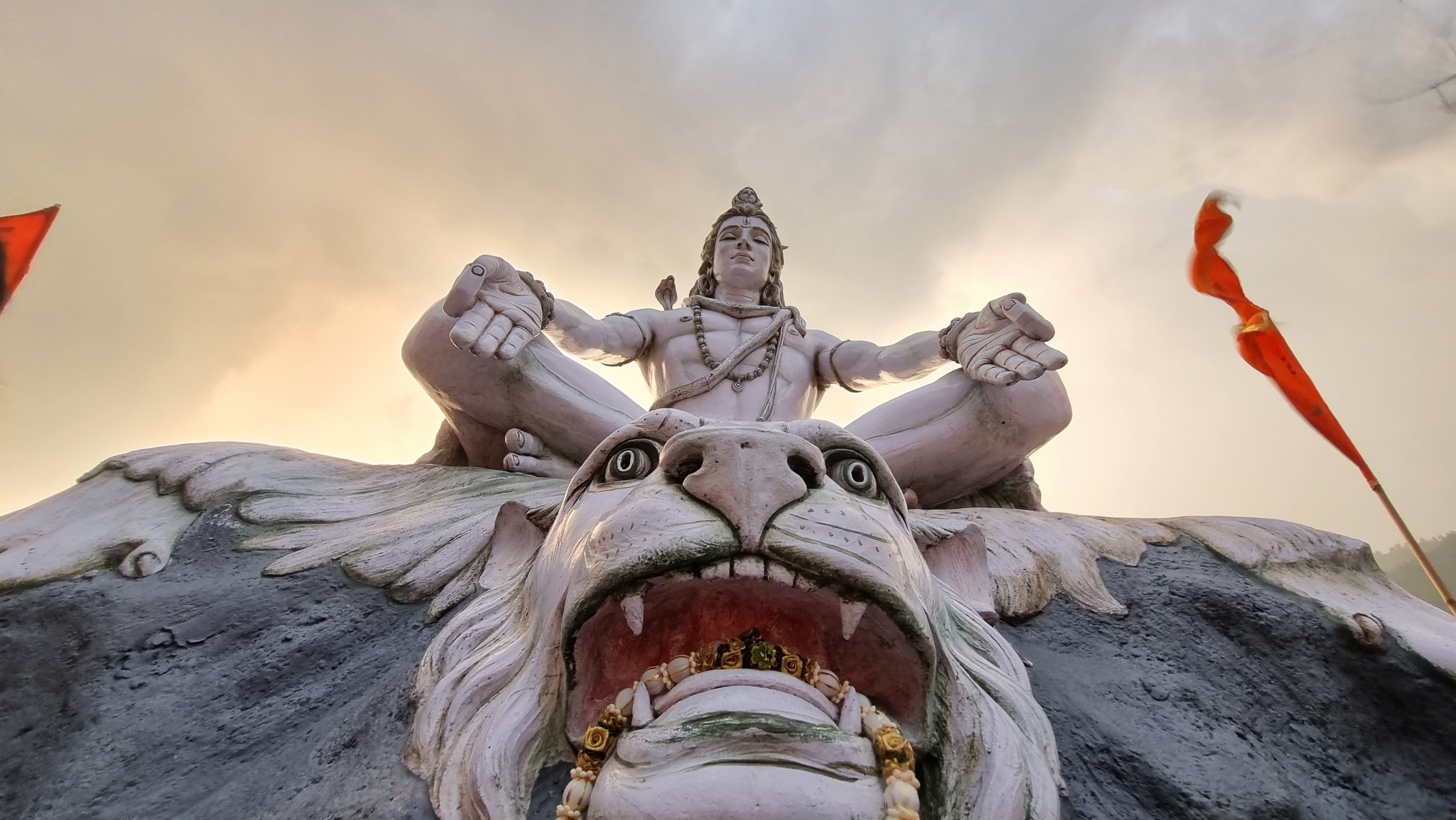
Shiva meditating in Rishikesh
