= National e-Governance Plan =

Indian digitalization initiative

- राष्ट्रीय ई-शासन योजना
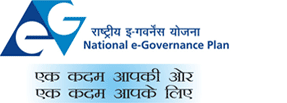
- Public Services Closer Home
- Abbreviation: NeGP
- Formation: May 18, 2006; 20 years ago
- Headquarters: New Delhi
- Location: Offices Spread All Over India
- Region served: India
- President & CEO (NeGD): Ms Radha Chauhan, IAS
- Parent organisation: Ministry of Electronics and Information Technology
- Website: meity.gov.in

The National e-Governance Plan (NeGP) is an initiative of the Government of India to make all government services available to the citizens of India via electronic media. NeGP was formulated by the Department of Electronics and Information Technology (DeitY) and Department of Administrative Reforms and Public Grievances (DARPG). The Government approved the National e-Governance Plan, consisting of 27 "Mission Mode Projects" (MMPs) and 8 components (now 31, 4 new added in 2011 viz Health, Education, PDS & Posts), on 18 May 2006. This is an enabler of Digital India initiative, and UMANG (Unified Mobile Application for New-age Governance) in turn is an enabler of NeGP.

"Meta data and data standards" is the official document describing the standards for common metadata as part of India's National e-Governance Plan.

== The plan ==
=== Background ===
The 11th report of the Second Administrative Reforms Commission, titled "Promoting e-Governance - The Smart Way Forward", established the government's position that an expansion in e-Government was necessary in India. The ARC report was submitted to the Government of India on 20 December 2008. The report cited several prior initiatives as sources of inspiration, including references to the Singapore ONE programme. To pursue this goal, the National e-Governance Plan was formulated by the Department of Information Technology (DIT) and Department of Administrative Reforms & Public Grievances (DAR&PG). The program required the development of new applications to allow citizen access to government services through Common Service Centers; it aimed to both reduce government costs and improve access to services.

=== Criticism ===
Lack of needs analysis, business process reengineering, interoperability across MMPs, and coping with new technology trends (such as mobile interfaces, cloud computing, and digital signatures) were some of the limitations of the initiative.

== See also ==
- Bangla Sahayata Kendra
- Central Excise Mission Mode Project
- e-Office Mission Mode Project
- My Gov
- Road and Transport Mission Mode Project
- UMANG
