= P. B. Salim =

Indian civil servant

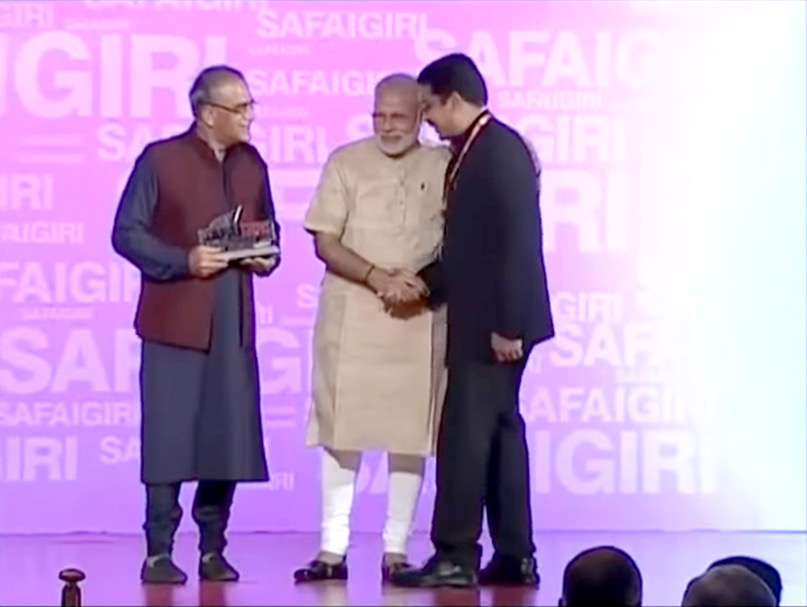
- P. B. Salim IAS receiving National Award on best performing district from Prime Minister Shri Narendra Modi

Chairman & Managing Director, West Bengal Power Development Corporation Limited

Dr. P B Salim is an IAS officer of the 2001 batch belonging to the West Bengal cadre. He hails from the south Indian state of Kerala.

== Career ==
Mahant Gyan Das on P. B. Salim

Dr. Salim served in a mix of assignments in West Bengal and Kerala. He started his career as Sub Divisional Officer Barrackpore and thereafter as OSD & under Secretary, Home Department, Govt. of West Bengal; Additional District Magistrate of South 24 Parganas District; General Manager, Kerala State Civil Supplies Corporation. He served as District Magistrate in two districts of Kerala viz. Kozhikode and Kannur and thereafter in two districts of West Bengal viz. Nadia and South 24 Parganas. He served as CEO, Rastriya Swastha Bima Yojana (RSBY) and National Rural Livelihood Mission (NRLM) in West Bengal.

In 2019 He began serving as the Chairman & Managing Director of West Bengal Power Development Corporation Limited (WBPDCL). He has also held additional position as Secretary, Chief Ministers Office (CMO) Public Grievances Cell, West Bengal.

== Recognition ==
- United Nations Public Services Award, 2015 – presented by the Secretary General of United Nations – for the pioneering Sanitation Movement in Nadia district
- Green Ganga Award at Rishikesh, June 2017 – presented by Union Cabinet Minister for MDW and Hon’ble Chief Minister of Uttarakhand – for transforming the million plus Ganga Sagar Mela into a ‘Clean Mela’
- British Chevening Scholarship – from the British Govt. for a diploma in Globalization & Leadership, at London School of Economics (LSE) in 2006
- National award for the Best District Election Officer from South India in 2015 – presented by HE the President of India (Smt. Pratibha Patil)
- National Award for Best Community Mobilizer 2015 – from the Hon'ble Prime Minister of India (Shri Narendra Modi) for making Nadia the first ODF (Open Defecation Free) district in the country
- Peoples award for the most popular Collector of Kozhikode – from HE the President of India (Shri APJ Abdul Kalam) in 2012
- Chief Ministers Award for Excellence, 2014 & 2023 – from Hon'ble Chief Minister of West Bengal (Smt. Mamata Banerjee)
- Kerala State Govt. e-governance award in 2010 & 2011 – from the Hon'ble Chief Minister of Kerala (Shri V S Achuthanandan & Shri Ommen Chandy)
- HUDCO National Award for Urban Leadership, 2015 – presented by Union Minister of Urban Development
- Award for best CEO, RSBY – for the year 2012 from Union Labour Minister

== Achievements ==
- WBPDCL posts highest ever operating profit of ₹1000 crore in 2024-2025
- Best performing power generation firm in India

== Publications ==
- Malabar Heritage and Culture editor along with Prof Hafis Muhammed and Prof N. C. Vasisht, by Mathrubhumi Publishers
- 101 Success Stories, editor along with Dr Muhammed, by Mathrubhumi Publishers

== Social Initiatives ==
- Sabar Shouchagar (Toilets for all)
- Founded the charitable society 'ANGELS' for pre-hospital care and ambulance networking
- Founded the first community-led palliative care society in West Bengal – Sanjeevani Palliative Care, Nadia
- Started Our Heritage Foundation and Punarjani in 2020 – running 24 bridge-learning centers
