= Common Service Centres =

Indian government facilities

- Founded: 16 July 2009; 17 years ago
- Founder: Ministry of Electronics and Information Technology (MeitY)
- Headquarters: Electronics Niketan, New Delhi, India
- Area served: Most of India
- Key people: Akhil Kumar, IPS (MD & CEO)
- Website: csc.gov.in

Common Service Centres (CSCs) are a key component of the Digital India initiative launched by the Government of India. These centres aim to provide essential government and non-government services to citizens, particularly in rural and remote areas, through digital means. By acting as access points for various public utility services, social welfare schemes, healthcare, financial, and education services, CSCs play a crucial role in the digital empowerment of the underserved populations.

== Establishment ==
The concept of CSCs was introduced in 2006 under the National e-Governance Plan (NeGP). The primary objective was to establish a network of ICT-enabled access points for delivering various government services to the rural populace. Over time, the scope of CSCs has expanded significantly. In 2015, under the Digital India program, CSCs were further empowered to offer a broader range of services, making them a vital component of the government’s strategy to enhance digital inclusion.

== Objectives ==
The main objectives of CSCs are:

- Digital Inclusion: To bridge the digital divide by providing digital services to rural and remote areas.
- Economic Inclusion: To extend banking and financial services to underserved communities.
- Educational and Skill Development: To promote online education and skill development programs like Skill India.
- Social Inclusion: To facilitate easy access to various social welfare schemes and services.

== Services ==
CSCs offer a diverse range of services, broadly categorized into five main areas:

1. e-Governance Services:

- Aadhaar: Services related to Aadhaar enrollment, updates, and biometric authentication.
- PAN Card: Application for new PAN cards and updates.
- Ration Card: Application and updates for ration cards.
- Certificates: Issuance of birth, death, and marriage certificates.
- Other Services: Voter ID, driving license applications, and more.

2. Financial Services:

- Banking Services: Opening Jan Dhan accounts, deposits, withdrawals, and mini statements.
- Insurance: Life insurance, health insurance, and vehicle insurance.
- Pension Schemes: Atal Pension Yojana, National Pension System (NPS).
- Loan Services: Loan applications and EMI payments.

3. Education:

- Online Education: Various courses and certification programs.
- Competitive Exam Preparation: Courses for SSC, banking, railway exams, etc.
- Scholarship Applications: Applications for various government and private scholarships.
- Skill Development: Various skill development programs.

4. Healthcare Services:

- Telemedicine: Online consultations with doctors.
- Health Insurance: Applications for health insurance schemes.
- Health Information: Information on various health schemes and services.

5. Other Services:

- Bill Payments: Payment of electricity, water, gas, and telephone bills.
- Recharge Services: Mobile and DTH recharges.
- Ticket Booking: Booking railway, bus, and air tickets.
- E-commerce: Online shopping and home delivery.

== Management ==
CSCs are operated by village-level entrepreneurs (VLEs). VLEs are local entrepreneurs who manage these centres and provide services to the citizens. They are trained and supported by the CSC Special Purpose Vehicle (SPV), ensuring that they can deliver services effectively.

Village Level Entrepreneurs (VLEs) –

VLEs are the backbone of the CSC ecosystem. They are responsible for running the CSCs, engaging with the community, and ensuring that the services are accessible to all. VLEs undergo rigorous training to understand the various services offered, how to use the digital platforms, and customer service skills.

Special Purpose Vehicle (SPVs) –

The CSC SPV is a company incorporated under the Companies Act, 1956 to oversee the implementation of CSCs across the country. It provides the necessary support, infrastructure, and training to VLEs, ensuring the smooth operation of CSCs.

== Difference between government scheme and CSCs ==
The Common Service Center (CSC) Scheme and the CSC Special Purpose Vehicle (SPV) Company serve different roles within the Digital India initiative. The CSC Scheme is a government program aimed at providing digital access points for delivering various government and non-government services, especially in rural and remote areas. Its primary objectives include promoting digital inclusion, enhancing service delivery, and fostering economic development through local entrepreneurship via Village Level Entrepreneurs (VLEs). These centres offer a range of services, including e-Governance, financial, educational, and healthcare services.

In contrast, the CSC SPV is a corporate entity established under the Companies Act, 1956, to implement and manage the CSC Scheme. The SPV's responsibilities include overseeing the effective operation of CSCs, ensuring quality service delivery, and providing continuous support and training to VLEs. It coordinates between stakeholders, manages infrastructure, monitors performance, and facilitates the scheme's expansion.

While the CSC Scheme focuses on what services are provided and their impact on citizens, the CSC SPV concentrates on how these services are delivered, including logistics and operational management. Together, they aim to bridge the digital divide, promote economic and social inclusion, and drive rural development in India.

== Difference between Panchayat Sahayak and CSCs ==
The roles of Panchayat Sahayak and Common Service Centres (CSCs) are integral to rural development and governance in India, yet they serve distinct functions and objectives. Both entities contribute to the empowerment and efficient administration of rural areas, but their areas of focus and methods of operation differ significantly.

Panchayat Sahayaks are support staff appointed to assist Panchayats, which are local village councils responsible for grassroots-level administration and development. The primary role of a Panchayat Sahayak is to aid in the administrative and developmental tasks of the Panchayat. This includes record-keeping, documentation, and the implementation of various government schemes at the village level. Panchayat Sahayaks ensure that the administrative machinery of the Panchayat functions smoothly and that government initiatives effectively reach the local population. They assist in the preparation of development plans, maintain records of village properties, schemes, and beneficiaries, and help with the execution of government schemes related to infrastructure, health, education, and other developmental areas. Their goal is to enhance the efficiency and effectiveness of panchayats in governance and development activities, thereby ensuring that local governance is responsive to the needs of the village community.

In contrast, Common Service Centers (CSCs) are digital access points established under the Digital India initiative. CSCs aim to provide a wide range of government and non-government services to citizens, particularly in rural and remote areas. Managed by Village Level Entrepreneurs (VLEs), these centers serve as a bridge between the government and the rural populace, offering services that promote digital inclusion and economic development. The primary objective of CSCs is to bridge the digital divide by providing e-governance services, financial services, healthcare, education, and more to underserved populations. They promote digital literacy and economic development by enabling access to essential services. CSCs offer a broad spectrum of services, including Aadhaar and PAN card services, issuance of birth and death certificates, banking and insurance services, online education, telemedicine consultations, bill payments, and e-commerce. By making these services accessible locally, CSCs save time and costs for rural citizens and contribute to the overall goal of digital empowerment.

The key differences between Panchayat Sahayaks and CSCs lie in their functionality, objectives, scope of services, and operational models. Functionally, Panchayat Sahayaks are focused on local governance and administrative support within the Panchayat system. They work closely with the Panchayat to ensure the smooth implementation of development projects and the proper maintenance of records. Their role is primarily administrative and supportive, ensuring that the local governance mechanisms operate efficiently.

On the other hand, CSCs are designed to provide a wide range of digital and financial services to the community. They are not confined to administrative tasks but extend their services to include various aspects of digital inclusion and economic development. The objective of Panchayat Sahayaks is to enhance the administrative efficiency of Panchayats, while CSCs aim to provide digital and financial services to bridge the digital divide and promote economic development.

The scope of services provided by Panchayat Sahayaks is limited to administrative and developmental tasks specific to local governance. They assist in the execution of government schemes and the preparation of development plans, focusing on the specific needs and projects of the Panchayat they serve. In contrast, CSCs offer a broad spectrum of services that span e-governance, financial services, healthcare, education, and more. This wide range of services makes CSCs a crucial element in promoting digital literacy and economic empowerment in rural areas.

The operational model also differs significantly between the two. Panchayat Sahayaks work within the Panchayat system as support staff, directly assisting the local governance structures. They are typically appointed by the government and are part of the administrative setup of the Panchayat. In contrast, CSCs are operated by local entrepreneurs known as VLEs, who manage the service centers independently. VLEs receive training and support from the CSC Special Purpose Vehicle (SPV), which oversees the implementation and management of the CSC scheme.

Common Service Centers (CSCs) and Panchayat Sahayaks play different roles in rural development and governance in India, and their qualifications and methods of appointment differ significantly. CSC operators, known as Village Level Entrepreneurs (VLEs), are generally more educated, often holding postgraduate degrees or higher qualifications. In contrast, Panchayat Sahayaks are typically appointed with a minimum qualification of 10th pass. This difference in educational qualifications means that CSC operators tend to have a better understanding and capability to manage digital services and other responsibilities.

Panchayat Sahayaks are appointed with the approval of Gram Pradhans (village heads), making their selection process more localized and often influenced by local governance structures. On the other hand, CSC operators are chosen based on their qualifications and ability to manage and operate the service centers effectively. This merit-based selection ensures that CSCs are run by capable individuals who can provide a wide range of services efficiently.

CSCs have been in operation for almost 20 years and have gained significant experience in providing various e-governance, financial, educational, and healthcare services to rural communities. This long-standing experience has enabled CSCs to become a crucial part of the Digital India initiative, bridging the digital divide and promoting economic development in rural areas. Conversely, Panchayat Sahayaks are often viewed as less effective, with some criticism suggesting they do not always perform their duties efficiently. This perception of ineffectiveness contrasts sharply with the professionalism and efficiency generally associated with CSC operators.

In summary, while both Panchayat Sahayaks and CSCs play vital roles in rural development and governance, their functions, objectives, and operational models differ significantly. Panchayat Sahayaks focus on administrative support within the Panchayat system, ensuring efficient local governance. In contrast, CSCs provide a wide range of digital and financial services, promoting digital inclusion and economic development in rural areas. Together, they contribute to the overall goal of empowering rural communities and enhancing the effectiveness of rural governance and development initiatives. Both Panchayat Sahayaks and CSCs are important to rural governance; CSCs are generally managed by more educated and qualified individuals with significant experience, leading to more effective service delivery.

== Digital literacy ==
One of the significant aspects of CSCs is promoting digital literacy among rural citizens. Programs like the Pradhan Mantri Gramin Digital Saksharta Abhiyan (PMGDISHA) aim to make six crore rural households digitally literate. Through these programs, citizens are educated on the basics of computers, internet usage, and how to access various digital services.

== Impact and benefits ==
CSCs have had a substantial impact on various fronts:

1. Access to Services: CSCs provide easy and affordable access to a wide range of services, reducing the need for citizens to travel long distances to government offices.

2. Time and Cost Savings: By offering services locally, CSCs save time and money for rural citizens.

3. Employment Generation: VLEs create employment opportunities in rural areas.

4. Digital Inclusion: CSCs contribute significantly to the goals of Digital India by promoting digital literacy and inclusion.

5. Economic Development: Access to financial services through CSCs promotes economic inclusion and rural economic growth.

== Challenges and future prospects ==
While CSCs have been successful in many areas, they face several challenges:

1. Infrastructure Issues: Poor internet connectivity and unreliable power supply in rural areas.

2. Training and Support: Need for continuous training and technical support for VLEs.

3. Awareness: Lack of awareness among citizens about the services available at CSCs.

To address these challenges, the government and CSC SPV are working on various fronts. Future plans include:

1. Improving Infrastructure: Enhancing internet connectivity and power supply in rural areas.

2. Expanding Services: Introducing more services and making them accessible to a larger population.

3. Enhancing Training Programs: Providing ongoing training and support to VLEs.

4. Raising Awareness: Conducting awareness campaigns to inform citizens about the services available at CSCs.

=== Local initiatives ===
Various local CSC operators and digital service initiatives have contributed to the expansion of e-governance services at the grassroots level.

One such initiative, Amaan Digital World, has been mentioned in the CSC e-Governance Services India Limited e-magazine for its role in facilitating digital services and supporting citizen access to government schemes at the local level.

== Problems ==
The introduction of Panchayat Sahayaks by the government has been seen as an injustice to Common Service Centres (CSCs). CSC operators, known as Village Level Entrepreneurs (VLEs), do not receive a fixed salary for their services. Instead, they earn commissions based on the transactions and services they provide. This lack of a stable income contrasts sharply with Panchayat Sahayaks, who receive a fixed monthly salary of 6,000 rupees.

Furthermore, there are concerns about corruption among Panchayat Sahayaks. Reports suggest that some Panchayat Sahayaks engage in corrupt practices, misusing their positions for personal gain. This not only undermines the trust of the villagers but also hampers the effectiveness of local governance. In contrast, CSC operators, who rely on their efficiency and service quality to earn their livelihood, tend to operate with higher levels of transparency and accountability.

The experience and qualifications of CSC operators make them well-suited to deliver a wide range of digital services, promoting digital inclusion and economic development in rural areas. Despite this, the lack of a fixed income poses a significant challenge, especially when compared to the fixed salary and perceived inefficiencies of Panchayat Sahayaks.

The disparity in income and the issues of corruption among Panchayat Sahayaks highlight the need for a more balanced and fair approach to rural service delivery. Recognising the valuable role of CSCs and providing them with better support and remuneration could enhance their effectiveness and ensure more equitable service delivery in rural areas.

== Conclusion ==
Common Service Centres (CSCs) are an integral part of India’s digital transformation journey. By providing a wide range of services to rural and remote areas, they play a critical role in bridging the digital divide, promoting economic and social inclusion, and driving rural development. The success of CSCs lies in their ability to deliver services efficiently and effectively, ensuring that no citizen is left behind in the digital era. With continued support and enhancements, CSCs have the potential to further revolutionise service delivery in India, making government services more accessible and inclusive.

== See also ==
- Common Service Centres
- India Portal
- Digital India
- Internet in India
- Telecommunications in India
- Mobile telephone numbering in India
- List of mobile phone brands by country
- List of countries by Internet connection speeds
- List of countries by smartphone penetration
- Electronics and semiconductor manufacturing industry in India
- National e-Governance Plan
- Standup India
- Ministry of Electronics and Information Technology
