= Digital India =

Online infrastructure in India

- Motto: Power To Empower
- Country: India
- Ministry: Ministry of Electronics and Information Technology; Ministry of Finance
- Key people: Ashwini Vaishnaw; Rajeev Chandrasekhar
- Launched: 1 July 2015; 11 years ago
- Status: Active
- Website: digitalindia.gov.in

Digital India is a government of India programme that aims to deliver government services electronically, expand broadband connectivity to rural India, improve citizens' digital literacy, and expand digital inclusion. Indian Prime Minister Narendra Modi launched it on 1 July 2015; the Ministry of Electronics and Information Technology (MeitY) primarily administers it, working alongside related programmes such as Bharat Broadband Network, Make in India, and Atmanirbhar Bharat.

The programme is organised around three pillars: digital infrastructure as a utility available to every citizen, governance and on-demand services, and digital empowerment. Independent assessments after a decade of launch credit it with building one of the world's largest "digital public infrastructure"—Aadhaar, the Unified Payments Interface, and several other platforms. Gaps in rural access, gender parity, data protection, and programme transparency persist.

The programme has become the umbrella under which the Government of India has built and promoted state-run and state-backed digital platforms, including the Open Network for Digital Commerce and Government e-Marketplace. At the launch of the program, several domestic and international companies promised to invest ₹4.5 lakh crore (equivalent to ₹7.4 trillion or US$77 billion in 2026), with Mukesh Ambani leading with a ₹2.5 lakh crore (equivalent to ₹4.1 trillion or US$43 billion in 2026) pledge. The programme was expected to create 18 lakh jobs

== History ==
Indian Prime Minister Narendra Modi launched the program on 1 July 2015 to connect rural areas with high-speed internet networks and improve digital literacy. The program aimed to promote inclusive growth in electronic services, products, manufacturing, and employment creation. A similar initiative, the National e-Governance Plan, was launched by the United Progressive Alliance government in May 2006.

== Platforms and services ==
=== Aadhaar ===
Aadhaar, India's biometric digital identity system, underpins most digital India services; as of 2025, it covers an estimated 99.9% of India's adult population, with over 1.39 billion identities issued. Aadhaar-based e-KYC (electronic "know your customer") is extensively used across banking, telecom, financial services, and welfare schemes.

=== Unified payment interface ===
While formally the Unified Payments Interface (UPI) is an initiative of the Reserve Bank of India and the National Payments Corporation of India rather than a Digital India project, it is part of the larger digital public infrastructure push. UPI processes over 100 billion transactions annually and has been adopted in several other countries.

=== DigiLocker ===
DigiLocker allows citizens to store and share government-issued documents digitally using Aadhaar-based authentication. The platform's website claims that it has OVER 73.5 crore registered users (27+ crore active users), and over 900 crore issued documents. As of August 2026, 2,885 government agencies are registered with DigiLocker as document issuers, and 4,313 government and private agencies as document requesters (the government allows several classes of businesses to request documents for specific purposes, such as banks and financial institutions for credit assessments and identity confirmation).

=== Education and training ===
In 2017, the government approved an outlay of ₹2,351.38 crore (equivalent to ₹36 billion or US$370 million in 2026) for Pradhan Mantri Gramin Digital Saksharta Abhiyan (Prime Minister Rural Digital Literacy Mission), aiming to make 6 crore rural households digitally literate by March 2020.

=== Other initiatives ===
UMANG is a multi-platform, multi-lingual app for accessing over 1,200 central and state government services. In the 2016 Union budget, the government announced several technology initiatives to prevent tax evasion.

== State initiatives ==
Several states have taken initiatives under the Digital India umbrella. A brief list of the initiatives is given below.

=== Andhra Pradesh ===
In 2014, Chandrababu Naidu-led government held its first cabinet meeting through an app. The state has launched E-Pragati, a digital framework that provides 750 services from 34 departments through a single platform. In 2018, the government launched Bhudhaar, a project to assign an 11-digit identifier to each land parcel across the state. Other initiatives include e-Panta, an Android-based app to collect crop-related information, and a portal that lets financial institutions verify whether another loan has been issued against a land parcel.

== Reception and critical assessment ==
A decade after its launch, assessments have noted that Digital India helped build one of the world's largest digital public infrastructures. A 2025 review by the Observer Research Foundation (ORF) found that broadband subscribers grew roughly tenfold, from about 99 million in 2014 to 944 million by 2025. Aadhaar enrolment reached 1.39 billion people, and UPI transactions grew from ~72 lakh per month in 2016 to ~1790 billion by 2025. However, the same review identified continuing gaps in rural access, gender parity, data protection, and programme transparency. In 2017, the Vietnamese government discussed emulating India's e-governance and cybersecurity approach.

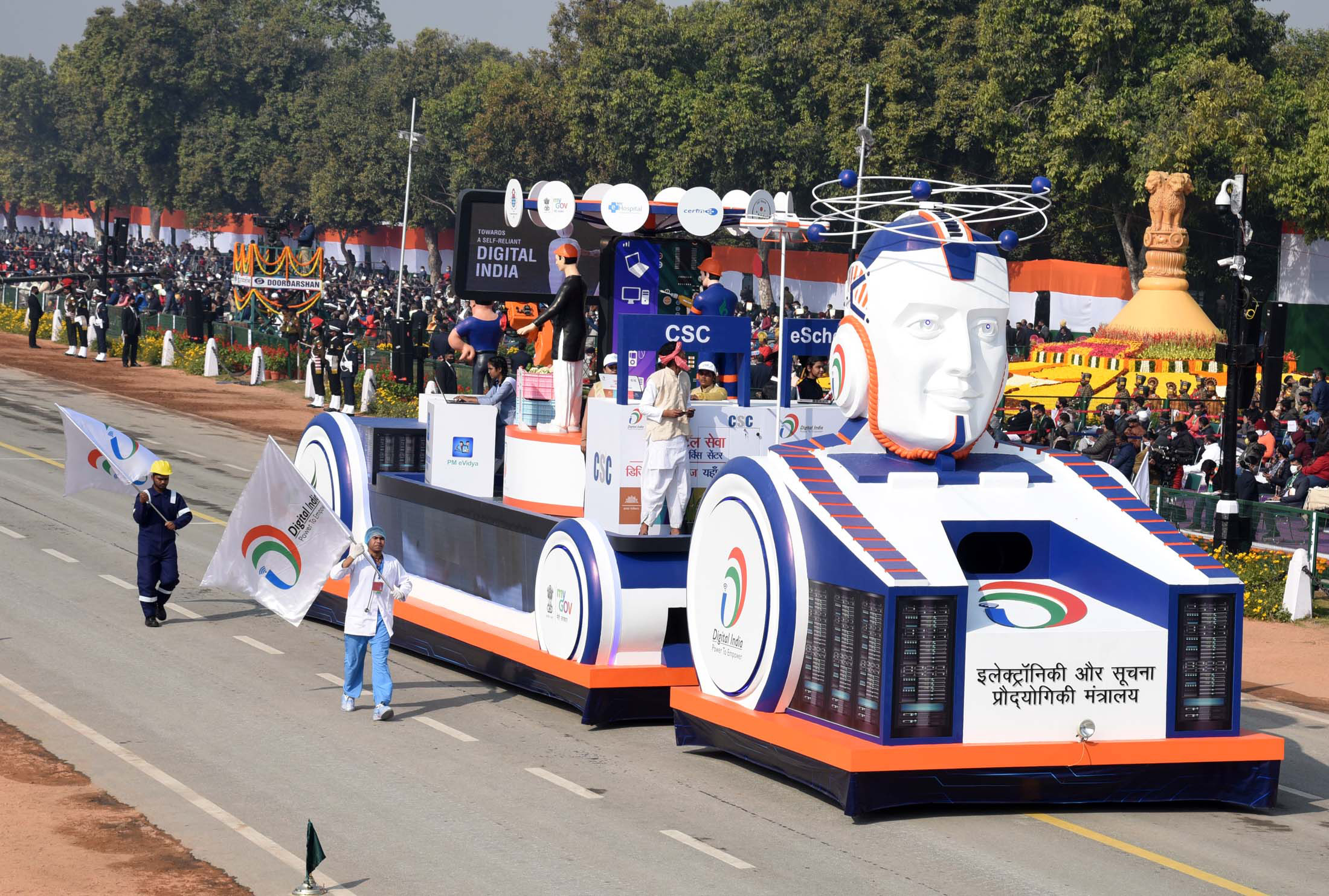
The tableau of the Ministry of Communications and Electronics and Information Technology passes through the Rajpath at the 72nd Republic Day Celebrations, in New Delhi on January 26, 2021.

=== Criticism and challenges ===
Scholars have challenged technological determinism, the notion that digital tools alone can resolve entrenched social and governance issues. Instead, governments must tailor solutions to their nation's specific political and social context. Others note that technology amplifies underlying institutional forces, so technology must be accompanied by significant changes in policy and institutions to have a meaningful impact. The benefits of the initiative have also accrued unevenly. The ORF study noted that tele-density stood at about 59% against 131% in urban areas, and less than half of rural women owned a mobile phone compared to 80.7% for rural men.

The extension of the programme to state-run commercial platforms, including the Open Network for Digital Commerce, has drawn criticism for the government intervening in the market as both a referee and a player without a specific need to address a public-goods rationale. Data security and privacy have been recurring concerns. The Comptroller and Auditor General of India flagged multiple issues with Aadhaar, including data matching, authentication errors, and shortfall in achieving targets. The New York-based Software Freedom Law Center has questioned the expansion of Aadhaar-based authentication for many services without addressing critical gaps in India's data-protection framework. The programme has also been criticised for bias towards Reliance Industries, with allegations that telecom regulations were amended to favour the company.

== See also ==
- Common Service Centres
- Internet in India
- Telecommunications in India
- Mobile telephone numbering in India
- List of mobile phone brands by country
- List of countries by Internet connection speeds
- List of countries by smartphone penetration
- Electronics and semiconductor manufacturing industry in India
- Flexible electronics
- India.gov.in
- National e-Governance Plan
- Standup India
- Make in India
- Smart Cities Mission
- Digital Literacy
