= Pandit Jasraj Institute of Music Toronto =

The Pandit Jasraj Institute of Music Toronto (PJIM) is a non-profit institute that fosters the preservation, growth and teaching of Indian classical music in the tradition of the Mewati Gharana, named after Jasraj. The institute is based in Mississauga, Ontario and classes are taught by Amit Arya, disciple of Jasraj.

== Activities ==
The institute holds regular classes for many students. PJIM Toronto also organizes a bi-annual student's performance titled Baithak and organizes artistes' concerts. In May 2012, Jasraj performed for Pandit Jasraj Institute Toronto, along with Tripti Mukherjee and Amit Arya. In June 2013, Pritam Bhattacharjee, disciple of Jasraj was the featured performer along with many of the students learning at the institute.

== See also ==
- Pandit Jasraj Institute for Music, Research, Artistry and Appreciation in the United States
