= Pandit Puranchandra =

Indian Hindustani classical vocalist

Puranchand Gavaiya
- Born: 12 July 1929; Haryana
- Died: 29 December 1991 (aged 62); Gujarat
- Genres: Indian classical music
- Occupation: Hindustani Classical musician
- Years active: 1940s–1990s

Puranchandra Pandit, more commonly known as Pandit Puranchandra and Puranchand "Gavaiya", (1929 – 1991) was an Indian classical singer of the Mewati gharana. He is known for being first cousins to and collaborators with Pandit Jasraj, Pandit Pratap Narayan, and Pandit Maniram. He also studied for some time with members of the Agra Gharana.
