= Tripti Mukherjee =

Indian vocalist

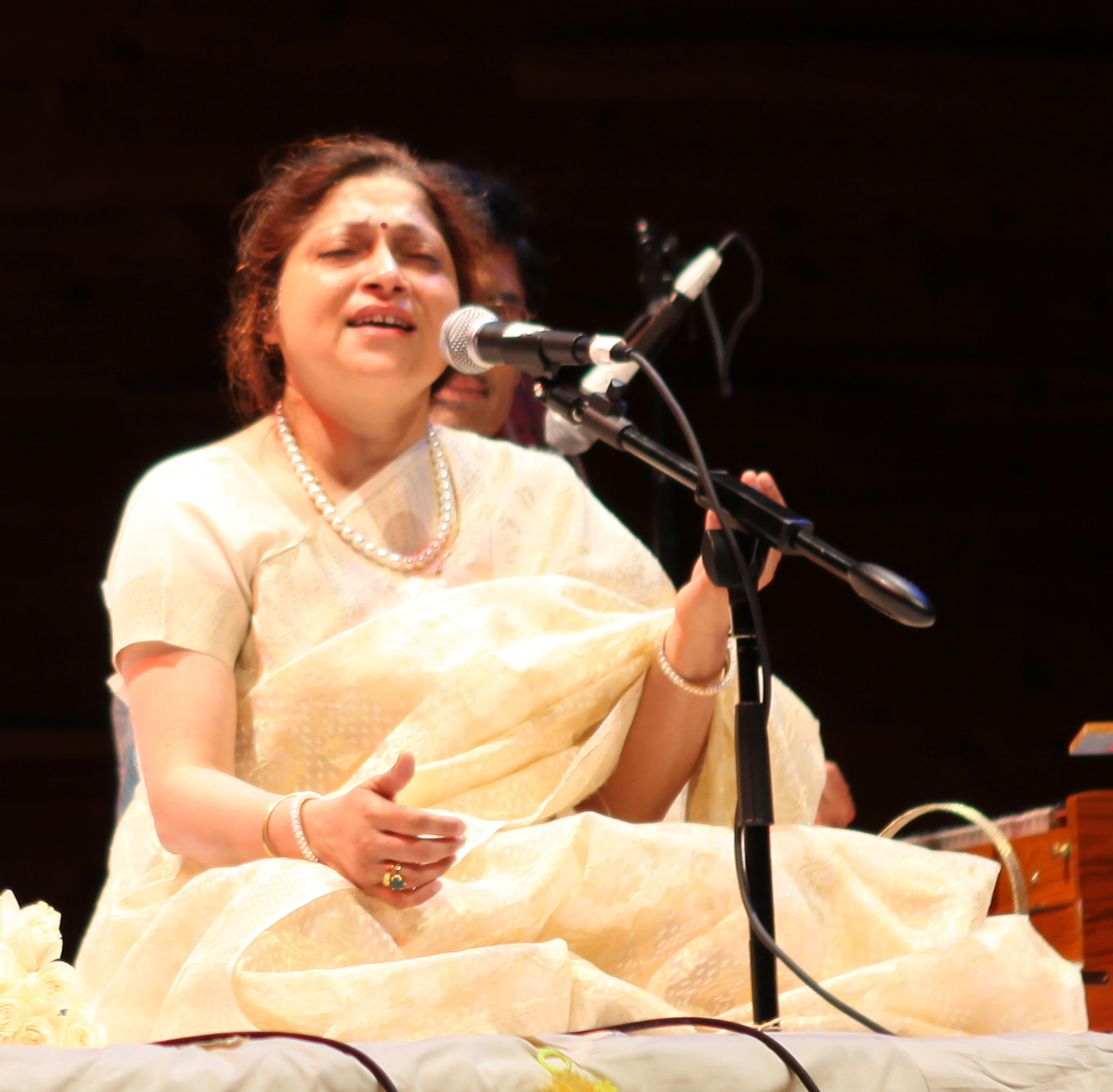

Background information
- Origin: India
- Genres: Hindustani classical music, Mewati Gharana
- Occupation: Classical Vocalist
- Website: Official site

Tripti Mukherjee is an Indian-American classical vocalist. She belongs to Mewati gharana. She is the founder and director of the Pandit Jasraj Institute for Music, Research, Artistry and Appreciation in New Jersey.

== Early life ==
Tripti Mukherjee is a senior disciple of Padma Vibhushan Pandit Jasraj.

== Career ==
Tripti Mukherjee and her commitment over the past 30 years to spreading India's rich culture and heritage in their purest forms throughout America.

Pta Triptiji has received great recognition for her stellar performances at a multitude of locations across the world. She is a regular artiste for All India Radio and national Indian Television. Some of her prominent performances across the globe are mentioned below:

- Diwali Festival (2007) at White House, Washington, DC
- Jewels of India Concert Series at the Indian Consulate in New York, NY
- Symphony Space in New York, NY
- Wortham Theatre Center in Houston, TX
- Annual Pandit Motiram Pandit Maniram Sangeet Samaroh in Hyderabad
- Hari Vallabh Sangeet Samaroh in Jalandhar
- Sawai Gandharva Music Festival in Pune
- Dover Lane music festival in Kolkata
- Community college theatres in Hayward, CA and Northampton, PA

== Awards ==
Pta Tripti Mukherjee is the recipient of several awards including:

- Chhandayan Jyotsna Award
- Amir Khan Memorial Award
- Pandit Jasraj Gaurav Puraskar
- Pandita award from the University of Karnataka
- National Scholarship for Hindustani Classical Vocal
- Doverlane Music Circle Award
- Yugantar Patrika Award

She was awarded Padma Shri, the fourth highest civilian award of India, in 2015.
