= Chhandayan =

US-based nonprofit organization

Chhandayan, Inc.
- Formation: 1984 (India), 1998 (U.S.A.)
- Headquarters: 4 W. 43rd Street #616; New York, NY 10036
- Founder: Samir Chatterjee
- Website: Official site

Chhandayan, Inc. (Chhandayan) is a nonprofit 501(c)(3) charitable organization focused on the preservation and advancement of Indian classical music. Chhandayan was founded in 1984 by Samir Chatterjee, the current Artistic Director and President. Its activities span various areas of music education which include organizing concerts and pre-concert lectures, classes (theory and performance), workshops, and archival research. Chhandayan’s primary operations are based out of its New York City headquarters, the Chhandayan Center for Indian Music (CCIM), but its activities are carried out in six local chapters.

== History ==
Chhandayan traces its roots to 1984 in Kolkata, India where it used to organize Indian classical music concerts designed to offer a platform for young musicians. In 1998, it was reestablished in the United States as a nonprofit 501(c)(3) charitable organization limited to offering musical instruction and small-scale concerts. Over the next several years, the organization added more students and faculty, eventually forming local chapters in New Jersey, Pennsylvania, Maryland, Virginia, and Florida. Chhandayan's largest presence is in the New York metropolitan area, but the Washington metropolitan area is a significant source of students, faculty, and audience members as well. Samir Chatterjee is the Founder, Artistic Director, and President of Chhandayan. He is a leading Tabla player and represents the Farukhabad gharana (school) of tabla playing. Chatterjee's performances, lectures, and teachings have made contributions to both Indian and other world music traditions. His compositions and writings are widely acclaimed.

== Timeline of Key Events ==
- 1984: Founded in Kolkata, India
- 1986: Organized and staged the first Three-day Annual Music Festival (Kolkata, India)
- 1998: Reestablished in the United States
- 2000: Organized and staged the first Annual All-Night Concert (New York City)
- 2001: Chhandayan World Percussion Ensemble (CWPE) performed "United We Stand, Drums of Unity & Peace," a benefit concert for World Trade Center victims
- 2005: Established the annual Jyotsna Awards in Contribution; produced first DVD, Dawning Ragas
- 2006: Published A Study of Tabla by Samir Chatterjee
- 2007: Samir Chatterjee performed at the Nobel Peace Prize Award Ceremony in Oslo
- 2008: Undertook first trip to Afghanistan to establish the Department of Afghan Traditional Music
- 2009: Published Music of India which covers Raga, Tala (music), and other Indian classical music concepts
- 2010: Reached enrollment of approximately 200 students in vocal, instruments, Tabla, and Indian classical dance
- 2011: Performed "Tablaphilia," a 25-member Tabla symphony orchestra at the Metropolitan Museum of Art (composed in 2009)
- 2012: Opened a sixth local chapter in Virginia
- 2013: Hosted Fundraising Concert for Afghanistan with Irfan Muhammad Khan of Afghanistan National Institute of Music (ANIM)

== Activities ==
The various activities conducted by Chhandayan include:

=== Classes & Workshops ===
Chhandayan offers lessons and classes on different branches of Indian classical music including training in vocals, Violin, Sitar, Sarangi, Bansuri, Harmonium (hand-pumped), and Tabla. Training in Indian classical dance including Kathak is also offered on a weekly basis at CCIM. Although modern technology has created the ability to reach students across the world, music instruction at Chhandayan is generally based upon the Guru-shishya tradition. Throughout the week, Chhandayan offers classes for Indian classical music and Tabla under the guidance of a Guru, mainly geared towards young students. There is an annual four-day Tabla workshop each summer run by Samir Chatterjee which draws students of all levels from various parts of North America. Affiliated faculty members who have run workshops in the past include Ajoy Chakrabarty (Vocal), Shujaat Khan (Sitar), Nayan Ghosh (Tabla), and other top Indian classical musicians.

Chhandayan has approximately 250 students, many of whom are professional musicians in various parts of the world. Among the most prominent Chhandayan students include: Daniel Weiss, Eric Phinney, Bodek Janke, Debu Nayak, Frank Colón, Dibyarka Chatterjee, Ranendra Das, among others. Annual workshops and seminars draw in approximately 100 additional students from the Americas and Europe.

=== Publications & Archives ===
Chhandayan engages in the publication and archival of resource material to promote research in the classical arts of India. Chhandayan's published books include A Study of Tabla, the 650-page text on Indian music theory and Tala (music); Ravi Shankar, a former member of the organization's Advisory Board, wrote the foreword to the book. Chhandayan has also published Music of India, an introductory text to Indian classical music concepts. It has published approximately ten works in the form of recorded media including an audiobook on the style and diction of Rabindranath Tagore which is currently in final editorial stages. Chhandayan's works have often addressed those aspects of Indian classical music that have become absent on the concert platform.

=== Social Contributions & Productions ===
Chhandayan's service focuses primarily on education, resources, archival preservation, and research. Its overall mission is to educate people not only about music, but also about the social context in which it is to be created and experienced. For example, Chhandayan has been involved in the music revival of Afghanistan. It has actively brought some of the shared musical tradition from outside the country back to Afghanistan to achieve some degree of cultural revival. It is also working with local Afghan authorities in the adoption of musically inclined orphans.

Chhandayan seeks to transform what is commonly considered "high art" into something with more staying power. Acting on that belief, it has channeled several students to work with incarcerated adults and their children. It hopes to bring loved ones in need of rehabilitation closer through music. This project is focused in the Washington metropolitan area.

Most of the operations and activities are run by volunteers within the organization and world music community. For example, Chhandayan allows students to make non-financial contributions (namely, volunteering in the offices of CCIM) to expand the community's access to its educational resources. Also, a team of volunteers for the Annual All-Night Concert is charged every year with outreach efforts.

Finally, as a music organization Chhandayan intends to enhance awareness regarding the importance of music in general in present society. Much of this takes place through new works, productions, and compositions under the artistic leadership of founding director Samir Chatterjee. In 2009, Chatterjee composed and directed "Tablaphilia," a symphony for twenty-five Tabla players and four vocalists which interprets the four stages of life according to Hindu philosophy (ashramas). In 2011, Chhandayan produced and performed "RabiThakur," a ballet on the life of Rabindranath Tagore. The ballet integrates Western and Eastern expressions of contemporary music and dance and the choreography, by Ryan Daniel Beck, is set to music arranged and composed by Chatterjee.

=== The Concert Series & the Annual All-Night Concert ===
Since 1984, Chhandayan has advanced the learning and appreciation of Indian classical music through concert experiences. Chhandayan presents regular series of concerts and pre-concert lectures in New York and in its other local chapters. The Concert Series, performances of Indian classical music or world music, is frequently held on weekend evenings in Chhandayan's various locations. CCIM tends to draw the largest audience members including those traveling from upstate New York, Connecticut, Pittsburgh, and the Beltway. Chhandayan's presence in various geographic footprints provides young artists with not only an audience through the Concert Series, but also access to mentorship, audience-building tools, and performance and teaching opportunities.

The capstone of the Concert Series is the Annual All-Night Concert which is currently in the fifteenth season. Since 2008, it has been held at the New York Society for Ethical Culture and draws close to 600 audience members throughout the night. The format, an all-night music festival, is rare outside of South Asia. Based on Chhandayan's network of matured musicians, the All-Night Concert provides an opportunity to hear and understand ragas, the underpinning melodic structures and scales of Indian classical music, at the late night and early morning hours. Various ragas are designed to express select moods from audience members and are performed throughout the night by Chhandayan's performing artists. The annual event in Manhattan is organized primarily by community volunteers and it draws a highly diverse audience. In 2010, the Annual All-Night Concert was also held for the first time in Toronto; it is currently in the fourth season there.

=== Jyotsna Awards in Contribution ===
Since 2005, Chhandayan has acknowledged the contributions of some extraordinary individuals and institutions with the Jyotsna Awards in Contribution. Contributions from six areas are recognized annually: presentation, publication, academia, documentation, Guru, and Shishya. The Jyotsna Awards are considered a high accolade within the genre and its recipients have made significant contributions toward the growth of Indian classical music in North America.

=== Collaboration with World Music ===
Chhandayan develops new work and productions offering insights into the scope of Indian music and its relationship with other musical and cultural traditions. To that end, it frequently works with musicians of other disciplines. For example, Chhandayan World Percussion Ensemble (CWPE) is an ensemble of percussion instruments from Africa, the Middle East, Europe, North and South America, and Asia. Indo-Flame is a blend of Indian and Flamenco dance and music. Dawn to Dusk and Beyond depicts the correspondence and influence of all types of music on physiology and the environment. Raga-Rock, a collaboration of Indian classical and Pakistani Sufi rock music with Salman Ahmed, performed at the Nobel Peace Prize Award Ceremony in Oslo in 2007. Chhandayan has also collaborated on world music projects in Western Classical music and ballet.

== Faculty ==
Chhandayan has a number of regular faculty members, with Daniel Weiss and Samarth Nagarkar as Co-directors for Academic Affairs. Notable faculty includes Ramesh Mishra, Steve Gorn, Mitali Banerjee Bhawmik, and Samir Chatterjee. Chhandayan's educators do not just teach the fundamentals of Indian classical music, but also how to home in on aesthetic sensibilities and learn how to be a performer and a listener. The teachers are performers themselves who initiate and develop the students' skills in the Guru-shishya tradition. Some members also serve as visiting faculty at the University of Pittsburgh, Yale University, Manhattan School of Music, New School of Music, and other institutions. Chhandayan maintains close ties with senior faculty of The Pandit Jasraj Institute for Music, Research, Artistry and Appreciation (PJIM). The Director of PJIM, Tripti Mukherjee, is a visiting faculty member of Chhandayan and received a 2010 Jyotsna Award in Contribution. Other prominent visiting faculty members include Ajoy Chakrabarty (Vocal) and Shujaat Khan (Sitar).

== Administration & Board Members ==
Chhandayan is governed by a Board of Directors consisting of eight members. Further to the service-based mission, all members are voluntary workers who devote time and energy for the advancement of world music. Similarly, Chhandayan receives international support from its thirteen-member Advisory Board. Notable musicians on the Advisory Board include Jasraj, Ramesh Mishra, Ned Rothenberg, and Lyle Wachovsky. Ravi Shankar served as a key Advisory Board member from 1998 to December 2012.
