= Shobha Abhyankar =

Musicologist and teacher of the Mewati Gharana

- Born: 20 January 1946; Pune, Maharashtra, India
- Died: 17 October 2014 (aged 68) Pune, Maharashtra, India
- Genres: Khayal, Bhajans, Bhavgeet
- Occupations: Musician, Teacher, Academic
- Instrument: Vocal
- Years active: 1970–2014

Dr. Shobha Abhyankar (1946–2014) was an Indian musicologist and teacher of the Mewati Gharana. She is known for having taught many Hindustani Classical vocalists, like her son, Sanjeev Abhyankar

== Biography ==
Shobha Abhyankar was born in 1946 in Pune, India. She married Vijay Abhyankar with whom she had two sons.

She earned her M.Sc. in Biochemistry from Pune University. She completed an M.A. in Music from SNDT Women's University, where she placed first. She also completed a Ph.D. in Music on the topic of Marathi bhavgeet.

She trained in music for decades with Pt. Gangadharbuwa Pimpalkhare, Pt. V. R. Athavale, and Pt. Jasraj. Consequently, she is regarded as a member of the Mewati Gharana with background in Gwalior gayaki and Agra gayaki.

Abhyankar had been affiliated with Lalit Kala Kendra, Pune University, and SNDT Women's University as a music scholar and guru.

Abhyankar has taught many students across Maharashtra who have earned international and national awards and scholarships. Her most notable disciples include Sanjeev Abhyankar (her son) and Sandeep Ranade.

Abhyankar died on October 17, 2014, after suffering from cancer.

== Awards and recognition ==
- "Ganahira" Award
- Vasant Desai Award
- Pt. N. D. Kashalkar Award
- Pt. V. D. Paluskar Award
- "Raag Rishi" Award for Outstanding Work as a Guru
