= Jaiwant Singhji Vaghela =

Jaiwant Singhji Ranmal Singhji Vaghela
- Maharana of Sanand
- Predecessor: Ranmal Singhji Vaghela
- Successor: Rudradutt Singhji Vaghela (titular)
- Born: 1904; Sanand, Baroda State, British Indian Empire (now in Gujarat, India)
- Died: 17 June 1980 (age 76); Sanand, Gujarat, India
- House: Vaghela dynasty
- Father: Ranmal Singhji Vaghela
- Religion: Shaktism

Jaiwant Singhji Vaghela of Sanand (1904 – 17 June 1980), also known as Sanand Bapu, was an Indian king, spiritual leader, classical vocalist, beenkar, and musicologist belonging to the Mewati gharana (musical apprenticeship lineage). He is known for being the Thakur of Sanand and guru of Pandit Jasraj. His legacy includes contributions of compositions (performed and recorded famously by Pandit Maniram and Pandit Jasraj), new raags, and an integrationist approach to music philosophy.

== Background ==
Born into a family of music connoisseurs, Vaghela demonstrated interest in music from a young age. His grandfather, Bhagavat Singhji Vaghela, played the jaltarang and sang Krishna devotionals. His father, Ranmal Singhji Vaghela, appreciated music and dance and played the pakhawaj and tabla, which he studied from Ustad Nasir Khan Pakhawaji of Punjab gharana and Ustad Bachchu Khan of Delhi Gharana.

Vaghela studied music with Lakshmishankar of Rajkumar College, Rajkot. At Gujarat College in Ahmedabad, he studied singing, sitar, and vichitra veena with Govindprasad Gopal, a disciple of Ustad Faiz Ahmed Khan. At Sanand, he received training from his family's court musician, Munavvar Khan of the Mewati gharana, in singing and rudra veena.

== Legacy ==
Vaghela was considered like a Swathi Thirunal Rama Varma of North India. He wrote and composed many songs that were made famous by recordings and performance of Pandit Jasraj. These include "Niranjani Narayani" (Raag Bhairavi), "Mata Kalika", "Jagadamb Jagadamb", and others.

Vaghela also composed new raags including Raag Jaiwanti Todi, Raag Jaiwant Sarang, Raag Gyankali, Raag Rajrajeshwari, Raag Bagkauns, and Raag Bhavani Bahar.

In 1957, he established a boarding school for Rajput boys at Sanand.
