= Mewati gharana =

Classical music school of India

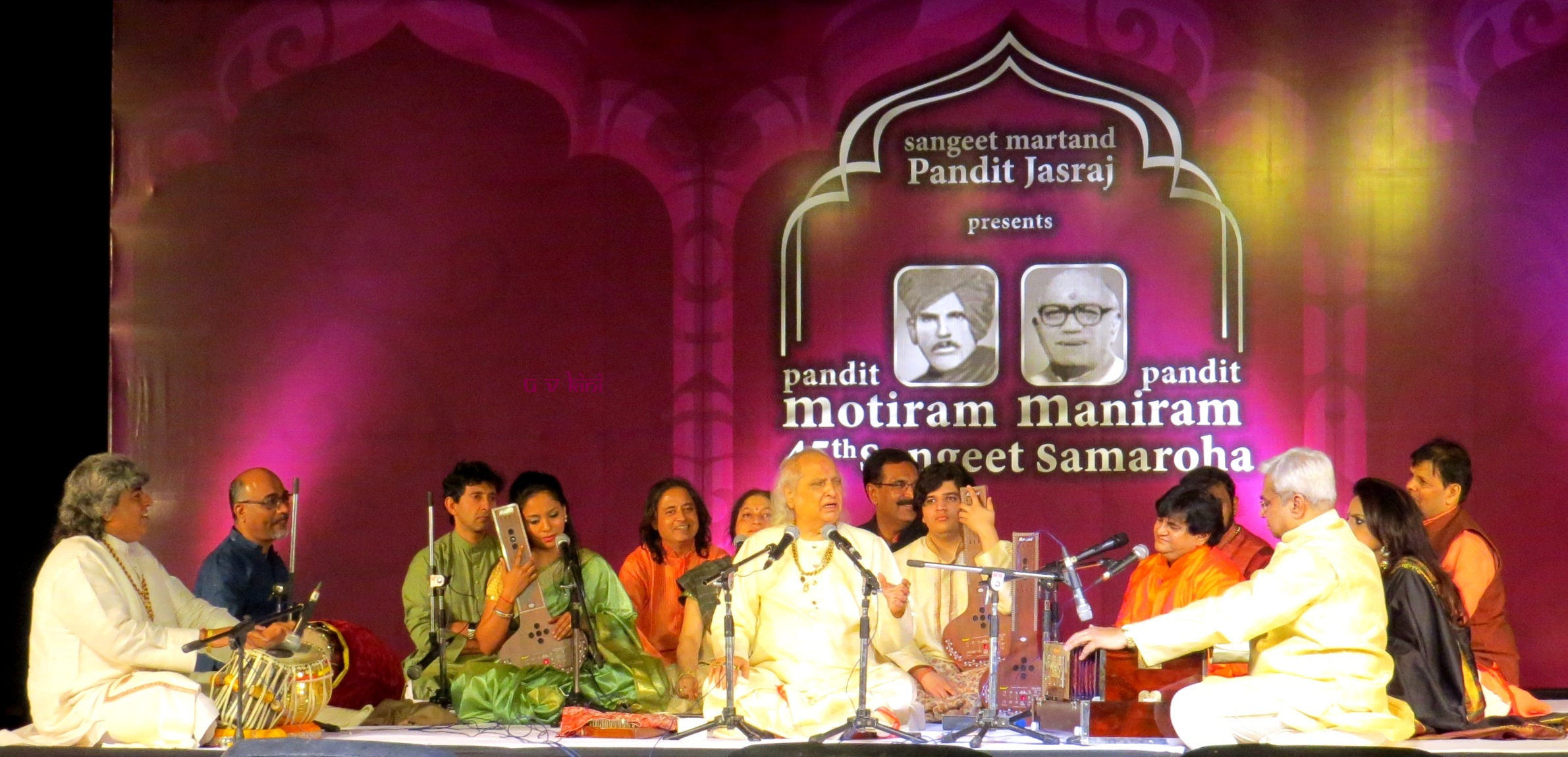
Singer Pandit Jasraj accompanied by his students (2017)

The Mewati gharana is a musical apprenticeship tribe of Hindustani classical music. Known for being Pandit Jasraj's musical lineage, the gharana was founded by brothers Ghagge Nazir Khan and Wahid Khan (beenkar) of Indore in the late 19th century at the Holkar Court. Members of this gharana have had an active influence in Indian cinema for over half a century.

With its own distinct aesthetics, stylings, practices, and repertoire, the gharana emerged as an offshoot of the Khandarbani Dhrupad, and Qawwal Bacchon musical traditions. The gharana gained visibility in the late 20th century after Pt. Jasraj popularized the gayaki.

== History ==
Ghagge Nazir Khan and Wahid Khan are regarded as fountainheads of the Mewati gharana. They were descendants of the Qawwal Bacchon gharana (Qawwal Bacchon Ka Gharana).

=== Etymology ===
The Mewati Gharana takes its name from the region between Delhi, Jaipur, and Indore where Ghagge Nazir Khan and Wahid Khan's family hailed, Mewat (not the Mewar region of Rajasthan).

=== Recent developments ===
Ghagge Nazir Khan passed on his musical tradition to his foremost disciples Munavvar Khan, Natthulal Pandit, Chimanlal Pandit, and Ghulam Qadir Khan. Natthulal passed the tradition onto his nephew, Motiram, who shared this tradition with his brother, Jyotiram, around the start of the 20th century.

=== Ancestry ===
Bade Mohammed Khan, son of Shakkar Khan of Lucknow, emerged from the Qawwal Bacchon tradition. His son, Waris Ali Khan, married a daughter of Haddu Khan. Through their union, Bade Mohammed Khan acquired the status of being a Gwalior gharana exponent and was regarded for his "taan bazi" repertoire.

Due to politics and competition with Natthu Khan's family, Bade Mohammed Khan relocated to Rewa in Bhopal as the court musician of the maharaja. Consequently, Ghagge Nazir Khan and Wahid Khan are associated with the Bhopal region in musical literature.

==== Geography ====
Seeking musical patronage, their ancestors immigrated from their origins in Delhi and Gwalior, settling first in Bhopal and later western Rajasthan.

== Pedagogical genealogy ==
=== Ancestry ===
The below illustration is based on the historical account provided by Siraj Khan.

Khandarbani; Dhrupad Tradition
Dada Tikkad of Agra (dhrupadiya)
Wazir Khan (dhrupadiya)	Imam Khan (dhrupadiya)
Wahid Khan (son)	Ghagge Nazir Khan (son)	Munavvar Khan (son)

=== Early pedagogy ===
A visual representation of Mewati gharana and its earlier roots.

Gwalior Gharana; Guru Parampara	Qawwal Bacchon; Guru Parampara	Khandarbani; Guru Parampara	Kirana Gharana; Guru Parampara	Dagarbani; Guru Parampara
Haddu Khan (Gwalior)	Sadiq Ali Khan (Kirana)	Behram Khan (Dagarbani)
Bade Mohammed; Khan (Rewa)
Chote Mohammed; Khan (son)	Bande Ali Khan (beenkar)
Waris Ali Khan (son)	Imam Khan (Dhrupadiya)
Ghagge Nazir; Khan (co-founder, vocalist)	Wahid; Khan (co-founder, beenkar)
Qawwal Bacchon & Bande Ali Khan; Parampara	Pandit; Chimanlal	Pandit; Natthulal	Munavvar; Khan	Begum; Hasibanbai	Majid; Khan	Latif; Khan
Hamid; Khan	Saddan; Khan
Rajab Ali; Khan	Pandit; Motiram	Ghulam Qadir; Khan
Pandit; Jyotiram	Mohammed; Shafi
Agra Gharana; Parampara	Jaiwant Singhji; Waghela	Mohammed; Khan	Begum Kaniz; Fatima
Abdul Kadar; Khan	Pandit; Maniram
Pandit; Pratap Narayan
Pandit; Puranchandra	Pandit; Jasraj	Rais Khan (sitarist)

=== Recent pedagogy ===
Mewati Gharana; Guru Parampara
Pandit; Maniram
Bansilal; Kapoor	Pandit; Pratap; Narayan	Pandit; Jasraj	Begum Kaniz; Fatima	Rais; Khan (sitariya)
Yogai; Sharma	Kankana; Banerjee	Shobha; Abhyankar	Krishnakant; Parikh	Mukund; Lath (musicologist)	Chandrashekhar; Swami	Girish; Wazalwar	Asha; Lohia	Anuradha; Paudwal
Vinod; Pandit	Pandit; Dinesh	Jatin; Pandit	Madhup; Mudgal	Arawind; Thatte	Ramesh; Narayan	Gargee; Siddhant; Dutta	Shweta; Jhaveri	Kavita; Krishnamurthy	Padmaja; Phenany; Joglekar	Siraj; Khan (sitariya)
Lalit; Pandit	Shaarang Dev; Pandit	Durga; Jasraj	Sadhana; Sargam	Kala; Ramnath (violinist)	Tripti; Mukherjee
Sanjeev; Abhyankar	Niraj; Parikh	Vikas; Parikh
Suman; Ghosh	Hemang; Mehta	Gautam; Kale	Radharaman; Kirtane	Rattan; Mohan; Sharma
Sandeep; Ranade	Pritam; Bhattacharjee	Shashank; Subramanyam (bansuriya)	Lokesh; Anand (shehnaiya)	Asad; Khan (sitariya)
Saptarshi; Chakraborty	Amit; Arya	Ankita; Joshi	Shahraaz; Khan
Akshat; Parikh	Adwait; Joshi	Aditya; Shah
Swar; Sharma	Azaan; Khan

== Overview ==
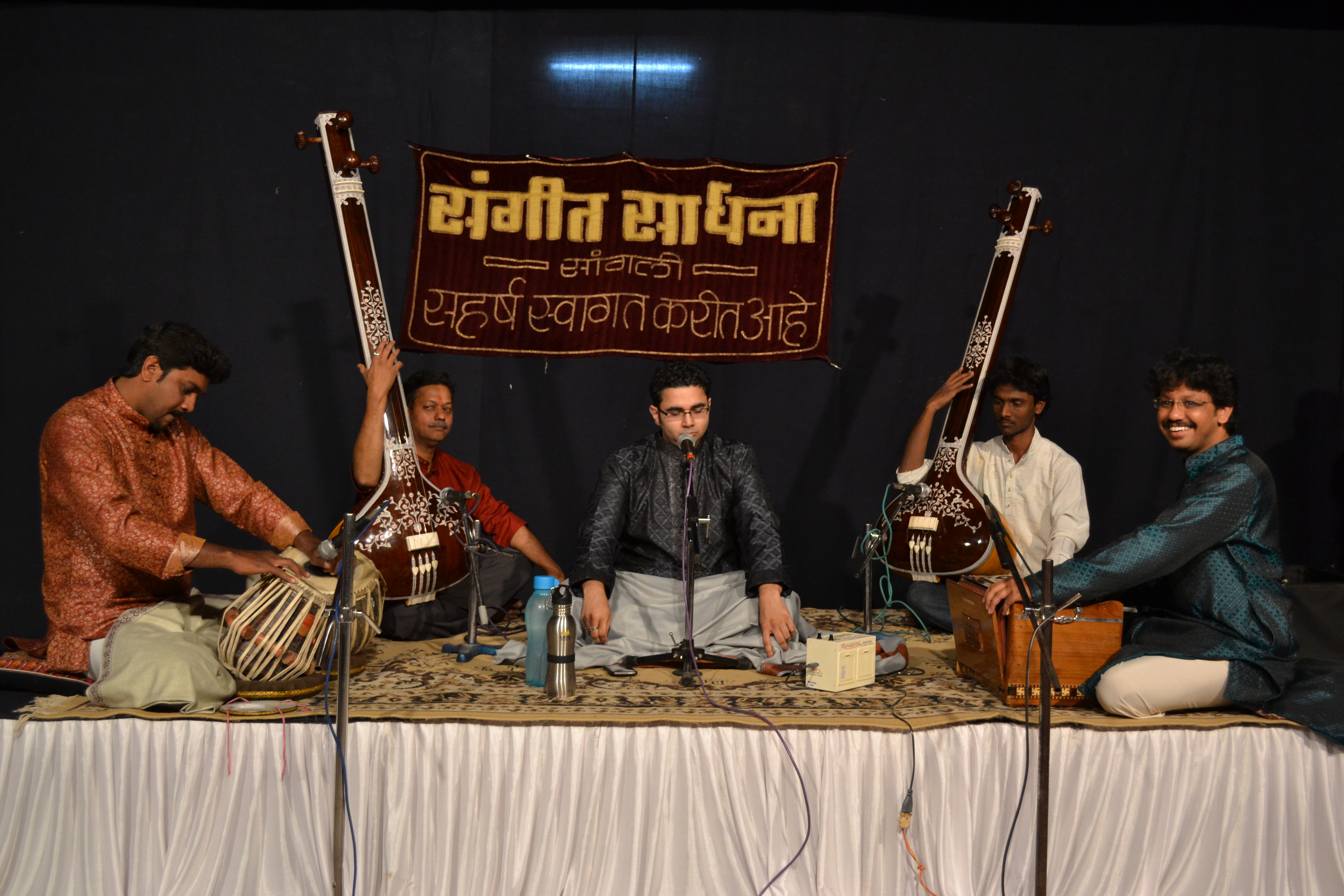
Mewati Gharana singer Sandeep Ranade performs at Bhave Natya Mandir, Sangli in December 2012.

=== Aesthetic approaches ===
Though the gayaki has roots in the style and trends of the Gwalior and Delhi, the Mewati gayaki has some distinct qualities. The Mewati gayaki emphasizes the importance of bhava and literature (bandish).

The gayaki's meend applications have been regarded for their smoothness and naturalness.

==== Philosophy ====
Maniram and Jasraj have described the essential philosophy of the Mewati tradition as based on "shuddha vani" (pure sound), "shuddha mudra" (pure expression), and "shuddha sur" (pure notes).

==== Religious themes ====
Through Sufiana mausiqi and bhaktic influences, the Mewati gayaki includes theistic and spiritual elements, where religious verses from Hinduism and Shia Islam (especially Ismailism) are incorporated not only in the grammatical content of the music, but as intrinsic elements in melodic expression. Jaiwant Singhji and Jasraj contributed numerous devotional compositions to the gharana's repertoire.

=== Unique musical material ===
==== Ragas ====
The Mewati Gharana holds ragas unique to its tradition. These include:

- Raga Jaiwanti Todi: A mixture of ragas Ahir Bhairav and Todi, created by Jaiwant Singhji.
- Raga Jaiwant Sarang: A mixture of ragas Jaijaiwanti and Sarang, created by Jaiwant Singhji.
- Raga Gyaankali: Inspired by Raga Gorakh Kalyan, created by Jaiwant Singhji.
- Raga Rajrajeshwari: Created by Jaiwant Singhji.
- Raga Bagkauns: Created by Jaiwant Singhji.
- Raga Din Ki Puriya
- Raga Khamaj Bahar: From the lineage of Bade Mohammed Khan.
- Raga Bhavani Bahar: From the lineage of Bade Mohammed Khan.
- Raga Asa Mand
- Raga Nat Narayani
- Raga Navarasa Kanada
- Raga Nagadhwani Kanada
- Raga Abiri Todi

==== Haveli Sangeet ====
Informed by the gharana's kirtankar tradition, Jasraj researched the haveli sangeet of Mathura and Brindavan. Consequently, many devotional compositions have been brought into the gharana's repertoire.

== Exponents ==
=== 19th century ===
- Wahid Khan (c. 1830 - 1928) was born to Imam Khan, a Khandarbani dhrupadiya, in Alwar. He learned rudra veena from Bande Ali Khan (Kirana and Dagarbani). He served as court musician to Indore State. Four of his children, Latif, Majid, Ghulam Qadir, and Hamid went on to become renowned musicians. Former khalifa.
- "Ghagge" Nazir Khan (c. 1835 - c. 1905) was born to Imam Khan, a Khandarbani dhrupadiya, in Agra. He learned vocal music from Waris Ali Khan (Qawwal Bacchon Gharana). He served as court musician to Jodhpur, Gwalior, and Bhopal states. He taught music to Pandit Natthhulal, Pandit Chimmanlal, Munavvar Khan (brother.
- Chimanlal Pandit (c. 1850s-c. 1890s), learned from Ghagge Nazir Khan.
- Natthulal Pandit (c. 1850s-c. 1920s), learned from Ghagge Nazir Khan.
- Munavvar Khan (c. 1860s-c. 1930s), learned from Ghagge Nazir Khan (primarily) and Wahid Khan. Former khalifa.
- Majid Khan (c. 1880s-c. 1930s), first son and disciple of Wahid Khan, proficient in sitar and rudra veena.
- Latif Khan (c. 1880s-1935), second son and disciple of Wahid Khan, proficient in rudra veena. Succeeded his father as a court musician of Indore for the Holkar Dynasty.
- Begum Hasibanbai (c. 1880s-c. 1950s), daughter of Wahid Khan, mother of Mohammed Khan, grandmother of Rais Khan.
- Saddan Khan (c. 1890s-1940s), third son and disciple of Wahid Khan, proficient in sitar.
- Pandit Motiram (1889-1934), nephew and disciple of Natthulal Pandit. Father and guru of Motiram, Pratap Narayan, and Jasraj.
- Pandit Jyotiram (1899-1944), younger brother and disciple of Pandit Motiram and Rajab Ali Khan. Father of Puranchand.

=== 20th century ===
- Jaiwant Singhji Waghela (1904-1980), disciple of Munavvar Khan and Ghulam Qadir Khan, proficient in rudra veena and singing. Developed aptitude as a musicologist. Guru of Pandit Motiram, Pandit Pratap Narayan, and Pandit Jasraj.
- Mohammed Khan (c. 1900s-1967), son of Begum Hasibanbai and disciple of Latif Khan, proficient in rudra veena, sitar, and surbahar. Father of Rais Khan.
- Pandit Maniram (1910-1985), son and disciple of Pandit Motiram. Also learned from Pandit Jyotiram. Guru and brother of Pratap Narayan and Jasraj. Father of Yogai Sharma, Vinod Pandit, and Dinesh Pandit.
- Ghulam Qadir Khan (1914-2002), second-youngest son of Wahid Khan, disciple of his father and uncle, Munavvar Khan. Proficient in singing and rudra veena. Former khalifa.
- Hamid Khan (c. 1918-2000), youngest son and disciple of Wahid Khan, proficient in rudra veena and sitar.
- Pandit Pratap Narayan (1918-2002), son and disciple of Pandit Motiram. Also learned from uncle, Pandit Jyotiram, and brother, Pandit Maniram.
- Mohammed Shafi (1925-1979), son of Majid Khan, proficient in sitar, composed and arranged music in the Hindi film industry. Brother-in-law of Vilayat Khan.
- Krishnakant Parikh (1924-2018), first student of Pandit Jasraj. Guru of his two sons, Niraj and Vikas, and grandson, Akshat.
- Pandit Puranchandra (1929-1991), son and disciple of Pandit Jyotiram. Also learned from Ghulam Qadir Khan and Abdul Kadir Khan of Agra Gharana.
- Pandit Jasraj (1930-2020), son and disciple of Pandit Motiram. Learned primarily from brothers Pandit Maniram and Pandit Pratap Narayan. Also learned from Jaiwant Singhji Waghela.
- Begum Kaniz Fatima (1934-2018), only daughter of Latif Khan. Mother of Siraj Khan.
- Mukund Lath (1937-2020), disciple of Pandit Motiram and Pandit Jasraj. Celebrated musicologist and historian.
- Rais Khan (1939-2017), son and disciple of Mohammed Khan, proficient in sitar and surbahar (nephew of Vilayat Khan) Former khalifa.
- Yogai Sharma (b. 1940), daughter and disciple of Pandit Maniram. Married Askaran Sharma.
- Begum Nilofer Khan (c. 1940s-c. 2010s), daughter and disciple of Mohammed Khan, proficient in sitar and surbahar. Also leaerned from Ghulam Qadir Khan.
- Shobha Abhyankar (1946-2014), disciple of Pandit Jasraj. Guru of her son, Sanjeev Abhyankar, and Sandeep Ranade. Also learned from Gangadharbuwa Pimpalkhare and V. R. Athavale.
- Girish Wazalwar (b. 1947), disciple of Pandit Jasraj.
- Chandrashekhar Swami (b. 1940s), disciple of Pandit Jasraj. Also studied with Swami Vallabhdas.
- Asha Lohia (b. 1940s), disciple of Pandit Jasraj and sister-in-law of Mukund Lath.
- Vinod Pandit (1952-2001), son and disciple of Pandit Maniram who became an actor.
- Siraj Khan (b. 1956), son of Begum Kaniz Fatima and disciple of Vilayat Khan, Rais Khan, and Ghulam Qadir Khan. Current khalifa.
- Dinesh Pandit (b. 1956), son and disciple of Pandit Maniram, proficient in tabla and percussions. Also a music composer.
- Jatin Pandit (b. 1950s), son and disciple of Pandit Pratap Narayan. Acclaimed music composer for Hindi cinema. Collaborated with brother, Lalit.
- Lalit Pandit (b. 1950s), son and disciple of Pandit Pratap Narayan. Acclaimed music composer for Hindi cinema. Collaborated with brother, Jatin.
- Radharaman Kirtane (b. 1957), disciple of Pandit Jasraj.
- Shahid Khan (b. c. 1950s), younger son of Begum Kaniz Fatima, proficient in violin. Active in Hindi film industry, working alongside R. D. Burman, Laxmikant-Pyarelal, Rajesh Roshan, and Anu Malik, among others.
- Madhup Mudgal (b. c. 1950s), disciple of Pandit Jasraj. Son and disciple of Vinay Chandra Maudgalya who also studied with Kumar Gandharva.
- Arawind Thatte (b. 1958), disciple of Pandit Jasraj, proficient in harmonium.
- Ramesh Narayan (b. 1959), disciple of Pandit Jasraj.
- Gargee Siddhant Dutta (b. 1960s), disciple of Pandit Jasraj.
- Tripti Mukherjee (b. 1960s), disciple of Pandit Jasraj.
- Shaarang Dev Pandit (b. 1963), son and disciple of Pandit Jasraj. Worked as a music composer in film and television.
- Durga Jasraj (b. 1964), daughter and disciple of Pandit Jasraj. Worked as a model, actress, and television host.
- Kala Ramnath (b. 1967), disciple of Pandit Jasraj, proficient in violin. Niece of N. Rajam and T. N. Krishnan.
- Lokesh Anand (b. 1978), disciple of Pandit Jasraj, proficient in Shehnai.
- Shweta Jhaveri (b. 1960s), disciple of Pandit Jasraj.
- Suman Ghosh (b. 1967), disciple of Pandit Jasraj.
- Hemang Mehta (b. 1968), disciple of Pandit Jasraj.
- Sanjeev Abhyankar (b. 1969), disciple of Pandit Jasraj. Son and disciple of Shobha Abhyankar. Also learned from Gangadharbuwa Pimpalkhare.
- Rattan Mohan Sharma (b. 1971), nephew and disciple of Pandit Jasraj.
- Gautam Kale (b. 1970s), disciple of Pandit Jasraj. Also learned from Vishwanath Rao Ringe.
- Dilip Gavaiya (b. 1978), son and disciple of Pandit Puranchandra.

=== 21st century ===
- Sandeep Ranade (b. 1981), disciple of Pandit Jasraj and Shobha Abhyankar. Also learned from Anjali Joglekar-Ponkshe.
- Saptarshi Chakraborty (b. 1981), disciple of Pandit Jasraj.
- Pritam Bhattacharjee (b. 1981), disciple of Pandit Jasraj.
- Asad Khan (b. 1982), son and disciple of Siraj Khan, proficient in sitar.
- Shahraaz Khan (b. 1980s), son and disciple of Siraj Khan. Works as a composer and arranger for film and television.
- Amit Arya (b. 1980s), disciple of Asha Lohia, Hemang Mehta, Tripti Mukherjee, and Pandit Jasraj.
- Adwait Joshi (b. 1980s), disciple of Pritam Bhattacharjee.
- Ankita Joshi (b. 1988), disciple of Pandit Jasraj.
- Aly Sunderji (b. 1988), disciple of Rattan Mohan Sharma.
- Aarshin Karande (b. 1992), disciple of Vasu Sundarraj, Sandeep Ranade, Amit Kavthekar, and Siraj Khan.
- Aditya Shah (b. 1993), disciple of Radharaman Kirtane and Rattan Mohan Sharma.
- Akshat Parikh (b. 1990s), disciple of Krishnakant Parikh. Works as a music supervisor for film and television.
- Swar Sharma (b. 2000), son of Pandit Rattan Mohan Sharma, great-nephew and disciple of Pandit Jasraj.
- Azaan Khan (b. 2000s), son and disciple of Asad Khan.

== See also ==
- Music of Haryana
