= Pandit Motiram =

- Born: 1889
- Origin: Pili Mandori, Fatehabad District, Haryana, India
- Died: 24 April 1934 (aged 44)
- Genres: Khayal, Dhrupad, Dhamar, Haveli Sangeet, Bhajan, Thumri, Tappa
- Occupation: Vocalist
- Years active: 1900s–1934

Shri Pandit Motiram (1899 – 24 April 1934), sometimes referred to as Motiram Pandit and Moti Prasad, was an Indian classical vocalist from the Mewati gharana. Pandit is known for being the father and guru of popular musicians Pandit Jasraj, Pandit Maniram, and Pandit Pratap Narayan. His legacy has been commemorated since 1972 annually at Hyderabad, where he was appointed a court musician, in the Pandit Motiram Pandit Maniram Sangeet Samaroh.

A disciple of the Mewati tradition, Pandit's popularity grew through jugalbandi performances with his younger brother and disciple, Pandit Jyotiram, who were known together as Moti-Jyoti.

== Background ==
Pandit lost his father at an early age. He and his brother, Jyotiram, were adopted by their maternal uncle, Pandit Natthulal, a disciple of Ustad Ghagge Nazir Khan. Pandit and his brother were trained in music by him.

=== Career ===
He served as a court musician to Maharaja Pratap Singh in the Kashmir Darbar. He left after some friction with the Dewan and invited by the Nizam of Hyderabad Osman Ali Khan to be his court musician.

=== Death ===
On 24 April 1944, Pandit died unexpectedly for unknown reasons on the day he was supposed to become the court musician of Osman Ali Khan, the Nizam of Hyderabad.

== Legacy ==
=== Music Contributions ===
Pandit is not known to have created any ragas. His khayal and bhajan compositions remain popular today. He was known for composing in aprachalit ragas. These include:

- "Brija Banavāri, chailā mohe nisadina kunja meṃ roke;" khayal in Raga Abiri Todi.
- "Laī jā re badarā sandesavā;" khayal in Raga Hansadhwani.
- "Pavana pūta Hanumāna lalā tuma;" khayal in Raga Hansadhwani.
- "Gale bhujaṃga bhasma aṃga," bhajan in Raga Desh.
- "Tuma bina mila mohe chain parata nāhīṃ;" khayal in Raga Bageshri Kanada.
- "Hamko bisāra kahān cale salone saiyāṃ;" khayal in Raga Nagadhwani Kanada.
- "Eri mā sakala bana gagana pavana calata puravāī re;" khayal in Raga Khamaj Bahar.
- "Jaya jaya jaya Suta Maheśa;" khayal in Raga Kedar.
- "Suno Bansiwale binatī hamārī;" bandish ki thumri based on Raga Bageshri.
- "Kāhe śora macāve;" khayal in Raga Ahir Bhairav.

=== Disciples ===
Pandit's foremost disciplines were his three sons, Maniram, Pratap Narayan, and Jasraj.

== Personal life ==
Pandit married Krishna Meghe. They had nine children together, two of whom died prematurely. This included Maniram (son), Padma (daughter), Pratap Narayan (son), Rama (daughter), Rajaram (son), Pushpa (daughter), and Jasraj (son).
