= Kala Ramnath =

Indian classical violinist

- Born: Chennai, Tamil Nadu, India
- Genres: Hindustani classical music
- Occupation: Violinist
- Instrument: Violin
- Website: kalaramnath.com

Kala Ramnath is an Indian classical violinist. She belongs to the Mewati gharana, a lineage of musicians. She was awarded the Sangeet Natak Academy Puraskaar in 2016, Rashtriya Kumar Gandharva Sanman in 2008 and the Pandit Jasraj Gaurav Puraskar in 1999.

== Early life ==
Kala Ramnath is the first child of Malathy and T.N. Mani in Chennai, India. Kala Ramnath was born into a family that includes violinists T. N. Krishnan and N. Rajam. Her father, T.N. Mani was known for his contributions to Indian film music.

At the age of two and a half, Kala Ramnath was initiated into violin and vocal training by her grandfather, Narayan Iyer. She represents the beginning of the seventh generation of violinists in her family. It has been said that her grandfather bribed her to practice by offering her sweets and candy.

She started performing from the age of 14 when her aunt presented her in concert.

For fifteen years she studied with the Mewati vocalist Pandit Jasraj.

== Performing career ==
Kala Ramnath has performed at all the major music festivals in India, as well as the most prestigious stages throughout the world, including the Sydney Opera House, London's Queen Elizabeth Hall and New York's Carnegie Hall to name a few.

She has forged musical alliances with artists of renown from different genres around the globe incorporating elements of Western classical, jazz, Flamenco and traditional African music.

Kala Ramnath is a sought after artist to work and experiment with orchestras such as the London Symphony and London Philharmonic. She has also worked with musicians including Kai Eckhart, Edgar Meyer, Bela Fleck, Hilary Hahn, Terry Bozzio, Abbos Kossimov, Ayrto Moreira, Giovanni Hidalgo and rock legend Ray Manzarek of the Doors.

‘Raga Afrika’, ‘Global Conversation’ and recently ‘Elements’ are all bands Ramnath has founded along with her fellow world music artists.

Kala Ramnath also has been involved in the background score of the Hollywood films, notable among them being Blood Diamond working with composers like James Newton Howard and George Acogny.

== Teaching career ==
Kala Ramnath regularly lectures and conducts workshops all around the world. A few worth mention here are the Rotterdam Conservatory of Music in Netherlands, University of Giessen in Germany and the Weill Institute in association with the Carnegie Hall in New York.

She is keen to enrich the lives of under-privileged and sick children through music in the form of her foundation, ‘Kalashree’.

On July 24, 2021 Kala started a website, indianclassicalmusic.com, to document Indian Classical Music in video format aiming to create the most authentic resource for Indian Classical Music.

== Awards ==
- Sangeet Natak Akademi Award

== Discography ==
- Samaya
- Touching Air
- Divine Wheel
- Nectar
- Kala
- Twilight Strings
- Kala Ramnath
- Young Masters
- Dharohar
- Raga & Rhythm
- Yashila Drive East
- Luminous
- Ragamala
- Ekta
- Samvad
- Passage Through Dawn
- Gifted Violinist
- Nishigandha
- Singing Violin
- Euphony & Cadence
- Aavartan
- Country Classics from India
- Yashila Reflections
