= Lokesh Anand =

Indian Shehnai Player (born 1978)

Pandit Lokesh Anand
- Born: Lokesh Anand; March 13, 1978 (age 48); Delhi, India
- Genre: Indian classical music
- Occupation: Musician
- Instrument: Shehnai
- Website: www.lokeshanand.com

Lokesh Anand (born 1978) is an Indian shehnai player. He studied with Sangeet Martand Pandit Jasraj and belongs to the Mewati Gharana.

Lokesh performs solo and in duet and also does fusion.

During the COVID-19 pandemic, he performed online.

== Biography ==
Anand was born in Delhi and started receiving training from his father Kalicharan at the age of eight.

Lokesh Anand married Payal Anand in 1999. They have two children.

== Performances ==
- Shri Ram Shanker Lal Music Festival
- Ustad Bade Ghulam Ali Khan Music Festival
- Akashvani sangeet sammelan

== Played Shehnai in Movie and Background music ==
- Shehnai In Background Score Mira, Royal Detective season-3
- in the song "Khelo khellum under Aman pant" in Lust Stories 2, a 2023 Netflix production,.
- Little Things Season 3 on Netflix and Dice Media

== Awards and recognition ==
- Ustad Bharat Ratna Bismillah Khan award 2024
- Shehnai Ratna Award in 2010
- Sangeet Ratna in 2005
- Nomination for “GIMA” Awards for Swan-Lake Op20
