= Sanjeev Abhyankar =

Pt. Sanjeev Abhyankar
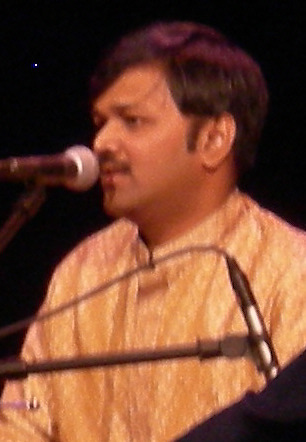

Background information
- Born: Sanjeev Abhyankar; 5 October 1969 (age 57); Pune, Maharashtra, India
- Genres: Khayal, Bhajans
- Occupations: Indian Classical and Devotional Singer
- Instrument: Vocal
- Years active: 1980–1983, 1989–present
- Website: www.sanjeevabhyankar.com

Pandit Sanjeev Abhyankar (born 5 October 1969) is a Hindustani classical music vocalist of the Mewati Gharana. Trained under Pandit Jasraj, he was a child prodigy and started his singing career at age 11. Since then has recorded over 60 solo albums and performed in over 200 cities across the world.

He won the National Film Award for Best Male Playback Singer in 1999 for his song, Suno Re Bhaila, in the Hindi film, Godmother and also the Kumar Gandharva National Award 2008 from the Govt. of Madhya Pradesh for sustained excellence in the field of Classical Arts.

== Early life and musical training ==
Abhyankar was born in Pune, Maharashtra, India to Shobha Abhyankar, a musicologist and teacher of the Mewati Gharana. He started learning Hindustani classical music at the age of eight, groomed by his mother, followed by his guru Pandit Gangadharbua Pimpalkhare of the Gwalior Gharana and later from Pandit Jasraj (Mewati Gharana).

== Career ==
Abhyankar rendered his first stage performance in Mumbai at the age of 11 in 1981. Sanjeev has given vocal for Essence of Life, a dance group conceptualized by Dega Deva Kumar Reddy to spread Jiddu Krishnamurti's teachings across India.

== Awards ==
- 1998: National Film Award: Best Male Playback Singer: Godmother ("Suno Re Bhaila")
- 2009: Kumar Gandharva Samman

== Film discography ==
- Tum Gaye (with Lata Mangeshkar), Maachis [1996]
- Yeh Hai Shaan Banaras Ki, Banaras (2005)
- Lai Ja Re Badra, Dil Pe Mat Le Yaar (2000)
- Sada Sumiran Karle, Dashavatar (2008)
- Suno Re Suno Re Bhayina Ke, Godmother (1998)
- Rukhe Naina, Maqbool (2003)
- Tu Astis Tar, Coffee Ani Barach Kahi (2015)
