= Pandit Jasraj Institute for Music, Research, Artistry and Appreciation =

US non-profit organization

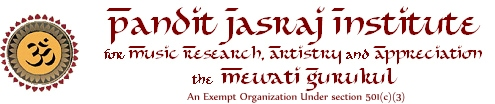
Logo

The Pandit Jasraj Institute for Music, Research, Artistry and Appreciation (PJIM) is a non-profit 501(c)(3) institute that fosters the preservation, growth and teaching of Indian classical music in the tradition of the Mewati gharana, named after Jasraj. The institute is based in New Hyde Park (New York) and has branches in Manhattan (New York), Edison (New Jersey) and Pittsburgh (Pennsylvania).

== Activities ==
The institute organizes an annual workshop titled Shibir, publishes the JasRangi Magazine and organizes artistes' concerts.

== See also ==
- Pandit Jasraj Institute of Music Toronto, based in the Greater Toronto Area
