= Suman Ghosh =

Pandit Suman Ghosh
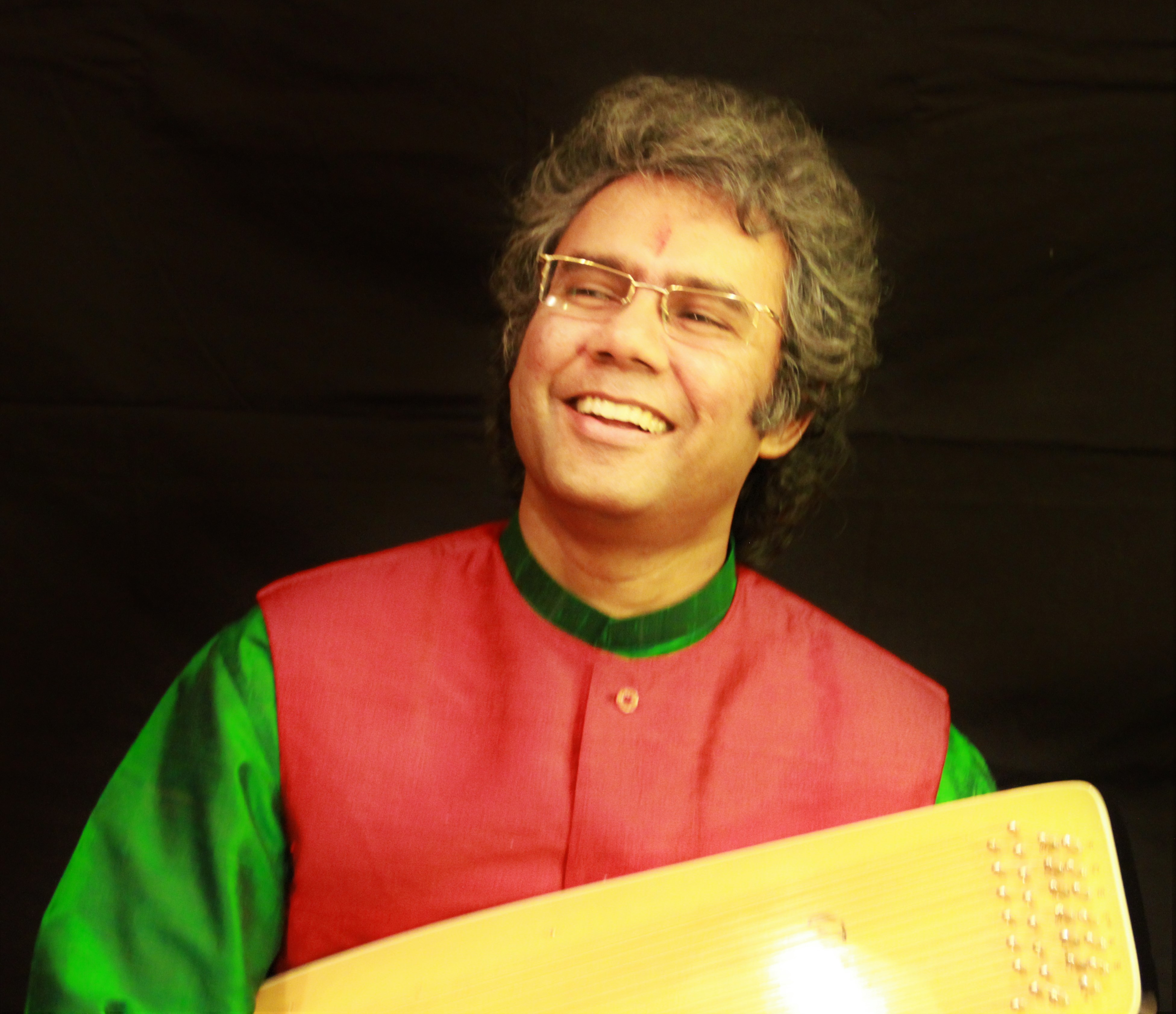

Background information
- Born: Pandit Suman Ghosh; 6 January 1967 (age 59)
- Origin: India
- Genres: Hindustani classical music, Mewati Gharana
- Occupation: Classical vocalist
- Website: Official site

Pandit Suman Ghosh (born 6 January 1967) is an Indian vocalist of Hindustani classical music from the Mewati Gharana. He is the founder and president of the Centre for Indian Classical Music of Houston (CICMH).

== Early life ==
Ghosh was born on 6 January 1967 to Smt. Monica Ghosh and Shri Biman Krishna Ghosh.

He earned a bachelor's and a master's degree from the University of Calcutta.

== Career ==
=== Performance ===
Ghosh gave his first full concert at the age of 12. He performed as a part of the Mewati Gharana of Hindustani Classical music and was named 'Acharya Varishta' by the Sangeet Martand in 2008.

=== Other works ===
Ghosh has conducted research in ethnomusicology and was invited to present his research at the annual International Association of Sound and Audiovisual Archives (IASA) conference held in Vienna, Austria in 1999, in celebration of 100 years of sound archiving.

He founded the Centre for Indian Classical Music of Houston (CICMH), Houston, United States, 2008.

== Awards and recognition ==
- 2016 – Reception by the Honourable Consul General of India in recognition of his work as a true Ambassador of Indian Culture
- 2015 – Lifetime Achievement Award, NABC (35th North American Bengali Conf.), July 2015, "A Night of Musical Bliss", Times of India
- 2014 – "Virtuoso performer", concert review, Times of India
- 2011 – Proclamation from the Office of the Mayor of City of Sugar Land for Ghosh's "tireless efforts and motivation on preserving and keeping the ancient Indian tradition alive for present and future generations"
- 2010 – Tagore Award, India Culture Centre of Houston and the Indian consulate
- 2008 – Acharya Varishtha, bestowed by Padma Vibhushan Pandit Jasraj, 2008
