= Bruce MacCombie =

American classical composer

Bruce MacCombie (1943 in Providence, Rhode Island – May 2, 2012, in Amherst, Massachusetts) was an American composer.

He studied at the University of Massachusetts Amherst and Freiburg Conservatory, and holds a Ph.D. in music from the University of Iowa. He was appointed to the music faculty of Yale University in 1975, and one year later joined the composition faculty of the Yale School of Music.

MacCombie was Director of Publications for G. Schirmer and Associated Music Publishers from 1980 to 1986, Dean of the Juilliard School from 1986 to 1992 and Dean of the School for the Arts at Boston University from 1992 to 2001. Since 2002 he has been Professor of Music at the University of Massachusetts Amherst at Amherst.

His compositions include Nightshade Rounds (1979) for solo guitar (written for Sharon Isbin), Leaden Echo, Golden Echo (1989) for soprano and orchestra, the set of choral pieces Color and Time (1990), Chelsea Tango (1991) for orchestra, and the quintet Greeting (1993) (written for Krzysztof Penderecki's 60th birthday).

MacCombie was named Executive Director of Jazz at Lincoln Center in 2001. He was succeeded by Derek Gordon in 2004.
