= Sharon Isbin =

American classical guitarist and educator

Isbin
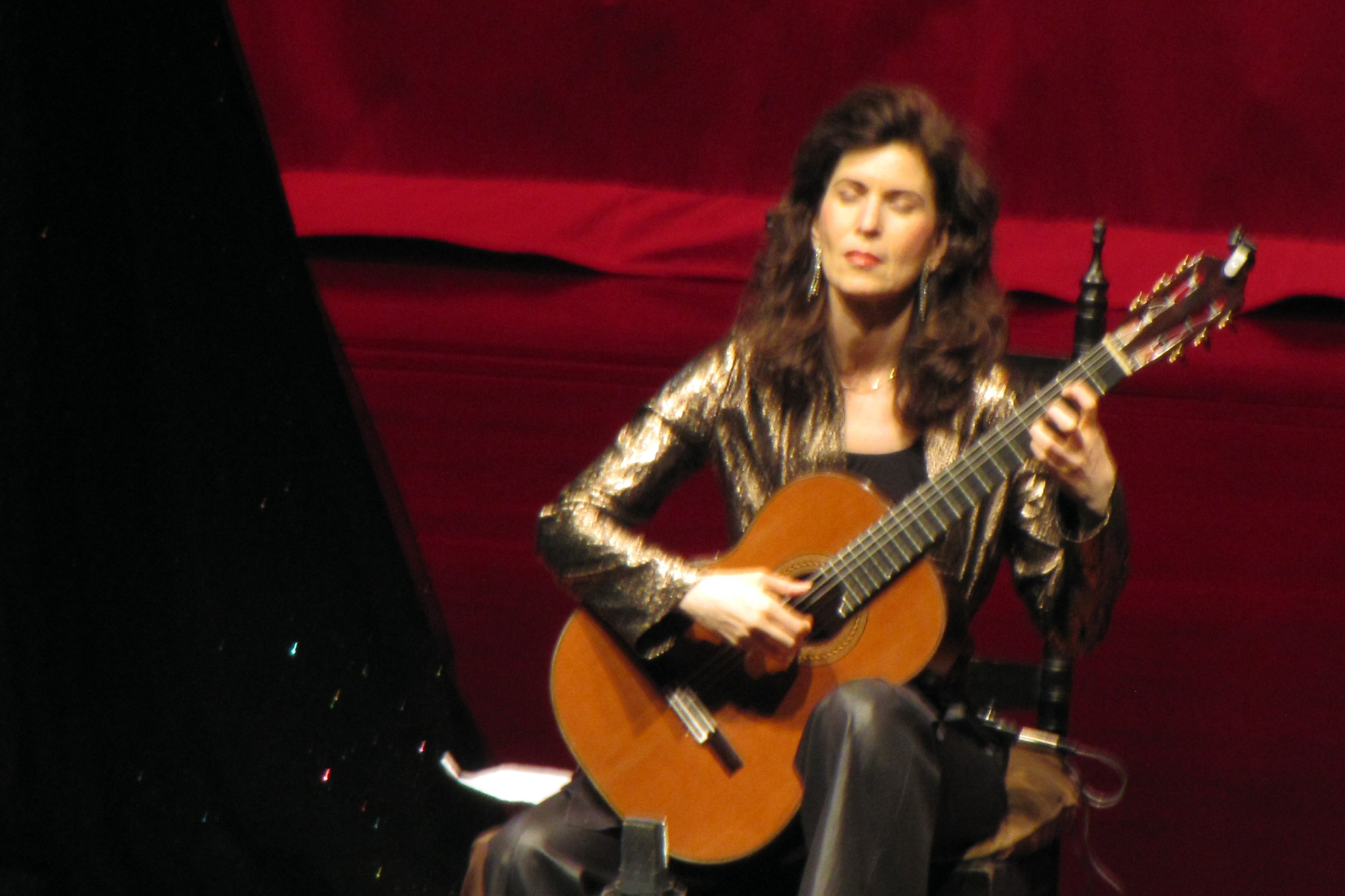
- Sharon Isbin in 2011

Background information
- Born: August 7, 1956 (age 70); Minneapolis, Minnesota, U.S.
- Genres: Classical, folk
- Occupation: Musician
- Instrument: Classical guitar
- Years active: 1970–present
- Labels: Sony Classics, Warner Classics, Cedille Records, Bridge Records, Zoho Music, Concord Records, Video Artists International
- Website: www.sharonisbin.com

Sharon Isbin (born August 7, 1956) is a Grammy Award winning classical guitarist and the founder and director of the guitar department at the Juilliard School.

== Personal life and education ==
Sharon Isbin was born in Minneapolis, Minnesota to Katherine Brudnoy, an attorney, and Herbert S. Isbin, a nuclear scientist and professor at the University of Minnesota. She began her guitar studies at the age of nine with Aldo Minella when her father was on sabbatical in Varese, Italy. Upon her families return to America she later studied with Jeffrey Van and Sophocles Papas in Washington, D.C. She received private lessons with Andrés Segovia and attended masterclasses with Oscar Ghiglia and Alirio Díaz.

She received a B.A. cum laude from Yale University and a Master of Music (M.M.) from the Yale School of Music. There she studied general music with the renowned Bach scholar and artist Rosalyn Turreck as Yale had yet to establish a guitar program.

== Career ==
=== Performing and recording ===
In 1974 Sharon Isbin gave her first European tour at the age of 17. In 1975 she won the first prize in Guitar '75 held in Toronto Canada which was followed by tours through England and Japan. In 1979 she made her Alice Tully Hall premier in New York and as a winner of Queen Sofia 1979 International Competition she performed Joaquin Rodrigo's Concierto de Aranjuez with the Spanish National Radio Orchestra on live television.

In the 1980s Sharon Isbin recorded and toured frequently. An early champion of the works of Leo Brouwer she was the dedicatee of Brouwer's El Decameron Negro. In 1984 she released new editions of J.S. Bach's Lute Suites in collaboration with Rosalyn Turreck. The complete lute suites were recorded by Isbin in 1989. In the 1980s Isbin began her crossover work with Brazilian guitarist Laurindo Almeida and jazz guitarist Larry Coryell.

In the 1990s Sharon Isbin turned attention to the works of Latin American composers as well as commissioning many new works for the classical guitar. She received a 1999 Grammy nomination for "Best Classical Crossover Album" for her recording Journey to the Amazon. She played on Aaron Jay Kernis' Double Concerto with violinist Cho-Liang Lin and the Saint Paul Chamber Orchestra. This album received a Grammy nomination in 2000 for "Best Contemporary Classical Composition" for Kernis' Air for Violin.

In the 2000s Sharon Isbin won a Grammy in 2001 for her album Dreams of a World: Folk-Inspired Music for Guitar (Warner Classics), becoming the first classical guitarist to win a Grammy in 28 years. On September 11, 2002, Isbin performed for the memorial tribute at Ground Zero, which was televised live throughout the world on international networks. Her recording of world premiere concertos written for her by Christopher Rouse and Tan Dun won a Grammy in 2002. In 2005, Isbin performed the world premiere with Steve Vai of his Blossom Suite composed for her at the Théâtre du Châtelet in Paris. She received a 2005 Latin Grammy nomination for "Best Classical Album" and a 2006 GLAAD Media Award nomination for "Outstanding Music Artist" for her recording of Joaquín Rodrigo's Concierto de Aranjuez with the New York Philharmonic. The recording also featured concertos by Mexican composer Manuel Ponce and Brazilian Heitor Villa-Lobos. Isbin was the first guitar soloist to perform with the New York Philharmonic in 26 years; this was the orchestra's first-ever recording with the guitar.In November 2009, Isbin performed at the White House by invitation of President Barack Obama and First Lady Michelle Obama.

In the 2010s Sharon Isbin continued her busy touring and recording schedule. In 2010, Isbin won a Grammy Award for Best Instrumental Soloist for her CD, Journey to the New World (Sony) in which Joan Baez and Mark O'Connor performed with her as guests. The album spent 63 consecutive weeks on Billboard charts and ranked as the number one bestselling classical CD on Amazon and iTunes during that time. In 2014, she performed a 20-city Guitar Passions tour with jazz musicians Stanley Jordan and Romero Lubambo. In 2015, she performed with Josh Groban on the PBS Billy Joel: Gershwin Prize concert, and was featured on the Tavis Smiley PBS television series in February 2015. The PBS American Public Television documentary Sharon Isbin: Troubadour won the 2015 ASCAP Television Broadcast Award and has aired internationally and on more than 200 PBS stations across the U.S.

=== Teaching and other work ===
After graduating from Yale in 1979 Sharon Isbin worked at Manhattan School of Music and Mannes School of Music. Later in 1989, Isbin founded the guitar program at Juilliard School first establishing the Master of Music degree, Graduate Diploma, and Artist Diploma programs for classical guitar and later the Bachelor of Music and DMA degree programs. Isbin also serves as the director of the Guitar Department at the Aspen Music Festival which she created in 1993. Isbin's students include Antigoni Goni, Kevin Gallagher and Colin Davin among others.

Isbin began practicing the Transcendental Meditation at age 17. On November 5, 2015, the David Lynch Foundation organized a benefit concert at New York City's Carnegie Hall named "Change Begins Within," to promote transcendental meditation for stress control. Sharon Isbin participated alongside Katy Perry, Sting, Jerry Seinfeld, Angelique Kidjo, and Jim James.

Isbin is the author of the Classical Guitar Answer Book which is a reprinting of her columns written for Acoustic Guitar Magazine and concert programs.

=== Awards and nominations ===
Awards and Recognitions

- Won first prize at the Toronto Guitar Competition (1975)
- Won second prize in Munich ARD International Music Competition (1976)
- A winner of the Madrid Queen Sofia International Competition (1979)
- Germany's Echo Klassik Award (2002)
- Concert Artists Guild Virtuoso Award (2013)
- Musical America's Instrumentalist of the Year. (2020)
- JoAnn Falletta International Guitar Concerto Competition Lifetime Achievement Award (2020)
- Guitar Foundation of America HALL OF FAME and Artistic Achievement Award (2023)

== Awards ==
=== Grammy ===
- 1999: Grammy nomination for Best Classical Crossover Album, Journey to the Amazon
- 2000: Grammy nomination, Kernis: Double Concerto for Violin and Guitar with Cho-Liang Lin and the Saint Paul Chamber Orchestra
- 2001: Grammy Award for Best Instrumental Soloist, Dreams of a World
- 2002: Grammy Award for Rouse: Concert de Gaudi
- 2005: Latin Grammy nomination for Best Classical Album, Rodrigo: Concierto de Aranjuez; Villa-Lobos: Concerto for guitar; Ponce: Concierto del Sur with the New York Philharmonic
- 2010: Grammy Award for Best Instrumental Soloist, Journey to the New World

=== Other awards ===
- Toronto Guitar competition, first prize, 1975
- Winner Munich ARD International Music Competition, 1976
- Madrid Queen Sofia International Competition, 1979
- Echo Klassik Award, Winner Best Concert Recording, 2002
- Best Classical Guitarist, Guitar Player magazine
- Concert Artists Guild Virtuoso Award, 2013
- ASCAP Television Broadcast Award, 2015
- Little Orchestra Society's Artistic Excellence Award, 2019
- Musical America 2020 Instrumentalist of the Year Award
- Guitar Foundation of America HALL OF FAME and Artistic Achievement Award, 2023

== Discography ==
Compact Discs (CDs)
Date	Title	Label	Catalog number	Format	Total Playing Time	Notes
1978	Sharon Isbin Classical Guitar	Sound Environment	TR-1010	1 LP		Music by Brouwer, Ponce, Sor, Lauro, Albeniz
1980	Sharon Isbin Classical Guitar Vol. II	Sound Environment	TR-1013	1 LP		Music by Bach, Britten, Brouwer
1981	Sharon Isbin Spanish Works for Guitar	Denon	OF-7012-ND	1 LP		With Tokyo Metropolitan Symphony; music by Tarrega, Sainz de la Maza, Rodrigo "Concierto de Aranjuez"
1981	Sharon Isbin Guitar Recital	Denon	OX-7224-ND	1 LP		Music by Dodgson, MacCombie, Scarlatti, Bach
1984	Dances for Guitar	Pro Arte	CDD 343	1 CD/LP		Music by Barrios Mangore, Rodrigo, Lauro, Vianna, Savio, Turina, Granados, Castelnuovo-Tedesco
1985	3 Guitars 3	Pro Arte	CDD 235	1 CD/LP		With Larry Coryell and Laurindo Almeida; music by Nazareth, Gnattali, de Falla, Almeida, Rodrigo, Coryell
1987	Brazil, With Love	Concord	CCD-4320	1 CD/LP		With Carlos Barbosa-Lima; music by Jobim, Nazareth, Vianna
1988	Rhapsody in Blue/West Side Story	Concord	CCD-42012	1 CD/LP		With Carlos Barbosa-Lima; music by Gershwin and Bernstein
1989	J.S. Bach Complete Lute Suites	EMI/Virgin Classics	VC 7 90712-2	1 CD (DDD)	78:45	Sharon Isbin performs landmark editions for guitar created in collaboration with Rosalyn Tureck
1990	Road to the Sun	EMI/Virgin Classics	VC 7-59591-2	1 CD		Music by Sainz de la Maza, Rodrigo, Barrios Mangore, Abreu, Jobim, Tarrega, Brouwer, Villa-Lobos, Albeniz
1991	Love Songs & Lullabies	EMI/Virgin Classics	VC 7-91750-2	1 CD		With soprano Benita Valente, baritone Thomas Allen, organic percussionist Thiago de Mello
1991	Rodrigo: Concierto de Aranjuez	EMI/Virgin Classics	07777-59024-2	1 CD		Sharon Isbin with Orchestre de Chambre de Lausanne conducted by Lawrence Foster in Rodrigo Fantasia para un gentilhombre, Concierto de Aranjuez and Vivaldi Concerto in D Major
1994	Nightshade Rounds	EMI/Virgin Classics	VC 5 45024 2	1 CD (DDD)		Five bagatelles/ William Walton (13:54) – Nightshade rounds / Bruce MacCombie (10:06) – Preludes for piano/ George Gershwin;arr. Carlos Barbosa-Lima (5:48) – Clocks/ Joan Tower (9:07) – Folk song from English suite : op. 31/ John W. Duarte (4:20) – Nocturnal : op. 70/ Benjamin Britten (17:53).
1995	American Landscapes	EMI/Angel	72435-67672-2	1 CD (DDD)		With Saint Paul Chamber Orchestra conducted by Hugh Wolff. World premiere recording of concertos written for Sharon Isbin by John Corigliano, Joseph Schwantner and Lukas Foss.
1995	Black Topaz	New World Records	9322-80470-2	1 CD		With flutist Carol Wincenc performing world premiere recording of Snow Dreams by Joan Tower written for Isbin and Wincenc.
1995	The Slatkin Years: St. Louis Symphony Orchestra	LSC	LSC 51204	1 CD		Sharon Isbin and St. Louis Symphony Orchestra conducted by Leonard Slatkin—World Premiere live in concert January 1988 of Joseph Schwantner From Afar...A Fantasy for Guitar & Orchestra commissioned by SLSO for Sharon Isbin
1997	Journey to the Amazon	Warner Classics	0630-19899-2	1 CD		With Paul Winter, and Gaudencio Thiago de Mello. Music by Almeida, Lauro, Barrios Mangore, Thiago de Mello, Montana, Savio, Brouwer, Canonico, Vianna. 1999 GRAMMY Nomination
1998	Wayfaring Stranger	Warner Classics	3984-23419-2	1 CD		With mezzo-soprano Susanne Mentzer, music by Schubert, Seiber, Niles, Sainz de la Maza, Rodrigo, Granados, Martini, Tarrega,
1999	Ami Maayani: Viola & Guitar Concerti	FONS	FONS 36-2007	1 CD		Sharon Isbin with the Jerusalem Symphony Orchestra conducted by Kazuhiro Koizumi—Live in Concert in Jerusalem November 1979
1999	Kernis Double Concerto for Violin & Guitar	Decca/Argo	289-460226-2	1 CD		With violinist Cho-Liang Lin and the Saint Paul Chamber Orchestra conducted by Hugh Wolff. World premiere recording of concerto written for Sharon Isbin by Aaron Jay Kernis.
1999	Dreams of a World	Warner Classics	3984-25736-2	1 CD (DDD)		Folk-inspired Music for Guitar. 8 World Premieres; Music from Appalachia, Ireland, Greece, Israel, Spain, Cuba, Venezuela and Brazil. 2001 GRAMMY AWARD
2001	Rouse: Concert de Gaudí/Tan Dun: Guitar Concerto Yi2	Warner Classics	8573-81830-2	1 CD (DDD)		With the Gulbenkian Orchestra conducted by Muhai Tang. World premiere recording of concertos written for Sharon Isbin. 2002 GRAMMY AWARD, ECHO KLASSIK AWARD
2002	Sharon Isbin's Greatest Hits	Warner Classics	2435-62075-5	2 CDs		Rodrigo, Vivaldi, Bach, Albeniz, Barrios, Villa-Lobos, Foss
2003	Sharon Isbin Plays Baroque Favorites for Guitar	Warner Classics	0927-45312-2	1 CD		With the Zurich Chamber Orchestra and Howard Griffiths (conductor), music by Bach, Vivaldi, Albinoni
2004	Sharon Isbin – Artist Portrait	Warner Classics	2564-61591-2	1 CD		Music by Vivaldi, Bach, Rodrigo, Sainz de la Maza, Lauro, Almeida, Thiago de Mello, Niles, Tan Dun, Albinoni, Takemitsu, Tarrega, Martini, Schubert, Rouse
2005	Rodrigo: Concierto de Aranjuez; Villa-Lobos: Concerto for guitar; Ponce: Concierto del sur	Warner Classics	2564-60296-2	1 CD		With the New York Philharmonic conducted by José Serebrier. 2005 LATIN GRAMMY Nomination
2006	The Departed	New Line	39078	1 CD		Howard Shore's soundtrack to Martin Scorsese's Academy Award-winning film. 2008 GRAMMY Nomination
2009	Journey to the New World	Sony Classical	88697-45456-2	1 CD		Guest artists: folk singer Joan Baez and violinist Mark O'Connor. 2010 GRAMMY AWARD
2011	Sharon Isbin & Friends: Guitar Passions	Sony Classical	88697-84219-2	1 CD		Guest artists: Steve Vai, Stanley Jordan, Nancy Wilson, Steve Morse, Romero Lubambo, Rosa Passos, Thiago de Mello, Paul Winter
2011	Sharon Isbin - Great Masterworks of the Guitar	Warner Classics	50999-083412-2	4 CDs		Rodrigo Concerti, Schwantner Concerto, Nightshade Rounds, Romances for Guitar, JS Bach Complete Lute Suites
2014	Sharon Isbin: 5 Classic Albums	Warner Classics	2564-62436-4	5 CDs		Journey to the Amazon, Dreams of a World, Baroque Favorites, Rouse-Tan Dun Concertos, Rodrigo/Villa-Lobos/Ponce Concertos with New York Philharmonic
2015	Sharon Isbin: Troubadour	Video Artists International	DVD 4580	Blu-ray 8202		Award-winning documentary presented by American Public Television. Guests include Joan Baez, First Lady Michelle Obama, Martina Navratilova, Garrison Keillor, Steve Vai, Stanley Jordan, Mark O'Connor, John Corigliano, Christopher Rouse, Tan Dun, Joan Tower, Romero Lubambo, David Hyde Pierce, Janis Ian & more. WINNER 2015 ASCAP TELEVISION BROADCAST AWARD
2017	Alma Española: Isabel Leonard & Sharon Isbin	Bridge Records	9491	1 CD		Composers: Federico García Lorca, Joaquín Rodrigo, Agustín Lara, Manuel de Falla, Xavier Montsalvatge, Francisco Tárrega, Enrique Granados
2019	Souvenirs of Spain & Italy: Sharon Isbin & Pacifica Quartet	Cedille Records	CDR 90000 190	1 CD		Composers: Castelnuovo-Tedesco, Vivaldi, Turina, Boccherini
2020	AFFINITY: World Premiere Recordings	Zoho Music	ZM 202005	1 CD		Guest artists: Maryland Symphony Orchestra & conductor Elizabeth Schulze; Isabel Leonard, voice; Colin Davin, guitar
2020	STRINGS FOR PEACE: Premieres for Guitar & Sarod	Zoho Music	ZM 202004	1 CD		Sharon Isbin with Amjad Ali Khan, Amaan Ali Bangash, Ayaan Ali Bangash, sarods; Amit Kavthekar, tabla
2024	LIVE IN ASPEN: Recorded Live in Concert at the Aspen Music Festival	Zoho Music	ZM 202405	1 CD		Sharon Isbin with Amjad Ali Khan, Amaan Ali Bangash, Ayaan Ali Bangash, sarods; Amit Kavthekar, tabla
2025	ROMÁNTICO	KL2	KLM026	1 CD		Sharon Isbin with Orchestra of St. Luke's & conductor Enrico Lopez-Yañez World Premiere recordings of Latin dance-inspired music for guitar by Karen LeFrak including her Miami Concerto for Guitar & Orchestra
