= Ali Razwan =

Indian Classical Musician

Dr. Ali F. M. Razwan
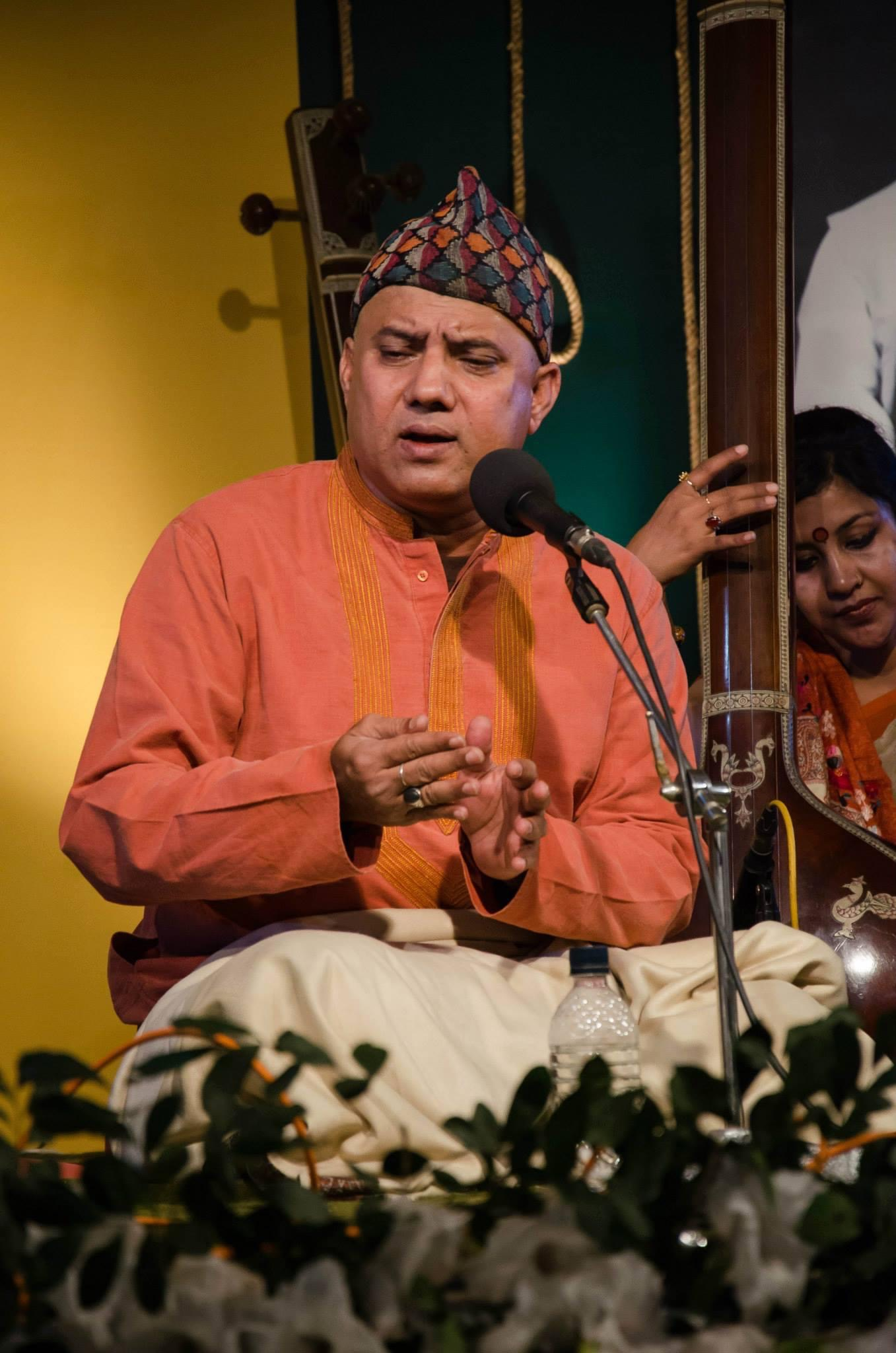
- Razwan performing

Background information
- Genres: Hindustani classical music
- Occupations: Hindustani classical Vocalist, Musicologist
- Years active: 1983–present

Ali F. M. Razwan is an Indian classical musician in the Hindustani tradition. He belongs to the Gwalior-Jaipur-Agra gharana.

Ali is the only non-Indian to have received the Sangeet Acharya degree. Dr. Ali's style of rendition has influences from laya, chhanda, bolbaat, boltan, layakari of Gwalior, and Binkari alap.

== Early life ==
Ali F. M. Razwan was born as the sixth child of A. B. Lutfi Ali.

At the age of fifteen, Ali commenced music lessons from Bholanath Bhattacharya of Magura at the Shilpakala Academy. Subsequently, until 1983, he studied under Professor Chandi Prashad Chatarjee. From 1984 to 1988, he was under the tutelage of Ustad Abdul Bari Khan. Concurrently, he received training in Nazrul Sangeet at Bulbul Lalitakala Academy.

Ali was awarded the ICCR scholarship in 1988 and pursued Bachelors and Masters degrees at the Maharaja Sayajirao University of Baroda. There, he received training in classical music of the Gwalior gharana from musicians like Pandit Shikantha Garage, Pandit Anilbhai Vaishnav, Pandit Ishwarbhai Yadav, and Pandit Dwarakanath Bhosle. He also studied Jaipur gharana under Subhada Desai and Kirana gharana under Pandit Lakshmikant Pyarelal Bapat. He learned Nauhar bani (stylistic variants) Dhrupad Sangeet from Pandit Harishchandra Chaturvedi during his research in Mumbai and trained under Pandit V. R. Athavale and Pandit Arun Kashalkar in Gwalior gharana-Jaipur gharana.

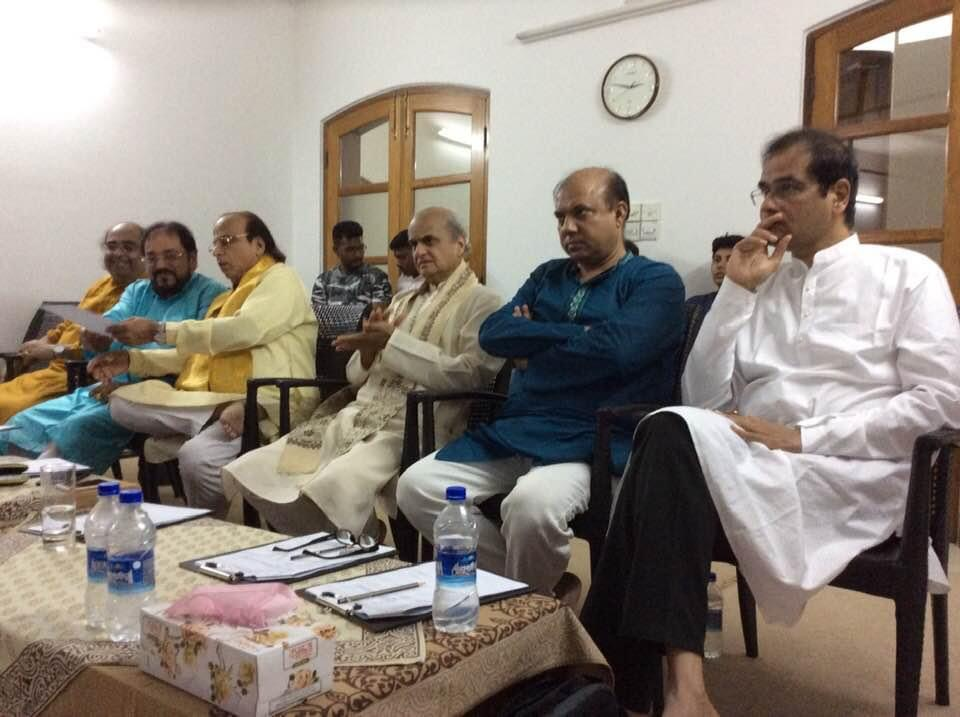
Sangeet Acharya with Pandit Ulhas Kashalkar, Pandit Uday Bhawalkar, Pandit Suresh Talwalkar, Pandit Kushal Das, Pandit Tejendra Narayan Majumder.

Ali's style was influenced by laya, chhanda, bolbaat, boltan, and layakari of Gwalior gharana. Most importantly, the style he follows as a classical artiste, his seven-year training from Pandit Narayan Patwardhan Rao of progressive Gwalior Gharana, and training from Kalpana Bhattacharya in Agra Gharana.

== Education ==
Ali earned a Bachelor of Performing Arts (Vocal Music) with distinctions in 1991 and a Masters of Performing Arts (Vocal Music) with distinctions in 1993 from the Maharaja Sayajirao University of Baroda. He obtained a Doctorate of Philosophy in 2016 from Gandharva Mahavidyalaya. His dissertation was "Diffusion and Diffraction of Raga in Bangladeshi Folk Music," supervised by Pt. Sudheer H. Pote. Ali is the first non-Indian to be conferred the title of Sangeet Acharya in vocal music from Akhil Bharatiya Gandharva Mahavidyalaya Mandal—the highest academic degree.

== Career ==
Assistant Professor of Classical Music (Vocal), Jagannath University, Bangladesh, 2016–present

Visiting Scholar and Guru, Department of Classical Music, Bangladesh Shilpakala Academy

Music directions at Bangladesh Shilpakala Academy

== Awards ==
- Gyanacharya Pt. Vishnudigambar Award, 2016

== Disciples ==
Ali has many disciples, among whom the noteworthy ones are Avipriyo Chakraborty, Afroja Roopa, Tahsinul Islam Aurko, Rimel Sarker

== Published books and articles ==
"রাগ সন্দর্শন," published by Jagannath University Publishing House

"দশ ঠাট-প্ৰেক্ষাপটে রাগ- বর্গীকরণে বর্তমান বাঁধা," Volume 11.1, January–June 2021, Jagannath University Journal of Arts.
