= Amit Kavthekar =

Indian tabla player

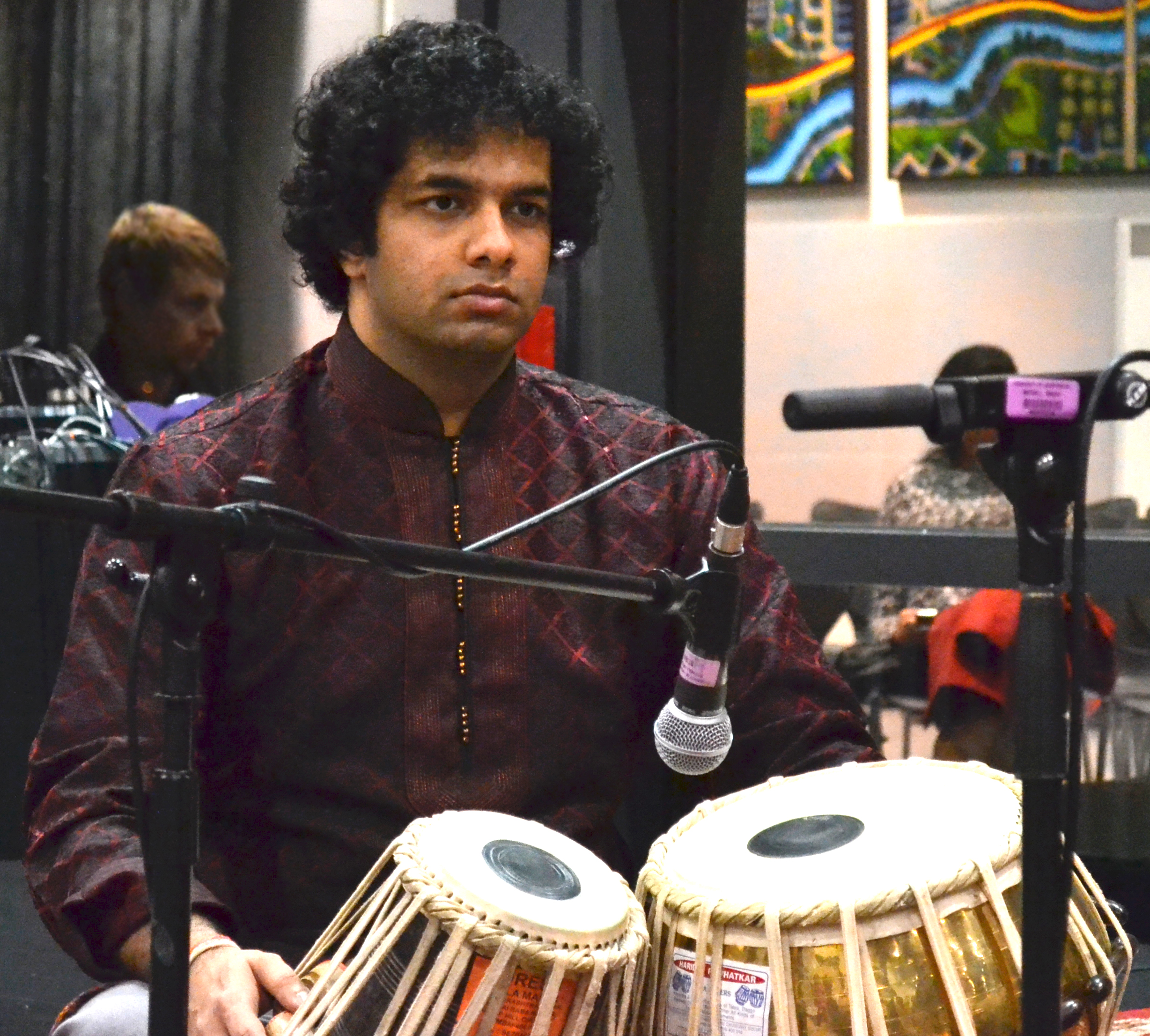
- Kavthekar in 2014

Background information
- Born: Amit Suhas Kavthekar; 11 August 1984 (age 42)
- Origin: Mumbai, Maharashtra, India
- Genres: Hindustani Classical Music, Jazz, Fusion, World Music, Classical Music
- Occupation: Musician
- Instrument: Tabla
- Years active: 2003–present
- Website: www.amitkavthekar.com

Amit Kavthekar (Marathi: अमित कवठेकर; born 11 August 1984) is an Indian tabla player known as the last ganda-bandhan (ordained disciple) of Alla Rakha and a prominent disciple of Zakir Hussain. Kavthekar is regarded as one of the leading young artists of Indian Classical music and tabla.

== Background ==
Kavthekar was born and raised in the Shivaji Park neighborhood of Mumbai to a Deshastha Brahmin family. His father is acclaimed rangoli artist Suhas Kavthekar. He attended Balmohan Vidyamandir in Dadar, and graduated from Ruparel College.

=== Musical training ===
Regarded as a child prodigy, Kavthekar (aged 6) was brought before Alla Rakha for consideration as a disciple. At age 11, he became a ganda-bandhan (ordained) disciple of Allarakha in a ceremony attended by Bhai Gaitonde, Suresh Talwalkar, Taufiq Qureshi, and Aditya Kalyanpur. After Alla Rakha's death in 2000, Kavthekar continued his training exclusively with Zakir Hussain, though he had been learning with him since age 7. He has also studied the nuances of tabla with Deepak Nerurkar and Sudhir Mainkar.

== Career ==
Kavthekar's performing career began in the early-2000s in Mumbai. He performed alongside Zakir Hussain and Sivamani for Zee TV on Indian television. He also appeared in Jabbar Patel's documentary about Shivkumar Sharma, accompanying the maestro in concert.

=== Performances ===
As an accompanist, Kavthekar has performed with prominent musicians like Ravi Chary, Ronu Majumdar, Shahid Parvez, Amjad Ali Khan, Pandit Jasraj, and Lata Mangeshkar.

He has also performed with Shahid Parvez at the Berklee College of Music, Aashish Khan at LearnQuest Academy of Music's Annual Conference at Regis College, Buddhadev Dasgupta, Kushal Das at the MIT's Wong Auditorium, Ashwini Bhide-Deshpande, and Ken Zuckerman, among others.

As an ensemble player, Kavthekar has played in jazz and fusion groups in the United States, Europe, Japan, and India. He has also played in Chicago's World Music Festival with Josh Feinberg and Kunal Gunjal.

Since 2019, he has performed in the ensemble quartet Purna Loka Ensemble with Purnaprajna Bangere, Jeff Harshbarger, and David Balakrishnan.

In 2018, he accompanied Amjad Ali Khan, Ayaan Ali Bangash, and Amaan Ali Bangash at the UN Day concert in New York City, before the General Assembly, in honor of Mahatma Gandhi's legacy.

Kavthekar performed in 2020 at the Dorchester's Ashmont Hill Chamber Music series, in a program that combined Western and Indian classical music, that was reviewed by The Boston Globe.

Beginning in 2021, Kavthekar began touring with guitarist Al Di Meola.

In 2022, Kavthekar performed at Carnegie Hall with Amjad Ali Khan, Amaan Ali Bangash, Ayaan Ali Bangash, and Ojas Adhiya.

In 2022, Kavthekar made his debut at the prestigious Sawai Gandharva Sangeet Mahotsav, accompanying Amjad Ali Khan with Anubrata Chatterjee.

In 2022, Kavthekar made his debut at the prestigious Harballabh Sangeet Sammelan, accompanying Anupama Bhagwat.

In 2024, he performed alongside Igor Iwanek of Boston University for his TEDx talk.

In 2024, he accompanied Anupama Bhagwat and Amaan Ali Bangash at Sawai Gandharva Bhimsen Mahotsav in Pune.

=== Teaching ===
Kavthekar has given musical lectures around the world and is currently a visiting professor at Salem State University. After settling in Boston, Kavthekar became leading faculty of the New England School of Music (NESOM) where he actively teaches tabla to dozens of students. He also teaches tabla at the American School of Bombay. Among his disciples includes the prodigy, Keshava.

== Artistry ==
Kavthekar's playing style is based on the Punjab baaj with influences from Delhi baaj and contemporary tabla players, particularly Zakir Hussain. His style is regarded as sensitive.

== Awards and recognition ==
Kavthekar was awarded the Taal–Mani by Sur Singar Samiti in Mumbai.

== Discography ==
| Album | Year | Musicians | Label |
|---|---|---|---|
| Rising Stars - Manas Kumar | 2011 | Manas Kumar | Sonic Octaves |
| The Young Masters of Tomorrow | 2011 | Sandeep Ranade | Surasik |
| Hamari Atariya Pe (Single) | 2019 | Aarti, Jiten Singh, Amitraj | Saregama |
| Metaraga | 2020 | Purna Loka Ensemble (featuring Purnaprajna Bangere on violin, David Balakrishnan on violin, Jeff Harshbarger on double bass, and Amit Kavthekar on tabla | Origin Records |
| Across the Universe | 2020 | Al Di Meola | earMusic |
| Strings for Peace | 2020 | Sharon Isbin on guitar, Amjad Ali Khan, Amaan Ali Bangash, and Ayaan Ali Bangash on sarod, and Amit Kavthekar on tabla | Zoho Music |
| Raga of the Radiant Moon | 2022 | Phil Scarff | Galloping Goat |
| By the Moon Raga Behag (Live) (Single) | 2024 | Sharon Isbin on guitar, Amaan Ali Bangash on sarod, Amit Kavthekar on tabla | Sharon Isbin Productions |
| Sangam | 2024 | S. Akash on bansuri, Manas Kumar on violin, Amit Kavthekar on tabla | No Limits Music Co. |
| Twentyfour | 2024 | Al Di Meola | earMusic |
