= Sandeep Ranade =

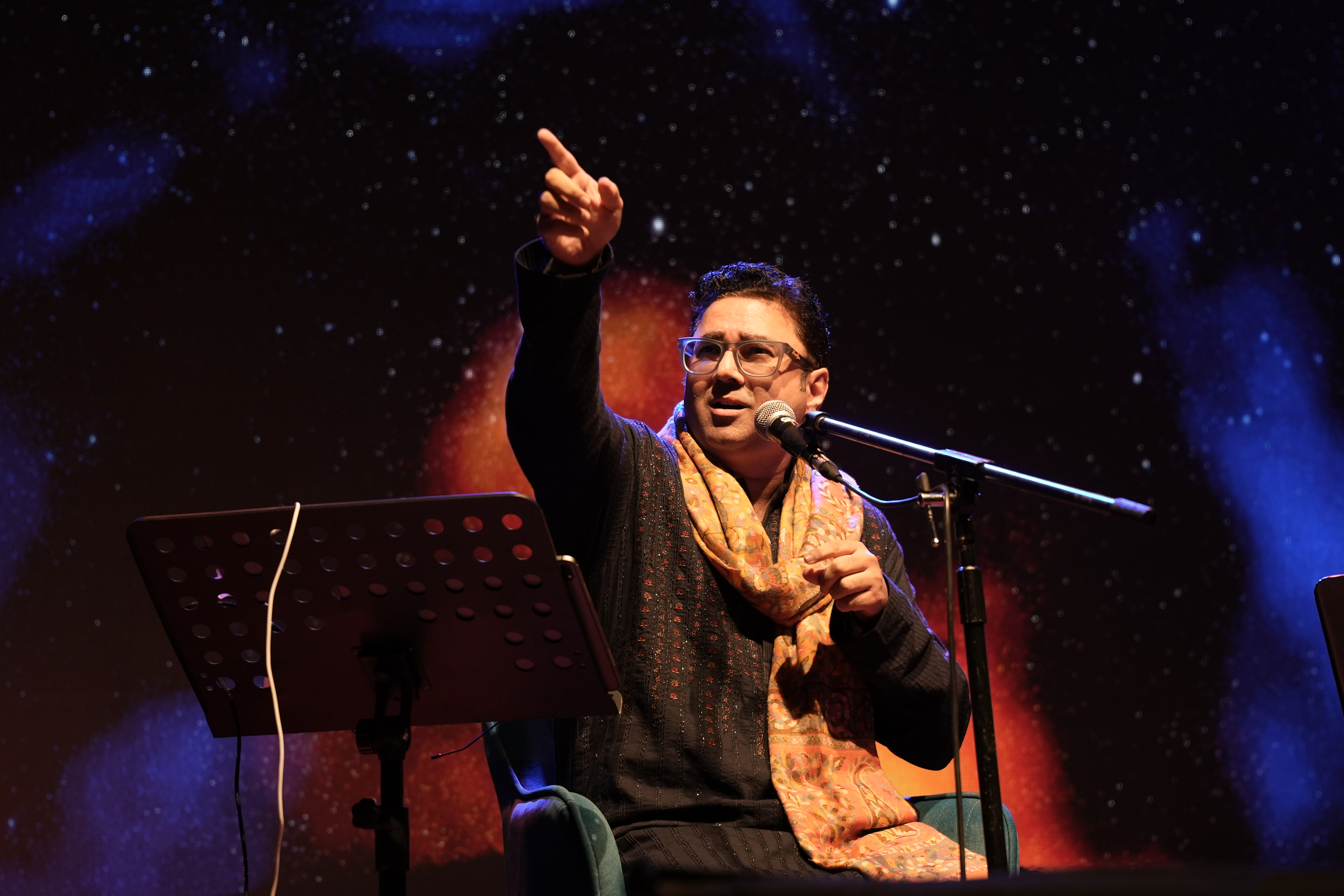
- Born: Sandeep Dilip Ranade; 8 July 1981; Bangalore, India
- Education: University of Pune; Johns Hopkins University
- Occupations: Musician; Software Engineer
- Years active: 2005 - Present
- Musical career
- Genres: Hindustani Classical khayal
- Instrument: Vocals

Sandeep Ranade (alias "Naadrang"; born 1981) is an Indian Classical singer and software engineer from Pune. His composition about coronavirus, "Na Corona Karo," was shared extensively on social media. In 2021, he won an Apple Design Award for his app, NaadSadhana.

== Career ==
Born in Bangalore, Ranade studied computer software and engineering at University of Pune and Johns Hopkins University, later working at Microsoft and Google. He later returned to Pune to focus on music, teach, and build a start-up.

He has given musical concerts in North America and India. As a supporting vocalist, he has accompanied Pandit Jasraj twice at the Sawai Gandharva Sangeet Mahotsav.

=== Praise from Apple ===
Ranade performed the song 'Mile Sur Mera Tumhara' along with the NaadSadhana App for Apple's CEO Tim Cook on 18 April 2024. Cook was moved by the performance and congratulated Ranade on the impact of the app throughout the world.

=== 148th Baba Harivallabh Sangeet Sammelan ===
Ranade performed at the prestigious 148th Baba Harivallabh Sangeet Sammelan, held on 29 December 2024. The event was marked by a sterling lineup of artists, including Nishat Khan (Sitar), Gundecha Brothers (Dhrupad), Meeta Pandit (Vocal), Kalapini Komkali (Vocal), Dr Santosh Nahar (Violin), Sucheta Ganguly (Vocal), Suchismita Chatterjee and Debopriya (Flute Jugalbandi), Pt. Nayan Ghosh and Ishaan Ghosh (Tabla Jugalbandi), Rahul Deshpande (Vocal), and Sandeep Ranade (Vocal), among others.

He commenced his performance with Raag Gorakh Kalyan, followed by his largely commended composition in Raag Basant, 'Na Corona Karo'. He enthralled the listeners with his representation of 'Mata Kalika', a composition in Raag Adana. He concluded the performance with a bhajan composed by Pandit Jasraj, 'Govind Damodar Madhaveti', followed by Raag Khamaj Bahar. Ranade received blessings from both the event coordinators and the spectators for his scintillating performance, symbolized by the act of showering flower petals upon him.

=== Coronavirus Song ===
On 18 March 2020, Ranade composed a song in Raag Basant, "Na Corona karo," about how to prevent transmitting the coronavirus just as Indian public health officials began implementing curfews which was circulated widely. Leading musicians commended the song.

=== Anand Mahindra's Recognition ===
Ranade's New Year composition "Anand barasao" (Bye Bye 2020) in Raag Des also went viral on social media in January 2021. Industrialist Anand Mahindra shared the performance on Twitter, writing that Ranade "left a U.S. based job for his music" and describing the NaadSadhana-accompanied rendition as "the best way to wish you all a great New Year."

=== Kiran Mazumdar-Shaw's Recognition ===
Biotech entrepreneur Kiran Mazumdar-Shaw also shared Ranade's work on social media, describing it as a "great jugalbandi of generational attitudes to risk taking," drawing a parallel between his classical training and his career as a software engineer.

== Musicianship ==
Ranade is a musician of the Mewati gharana and disciple of Pandit Jasraj. He also learned from Shobha Abhyankar and Anjali Joglekar-Ponkshe. Critics have celebrated the lustrous quality of Ranade's voice and musicality.

== NaadSadhana for iOS ==
Ranade has developed an iOS app for practicing riyaaz and developing shrutis, called "NaadSadhana". Utilizing AI, NaadSadhana utilizes iOS's low-latency capabilities for responsive feedback.

The app was featured on the Apple Developer Website, having gained significant traction to be called as a 'Music Maker'.

=== Apple Design Award ===
In 2021, NaadSadhana was awarded Apple Design Award in the "Innovation" category. As of 2021, it was one of only two apps developed by solo Indian developers to win this award and A.R. Rahman congratulated Ranade on the win.

=== NCPEDP- Mphasis Universal Design Award ===
Ranade won the 'National Centre for Promotion of Employment of disabled people' 2020 Universal Design Award in the category that recognizes people who work for the cause of accessibility and universal design in areas ranging from built environment, transport infrastructure, mobility & independent living aids, and assistive technology, to name a few. The app makes Indian classical music accessible to people with vision and hearing impairments. This is a first of its kind app that enables everyone, disabled and non-disabled, to train themselves in music.

== Discography ==
| Album | Year | Tracks | Featured Musicians |
|---|---|---|---|
| Untitled | 2005 | 1. Raag Madhuwanti; 2. Raag Kalawati; 3. Raag Miyan Malhar | Milind Kulkarni (harmonium); Rohit Mujumdar (tabla) |
| Untitled | 2008 | 1. Raag Malkauns; 2. Raag Charukeshi; 3. Raag Hemavati; 4. Bhavgeet based on Shanta Shelke's poem | Ramdas Palsule (tabla); Tanmay Deochake (harmonium) |
| Mana Tarana Gaaye | 2010 | 1. Raag Marwa; 2. Raag Chandrakauns; 3. Raag Miyan Malhar (Chatrang) | Tanmay Deochake (harmonium); Vibhav Khandolkar (tabla) |
| The Young Masters of Tomorrow | 2011 | 1. Raag Jog, "Ay piya ghar aave" (vilambit ektaal); 2. Raag Jog, "Kab tohe mein dekh paun" (madhyalaya teentaal); 3. Raag Jog, "Tum bin kaise kate" (druth teentaal); 4. Raag Jog, Tarana (druth teentaal); 5. Raag Bihag, "Dekho mori rang mein" (madhyalaya teentaal); 6. Raag Bihag, "Hya Bhavanatil Geet Purane" (natyageet in teentaal); 7. Raag Malkauns, "Piya more aawat nahin" (vilambit rupak); 8. Raag Malkauns, "Kaiso niko laagoma" (madhyalaya teentaal); 9. Raag Malkauns, "Aaj more ghar ayela balama" (druth teentaal); 10. Raag Ramdasi Malhar, "Sawan ke badra chhaye" (madhyalaya teentaal); 11. Raag Charukeshi, "He Surano Chandra Vha" (natyageet in rupak); 12. Raag Adana Kanada, "Mata Kalika" (Bhajan in teentaal) | Amit Kavthekar (tabla); Mohan Bhide (harmonium) |
| Elements by Naadrang | 2017 | 1. "Agni (Fire)" (ada chautaal) in Raag Gujri Todi; 2. "Jal (Water)" (teentaal) in Raag Miyan Malhar; 3. "Aakash (Space)" (bhajani) in Raag Malkauns; 4. "Pruthvi (Earth)" (chautaal) in Raag Saraswati; 5. "Vayu (Air)" (ektaal) in Raag Madhukauns; 6. "Kaliyug (Age of Vice)" (teentaal) in Raag Bhairavi | Synthetic accompaniment |
| Singles | 2020 | • "Na Corona Karo" in Raag Basant • "Bye Bye 2020 ('Anand barasao')" in Raag Des | NaadSadhana for iOS (synthetic accompaniment) |
| Singles | 2021 | • "Work from Home ('Dina raina saba jana karat')" in Raag Chandrakauns • "Mahashivaratri 2021 ('Bhava Bhairava Bhuteshwara')" in Raag Adana Kanada • "Na Corona Karo (One Year Later)" in Raag Basant • "Neendiya Chura Le Gaye Tore Naina" in Raag Bageshri | NaadSadhana for iOS (synthetic accompaniment) |
