= Durga Jasraj =

Indian original content producer (born 1966)

- Born: 12 September 1966 (age 60); Mumbai, Maharashtra, India

Durga Jasraj (born 12 September 1966) is an Indian original content producer, actor and Hindustani classical singer. She focuses on creating indigenous content in formats for multiple media, viz. Live, Television, Online, Mobile VAS, Radio, CD/DVDs. She founded "Art And Artistes (I) Pvt. Ltd.", an entertainment programming company in 1999. She subsequently co-founded the Indian Music Academy (IMA) in 2006.

== Early life ==
Jasraj was born in Mumbai to classical vocalist Pandit Jasraj and Madhura Pandit. She has an older brother, music director Shaarang Dev. Her maternal grandfather was Bollywood director V. Shantaram and her maternal cousin was former actor Siddharth Ray.

== Career ==
Jasraj started her career as a classical vocalist at age seven. Her acting debut came in Ketan Anand's Aaja Meri Jaan (1993). She acted in TV series including Chandrakanta (1994) and Mahabharat (1988). In the Mahabharat she acted as Ulupi. She performed as a Hindustani classical singer and with her father for many years.

She became popular on Zee TV's show, Antakshari as a co-host with Annu Kapoor during the 1990s.

She quit the show to start her company Art And Artistes (I) Pvt Ltd.

=== Indian Music Academy ===
She co-founded Indian Music Academy (IMA) in 2006, with her father as a chief patron. The organization promotes various forms of Indian music. It was formally inaugurated on 18 February 2006, by then-President A P J Abdul Kalam at Mumbai’s National Centre for the Performing Arts.

IMA helps old and ailing musicians to get urgent medical attention. It holds annual IMA Awards. In 2007, the awards were given away by President A.P.J. Abdul Kalam. Recipients included Carnatic musician Balamuralikrishna, playback singer Asha Bhonsle, Music composer Ilayaraja, Hindustani classical singer and Music composer Ramesh Narayan, Hindustani classical singer Girija Devi, sarod maestro Ali Akbar Khan.

Idea Jalsa Live Concerts have travelled to more than 50 cities across India and in the latest series beginning in January 2013, reached out to 7 crore (70 million).

Durga directed "Tiranga" a production that traveled across the world.

She served one term as a board member of the Censor Board of India.

== Personal life ==
Durga Jasraj married at age 18 and was divorced at 21. She has a daughter.
