= V. R. Athavale =

Indian classical singer

- Also known as: V. R. Athavale, Vi. Ra. Athavale, Naad Piya.
- Born: Vinayak Ramchandra Athavale; 20 December 1918; Bhor Maharashtra
- Origin: Vile Parle, Mumbai, Maharashtra, India
- Died: 11 August 2011 (aged 92) Vile Parle, Mumbai
- Genre: Hindustani classical music
- Occupations: Hindustani classical vocalist, Musicologist
- Years active: 1940–2011

Vinayak Ramchandra Athavale (marathi: विनायक रामचंद्र आठवले) (1918 - 2011), better known as V. R. Athavale or Vi. Ra. Athavale, was a Hindustani classical vocalist and one of the foremost Hindustani classical musicologists of the 20th Century, alongside Vamanrao Deshpande and Sharadchandra Arolkar. He composed using the pen name "Naad Piya". He is known for his critique of traditional ideas and modern aesthetics. He was trained primarily by Vinayakrao Patwardhan and Vilayat Hussain Khan and is considered a representative of Gwalior and Agra traditions.

== Early life and background ==
Athavale's father, R. B. Athavale, was a leading professor of Sanskrit. He grew up in an environment of scholarship with a love for art, literature, and culture. He developed a background in Sanskrit literature and ancient Indian culture.

Graduating in 1939 with a degree in chemistry and physics, Athavale began learning music at the age of 21. He became involved in the freedom movement of 1942 and went underground for some time. Athavale was deeply influenced by political thinkers like Sane, Bhagwat, and Gandhi and Vinayak Damodar Savarkar. He also worked in All India Radio of Jaipur, Delhi and Baroda as a Producer.

== Musical training ==
He became Vinayakrao Patwardhan's disciple and later, with permission, learned from Vilayat Hussain Khan. Figures like Gajananrao Joshi, Nivruttibuwa Sarnaik, and D. V. Paluskar were "guiding lights" to Athavale throughout his association with them. He also studied with Ramkrishnabuwa Vaze.

== Career and research ==
Athavale studied aesthetics, bandish, gharana, history, thumri, naad, philosophy, and bhaav during his career. He wrote in Gujarati, Marathi, and Hindi primarily. Criticizing the subjectivity of aesthetics, he argued against musical ideology and advocated for natural expression. Post independence, while he was working As a music producer in AIR Delhi, he was asked to compose “Vande Mataram” again. He then composed it in Raga Desh and the same had been broadcast on January 26, 1950 all over India. Later, the same composition in Raga Desh has been widely accepted. When he was asked being not getting any credit for this, he humbly said “ It was a part of my job”.

=== Aesthetics ===
Athavale advocated for natural voice production and cultivating a sense of beauty. Speaking on the "sahitya of singing," he said:

"Indulging in very fast singing or playing is always appealing to primitive human instincts... However, such excesses, specially in vocal music, are really exercises in futility."

— V. R. Athavale

=== Gharanas ===
Athavale questioned the legitimacy of gharanas and argued that their salient features were defined by alap, bol, and taan, not merely swara and laya.

=== Classicism ===
Athavale believed classicism and romanticism (as opposed to imitation) were codependent and necessary for the preservation and enrichment of Hindustani classical music.

=== Institutions ===
Athavale worked as a producer for All India Radio for many years. He was a trustee of Akhil Bharatiya Gandharva Mahavidyalaya in Miraj. served as the Director of the In the 1980s, he served as the Director of the Hindustani faculty at Goa Kala Akademi in Panjim. He was also head of the music department at SNDT Women's University. He founded the Akhil Bharatiya Mahavidyalaya in Vashi.

== Disciples ==
Several of Athavale's disciples went on to become major performers and scholars. These include Shobha Abhyankar, Shanno Khurana, Sudhir Pote, Ali Razwan, Nisha Nigalye-Parasnis, Sandhya Kathavate, and Bireshvar Gautam.

== Publications ==
- "Vishnu Digambar Paluskar"
- "Raag Vaibhav"
- "Naad Piya"
- "Naad Chintan"
- "Naad Vaibhav"

== Discography ==
- 1988 - "Compositions In Rare Ragas" (Sushree Records). Raags Gandhari Todi, Jogia Asavari, Sindhura Asavari, Sarpada Bilawal, Kakubh Bilawal, Jait, Jait Kalyan, Gauri (Bhairav Ang), Lalita Gauri (Bhairav Ang), Dhaani, Rageshri Bahar. Featuring Milind Raimani (tabla).
