= Maniram =

Indian classical vocalist

Pandit Maniram

Background information
- Born: 8 December 1910
- Origin: Pili Mandori, Fatehabad District, Haryana, India
- Died: 16 May 1985 (aged 74)
- Genres: Khayal, Bhajan, Thumri
- Occupation: Vocalist
- Years active: 1935–1985

Shri Maniram Pandit (8 December 1910 – 16 May 1985) was an Indian classical vocalist from the Mewati gharana. Pandit is known for his exemplary contribution to Indian classical music. His compositions ‘ Mata Kalika ’, Niranjani Narayani, Gala Bhujang, Lasat Seer Chand are master pieces and sung by each and every vocalist of Mewati Gharana . He is the elder brother and guru of Pt. Jasraj and eldest son of Pt. Motiram Pandit.

== Background ==
Pandit was born at Pilli Mandori in Haryana to an orthodox Brahmin family with strong musical traditions in the Mewati gharana. His father, Pt. Motiram Pandit, died prematurely in 1939, hours before being announced as Osman Ali Khan's new court musician. After his father died, Maniram Pandit became the patriarch of his family and moved them to Hyderabad where he became a court musician and left deep musical roots.

He began performing professionally at this point in order to support his family. While Maniram's career grew, he began teaching his younger brother, Pratap Narayan, and tabla to his youngest brother, Jasraj.

In 1948, Pandit moved to Calcutta where he lived for two decades. In 1963, Pandit moved with his family to Mumbai. There, Pandit met political resistance from other musicians, .

== Music ==
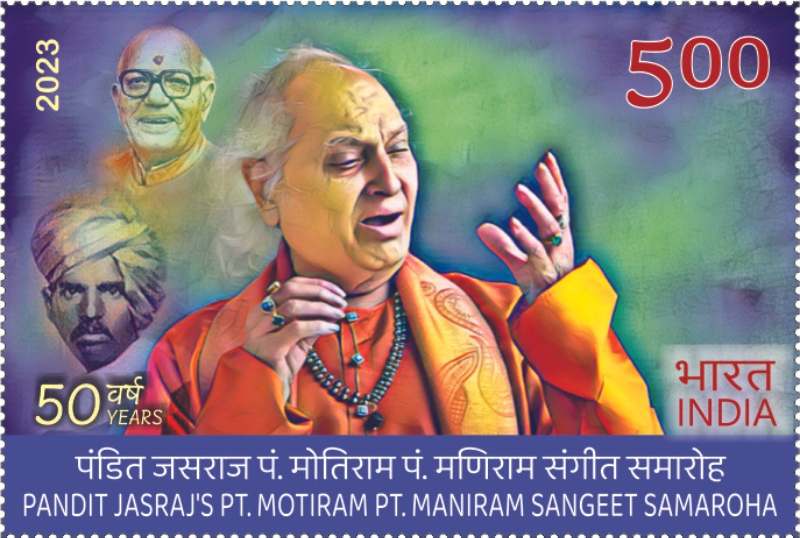
A 2023 stamp of India featuring Maniram (top) and his brothers, Pratap Narayan and Jasraj (center)

Pandit began training with his father, Motiram Pandit, and uncle, Jyotiram Pandit, at age three until the age of 14. He was regarded for his vocal range and gamaks.

=== Hyderabad Years (c. 1934–1944) ===
Pandit's family relocated to Hyderabad as his father was invited to join the Hyderabad Court as a musician.

=== Sanand Years (1944–1948) ===
Around 1944, Pandit lost his voice and moved his family to Sanand under the patronage of Jaiwant Singhji Waghela, the maharaj of Sanand, himself a student of the Mewati gharana. There he became the court musician of Sanand.

Pandit spent his time in Sanand focusing on recovery, teaching his brother, Jasraj, and collaborating with Waghela on musical compositions. After regaining his voice during prayer at Sanand, Pandit acquired a renewed sense of spirituality and became a devotee of Durga. Since, emphasis of religious themes became central to Pandit's music, as evident in his compositions.

=== Performance ===
Jasraj frequently performed with Maniram from the 1950s onwards. Musicologist Deepak Raja notes that their duets were "rich in melodic content and depth of raga exploration" and "a model of perfect understanding and collaborative effort."

=== Disciples ===
Among Pandit's disciples included Pratap Narayan, Jasraj, Bansilal Kapoor, and Girish Wazalwar.

== Personal life ==
Children- Smt Yogai Askaran Sharma, Pandit Vinod, Pandit Dinesh, Smt Sudarshana Pandit Chakraborty. Pandit had four children, two sons and two daughters. His eldest daughter Smt Yogai Sharma is married to Dr Pandit Askaran Sharma a vocalist par excellence. Pandit Maniram's grandson Anand Sharma who is Yogai and Askaran Sharma's son is a Singer and music director in films and television. He is pioneer of reality music talent shows and has done various shows like Saregamapa, Indian Idol, Voice of India etc. His eldest son, Vinod (1952-2001), was a singer who married actress Deepti Naval before dying of cancer. The youngest, Dinesh Pandit is a percussionist, music producer, arranger, and composer based in London.

== Discography ==
Album	Year	Label	Tracks	Featured Musicians
Three Illustrious Brothers	1976	His Master's Voice	1. Raag Jog - "Piya Ghar Na" (vilambit ektaal), "Meri Gail Nahi Chhode" (druth teentaal); 2. Raag Dhanashri - "Ansua Amol Kanth Birmaye" (vilambit ektaal), "Sakhi Mohe Beet Mata" (druth teentaal)	Pandit Maniram; Pandit Pratap Narayan; Pandit Jasraj; Accompanists: Ustad Nizamuddin Khan (tabla); Ustad Sultan Khan (sarangi); Appasaheb Jalgaonkar (harmonium)

== Awards and recognition ==
- 2018 - The Mayor of Mumbai unveiled "Sangeet Mahamahopadhyay Pandit Maniram Marg," a street in Versova, in memory of Pandit. In attendance were Pandit Jasraj, Hridayanath Mangeshkar, Pandit Dinesh, and Jatin–Lalit.
