= Jasraj =

Indian classical singer (1930–2020)

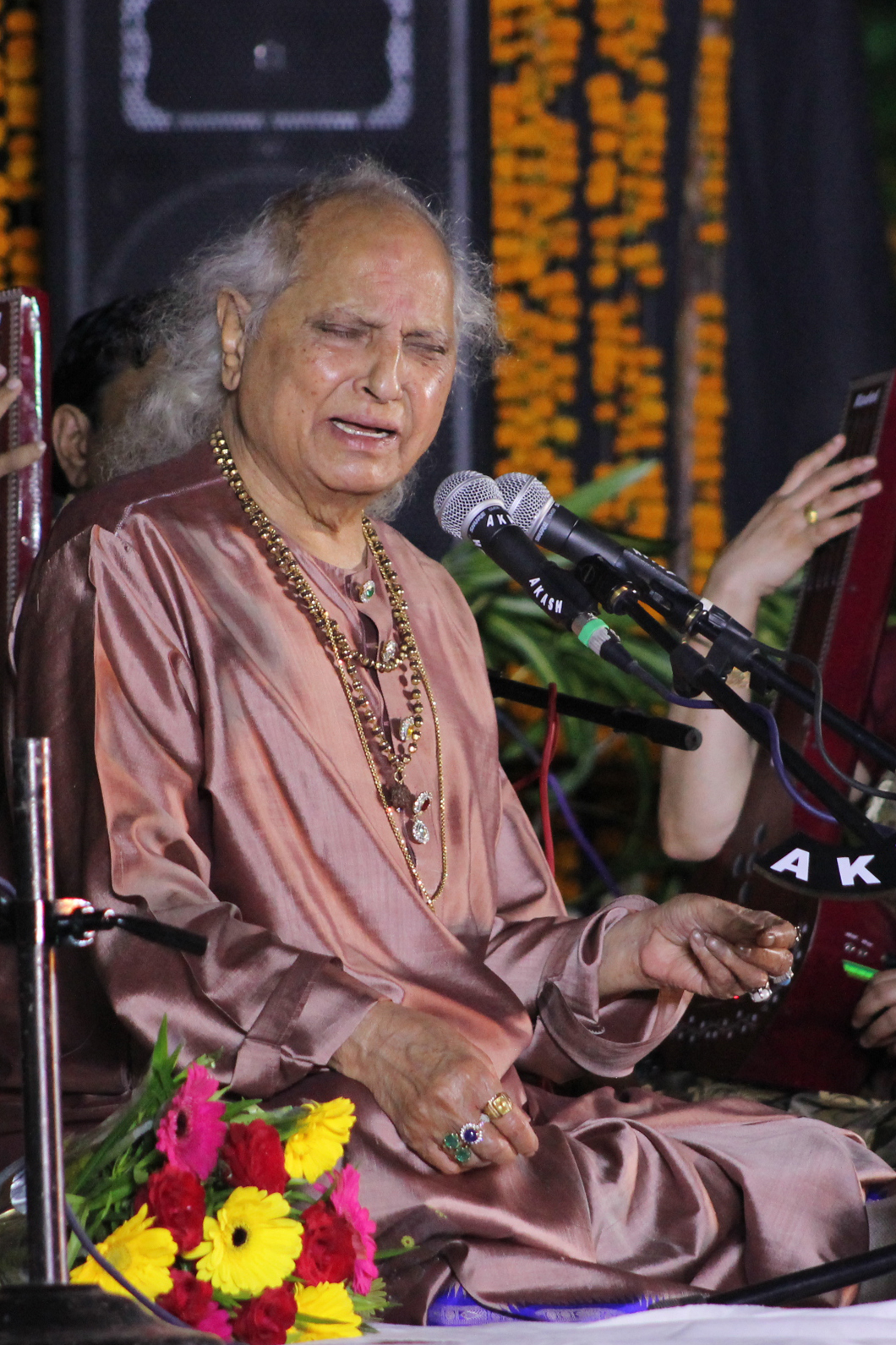
- Pandit Jasraj Performing at Indira Gandhi Rashtriya Manav Sangrahalaya, Bhopal in Poonam-35 Program (2015)
- Born: 28 January 1930; Hisar, Punjab, British India (now Fatehabad, Haryana, India)
- Died: 17 August 2020 (aged 90); New Jersey, U.S.
- Occupations: Singer; music teacher; tabla player
- Spouse: Madhura Shantaram (m. 1962)
- Children: Shaarang Dev Pandit; Durga Jasraj
- Relatives: Pandit Maniram (brother) Vasant Kumar Pandit (Cousin)
- Awards: See awards and honours
- Musical career
- Genre: Hindustani classical music
- Instruments: Vocals; tabla
- Years active: 1945–2020
- Website: pjim.org

Pandit Jasraj (28 January 1930 – 17 August 2020) was an Indian classical vocalist, belonging to the Mewati gharana (musical apprenticeship lineage). His musical career spanned 75 years resulting in national and international fame, respect and numerous major awards and accolades. His legacy includes memorable performances of classical and semi-classical vocal music, classical and devotional music, albums and film soundtracks, innovations in various genres including Haveli Sangeet and popularizing the Mewati Gharana – a school of thought in Hindustani classical music. Pandit Jasraj taught music to amateur and professional students in India, Europe, Canada and the United States.

== Early life ==
Pandit Jasraj was born on 28 January 1930 in Pili Mandori, a village in the then Hisar district (now in Fatehabad district) of Haryana, (Note: Pili Mandori is now within the Fatehabad district.) in an artistic Brahmin family to Pandit Motiram, a classical singer and Krishna Bai. He was the youngest of three sons, in a family of classical singers. Motiram died in 1934 when Jasraj was four, on the day he was to be appointed as the state musician in the court of Mir Osman Ali Khan, the Nizam (ruler) of Hyderabad State. His eldest brother was vocalist Pandit Maniram, who instructed Jasraj after the death of their father. Jasraj's elder brother, Pandit Pratap Narayan, was also an accomplished musician and was the father of music composer duo Jatin–Lalit, singer-actress Sulakshana Pandit and actress Vijeta Pandit. Pandit Pratap Narayan taught Jasraj to play tabla starting at age 7, but Jasraj decided that he wanted to only sing by 14.

Jasraj spent his youth in Hyderabad, and travelled often to Sanand in Gujarat to study music with musicians of the Mewati gharana. Jasraj performed for Thakur Jaiwant Singhji Vaghela, the Thakur Sahib of Sanand, who was deeply dedicated to classical music, and received training from him.

In 1946, Jasraj moved to Calcutta, where he began singing classical music for radio.

== Personal life ==
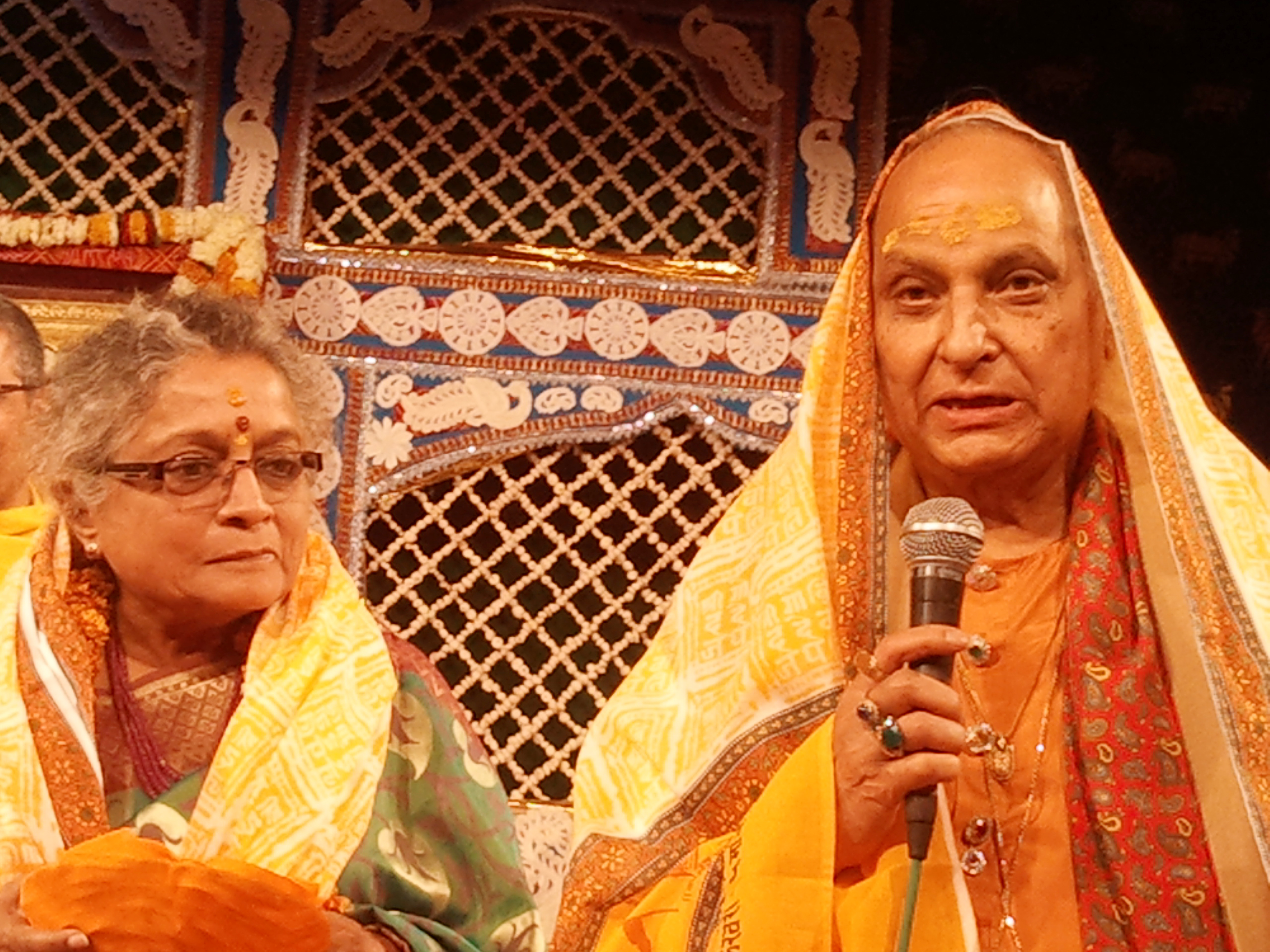
Jasraj with his wife Madhura on the stage of Satsang Bhawan in Govind Dev Ji Temple, Jaipur (2011).

In 1962, Jasraj married Madhura Shantaram, the daughter of film director V. Shantaram, whom he had first met in 1960 in Bombay. They initially lived in Calcutta, moving to Bombay in 1963. They had two children, a son, Shaarang Dev Pandit, a daughter, Durga Jasraj, and four grandchildren.

Madhura made a film, Sangeet Martand Pandit Jasraj in 2009 and directed her first Marathi film, Aai Tuza Ashirwad, in 2010, in which Jasraj and Lata Mangeshkar sang in Marathi.

== Career ==
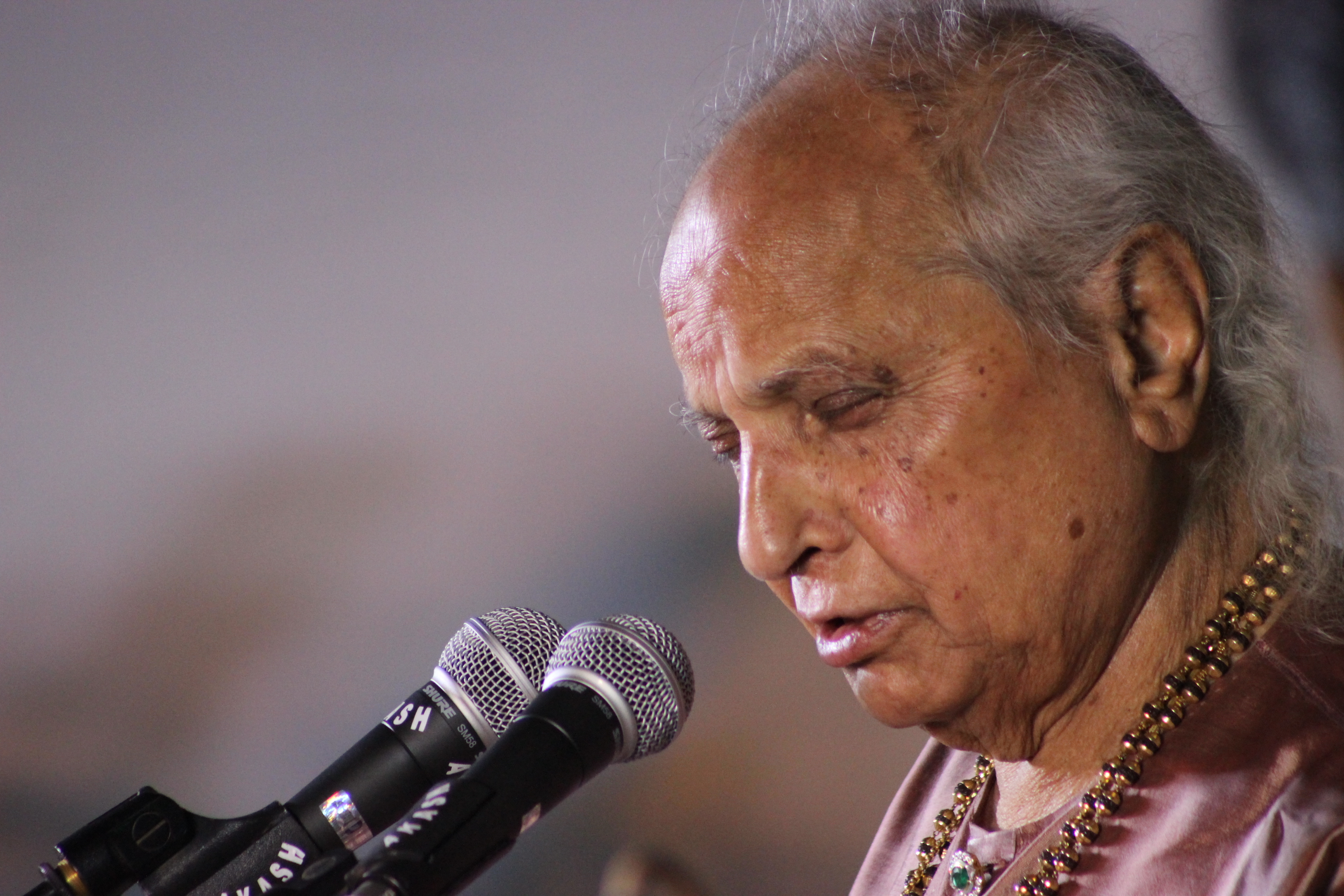
Jasraj at the Indira Gandhi Rashtriya Manav Sangrahalaya Poonam-35, Bhopal, in 2015

=== Training ===
Jasraj was initiated into vocal music by his father, and later trained as a tabla accompanist under his elder brother, Pandit Pratap Narayan. He would frequently accompany Maniram in his solo vocal performances. He credits the vocalist, Begum Akhtar, as inspiring him to take up classical music.

Jasraj began training as a vocalist at the age of 14, after renouncing tabla in reaction to how accompanists were treated at the time . He would practice singing close to 14 hours a day. In 1952 when he was 22 he performed his first stage concert as a vocalist in the court of King Tribhuvan Bir Bikram Shah of Nepal in Kathmandu. Before becoming a stage performer, Jasraj worked as a performing artist on radio for several years.

He initially trained as a classical vocalist with Pandit Maniram, and later with Jaiwant Singh Waghela, a vocalist and beenkar.

=== Technique and style ===
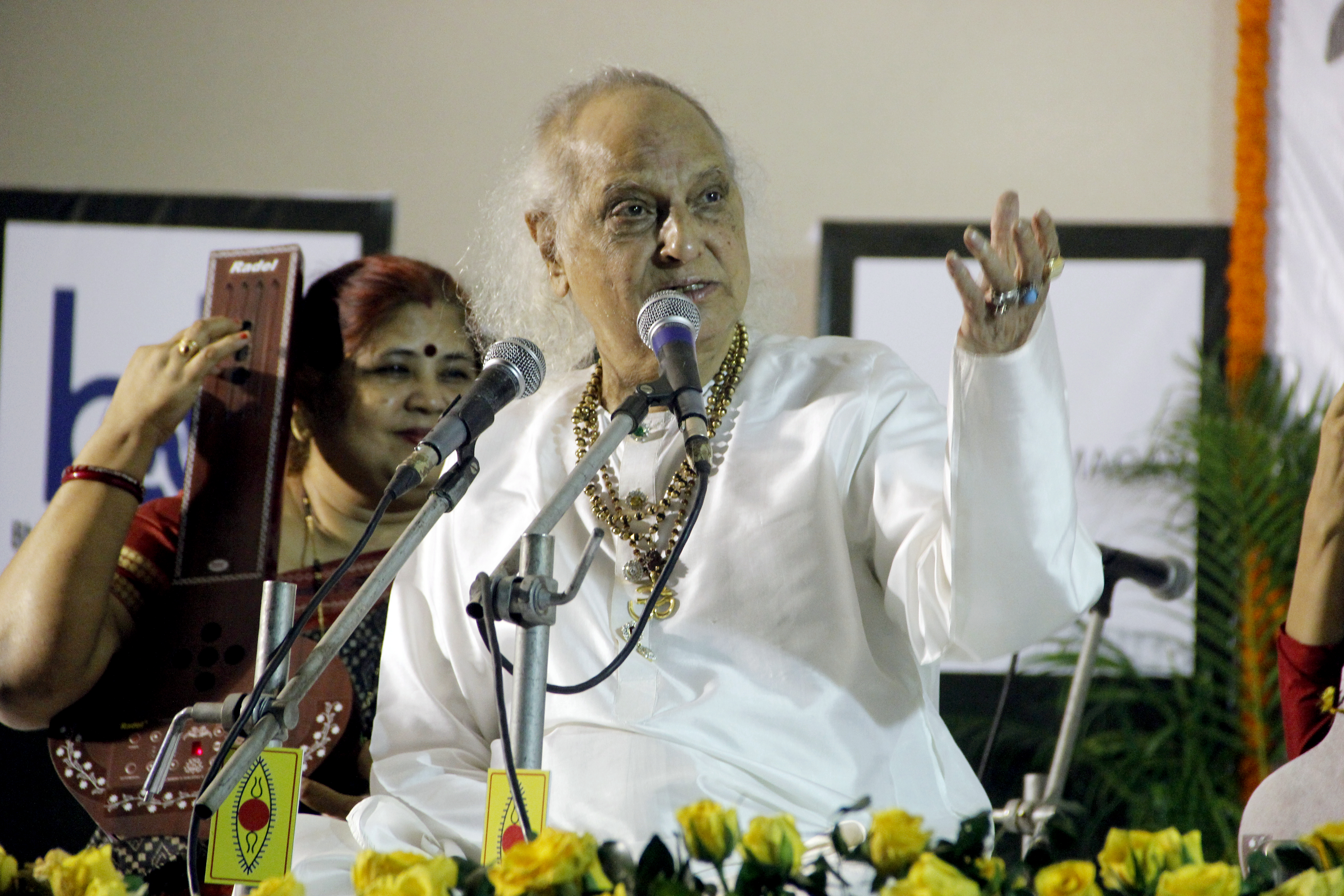
Jasraj in a concert at Bhubaneswar

==== Classical music ====
Although Jasraj belonged to the Mewati gharana, a school of music known for its traditional performances of khayals, Jasraj had sung khayals with some flexibility, adding elements of lighter styles, including the thumri. During the initial stages of his career, he was criticised for incorporating elements from other schools of music, or gharanas, into his singing. Musicologist S. Kalidas has noted, however, that this borrowing of elements across gharanas has now become more commonly accepted.

Jasraj created a novel form of jugalbandi called Jasrangi that is styled on the ancient system of moorchhana, between a male and a female vocalist, who each sing different ragas at the same time. He was also known for presenting a variety of rare ragas including Abiri Todi and Patdeepaki.

==== Semi-classical and popular music ====
In addition to performing classical music, Jasraj had worked to popularise innovations in semi-classical musical styles, such as Haveli Sangeet, which involves semi-classical performances in temples. He had also sung classical and semi-classical compositions for film soundtracks, such as the song, 'Vandana Karo', composed in the raga Ahir Bhairav by the composer Vasant Desai, for the film Ladki Sahyadri Ki (1966), a duet with vocalist Bhimsen Joshi for the soundtrack of the film Birbal My Brother (1975), and a ballad, Vaada Tumse Hai Vaada for a horror film titled 1920 (2008) directed by Vikram Bhatt.

In memory of his father, Jasraj organised an annual musical festival called the Pandit Motiram Pandit Maniram Sangeet Samaroh in Hyderabad. The festival has been held annually since 1972.

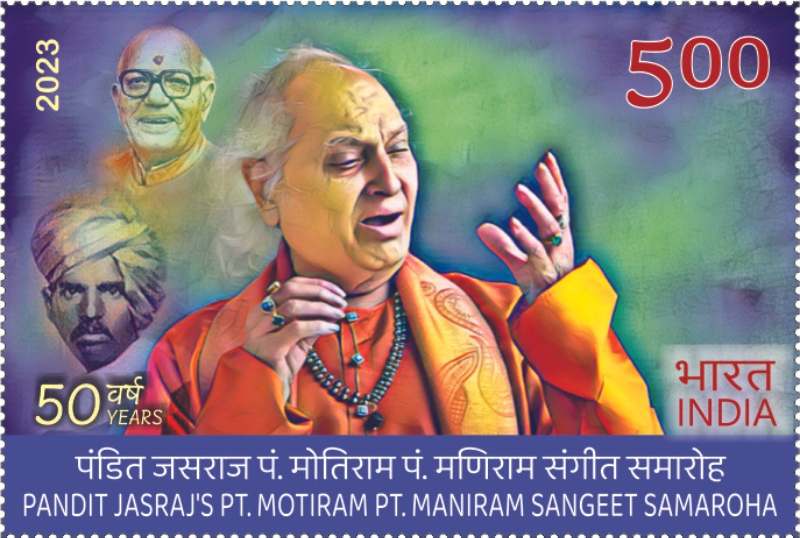
A 2023 stamp of India featuring Jasraj (center)

On 28 January 2017, the production house Navrasa Duende celebrated Jasraj's 87th birthday and 80 years of his service to music with a classical music concert titled My Journey, an Intimate Evening with Pandit Jasraj at Jawaharlal Nehru Stadium, New Delhi. He received a standing ovation.

==== Teaching ====
Jasraj tutored several students who have gone on to perform as classical musicians, including Saptarshi Chakraborty, Sanjeev Abhyankar, violinist Kala Ramnath, Sandeep Ranade, shehnai player Lokesh Anand, Tripti Mukherjee, Suman Ghosh, flautist Shashank Subramanyam, Anuradha Paudwal, Sadhana Sargam, and Ramesh Narayan.

He was also the founder of schools for Indian classical music in Atlanta, Tampa, Vancouver, Toronto, New York, New Jersey, Pittsburgh, Mumbai, and Kerala. Jasraj would spend six months of each year in the United States and Canada at either his home in New Jersey, teaching, or touring. At age 90, he was teaching some of his international students through Skype.

== Death ==
Pandit Jasraj remained in the US when the country entered its COVID-19 lockdown. He died at his home in New Jersey on 17 August 2020 at 5:15 am EST, due to cardiac arrest. His body was later repatriated on an Air India flight to Mumbai where it was cremated with state honours and 21-gun salute at Pawan Hans Crematorium in Vile Parle. The Prime Minister of India, Narendra Modi said that his death "leaves a deep void in the Indian cultural sphere. Not only were his renditions outstanding, he also made a mark as an exceptional mentor to several other vocalists."

On 27 December 2023, Government of India released a commemorative postage stamp to mark 50 years of Jasraj's music festival.

== Awards and honours ==
- Padma Shri (1975)
- Sangeet Natak Akademi Award (1987)
- Padma Bhushan (1990)
- Padma Vibhushan (2000)
- Swathi Sangeetha Puraskaram (2008)
- Sangeet Natak Akademi Fellowship (2010)
- Pu La Deshpande lifetime achievement award (2012)
- Bharat Ratna Bhimsen Joshi Classical Music Life Achievement Award (2013)
- Sumitra Charat Ram Award for Lifetime Achievement (2014)
- Marwar Sangeet Ratna Award (2014)
- Gangubai Hangal Lifetime Achievement Award (2016)
- Asteroid 300128 Panditjasraj, discovered by astronomers with the Mount Lemmon Survey in 2006, was named in his honour. The official naming citation was published by the Minor Planet Center on 27 August 2019 (M.P.C. 115895).
- Sangeet Kala Ratna
- Master Dinanath Mangeshkar Award
- Maharashtra Gaurav Puraskar

== Discography ==
- Raga Symphony (2009) (Note: Romero, Angel (18 August 2018). "Artist Profiles: Pandit Jasraj". World Music Central.)
- Anuraag (2000)
- Devotionally Yours
- The Glory of Dawn – Morning Raagas (2005)
- Invocation (1993)
- Kanha
- Khazana (2008)
- In Concert Vancouver Vols. 1 & 2 (1997)
- Malhar – A Downpour of Music (2005)
- The Meditative Music of Pandit Jasraj
- Parampara – The Mewati Tradition
- Pride of India (2002)
- Multaani & Din-ki-Purya
- Shri Krishna Anuraag (2000) (Note: Shri Krishna Anuraag, Adhishri Tradings : Sony Music, 2000, OCLC 704701864)
- Songs of Krishna Vol. 1 & Vol. 2 (2000)
- The Spiritual Journey (2005)
- Baiju Bawra Vols. 1 & 2 (2008)
- Devi Upasana (2007)
- Miyan Tansen Vol 1 & Vol 2 (2006)
- Tapasya Vol. 1 (2005)
- Darbar (2003)
- Maheshwara Mantra (2002)
- Soul Food (2005)
- Haveli Sangeet (2001)
- Inspiration (2000)
- Ragas Triveni and Multani Live
- Ragas Bihagda and Gaud Giri Malhar
- Worship By Music/Live Stuggart '88
- Ornamental Voice

=== Performances in film soundtracks ===
- "Vandana Karo" in Ladki Sahyadri Ki (1966, music by Vasant Desai, based on Ahir Bhairav)
- Jugalbandi with Bhimsen Joshi in Birbal My Brother (1973, music by Shyam Prabhakar, based on Malkauns)
- "Neend Na Aaye" in Ek Hasina Thi (2004, music by Amar Mohile)
- "Vaada Tumse Hai Vaada" in 1920 (2008, music by Adnan Sami)
- A song in Life of Pi (2012, music by Mychael Danna, based on Ahir Bhairav)
