= Alcheringa (festival) =

Annual festival at Indian Institute of Technology

Alcheringa, IIT Guwahati
- Alcheringa
- Genre: Cultural festival
- Venue: Indian Institute of Technology, Guwahati
- Locations: Guwahati, India
- Inaugurated: 1996
- Attendance: More than 110,000 (in 2020)
- Organiser: Student-Run, Non-Profit Organisation
- Website: http://www.alcheringa.in

Alcheringa, also known as "Alcher", is the annual cultural festival of Indian Institute of Technology (IIT), Guwahati. The festival was started in 1996 by a group of students of IIT Guwahati. Spread over 3 days and 4 nights, Alcheringa is conducted towards the end of January every year. The 27th edition of Alcheringa was held from 2 February 2023 to 5 February 2023, witnessing 80+ events.

The festival features one of India's biggest rock band competitions, Rock-o-Phonix.

== History ==
Alcheringa derives its etymology from Australian aboriginal mythology and translates to "The Eternal Dreamtime."

In 2002, ‘Alcheringa: Yin and Yang’ the concept of four pro-nites was first introduced. ‘Alcheringa: Navras’ in 2006, hosted the festival's first international act. In 2011, Alcheringa's social initiative ‘Udaan - Giving flights to hope’ was started.

The latest edition of Alcheringa was held with limited participation and events pertaining to the ongoing COVID-19 crisis.

=== Themes and acts by year ===
Year	Theme	Headlining Performances
2000		Sandeep Vyas - DJ Sanjeev Vyas.
2001		Euphoria - Pandit Raajan Mishra - Pandit Saajan Mishra.
2002		Parikrama - Sandeep Vyas - DJ Sanjeev Vyas - Pandit Hari Prasad Chaurasia - Pandit Vishwa Mohan Bhat - Padamshree Teejan Bai.
2006		Strings.
2007		Remo Fernandes.
2008	Revel in Retro	Crescendo: Shaan, Juggernaut: Pin Drop Violence. Raghu Dixit Project
2009	Around The World In 3 Days	Crescendo: Sonu Nigam
2010	Xtreme	Crescendo: Shankar–Ehsaan–Loy, Juggernaut: Eluveitie
2011	Lights.Camera.Action	Blitzkrieg: RDB, Crescendo: KK, Saaz: Advaita
2012	Urban Odyssey	Saaz had Anoushka Shankar, Crescendo had Javed Ali and Juggernaut had the Israeli death metal band Orphaned Land.
2013	Parallel Paradise	Mohit Chauhan performed at Crescendo Blitzkrieg had Sunburn Live and Juggernaut had Irish rock band Frantic Jack.
2014	Atlantis	Juggernaut had Michael Angelo Batio, Saaz had the Mexican Villalobos brothers, Crescendo had Shilpa Rao and Blitzkrieg had Undying Inc on the Redbull Tour Bus.
2015	Magnum Opus	Crescendo: Lucky Ali, Juggernaut: Ne Obliviscaris, Saaz: Ustaad Shujaat Khan
2016	Gamescape	Crescendo had Mika Singh and Juggernaut had the Finnish folk metal band Korpikilaani. Saaz had Amaan and Ayaan Ali Khan along with The Indian Jam Project.
2017	Eternal Sands	Crescendo had Sajid–Wajid, Blitzkrieg saw performances by Javed Ali and Canadian metal band All Else Fails. Juggernaut had EDM performances by Carl Nunes and Marnik. Saaz had performances by Grammy Award winner Vikku Vinayakram.
2018	Echoes of Innocence	Vishal–Shekhar, Diego Miranda, Mashd N Kutcher, The F16's, Ganesh and Kumaresh, Shahid Parvez.
2019	The Ethereal Conquest	Sachin–Jigar, Mariana Bo, Danny Avila, The Order of Chaos, Vishwa Mohan Bhatt, Ustad Akram Khan, Ajay Prasanna.
2020	Gala de Janeiro	Saaz: Mandolin U Rajesh, Mohini Dey, Ghatam Giridhar Udupa, Mukul Dongre, Hafeez Ahmed Alvi, Nandini Shankar. Juggernaut: Pre-Headliners Kaam Bhari, Spitfire, Headliner Ritviz. Crescendo: Jubin Nautiyal. Blitzkrieg: Pre-Headliner DJ Ola Ras, Headliner DJ Shaan.
2021	Realm of Euphoria	
2022	Voyage to Neoterra	Crescendo: Amaal Malik, Juggernaut: Underground Authority(EPR)
2023	Pledge to Persist	Crescendo: Vishal-Sheykhar, Juggernaut: The Yellow Diary, Blitzkrieg: Aerreo, Saaz: Sangeeta Shankar Ji, along with her daughters Ragini and Nandnini, Mahesh Raghvan
2024	Chromatic Elysium	Crescendo: Armaan malik,

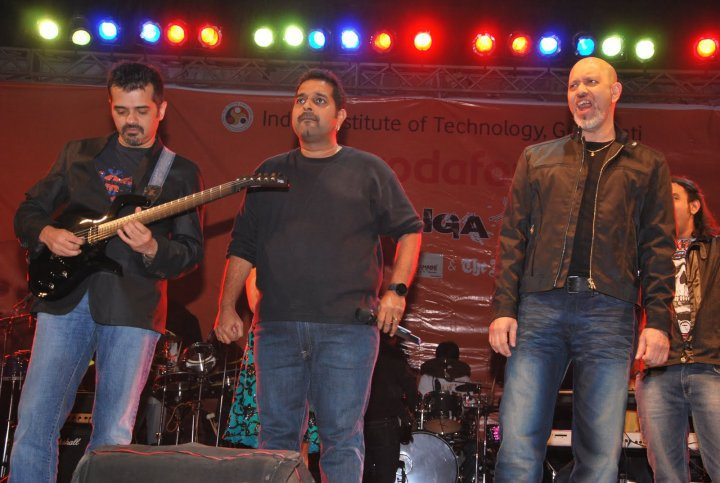
Shankar–Ehsaan–Loy at Alcheringa 2010

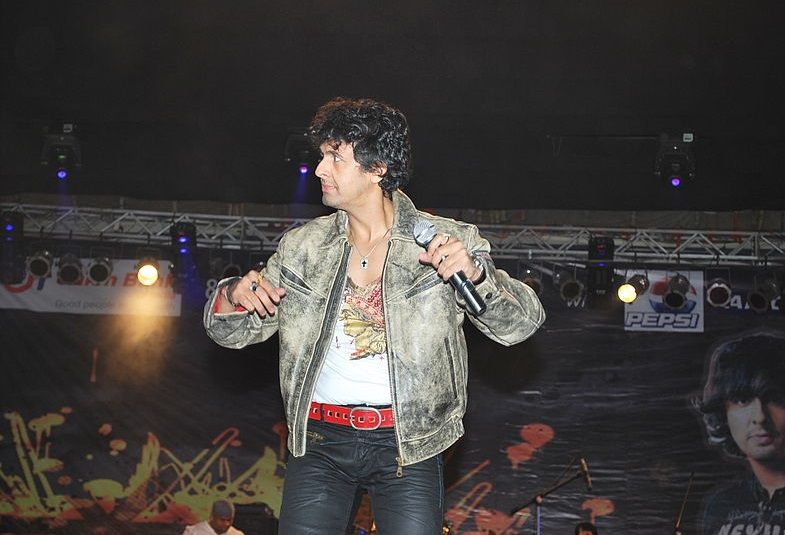
Sonu Nigam performing at Alcheringa 2009

== Events ==
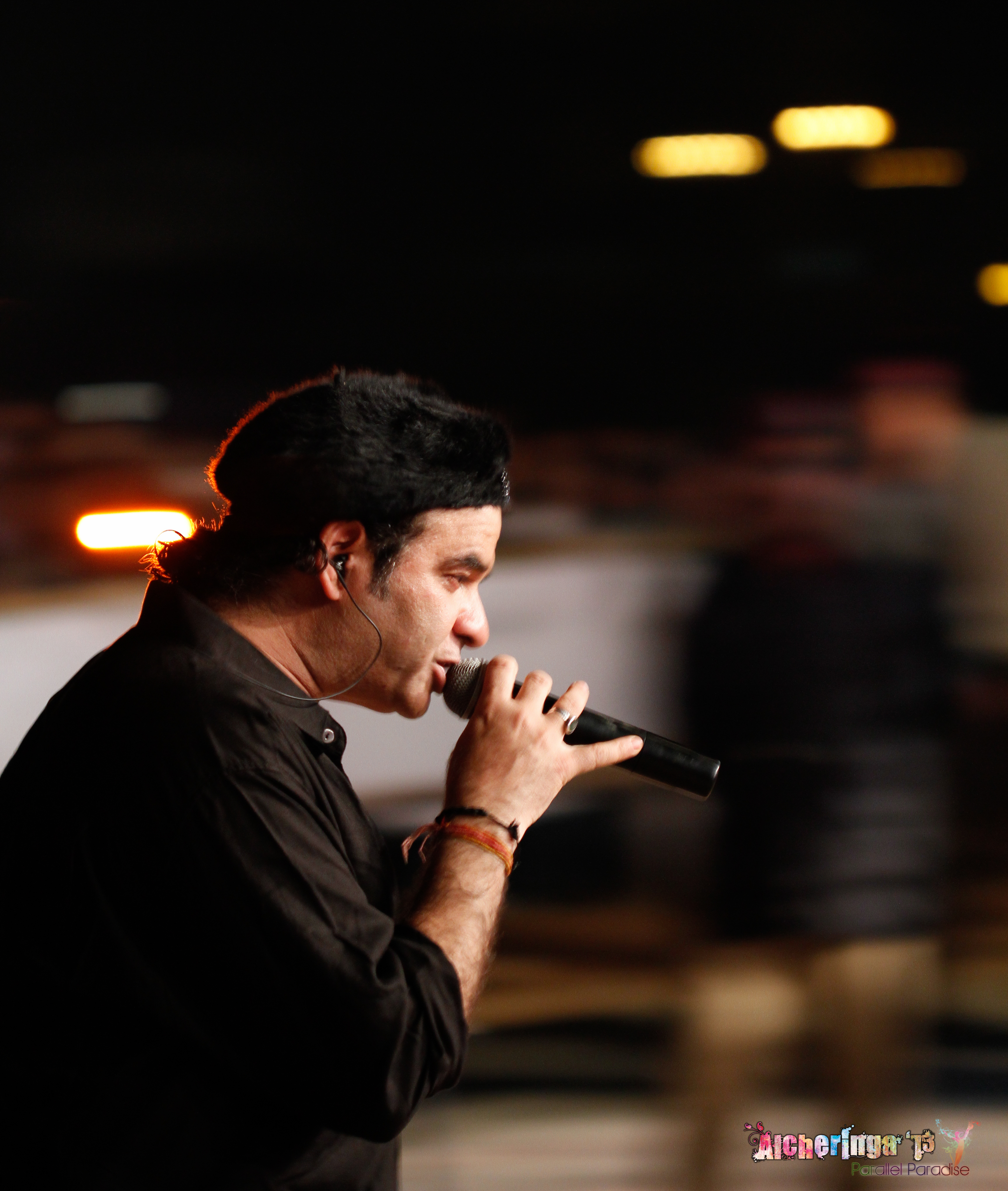
Mohit Chauhan performs at Alcheringa 2013

=== Pronites ===
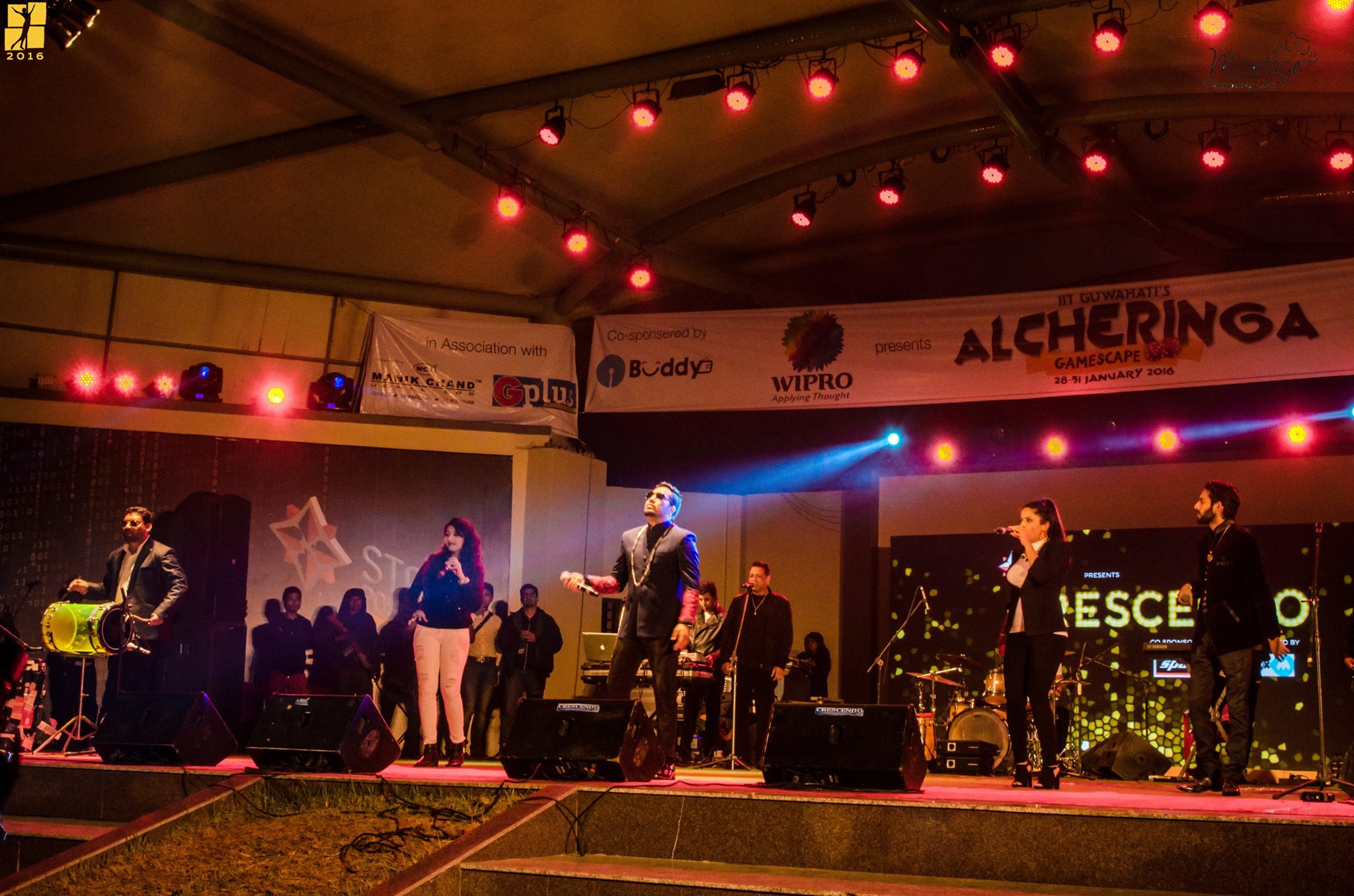
Mika Singh performing at Alcheringa 2016

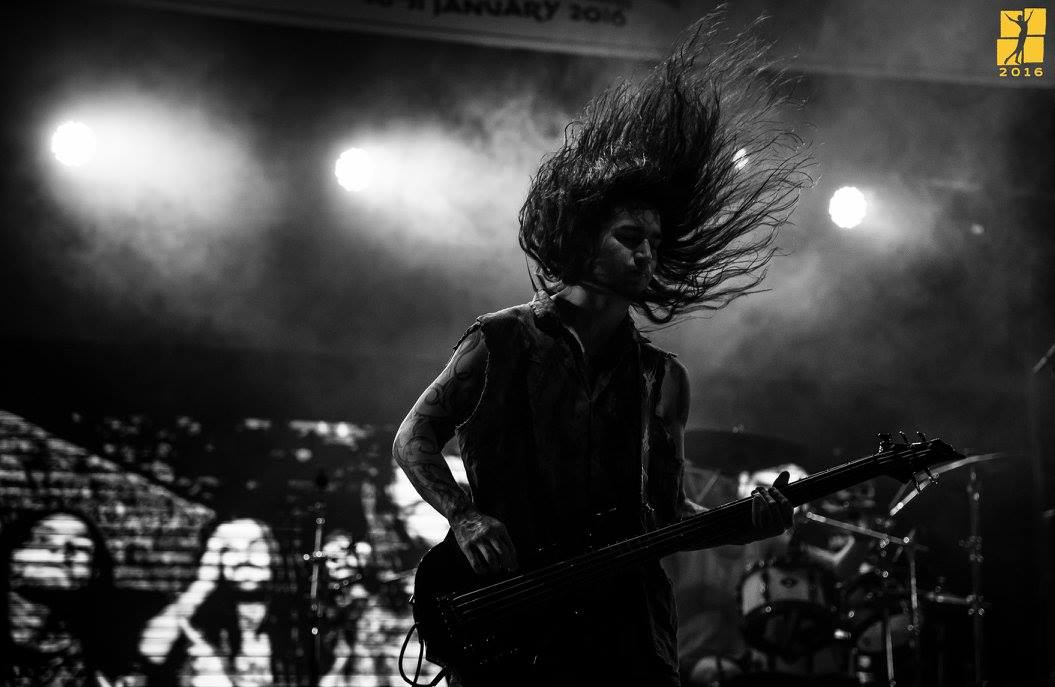
Meta Stasis performing at Alcheringa 2016

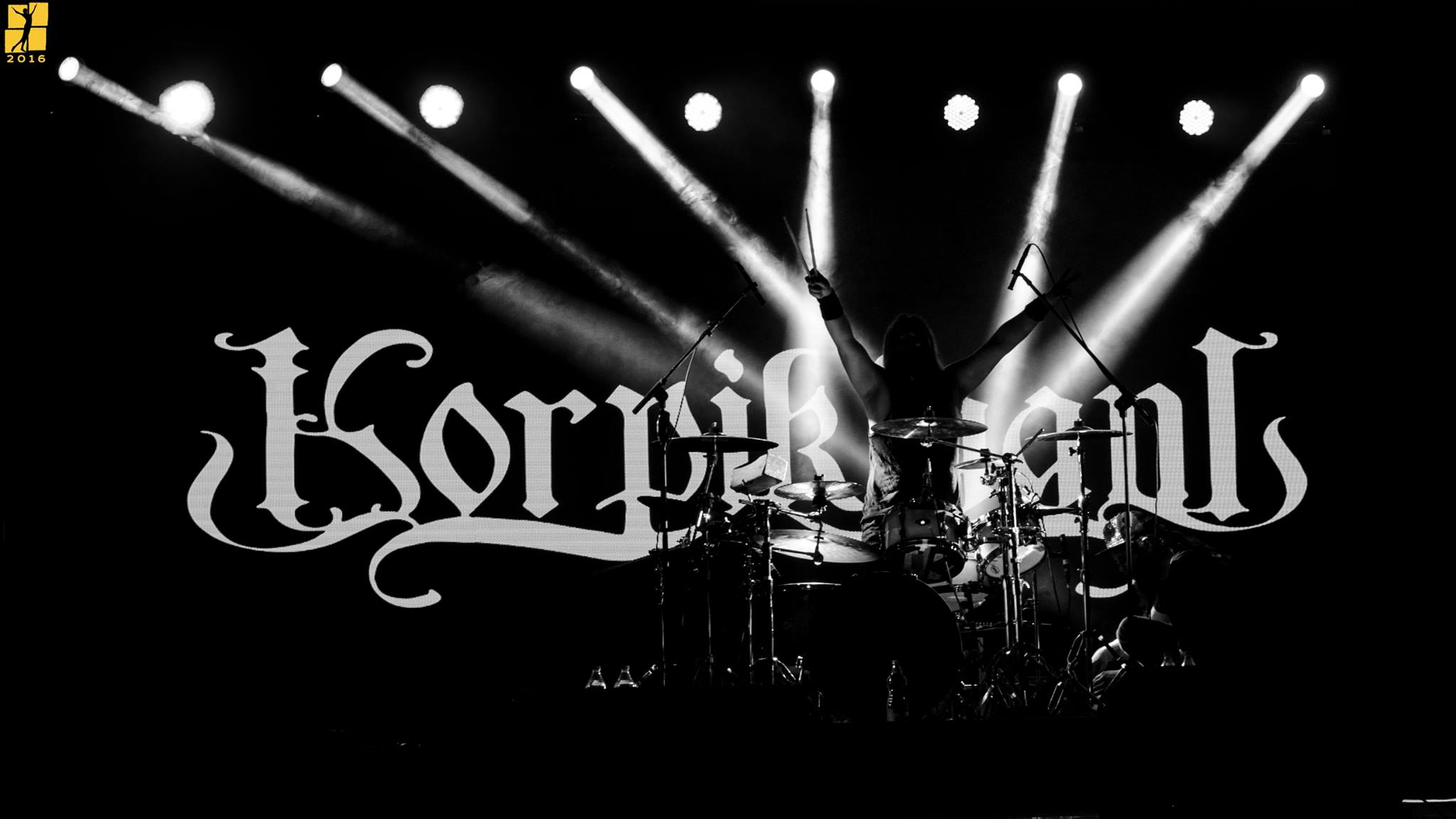
Korpikilaani performing at Alcheringa 2016

Some notable Indian artists who have earlier performed in Alcheringa are Mika Singh, Lucky Ali, Sonu Nigam, Shaan, Shankar–Ehsaan–Loy, K.K, Mohit Chauhan, Shilpa Rao, Javed Ali, Anoushka Shankar, Vir Das, Kalki Koechlin, Amaan and Ayaan Ali Khan, The Indian Jam Project, Grammy winners Ustaad Shujaat Khan and Pandit Vishwa Mohan Bhatt, Undying Inc, RDB, Remo Fernandes, Raghu Dixit, Euphoria, Indian Ocean, Vaayu, Motherjane.Parikrama

=== Competitions ===
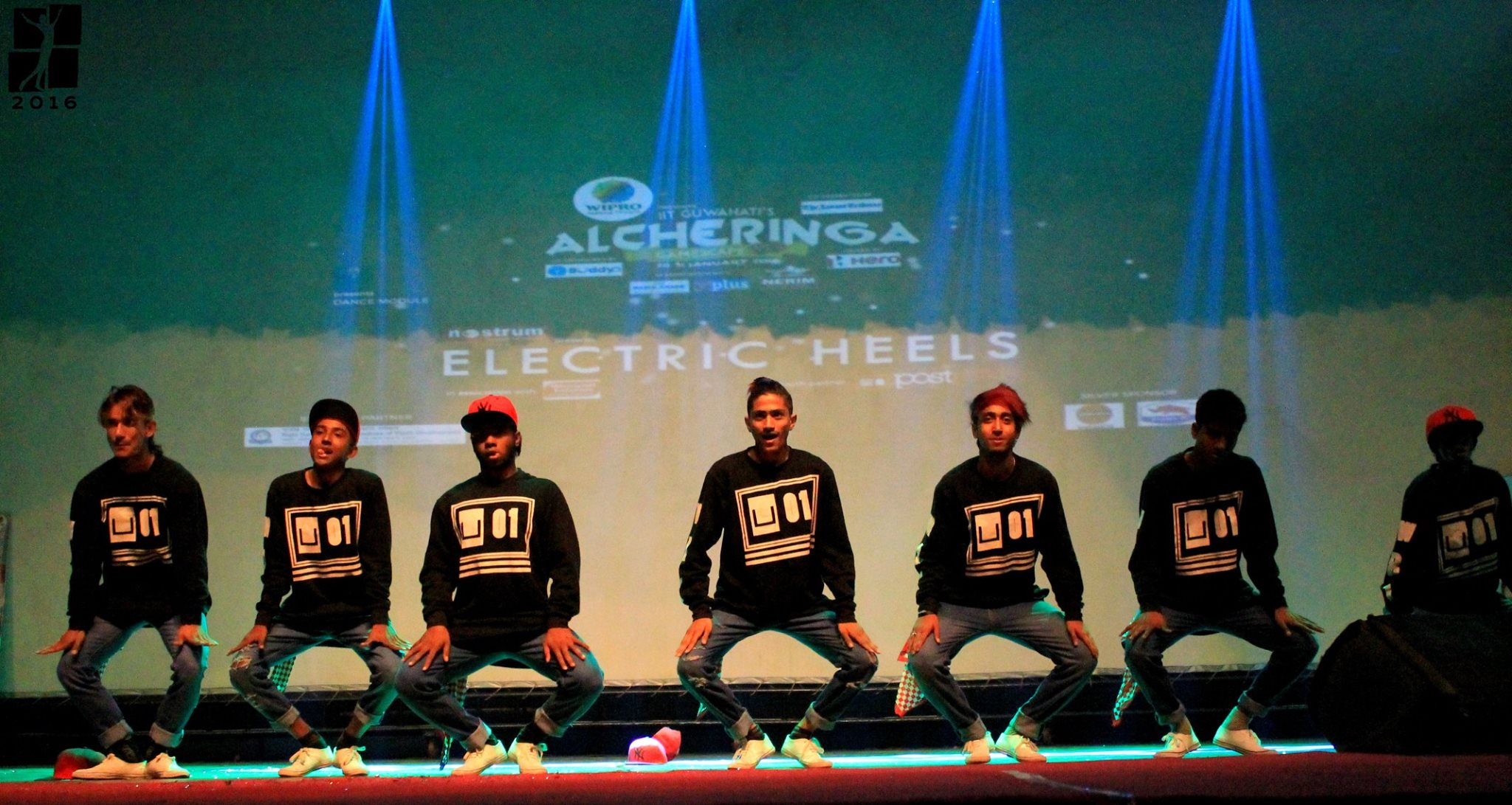
A performance during the finals of Electric Heels at Alcheringa 2016

Alcheringa hosts over 80 competitions. Some of the competitions held at Alcheringa are Electric Heels, the group dance competition, Voice of Alcheringa, the solo singing competition, Halla Bol, the street play competition, Rock-o-Phonix, the rock band competition, Mr. and Ms. Alcheringa, the personality contest, Crossfade, the scratching competition and Haute Couture, the team based fashion designing event.

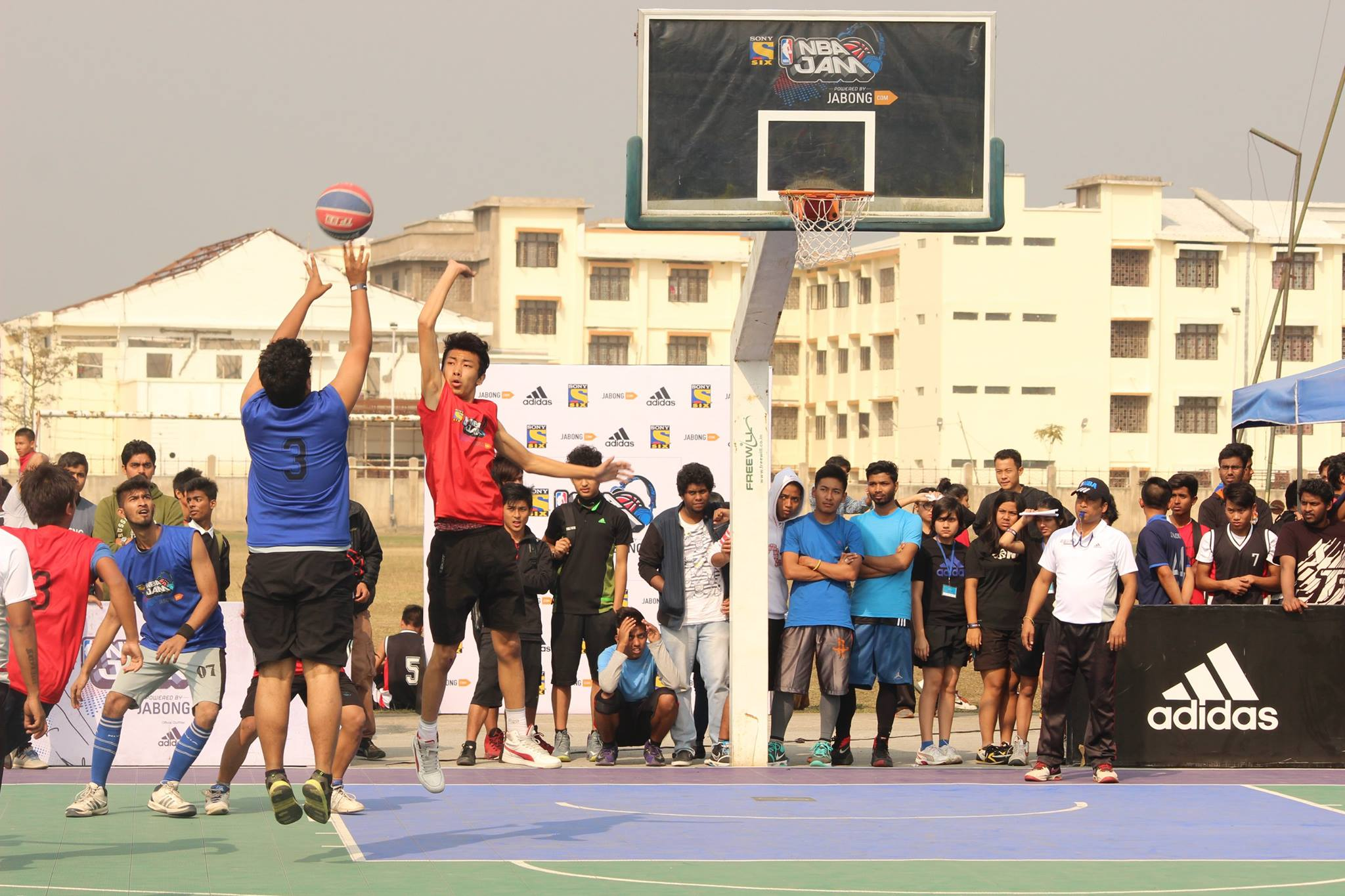
NBA Jam at Alcheringa 2016

The Campus Princess is another beauty pageant of Alcheringa which started in its 20th edition, was conducted in association with the Miss India Organisation. The Auditions for Campus Princess were judged by Miss Asia Pacific World 2013 Ms. Srishti Rana. Mute, the Mime competition was judged by Mr. Moinul Haque, the Sangeet Natak Academy Award winner.

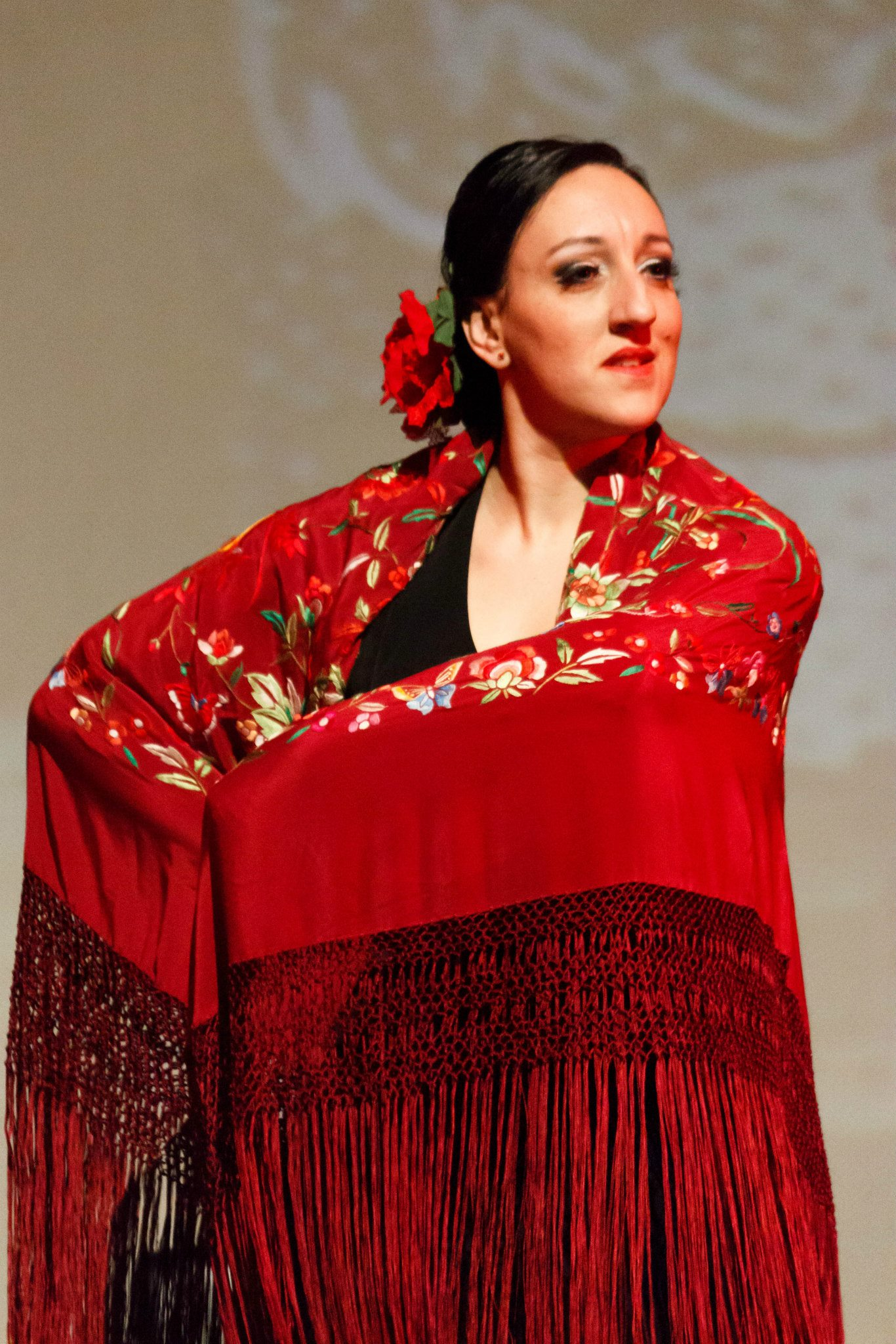
During the performance of Algeria Dance Company at Alcheringa 2015

=== World Carnival ===
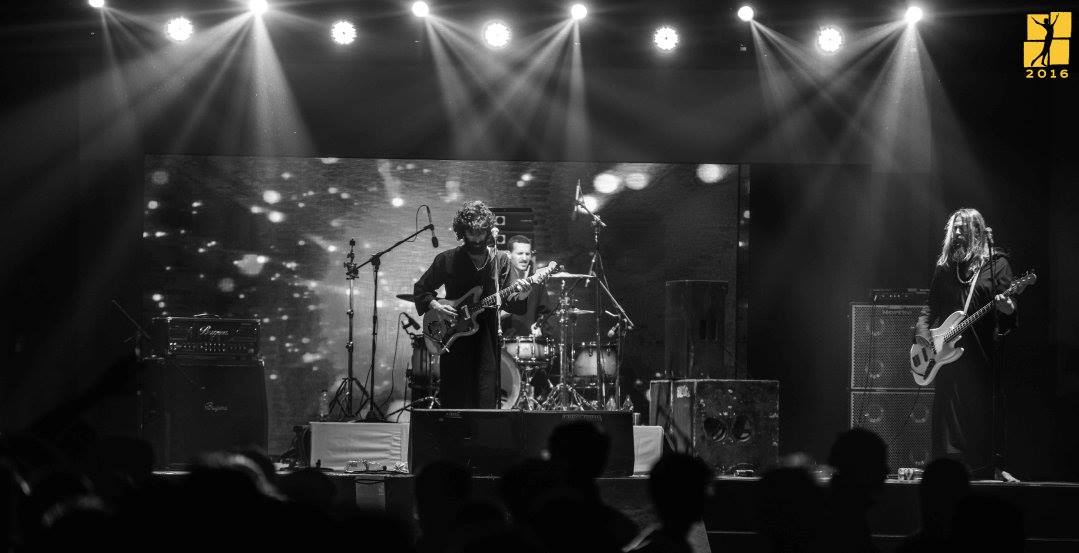
Israeli psychedelic rock band Ouzo Bazooka perform at the World Carnival, Alcheringa 2016.

World Carnival is an initiative by Alcheringa to promote cultures from across the world here in the North-Eastern part of the country. Alcheringa has had artists like Ciorras and Fastest feet in Rhythm from the United States, Ne Obliviscaris and poet Omar Musa from Australia, Fasta Duo and Murray Molloy from Ireland, beatboxer Rizumik from Portugal, rock bands Ouzo Bazooka, Tiny Fingers and Orphaned Land from Israel.

Alcheringa has also had the jazz band Tropic Green from Singapore, the Portuguese horn player Mickael Faustino, the Algeria Dance Company from Malta, Hungarian flutist David Simon and pianist Janos Palojtay, the German Classical jazz performer Mito, alternate pop music band BETTY from the USA and English hypnotist Andrew Newton and extreme technical metal band Meta Stasis.

== Campaigns ==
=== Udaan: Giving Flights to Hope ===
Udaan is a social initiative by Alcheringa wherein the students of IIT Guwahati visit underprivileged children in various corners of India. Udaan reached 52 cities in 2016. In Alcheringa 2018, "Desh Ka Sandesh" was organised under the umbrella of Udaan.

=== North East Unveiled ===
The underlying idea of the campaign North-East Unveiled is to promote a shared identity of North-East India with the rest of the nation while promoting its tourism, food, general practices and removing any stereotypes about North East India. This was done by releasing a series of videos highlighting the above. The North East Social Entrepreneurship Summit and The North East Townhall Discussions were held during Alcheringa 2016.

== Sponsors and past associates ==
Alcheringa has in the past associated with freecharge, Swiggy, OnePlus, Hero MotoCorp, Wipro, State Bank of India, Indian Oil, Maruti Suzuki, Ola, FastTrack, Daikin, Viber, Coca-Cola, KitKat and Baskin Robbins.

In the media sector, Alcheringa has been associated with the RED FM, The Telegraph, The Assam Tribune, Business India, North East Today, Metalbase India, etc.
