= The Mountain (Gorillaz album) =

2026 studio album by Gorillaz

Studio album by Gorillaz
- Released: 27 February 2026
- Recorded: 2001–2010 (Note: Select elements of tracks 1–2, 4, 8 and 10–11 were recorded in this timeframe.); 2024–2025
- Studio: Studio 13 (London and Devon, UK) (Note: All tracks); Island City (Mumbai, India) (Note: Tracks 1–3, 6–14); 5020 (Miami, Florida, US) (Note: Tracks 2, 5); Criteria (Miami, Florida, US); Jaipur, India (Note: Tracks 3, 8); Rishikesh, India (Note: Tracks 12, 14); Various additional: Kintsugi (New Delhi, India) (Note: Track 1); Amber Fort, Rajasthan, India; The Ghats, Varanasi, India (Note: Track 2); Amritsar, India (Note: Track 3); Ashgabat, Turkmenistan; Sparks Studio (Los Angeles, California); Haridwar, India (Note: Track 9); Damascus, Syria (Note: Track 11); New York City, US
- Genres: World; synth-pop; psychedelia
- Length: 66:22
- Languages: English; Spanish; Arabic; Hindi; Yoruba; Russian
- Labels: Kong; The Orchard
- Producers: Gorillaz; James Ford; Samuel Egglenton; Remi Kabaka Jr.; Bizarrap

Gorillaz chronology
Cracker Island (2023)	The Mountain (2026)

Damon Albarn chronology
Bahidorá (2025)	The Mountain (2026)

Singles from The Mountain
- 1. "The Happy Dictator" Released: 11 September 2025; 2. "The Manifesto" Released: 8 October 2025; 3. "The God of Lying" Released: 6 November 2025; 4. "Damascus" Released: 12 December 2025; 5. "The Hardest Thing" / "Orange County" Released: 15 January 2026

The Mountain (title written in Devanagari as पर्वत, parvata, "mountain" in Sanskrit) is the ninth studio album by British virtual band Gorillaz. It was released on 27 February 2026 through their own label, Kong, with distribution by Sony Music subsidiary the Orchard. It is the first Gorillaz album to be released without the participation of Parlophone.

Recorded across India, London and other locations, the album draws heavily from Indian classical instrumentation, alongside the group's eclectic electronic and pop influences, and features performances in multiple languages, including English, Arabic, Hindi, Spanish, and Yoruba. Thematically, the album focuses on death, grief, and the afterlife, inspired by Gorillaz creators Damon Albarn and Jamie Hewlett both experiencing the deaths of close family members during its production. It continues the band's tradition of featuring collaborations with a wide ranging assortment of musicians, including Asha Bhosle, Asha Puthli, Black Thought, Idles, Johnny Marr, Anoushka Shankar, Sparks, Omar Souleyman, Trueno, and Yasiin Bey; as well as posthumous appearances from previous Gorillaz collaborators such as Dennis Hopper, Bobby Womack, David Jolicoeur (of De La Soul), Tony Allen, Proof, and Mark E. Smith, in keeping with the album's themes. The album was produced by Albarn, Remi Kabaka Jr., James Ford, and Samuel Egglenton.

The Mountain was debuted and performed in full in September 2025 at a show during Gorillaz's 25th anniversary "House of Kong" exhibition, with a supporting tour in 2026. The album received widespread critical acclaim for its thematic ambition, emotional depth and stylistic cohesion. The Mountain debuted at number one on the UK Albums Chart and number seven on the US Billboard 200, earning Gorillaz their third number one album in the UK.

== Background ==
The first mention of Gorillaz's ninth album came from an interview with Damon Albarn ahead of their headlining Coachella 2023 performance, commenting that it would "take [Albarn & Jamie Hewlett] somewhere [they've] never been before". Albarn further described it as a "paradigm shift" and "very different" in a July 2023 interview with the Broken Record podcast. Later, in a December 2023 interview for Les Inrockuptibles, Albarn stated that work would begin on the album following the completion of The Magic Flute II: La Malédiction, his adaptation of The Magic Flute Part Two, and that he and Hewlett would travel to India to do so. In March 2025, Albarn told Les Inrockuptibles that the album was nearing completion, and in a later interview with Radio Nova he mentioned it would be complete in six weeks' time.

Albarn and Hewlett both experienced the loss of close family members prior to their time in India. Both described the album as a cohesive and conceptual work exploring ideas of death and the afterlife through the band's fictional characters. Hewlett said people listening to the album are "supposed to listen to it from beginning to end", saying that they were "trying to bring back that idea of taking time to invest in something, instead of this culture of scrolling". The album's name was inspired by the duo's first visit to Amber Fort in Jaipur, as well as a mountain they visited in western China during the production of the opera Monkey: Journey to the West.

On 3 September 2025, the album was revealed and performed live in its entirety as the final "mystery show" of four shows coinciding with Gorillaz's 25th anniversary "House of Kong" museum and art exhibition in London, which also saw them perform the entirety of the band's first three albums: Gorillaz (2001), Demon Days (2005) and Plastic Beach (2010). Eight days later, on 11 September, the band officially announced the album, revealing the title, cover artwork, and the original release date of 20 March 2026 and releasing the lead single "The Happy Dictator" concurrently. A deluxe version of the album was also later announced, as well as a Special Edition a few days after the album's release. The album was initially announced for release on 20 March 2026, before being brought forward to 27 February 2026. The album's liner notes states that it is dedicated to both Albarn and Hewlett's late fathers, Hewlett's late mother-in-law Amo, and past Gorillaz collaborators: Lou Reed, Ibrahim Ferrer, Dennis Hopper, Proof, Mark E. Smith, Tony Allen, Bobby Womack, David Jolicoeur, Ike Turner, Terry Hall, MF Doom and Craig Duffy.

== Recording ==
From left to right: Gruff Rhys, Anoushka Shankar, Paul Simonon, Joe Talbot, Black Thought, Asha Bhosle, Jalen Ngonda, Ajay Prasanna, Bizarrap, Trueno, Sparks, Kara Jackson, Johnny Marr, Mark E. Smith, David Jolicoeur, Proof, Asha Puthli, Yasiin Bey and Omar Souleyman. Murals of Tony Allen, Bobby Womack and Dennis Hopper. Artwork by Jamie Hewlett.

In keeping with the album's themes, Damon Albarn decided to include unused vocal takes from previous Gorillaz collaborators who had passed away, including soul singer Bobby Womack; rapper David Jolicoeur from De La Soul; actor Dennis Hopper; English vocalist Mark E. Smith of English post-punk band the Fall; rapper Proof from D12; and drummer Tony Allen, the last of whom Albarn had collaborated with extensively throughout his career, including as part of the band the Good, the Bad & the Queen. The vocal takes that were used on the album were either unused or alternate vocal takes from prior recording sessions, with the only condition that Albarn imposed upon himself and the production team was that they would not use any vocal takes that had been used on any previously released material. "I just thought, if we're going to talk about the subject of death, I need some people who are dead to help me talk about it", said Albarn. Albarn had also wanted to include vocals from the late Terry Hall, after he collaborated with the band on their 2001 standalone single "911", but found that the engineer of the session had removed any unused vocals. Albarn had also wanted to include unused vocals from the late rapper MF Doom, whom they had previously collaborated with on "November Has Come" from their second album, Demon Days; however, was unable to do so, as Albarn discovered that the material from their sessions together had already been used by the album's producer, Danger Mouse, on another project.

The album's opening song, "The Mountain", was recorded after Albarn and Hewlett visited Amber Fort in Rajasthan. Albarn recorded a musician playing a Rajasthan folk song on a ravanahatha, which formed the basis of the song, which Albarn later re-worked in his hotel room. Albarn then recorded the song with the Hindu Jea Band Jaipur, in Jaipur. The vocals of the late Dennis Hopper can be heard on the song, which come from multiple outtakes of Hopper's appearance on "Fire Coming Out of the Monkey's Head" from Demon Days.

"The Moon Cave" is named in reference to the book The Mind in the Cave: Consciousness and the Origins of Art by David Lewis-Williams, which Albarn gave his late father before he died. The song features contributions from the late David Jolicoeur (frequently known as Trugoy the Dove) of De La Soul, who collaborated with the band extensively in his later life. Jolicoeur's contributions to the song came from an unreleased song from the band's third album Plastic Beach called "Float Tropics", while Womack's contributions were taken from an outtake of a conversation Womack was having with Albarn during a recording session. The inclusion of Asha Puthli was suggested by one of the album's producers, James Ford, while Black Thought was suggested by Remi Kabaka Jr.

The lead single, "The Happy Dictator", was inspired by Albarn's visit to Turkmenistan, where he learned of the dictator Saparmyrat Nyýazow, also known as Türkmenbaşy. In an interview with Jack Saunders on BBC Radio 1, Albarn said of the song: "The point of 'The Happy Dictator' is that the Türkmenbaşy wanted everyone in Turkmenistan to only think happy thoughts and sleep unaffected by the doom of the world, and just keep everything upbeat, so he kind of banned all bad news. When I was there, I was kind of inspired by that". The song features the American band Sparks – a collaboration which came about after the band left a note in Albarn's dressing room at the Primavera Sound Festival encouraging him to reach out to them if he wished to collaborate in the future. The band hinted at a collaboration between the two with an Instagram post of the group in Albarn's studio in London.

"The Empty Dream Machine", which features Black Thought, Johnny Marr & Anoushka Shankar, was inspired by a toy released in 1978 by Mattel, in collaboration with American music group, the Bee Gees, called The Dream Machine. Albarn had previously hoped to work with one of the band's members, Barry Gibb on Plastic Beach, but the collaboration never came to fruition, which Albarn described as "...my 'empty dream machine' was real—not just in the sense of a metal toy". On the song, Black Thought makes references to the album's song "The Shadowy Light", collaborator Asha Bhosle, and her 1971 song "Dum Maro Dum". Before recording Asha Puthli's contributions for "The Moon Cave" in Miami, Albarn left his gold tooth on a table after eating burritos and forgot to pick his tooth back up and later had to retrieve it from a large waste container – the incident is referenced on "The Empty Dream Machine" by Black Thought.

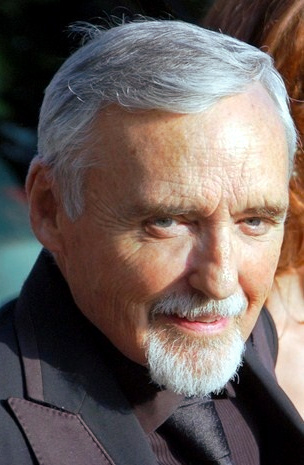
Unused vocal takes from actor Dennis Hopper, who had previously worked with the group on their second album, Demon Days, were used on the album's title track.

The song "Orange County" features guest contributions from Anoushka Shankar and Kara Jackson, as well as additional production from Bizarrap, who also produced an alternative mix of the song. Albarn was introduced to Jackson's music through Little Simz, who the band had previously worked with on the Humanz bonus track "Garage Palace". Albarn had originally planned for the song to feature Mexican singer and rapper Peso Pluma, and even travelled to his recording studio in Orange County. Although the collaboration ultimately did not come to fruition, it inspired the song's title.

The album's second single, "The Manifesto", features late rapper Proof, whom the band had worked with on "911" in 2001, as well as Argentinian rapper Trueno, with Proof's contributions believed to be an unused freestyle from those sessions. The song also features an uncredited appearance from flautist Ajay Shankar Prasanna. Prasanna, who recorded his contributions in New Delhi, chose to play Dhani and Malkauns ragas on the song. In an interview with Zane Lowe on Beats 1, Albarn and Hewlett revealed that the song's name is in part a reference to the band's original manifesto, in which Albarn and Hewlett had specified that the band's drummer, Russel Hobbs, would be able to call on the spirits of deceased musicians to collaborate with. The song also features contributions brothers Amaan Ali Bangash and Ayaan Ali Bangash, the Jea Band Jaipur, and the Mountain Choir.

"The Plastic Guru" was inspired by a visit Albarn and Hewlett took to an ashram in Rishikesh. They later realised, however, that the guru they encountered had already researched them in advance. The meeting became increasingly uncomfortable, culminating with the pair seated beside the guru during a ceremony on the banks of the Ganges, where they discovered the event was being broadcast on television across India. Hewlett said of the encounter: "That was the only one, of all the beautiful experiences in India, that I felt a little bit jaded by." The encounter influenced the song's title and creation. The band had intended to include unused vocals from late American musician Lou Reed – whom they had previously collaborated with on "Some Kind of Nature", from Plastic Beach – on the song. However, Reed's estate did not give the band permission to do so, as Reed had left strict instructions that his music must not be used posthumously. The band instead re-recorded Reed's original lyrics through a voice synthesizer to resemble HAL 9000 from Stanley Kubrick's 1968 film 2001: A Space Odyssey.

"Damascus" was originally recorded for inclusion on Plastic Beach; however, the song was left off the finished project in favour of the song "Sweepstakes". In a 2023 interview with Zane Lowe, Albarn confirmed the original title was "Fresh Arrivals", and featured Yasiin Bey and Syrian dabke artist Omar Souleyman. The song marks Bey's third collaboration with the group following the aforementioned "Sweepstakes" and the single "Stylo". Speaking of the collaboration with The National, Souleyman said: "Of course, I was pleased that Gorillaz reached out to me, because they are a huge band, even though I felt the weight of responsibility in front of such a major group, the conversation through music was easier than a conversation through words. I don't think Gorillaz chose me because I'm a famous name, but because I serve the band's idea of experimentation and breaking traditional moulds, the collaboration was a mutual addition: I bring the voice and the musical background, and they give me an important, well-known platform to present my art." The song was nominated for "Best Contemporary Song" for the 2026 Ivor Novello Awards.

The song "The Shadowy Light" features guest contributions from Gruff Rhys, Ajay Prasanna, Amaan Ali Bangash, Ayaan Ali Bangash and Asha Bhosle. Bhosle, who sings the Hindi hook "Majhi Re Majhi" on the song (which she had also recorded earlier in her career), had her words written by lyricist and dialogue writer Kausar Munir. Speaking of the song, Bhosle said: "I was hesitant to work on this album of Gorillaz, but when I heard the music track and the lyrics, it triggered something deep inside me. This was not one of those everyday kinds of songs. The lyrics held deep meaning, and I felt moved enough to accept this assignment." She further elaborated on the song's lyrics in a joint interview with Vogue India: "In one part of 'The Shadowy Light', I sing, 'Chal mere raahi, gehra hain paani, mujhe jaana hain uss paar.' I'm telling the boatman to ferry me across the river, which is my life's journey: my birth, my relationships, my dedication to music, my achievements, my duties as a mother, daughter, sister, wife and Indian. The boatman is a metaphor for my music, which has guided me across this river of life. When I get to the other side, my journey will be complete and I will attain moksha. If you listen carefully, you will be able to discern thousands of sounds floating around us. I shall become one of them. This freedom to become one with nature is what awaits me on the other side of the river." Bhosle's contributions were recorded at her apartment in Mumbai, with Albarn playing the harmonium, while James Ford recorded Bhosle's contributions with a boom mic. The band had previously attempted to work with Bhosle during the production of Plastic Beach, although the collaboration never came to fruition. The song would become Bhosle's final recording contribution before her death two months after the album's release in April 2026.

Niloy Ahsan worked with the band on the deluxe edition bonus track, "Bolly Noir", in which Ahsan sings in the dhrupad vocal style, one of the oldest in Hindustani classical music. Speaking of the collaboration, Ahsan further elaborated, saying: "During the recording, I was simply aligning breath and sound with the Tanpura. This is Nāda yoga; the yoga of sound. My Guru used to say that God resides between two consecutive notes. There is infinite space even within the smallest interval. To sing is to enter that infinitesimal infinity." Speaking of the song further, Albarn said: "I associate it with Sufism, ecstatic music. It takes me to people like Gurdjieff. Niloy's just beautiful. Gorgeous." Ahsan sings in Miyan ki Todi raga.

Throughout the production process, the band experimented with different recording techniques. During the recording of the track "The Sweet Prince", featured guest, Anoushka Shankar, suggested a multi-layered technique for the song's sitar portions, wherein Shankar's fast strumming created a layered cocoon for the song's vocals – a similar technique was used by the Beatles for their song "Love You To", from their 1966 album Revolver.

== Short film ==
The Mountain, the Moon Cave and the Sad God
- Official thumbnail from the band's official YouTube page
- Directed by: Jamie Hewlett; Max Taylor; Tim McCourt; Johnatan Djob Nkondo (sequence director)
- Story by: Jamie Hewlett
- Produced by: Gorillaz; Eleven Management; Eva Dahlqvist; Tan Baptista
- Starring: Gorillaz; Ajay Prasanna; Black Thought; Jalen Ngonda; David Jolicoeur
- Cinematography: Ed Tucker
- Edited by: Peter Scott
- Music by: Lead artist: Gorillaz; Featured guests: Ajay Prasanna; Amaan Ali Bangash; Anoushka Shankar; Asha Puthli; Ayaan Ali Bangash; Black Thought; Bobby Womack; David Jolicoeur; Jalen Ngonda
- Production companies: Kong; The Line
- Release dates: 26 February 2026 (premiere); 27 February 2026 (YouTube)
- Running time: 8 minutes
- Language: English

On 26 February 2026, the band premiered an 8-minute animated film directed by Hewlett, Johnatan Djob Nkondo, Max Taylor and Tim McCourt, entitled The Mountain, the Moon Cave and the Sad God.

The short film is made up of three songs from the album: the instrumental "The Mountain" (featuring Dennis Hopper, Ajay Prasanna, Anoushka Shankar, Amaan Ali Bangash, and Ayaan Ali Bangash), along with "The Moon Cave" (featuring Asha Puthli, Bobby Womack, Dave Jolicoeur, Jalen Ngonda, and Black Thought) and "The Sad God" (featuring Black Thought, Ajay Prasanna, and Anoushka Shankar). All three songs were produced by Gorillaz, James Ford, Samuel Egglenton, and Remi Kabaka Jr., while "The Moon Cave" featured additional production from Argentine producer Bizarrap.

=== Background ===
The short film was made entirely with hand-drawn animation, using techniques previously shown off in films such as One Hundred and One Dalmatians (1961) and The Jungle Book (1967), which Hewlett used as inspiration. It was made available on YouTube, on the same day as the album's release, and a day after the film's premiere at a number of locations around the world.

The film received an exclusive premiere at several Alamo Drafthouse Cinemas locations across the U.S., alongside a short documentary film. The release also saw the cinema host viewings of each virtual band member's favourite film over the course of a month: Sweet Charity (1969; Russel), Britannia Hospital (1982; Noodle), Bad Santa (2003; Murdoc) and Perfect Days (2023; 2-D).

=== Production ===
The film took 18 months to create, in collaboration with London production studio THE LINE, who the band had previously worked with on the music video for "Humility", as well as all of the music videos released during the band's Song Machine project. "The Moon Cave" segment of the film was directed by animator Johnatan Djob Nkondo.

In an interview with Cartoon Brew, Taylor and McCourt revealed that Hewlett worked on storyboards and animatics, with the team at The Line doing "a due diligence pass" before the video moved into full animation. "The whole film was very much an exercise in paying homage to something – researching all the references for how we could recreate that specific feeling. One thing we liked about the era was when they started Xeroxing or photocopying onto cel, which gave the quality of the cel a different look," said McCourt. To replicate the grain of celluloid film, the team used scans of actual film overlaid onto the shots. "Within the film there are lots of optical effects where we filmed live-action components. We then emulated the double exposures they would have done back in the day on film. As far as the grain, dirt, and noise, it's scanned film – blank film overlaid to give the final image that real film texture," said Taylor. The team also introduced gate weave – which gives the video the same characteristic wobble of film as it runs through a projector – to reinforce the film texture effect. For the glowing gold mountain logo that appears later in the film, the production team cut the logo out of a black acrylic sheet and rigged a rostrum camera setup, and then pumped smoke beneath the sheet. The logo's reveal was achieved by pouring black sand into the crack in the sheet to cover the logo, then reversing the footage.

The animation was created using traditional hand-drawn techniques by a team of artists, with additional practical effects incorporated into the film. During development, the creators closely studied the work of animators from 20th century films in order to replicate the compositional and aesthetic approaches of that era. Shot composition was designed to reflect the methods used in animated features of the 1960s, where artists often painted large "master" background artworks and then framed individual shots by cropping into those paintings. All backgrounds in the film were hand-painted. For many scenes, however, the production adopted a hybrid technique that combined traditional watercolor paintings with digital finishing and final paint adjustments. The production team also used smoke as a practical stand-in effect for waterfalls throughout the film. The film also features animated appearances from featured guests, Jalen Ngonda, Black Thought, and the late David Jolicoeur, who are all featured on "The Moon Cave".

Elements of the short film were shown during the band's live performance on Saturday Night Live.

=== Synopsis ===
The film opens with a live action book being turned, which transitions into a shot of a jungle. A young child, later revealed to be Noodle is seen exploring an unidentified jungle before she encounters the serpent, Vritra. She slides off the serpent's back into the jungle's water, and as she swims out, she has grown into an adult. She notices a flautist playing the flute in the water nearby and steals his clothes. She then encounters her fellow bandmates: 2-D, Murdoc and Russel. Together, the band embark on a journey to a nearby mountain.

Eventually, the group reach "the moon cave" where animals sing and the paintings on the wall come to life, including those of rappers Black Thought and Trugoy the Dove. They eventually reach the end of the cave, where they are met by Tarakeshwara, who takes them to the middle of a lake. Noodle then plunges into the depths of the lake. 2-D and Russel soon follow. Back on the boat, Murdoc is hesitant until the boatman grins at him, after which he nervously gets up, trips and falls into the water. The group slowly descend to the depths of the lake, as the scene fades to a view of Earth from space at sunrise, and then to the logo of the album.

== Release ==
The logo used for the album in its packaging and promotion.

The band are scheduled to promote the album further through The Mountain Tour, with concerts in Europe between March and June 2026. A deluxe version of the album was also announced, with the addition of four bonus tracks, which include contributions from Niloy Ahsan and Pamela Jain, as well as additional contributions from the Hindu Jea Band Jaipur and Anoushka Shankar, who both contributed to the standard edition of the album too. One of the bonus tracks is a cover of Kishore Kumar's "Mere Sapno Ki Rani", from the 1969 Bollywood film Aradhana.

On 17 September, the band premiered the song "Damascus" at Brian Eno's Together for Palestine concert at Wembley Arena in London alongside Omar Souleyman and Yasiin Bey, where Bey also recited the English translation of Imam Muhammad b. Nāsir al-Darʿī's The Prayer of the Oppressed. On 8 October, the band released "The Manifesto" as the second single. On 6 November, the band released "The God of Lying" as the third single. On 2 December, an additional "House of Kong" exhibition in Los Angeles was announced, alongside two shows of the full album at the Hollywood Palladium in February 2026. On 12 December, "Damascus" was released as the album's fourth single. On the same day, Gorillaz announced that The Mountain would now be released earlier, on 27 February 2026.

On 15 January, the band released "The Hardest Thing" and "Orange County" as a double single. Argentinian producer Bizarrap, who worked on the latter, released an alternate mix of the song a week later, on 23 January. The band performed the single on The Graham Norton Show on 13 February, with guests, Kara Jackson and Anoushka Shankar.

On 27 February 2026, the same day of worldwide release of the album, the first dates for the Latin American leg were announced.

On 3 March 2026, the band announced the North American leg of The Mountain Tour, running from September to October. As part of the tour, the band will perform at the Shaky Knees Music Festival in Atlanta, Georgia. The band will be supported on the tour by Little Simz and Deltron 3030.

On 7 March 2026, the band promoted the album as the musical guests on Saturday Night Live, with guest host, Ryan Gosling, marking the band's first ever appearance on the show, performing "Clint Eastwood" with Del the Funky Homosapien and "The Moon Cave" with Asha Puthli, Black Thought & Anoushka Shankar.

On 9 April 2026, Gorillaz announced their debut in India, where The Mountain was based, with two dates in Bengaluru and Mumbai in January 2027. On the same day, a recorded performance of "The Happy Dictator", alongside Sparks, aired at Jimmy Kimmel Live!. On 10 September 2026, a third Indian date in Guwahati was also confirmed.

== Critical reception ==
Professional ratings
Aggregate scores
Source	Rating
AnyDecentMusic?	7.8/10
Metacritic	86/100
Review scores
Source	Rating
AllMusic	4.5/5 stars
DIY	4/5 stars
The Guardian	4/5 stars
The Independent	5/5 stars
The Line of Best Fit	8/10
Mojo	4/5 stars
Pitchfork	6.7/10
Record Collector	4/5 stars
Slant Magazine	4/5 stars
Uncut	4.5/5 stars

According to the review aggregator Metacritic, The Mountain received "universal acclaim" based on a weighted average score of 86 out of 100 from 24 critic scores. The aggregator website AnyDecentMusic? gave the album a weighted average score of 7.8 out of 10 from 30 critic scores.

Writing for Record Collector, Kevin Harley praised the album's expansive vision and reflective tone, describing the record as "a record of sorrows, salves and state-of-the-now despair", commending the album's ability to unite a wide range of genres and collaborators. Grace Dillon of Still Listening characterised The Mountain as a bold and emotionally resonant work, noting its synthesis of Indian musical influences with the group's established eclectic sound. Dillon emphasised the album's exploration of grief, transcendence, and turning personal grief into a kaleidoscopic meditation on life, death, and renewal. In a four-star review, NME's Andrew Trendell hailed the album as "a full-bodied world-building affair; arguably their most rich and complete since Plastic Beach", while Uncut noted, "Albarn has, of course, explored grief on many occasions – Gorillaz's 'Andromeda', Blur's The Ballad of Darren and the title track to his solo album The Nearer the Fountain, More Pure the Stream Flows... are all mournful elegies to departed friends and loved ones; countless other Blur and Gorillaz songs mourn the death of relationships. You would expect an entire album with death at its central theme to be similarly hymnal, sombre and funereal, but The Mountain somehow manages to be none of these things. Its 15 tracks are filled with cheery major-key singalongs, sitar-soaked synth-pop bangers and whimsical waltzes that serve as ecstatic celebrations of life, rebirth and reinvention."

== Commercial performance ==
The Mountain debuted at number-one the U.K.’s Official Albums Chart and joins the band's 2005 album Demon Days and 2023's Cracker Island as chart-topping albums, The Official Charts Company reports that with its 30,000 units in the opening week, The Mountain is the biggest independent release of 2026 so far.

The Mountain debuted at number seven on the US Billboard 200 with first-week sales of 53,000 equivalent album units, which includes 38,000 in pure album sales and 15,000 streaming units. It became the group's sixth top-ten record in the United States.

== Track listing ==
All tracks are written by Damon Albarn and the tracks' respective guest(s) and produced by Gorillaz, James Ford, Samuel Egglenton, and Remi Kabaka Jr., except where noted.

The Mountain – Standard edition
No.	Title	Writer(s)	Producer(s)	Length
1.	"The Mountain" (featuring Dennis Hopper, Ajay Prasanna, Anoushka Shankar, Amaan Ali Bangash, and Ayaan Ali Bangash)	Albarn; Prasanna; Shankar		4:50
2.	"The Moon Cave" (featuring Asha Puthli, Bobby Womack, Dave Jolicoeur, Jalen Ngonda, and Black Thought)	Albarn; Jolicoeur; Tariq Trotter; Ford	Gorillaz; Ford; Egglenton; Kabaka; Bizarrap^{[a]}	4:57
3.	"The Happy Dictator" (featuring Sparks)			4:44
4.	"The Hardest Thing" (featuring Tony Allen)	Albarn		2:18
5.	"Orange County" (featuring Bizarrap, Kara Jackson, and Anoushka Shankar)	Albarn; Gonzalo Conde; Jackson; Santiago Alvarado	Gorillaz; Bizarrap; Egglenton^{[a]}; Kabaka^{[a]}	3:28
6.	"The God of Lying" (featuring Idles)	Albarn; Joseph Talbot		3:09
7.	"The Empty Dream Machine" (featuring Black Thought, Johnny Marr, and Anoushka Shankar)			5:40
8.	"The Manifesto" (featuring Trueno and Proof)			7:19
9.	"The Plastic Guru" (featuring Johnny Marr and Anoushka Shankar)			3:14
10.	"Delirium" (featuring Mark E. Smith)			3:52
11.	"Damascus" (featuring Omar Souleyman and Yasiin Bey)			4:04
12.	"The Shadowy Light" (featuring Asha Bhosle, Gruff Rhys, Ajay Prasanna, Amaan Ali Bangash, and Ayaan Ali Bangash)	Albarn; Kausar Munir; Rhys		5:39
13.	"Casablanca" (featuring Paul Simonon and Johnny Marr)	Albarn; Marr		3:46
14.	"The Sweet Prince" (featuring Ajay Prasanna, Johnny Marr, and Anoushka Shankar)	Albarn; Marr; Shankar		4:33
15.	"The Sad God" (featuring Black Thought, Ajay Prasanna, and Anoushka Shankar)	Albarn; Trotter; Shankar		4:49
Total length:				66:22

The Mountain – Deluxe tracks – Disc two
No.	Title	Writer(s)	Producer(s)	Length
1.	"Bolly Noir" (featuring Niloy Ahsan)		Gorillaz; Ford; Egglenton	6:20
2.	"Noah's Descendants" (featuring Anoushka Shankar and Pamela Jain)	Albarn; Shankar	Gorillaz; Egglenton; Kabaka	2:11
3.	"The Mountain" (performed by Hindu Jea Band Jaipur)	Albarn; Prasanna; Shankar		1:26
4.	"Meri Sapno Ki Rani" (performed by Hindu Jea Band Jaipur)	Sachin Dev Burman; Anand Bakshi		3:04
Total length:				13:01

The Mountain – Special Digital Edition
No.	Title	Length
1.	"The Story of the Mountain"	2:24

Notes

- ^{^[a]} indicates an additional producer

== Personnel ==
Credits adapted from the album's liner notes and Tidal.

=== Musicians ===
- Damon Albarn – vocals
- Dennis Hopper – spoken word (track 1)
- Ajay Prasanna – bansuri (tracks 1–4, 6, 8, 12, 14–15)
- Anoushka Shankar – sitar (tracks 1–2, 5, 7, 9, 14–15, 17)
- Amaan Ali Bangash – sarod (tracks 1, 8, 12)
- Ayaan Ali Bangash – sarod (tracks 1, 8, 12)
- Viraj Acharya – percussion (tracks 1–3, 6–8, 10–13)
- Asha Puthli – vocals (track 2)
- Bobby Womack – vocals (track 2)
- Dave Jolicoeur – vocals (track 2)
- Jalen Ngonda – vocals (track 2)
- Black Thought – vocals (tracks 2, 7, 15)
- Izzi Dunn – cello (tracks 2, 4, 8, 10, 13)
- Kotono Sato – violin (tracks 2, 4, 8, 10, 13)
- Sarah Tuke – violin (tracks 2, 4, 8, 10, 13)
- Ciara Ismail – viola (tracks 2, 4, 8, 10, 13)
- Olivia Jageurs – harp (tracks 2, 14)
- The Mountain Choir^{[c]} – backing vocals (tracks 3, 8–9, 12–13, 15)
- Russell Mael – vocals (track 3)
- Tony Allen – spoken word (track 4)
- Chris Storr – trumpet (tracks 4, 8)
- Kara Jackson – vocals (track 5), backing vocals (track 14)
- Santiago Alvarado – keyboards (track 5)
- Joseph Talbot – vocals (track 6)
- Rebecca Freckleton – backing vocals (track 7)
- Jesse Appiah – backing vocals (track 7)
- Johnny Marr – electric guitar (tracks 7, 9, 13–14)
- Trueno – vocals (track 8)
- Proof – vocals (track 8)
- Bharat Singh – tabla (track 8)
- Hindu Jea Band Jaipur – brass (tracks 8, 18–19)
- Matthew Gunner – French horn (tracks 8, 15)
- Mark E. Smith – vocals (track 10)
- Vlad – spoken word (track 10)
- Samuel Egglenton – additional programming (track 10)
- Omar Souleyman – vocals (track 11)
- Yasiin Bey – vocals (track 11)
- Asha Bhosle – vocals (track 12)
- Gruff Rhys – vocals (track 12)
- Paul Simonon – backing vocals (track 13)
- Niloy Ahsan – vocals (track 16)
- Pamela Jain – vocals (track 17)

=== Technical ===
- Damon Albarn – production
- Samuel Egglenton – engineering (all tracks), production (tracks 1–4, 6–17), additional production (track 5)
- Remi Kabaka Jr. – production (tracks 1–4, 6–15, 17), additional production (track 5)
- James Ford – production (tracks 1–4, 6–16), engineering (tracks 18–19)
- Bizarrap – additional production (track 2), production (track 5)
- Giacomo Vianello – engineering assistance (tracks 1–7, 9–15), engineering (track 8)
- Ishaan Nimkar – engineering assistance (tracks 1–2, 4, 7, 10, 15–19), engineering (track 8)
- Tatool – engineering (track 8)
- Adhithya Sivakumar – engineering assistance (tracks 1–3, 6, 8, 10–11, 14, 16–19), engineering (tracks 9, 12–13, 15)
- Stephen Sedgwick – engineering (track 11)
- Abhishek Sekhri – engineering assistance (track 1, 16–19)
- Shaurya Sarin – engineering assistance (track 1, 16–19)
- Jaspreet Singh – engineering assistance (track 1, 16–19)
- Federica Cottone – engineering assistance (tracks 1–2, 4, 8, 10)
- Trinity Wolfherd – engineering assistance (tracks 2, 5)
- Isaac Allen – engineering assistance (track 2)
- Fabian Perez – engineering assistance (track 5)
- Marta Salogni – mixing (tracks 1–17)
- Heba Kadry – mastering
- Jacob Clements – mastering assistance (tracks 1–7, 9–15)
- Sweety Kapoor – music supervisor

=== Instruments ===
- Bansuri
- Sitar
- Sarod
- Ghungroo
- Tabla
- Dholak
- Conch
- Tanpura
- Bells
- Moog Satellite
- Harmonium
- Wurlitzer
- Piano
- Electric guitar
- Acoustic guitar
- Bass guitar
- Harp
- Tom 1501
- Russian synthesizer
- Juno-106
- Prophet-6
- ARP Quartet
- Sequential Circuits T8
- Mellotron
- Suzuki Omnichord
- Pedal steel guitar
- Korg EK-500
- Korg EK-50
- Yamaha Portasound VSS-100
- Trumpet
- French horn
- Trombone
- Sousaphone
- Euphonium
- Marching drum
- Casio MT-40
- Violin
- Viola
- Cello
- Harmonica
- Spoon
- Timpani
- Elka Artist 707
- Hammond S-100
- Sangat electronic tabla tanpura

=== Artwork ===
- Jamie Hewlett – artwork, design
- Alex Bois – layout

Notes

- ^{^[c]} "The Mountain Choir" consist of Vijayaa Shanker, Rajalakshmee Sanjay, Ritika Sahni, Pari Thakur, Rahul Pandey, Sanskar Vaidya, Vamsee Kotaru, Pulkit Rajvanshi, and Vaishnavi Shanker

== Charts ==
Chart performance for The Mountain
Chart (2026)	Peak position
Australian Albums (ARIA)	4
Austrian Albums (Ö3 Austria)	2
Belgian Albums (Ultratop Flanders)	1
Belgian Albums (Ultratop Wallonia)	2
Canadian Albums (Billboard)	15
Croatian International Albums (HDU)	23
Danish Albums (Hitlisten)	9
Dutch Albums (Album Top 100)	3
Finnish Albums (Suomen virallinen lista)	16
French Albums (SNEP)	4
German Albums (Offizielle Top 100)	2
German Rock & Metal Albums (Offizielle Top 100)	1
Hungarian Albums (MAHASZ)	35
Irish Albums (Official Charts)	1
Irish Independent Albums (IRMA)	1
Italian Albums (FIMI)	12
Japanese Digital Albums (Oricon)	35
Japanese Download Albums (Billboard Japan)	31
Japanese Rock Albums (Oricon)	6
Japanese Western Albums (Oricon)	9
Lithuanian Albums (AGATA)	46
New Zealand Albums (RMNZ)	3
Norwegian Albums (VG-lista)	20
Polish Albums (ZPAV)	2
Portuguese Albums (AFP)	6
Scottish Albums (Official Charts)	2
Spanish Albums (Promusicae)	13
Swedish Albums (Sverigetopplistan)	4
Swiss Albums (Schweizer Hitparade)	1
UK Albums (Official Charts)	1
UK Independent Albums (Official Charts)	1
US Billboard 200	7
US Independent Albums (Billboard)	2
US Indie Store Album Sales (Billboard)	1
US Top Rock & Alternative Albums (Billboard)	1

== Certifications ==
Certifications for The Mountain
Region	Certification	Certified units/sales
United Kingdom (BPI)	Silver	60,000^{‡}
^{‡} Sales+streaming figures based on certification alone.
