= Bholanath Prasanna =

Indian flute or bansuri player

Pandit Bholanath Prasanna
- Born: Varanasi, India
- Genre: Hindustani classical
- Occupation: Flute player
- Instrument: Bansuri

Bholanath Prasanna (1919-1995) was an Indian flute or bansuri player and Guru at AIR at Allahabad. Bholanath Prasanna was a UP Sangeet Natak Akademi Award recipient.

Bansuri Guru Pt. Bholanath Prasanna ji was born in Varanasi. He was disciple of his father Pt. Gauri Shanker.

He taught bansuri to a number of disciples; among them are: Hariprasad Chaurasia, Rajendra Prasanna (nephew), Niranjan Prasad, Ajay Shankar Prasanna (son), and Debopriya and Suchismita Chatterjee.
