= Amjad Ali Khan =

Indian musician

Ustad Amjad Ali Khan
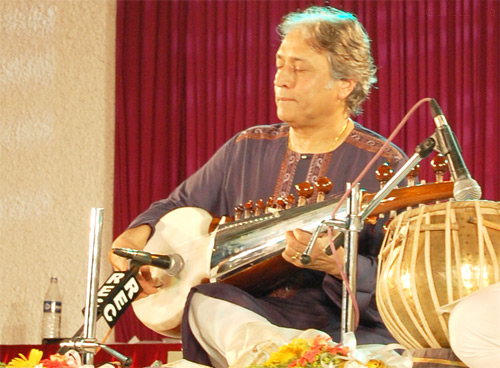
- Khan performing in 2008

Background information
- Born: Masoom Ali Khan; 9 October 1945 (age 81); Gwalior, Gwalior State, British India
- Genre: Hindustani classical music
- Instrument: sarod
- Website: sarod.com

Ustad Amjad Ali Khan (born 9 October 1945) is an Indian classical sarod player, best known for his clear and fast ekhara taans (melodic runs making use of a rapid alternation between upward and downward strokes of the plectrum). Khan was born into a classical musical family (the Bangash lineage of the Senia gharana) and has performed internationally since the 1960s. He was awarded India's second highest civilian honor Padma Vibhushan in 2001, India's third highest civilian honor Padma Bhushan in 1991 and Padma Shree in 1975.

In 2026, Khan won a Grammy Award for Best Audio Book, Narration & Storytelling Recording for the album Meditations: The Reflections of His Holiness The Dalai Lama, a collaboration with the Dalai Lama and his sons, Amaan Ali Bangash and Ayaan Ali Bangash.

== Early life and education ==
Born on 9 October 1945 as Masoom Ali Khan, the youngest of seven children, to Gwalior court musician Hafiz Ali Khan and Rahat Jahan. His family is part of the Bangash (Gwalior) lineage and Khan is in the sixth generation of musicians; his family claims to have invented the sarod. His personal name was changed by a sadhu to Amjad. Khan received homeschooling and studied music under his father who belongs to Gwalior Gharana. In 1957, a cultural organization in Delhi appointed Hafiz Ali Khan as its guest and the family moved to Delhi. Hafiz Ali Khan received training from the descendants of Tansen, the magical musician who was one of the 'Nav-ratna' (nine gems) at the court of the Mughal Emperor Akbar. Thus, Amjad belongs to the lineage of Tansen. Friends of Hafiz Ali Khan convinced him of the importance of formal schooling for his son; as a result, Amjad was taken to meet the Principal of Modern School in New Delhi and admitted there as a day scholar. He attended Modern School from 1958 to 1963.

== Career and recognition ==
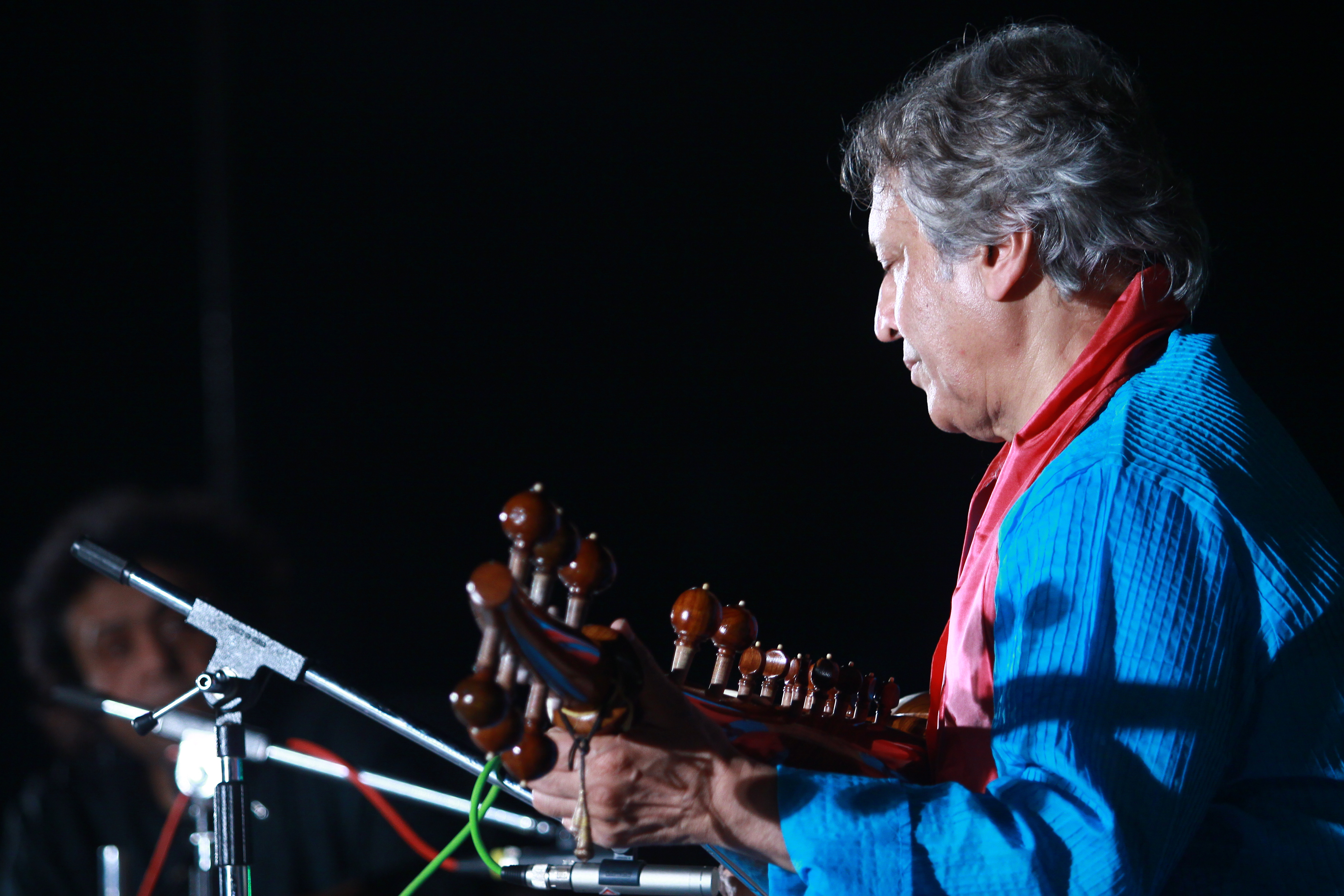
Amjad Ali Khan

Khan first performed in the United States in 1963 and continued into the 2000s, with his sons. He has experimented with modifications to his instrument throughout his career. Khan played with the Hong Kong Philharmonic Orchestra and worked as a visiting professor at the University of New Mexico. In 2011, he performed on Carrie Newcomer's album Everything is Everywhere. In 2014, along with his two sons, Ayaan Ali Khan and Amaan Ali Khan, he performed 'Raga For Peace' in 2014 Nobel Peace Prize Concert.

Khan was awarded 21st Rajiv Gandhi National Sadbhavna Award. Khan received Padma Shri in 1975, Padma Bhushan in 1991, and Padma Vibhushan in 2001, and was awarded the Sangeet Natak Akademi Award for 1989 and the Sangeet Natak Akademi Fellowship for 2011. He was awarded the Fukuoka Asian Culture Prize in 2004. The U.S. state Massachusetts proclaimed 20 April as Amjad Ali Khan Day in 1984. Khan was made an honorary citizen of Houston, Texas, and Nashville, Tennessee, in 1997, and of Tulsa, Oklahoma, in 2007. He received the Banga-Vibhushan in 2011.

== Legacy ==
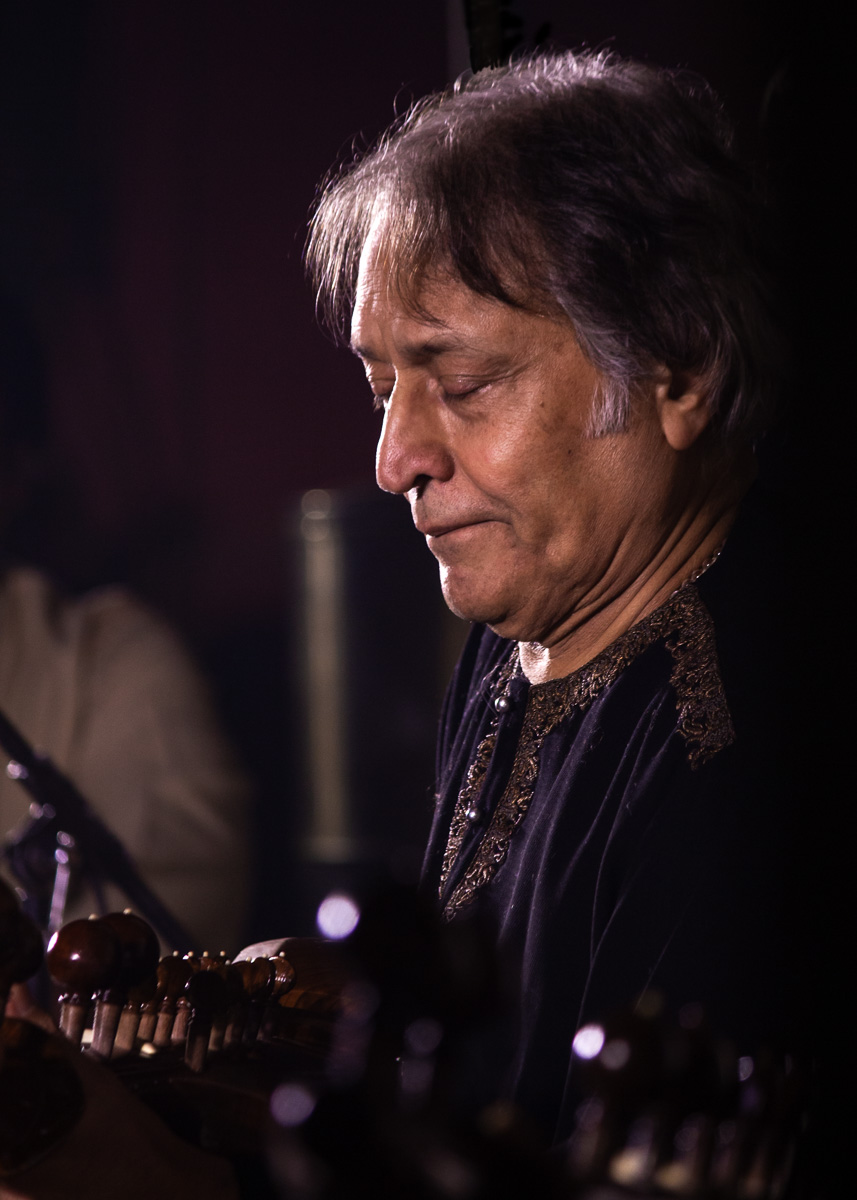
Ustad Amjad Ali Khan performing at the IGNCA, Delhi.

In the 1980s, music critic Mohan Nadkarni described Khan as a "top-notcher" in classical music and among its "celebrities." The Guardian referred to Khan as "one of the last legends of Hindustani classical music."

=== Compositions ===
Khan has introduced many ragas, which he does not acknowledge as "new" or his creations. These include:

- Raga Haripriya Kanada, created in the 1960s as a compound of Raga Charukeshi and Raga Darbari Kanada in honor of Swami Haridas.
- Raga Kiranranjani, created in the 1960s
- Raga Amiri Todi, created in 1974 as a compound of Raga Shahana Kanada and Raga Bilaskhani Todi due to Ustad Amir Khan's death.
- Raga Lalita Dhwani, created in 1976
- Raga Shyam Shri, created in 1980 as a compound of Raga Yaman in the purvang and Raga Shree in the uttarang.
- Raga Saraswati Kalyan, created in 1980
- Raga Priyadarshini, created in 1984 due to Indira Gandhi's assassination
- Raga Shivanjali, created in 1987
- Raga Shantana, created in 1990
- Raga Mangresh, created in 1990 after Deenanath Mangeshkar's rendition of the Marathi natya sangeet, "Prem Seva Sharan" from Sangeet Manapman.
- Raga Jawahar Manjari, created in 1990 after Jawaharlal Nehru.
- Raga Kamalshree, created in 1991
- Raga Ganesh Kalyan, created in 1992
- Raga Subhalakshmi, created in 1995
- Raga Aahuti, created in 1996
- Raga Haafiz Kauns, created in 1997 to honor Khan's father and guru, Hafiz Ali Khan.
- Raga Rahat Kauns, created in 1997 to honor Khan's mother, Rahat Jahan.
- Raga Shyama Gauri, created in 1999
- Raga Saawan Malhar, created in 2008
- Raga Atal Manjari, created in 2018 due to Atal Bihari Vajpayee's death.

=== Students ===
Khan's foremost disciples are his two sons, Amaan Ali Bangash and Ayaan Ali Bangash. In the early 60s, one of Khan's first and most senior students was Gurdev Singh.

== Playing style ==
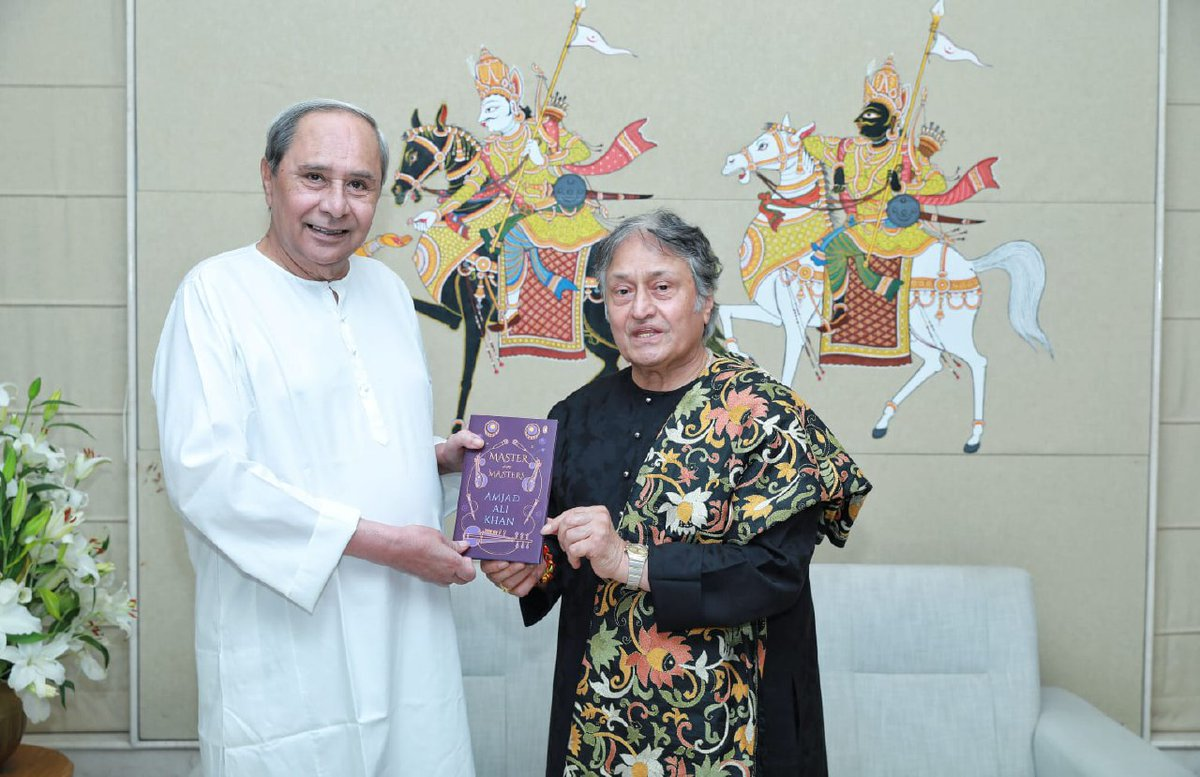
Amjad Ali Khan with Odisha CM Naveen Pattnaik

Critics have praised the technical brilliance and emotional expressiveness of Khan's playing. He specializes in the ekhara taan of sarod.

== Media appearances ==
Ustad Amjad Ali Khan (1990), a Gulzar directed Indian documentary film on Amjad Ali Khan won the Filmfare Award for Best Documentary in 1990.

== Personal life ==
On 25 September 1976, Khan got married a second time. His bride was Bharatanatyam dancer Subhalakshmi Barooah, hailing from Assam in north-eastern India. They have two sons, Amaan and Ayaan, both of whom are performing artists trained in music by their father.

Khan cared for his diabetic father until he died in 1972. Their family home in Gwalior was made into a musical center and they live in New Delhi.

== Discography ==
- The Maestro's Musings (LP) (1986, CBS)
- Swar Sameer (1991, Super Cassettes Industries Ltd., T-Series)
- Serene Strings (1994, EMI, RPG Enterprises)
- North India: Instrumental Music of Medieval India (1994, Ocora)
- Ragas Bilaskhani Todi & Brindabani Sarang (1994, Navras Records)
- The Rough Guide to the Music of India and Pakistan (1996, World Music Network) (contributing artist)
- Sarod Maestro Amjad Ali Khan with sons Amaan Ali Bangash & Ayaan Ali Bangash (2001, Chhanda Dhara)
- Music from the 13th Century (2005, Navras Records)
- Moksha (2005, Real World Records)
- Confluence (2005, Navras Records) (jugalbandi with singer Girija Devi)
- My Inspirations (2006, Navras Records)
- Romancing The Rains (2007, Navras Records)
- Samaagam (2011, World Village) (with the Scottish Chamber Orchestra)
- Masterworks From The NCPA Archives (2012, Navras Records)
- Raga Bahar (2015, Sony music)
- ‘’ Meditations: The Reflections of His Holiness The Dalai Lama’’ (2026, Glassnote Music, LLC)

== Awards and recognition ==
- 1975: Padma Shri, Government of India
- 1978-9: Sahitya Kala Parishad Samman
- 1989: Sangeet Natak Akademi Award, Sangeet Natak Akademi
- 1991: Padma Bhushan, Government of India
- 1997: Crystal Award, World Economic Forum
- 2001: Padma Vibhushan, Government of India
- 2010: Grammy_Award_for_Best_Traditional_World_Music_Album for Ancient Sounds with Rahim Alhaj
- 2010: Vivekananda National Award for Lifetime Achievement from the Indian Ministry of Information and Broadcasting
- 2010: Honorary Doctorate, Mangalayatan University
- 2010: Honorary Doctorate in Literature, North Bengal University
- 2011: Sangeet Natak Akademi Fellowship, Sangeet Natak Akademi
- 2011: Banga Bibhushan, Government of West Bengal
- 2012: Gulab Khan Award, Kingdom of Marwar Gaj Singh
- 2012: Honorary Doctorate in Literature, Jadavpur University
- 2012: Prem Nazir International Award, Dammam
- 2012: Lifetime Achievement Award, Delhi Government
- 2012: Rajiv Gandhi Sadbhavna Award
- 2015: Alva Virasat, Alva's Educational Foundation
- 2015: Swati Puraskar, Kerala Government
- 2016: Honorary Doctorate in Literature, Indira Kala Sangeet Vishwavidyalaya
- 2017: Gold Medal, Global Music Awards
- 2018: Ram Award for Lifetime Achievement, Shriram Bharatiya Kala Kendra
- 2026: Grammy Award for Best Audio Book, Narration & Storytelling Recording- with the Dalai Lama
