= Edenderry =

Town in County Offaly, Ireland

Edenderry Éadan Doire
- Town
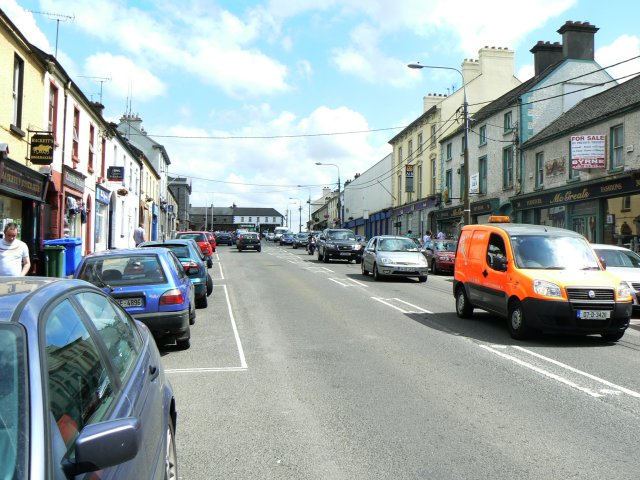
- JKL Street in Edenderry is named for James Warren Doyle (a.k.a. James Kildare & Leighlin)

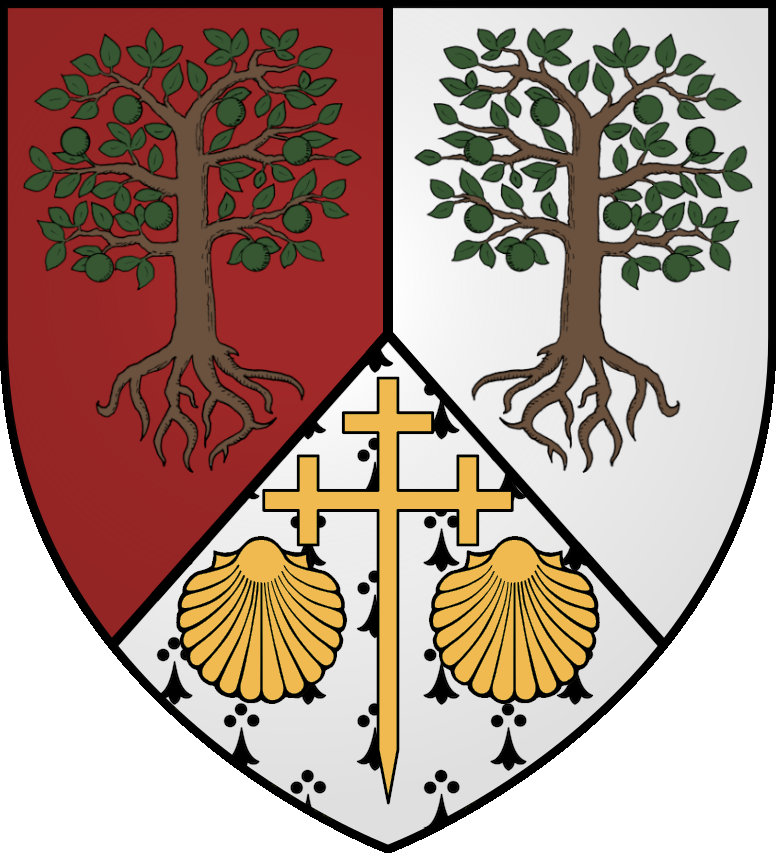
- Coat of arms
- Motto: Esto Fideles - The Faithful
- Location in Ireland
- Coordinates: 53.345°N 7.05116°W
- Country: Ireland
- Province: Leinster
- County: County Offaly
- Elevation: 84 m (276 ft)

Population (2022)
  - Total: 7,888
- Time zone: UTC±0 (WET)
  - Summer (DST): UTC+1 (IST)
- Eircode: R45
- Telephone area code: 046
- Irish Grid Reference: N633328

Historical population
Year	Pop.	±%
1831	1,283	—
1841	1,850	+44.2%
1851	1,804	−2.5%
1861	1,661	−7.9%
1871	1,873	+12.8%
1881	1,555	−17.0%
1891	1,577	+1.4%
1901	1,611	+2.2%
1911	2,208	+37.1%
1926	2,092	−5.3%
1936	2,093	+0.0%
1946	2,996	+43.1%
1951	2,596	−13.4%
1956	2,729	+5.1%
1961	2,794	+2.4%
1966	2,902	+3.9%
1971	3,116	+7.4%
1981	3,666	+17.7%
1986	3,753	+2.4%
1991	3,940	+5.0%
1996	3,825	−2.9%
2002	4,559	+19.2%
2006	5,818	+27.6%
2011	6,490	+11.6%
2016	7,359	+13.4%
2022	7,888	+7.2%

Edenderry (/ˌiːdənˈdɛri/; Irish: Éadan Doire, meaning 'hill-brow of the oak wood') is a town in eastern County Offaly, Ireland. 55 km west of Dublin city centre, it is near the borders with Counties Kildare, Meath and Westmeath. The Grand Canal runs along the south of Edenderry, through the Bog of Allen, and there is a short spur to the town centre.

The R401 road from Kinnegad to the north and the R402 from Enfield to the east meet at the northeastern end of the Main Street. At the Grand Canal they split, with the R402 continuing westwards towards Tullamore and the R401 heads south to Rathangan and Kildare Town.

== History ==
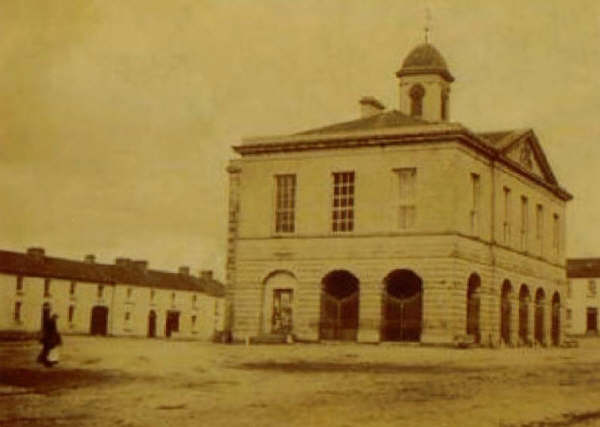
Edenderry Town Hall

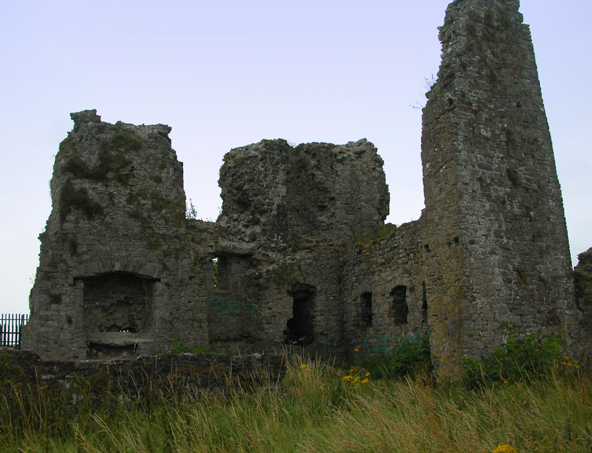
Blundell Castle Ruins

In the 16th century, Edenderry was known as Coolestown, after the family of Cooley or Cowley, who had a castle here. It was defended in 1599 against the Confederates, during the Nine Years' War. This subsequently passed by marriage to the Blundell family and was sacked in 1691 by the army of James II.

The Blundells' land passed subsequently to the Marquess of Downshire, who reversed the earlier opposition of the Blundell sisters to the establishment of a branch to the Grand Canal to Edenderry and paid for the £692 cost of the project, which was completed in 1802.

By 1716 the manufacture of woollen cloth was thriving, first established by Quakers, which employed around 1,000 people. By 1911 the town had grown to 2,204 people. Other industries included the factory of Daniel Alesbury, who made a variety of woodwork as well as the first car manufactured in Ireland, the Alesbury, in 1907. Edenderry Town Hall was completed in 1830.

== Demographics ==
The population of Edenderry doubled in the period between the census of 1996 (when it had a population of 3,825 people) and the 2022 census (which recorded a population of 7,888 people).

== Education ==
There are two secondary schools in the town, St. Mary's Secondary School and Oaklands Community College, as well as five primaries, Gaelscoil Éadan Doire, St. Mary's Primary School, Scoil Bhríde Primary School, Saint Patrick's Primary School, and Monasteroris National School. There is also a Youthreach centre, for students aged 15 and older.

== Local organisations ==
Organisations and businesses operating in the area include the Offaly Express newspaper, Edenderry Chamber of Commerce and Eden FM Community Radio

Local sports clubs include Edenderry Rugby Club, Edenderry GAA club, Edenderry Town AFC, and Highfield Golf Club.

== Notable people ==
- Neil Delamere, comedian
- Frantic Jack, rock band
- Liam Lawton, international composer and singer, involved with St Mary's Church
- Josef Locke (1917–1999), tenor, lived in Edenderry

== See also ==
- List of towns and villages in Ireland
