= Gurdev Singh (musician) =

Indian-born musician based in London (1948-2025)

- Born: January 15, 1948; India
- Died: February 10, 2025 (aged 77)
- Genres: Hindustani classical music
- Instrument: sarod
- Website: Official website

Gurdev Singh (15 January 1948 - 10 Feb 2025) was an Indian-born musician based in London who played the plucked string instrument sarod. Singh studied under sarod player Amjad Ali Khan, could play the instrument dilruba, and also sung Hindustani classical music. He performed on the 1993 album Fate of Nations by English rock singer Robert Plant. Singh has played internationally and taught students in England.

Gurdev Singh performed extensively during the 80s and 90s. He taught Dilruba and Sarod to over 1000 students globally. One of his most senior students is Gurbaksh Matharu.
