= Ajay Prasanna =

Indian flute or bansuri player

- Born: Ajay Shankar Prasanna; 1969 (age 56–57); Allahabad
- Origin: allahabad
- Genre: Hindustani classical
- Occupation: Flute player
- Instrument: Bansuri

Ajay Shankar Prasanna (born 1969) is a famous Indian classical musician, flutist, belonging to the Banaras (Varanasi) Gharana of the Hindustani bansuri (bamboo flute) tradition. Born in Allahabad (now Prayagraj), state of Uttar Pradesh, to an illustrious family of classical musicians, he grew up surrounded by the world of North Indian classical music. The renowned bansuri master and scholar of Indian classical music, his father and guru Pandit Bholanath Prasanna, who was the guru of Pandit Hariprasad Chaurasia, gave him very strict training in the guru shishya parampara.³ Together with his father, Ajay Shankar Prasanna got tutelage from other accomplished members of the family, and learned the unique features of the Banaras gharana, characterized by gayaki ang (vocalization), lyrical alaap, and layakari (rhythm).

== Early life and training ==
Ajay Prasanna learned how to play the flute from his father, Bholanath Prasanna, a bansuri maestro from the Banaras Gharana. Ajay made his public debut at six years old, performing at the Akhil Bharatiya Sangeet Sammelan. He is known for his command of both the gaayaki and tantrakaari styles of flute playing, blending traditional technique with a distinctive modern sensibility

== Career And Awards ==
Ajay Prasanna Prasanna has had performances in India and abroad. He has performed at venues such as Queen Elizabeth Hall in London and participated in international music events. He was a guest artist on the 2026 Gorillaz album The Mountain alongside several other Indian musicians. Ajay Prasanna has been recognized with several honors, including Grammy nominations, the Global Indian Music Award (GIMA) for his album Cinema, the Sangeet Ratna Award from Swami Haridas Samiti, and the Surmani Award from Sur Singar Sansad.

- AIR top grade artist
- Five-time Grammy Award nominee
- Global Indian Music Award (GIMA) for Best Fusion Album, for the album 'Cinema'
- Sangeet Ratna Award, Swami Haridas Samiti, Vrindavan
- Surmani Award, Sur Singar Sansad / Surshringar Sansad, Mumbai
- Bharat Gaurav Samman, Orissa Academy of Tribal Culture Research & Performing Arts
- Bharat Gaurav Samman (2016)
- Shri Chandrakeshwar Sangeet Samaroh – Prashasti Patra
- Pracheen Kala Kendra – Token of Appreciation (2019)
- Sangeet Samman (Akhil Bharatiya Sangeet Sammelan, Vrindavan)
