= Niranjan Prasad =

Indian flutist

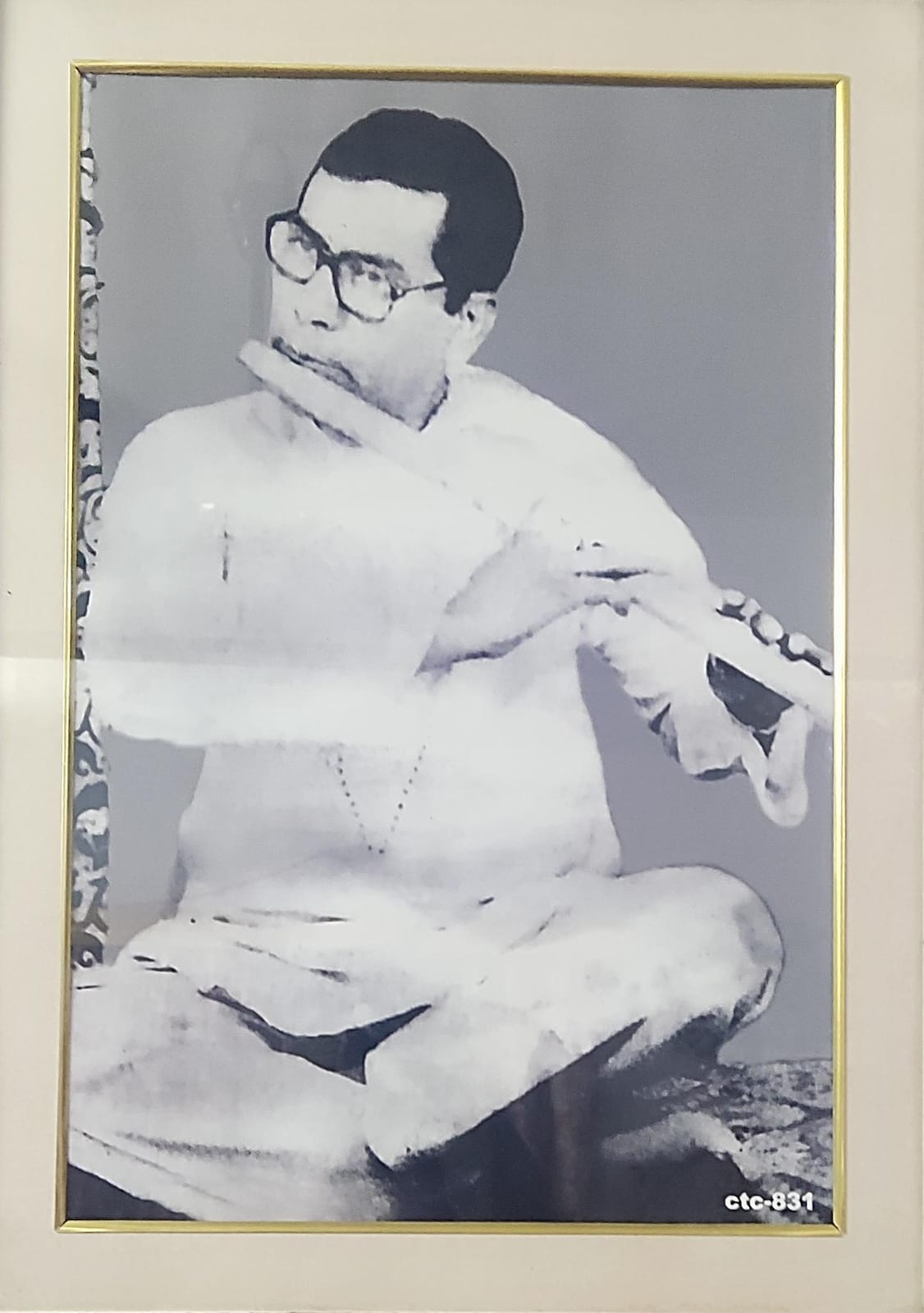
- Pandit Niranjan Prasad

Background information
- Born: 11 November 1941; Allahabad, Uttar Pradesh, India
- Died: 31 March 2013 (aged 71)
- Genres: Hindustani classical music
- Occupations: Flutist, Musician, Music Director, Professor
- Instruments: Flute, Bansuri
- Years active: 1959–2013

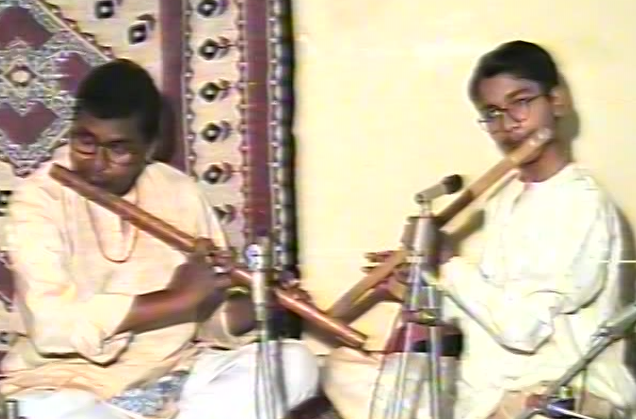
Prasad with his son Saurabh Banaudha

Niranjan Prasad (11 November 1941 – 31 March 2013) was an Indian flutist.

== Career ==
Prasad was a disciple of bansuri and shehnai player Bholanath Prasanna, and belonged to the Banaras gharana.

Prasad played the flute in Indian films and as part of various orchestral organizations. From 1974 he was associated with National Orchestra A.I.R. New Delhi and A.I.R. Lucknow. He retired in 2001.

He was the founder of Dr. Ambedkar Sangeet Academy (Lucknow) and Ex-Professor N. R. Sangeet Vidhalaya (Allahabad). The music museum of Baghdad has a flute gifted by him to the institute.

His work was featured in the Bollywood Movies Guddi, Shor, Dharkan and Prem Parvat.

He was an empaneled artist of ICCR.

On the first anniversary of Prasad's death in 2014, "Niranjan Smriti", a tribute was organized at the Sangeet Natak Akademi in Lucknow. His book on music, "Sadhna Ke Phool", was released at the event. Yamini Krishnamurthy, an Indian dancer, performed with her group. Other performances included flute recitals by Shri Saurabh Banaudha (Prasad's son) and Shri Rajshekhar Dalbehera.
