= Debopriya and Suchismita Chatterjee =

Indian musicians

Debopriya Chatterjee and Suchismita Chatterjee
- Born: Allahabad, India
- Genres: Hindustani classical music
- Occupation: Flautists
- Instrument: Indian Flute or Bansuri
- Years active: 1998
- Website: http://www.flutesisters.com

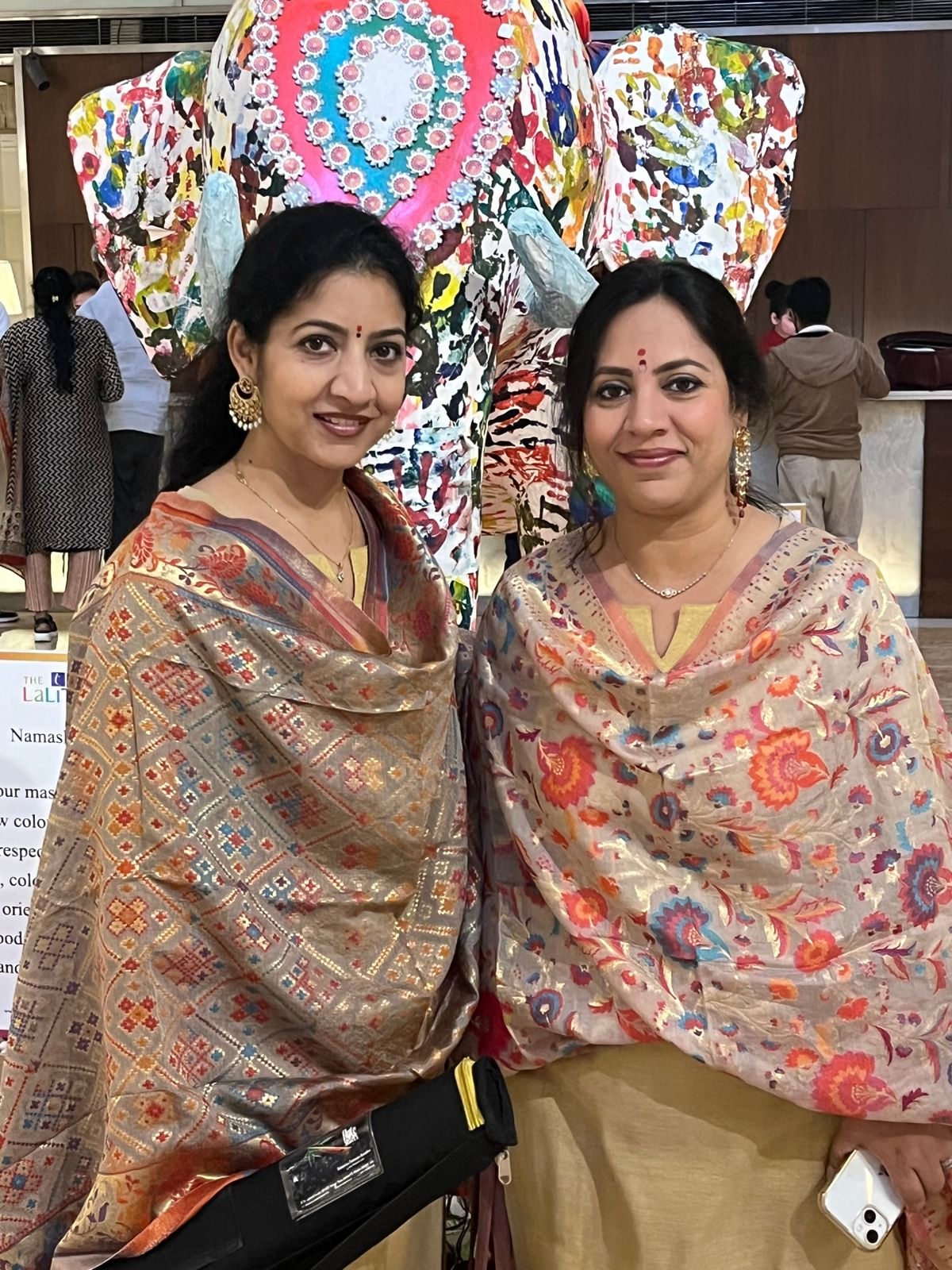
Debopriya Chatterjee and Suchismita Chatterjee

Debopriya Chatterjee and Suchismita Chatterjee are sisters by birth, popularly known as the "flute sisters". They are Indian Hindustani music artists who play instrumental Indian flute music.

== Early life ==
Born into a well-known family of musicians in Allahabad, the Chatterjee sisters were prompted to learn flute by their parents Robin and Krishna Chatterjee, who were classical Hindustani vocalists. Robin, whose work led the family to live in Afghanistan for a time, suggested to his daughters that they become flautists, to fulfill a dream he had never been able to live up to. After returning to India, the sisters began their flute training under the tutelage of Pandit Bholanath Prasanna. In their teenage years, they began studying with flautist guru Pandit Hariprasad Chaurasia.

After completing their basic education, the sisters were awarded the Nuffic scholarship from the Indian Embassy in The Netherlands. They studied world music at the Rotterdam Conservatory, earning a certification with distinction for Uitvoerend Musicus (Performing Musician) and Docenten Musicus (Music Teacher) in 1998. Returning to India, they then completed a Sangeet Prabhakar (bachelor of music degree) from Prayag Sangeet Samiti in Allahabad in 2001. They were honoured with the performance medals for flute, with Suchismita getting the gold and Debopriya earning the silver medal. They continued at Prayag Sangeet Samiti, earning a Sangeet Pravin (master's degree of music) in 2005 with their medal positions reversed—Debopriya received gold and Suchismita, silver.

They are both married and have children. While Suchismita lives in Pune, Debopriya makes her home in Mumbai.

== Career ==
In 1995, the sisters debuted in Bombay at the Sampoorna Yugal Sangeet Ratri music conference. The program was telecast and earned them recognition for their performance of Indian classical music on the bansuri. They have played as a duo and were also accompanied their guru, performing flute concerts not only in India but abroad as well. They continued to win accolades from various public platforms where they performed. The sisters have also provided background music for TV serials such as Afsar Bitiya, Balika Vadhu and Crime Patrol. They believe that playing as a duo, known in Indian classical music as jugalbandi, is an advantage on the flute, as the instrument cannot be tuned, forcing the artist to adjust to the instrument. They consider their skills to be complementary, as they claim to have different strengths.

As of 2016, the sisters are in their mid-thirties and enjoy a reputation as popular female flautists in India. Concerning this, Suchismita says: "I think it is due to a lack of prominent women flautists that girls these days don't think of it as an instrument to be played by women... We had no woman role model when we were growing up. One of the things we can do to change that is teach other children ourselves". To that end, the sisters have worked with several organisations, like the Society for the Promotion of Indian Classical Music and Culture Amongst Youth, to give interactive performances for students in order for them to learn about India's musical heritage. In January 2014, the sisters gave a presentation combining talk and musical demonstrations at a cultural programme organized by the Symbiosis Institute of Mass Communications of Pune. They consider the flute to be "a full-fledged member of the Indian classical music family". The sisters hold that at its root, the flute is a folk instrument with a history embedded by legends of the Mahabharata period when Krishna wooed gopis with his bansuri or flute.

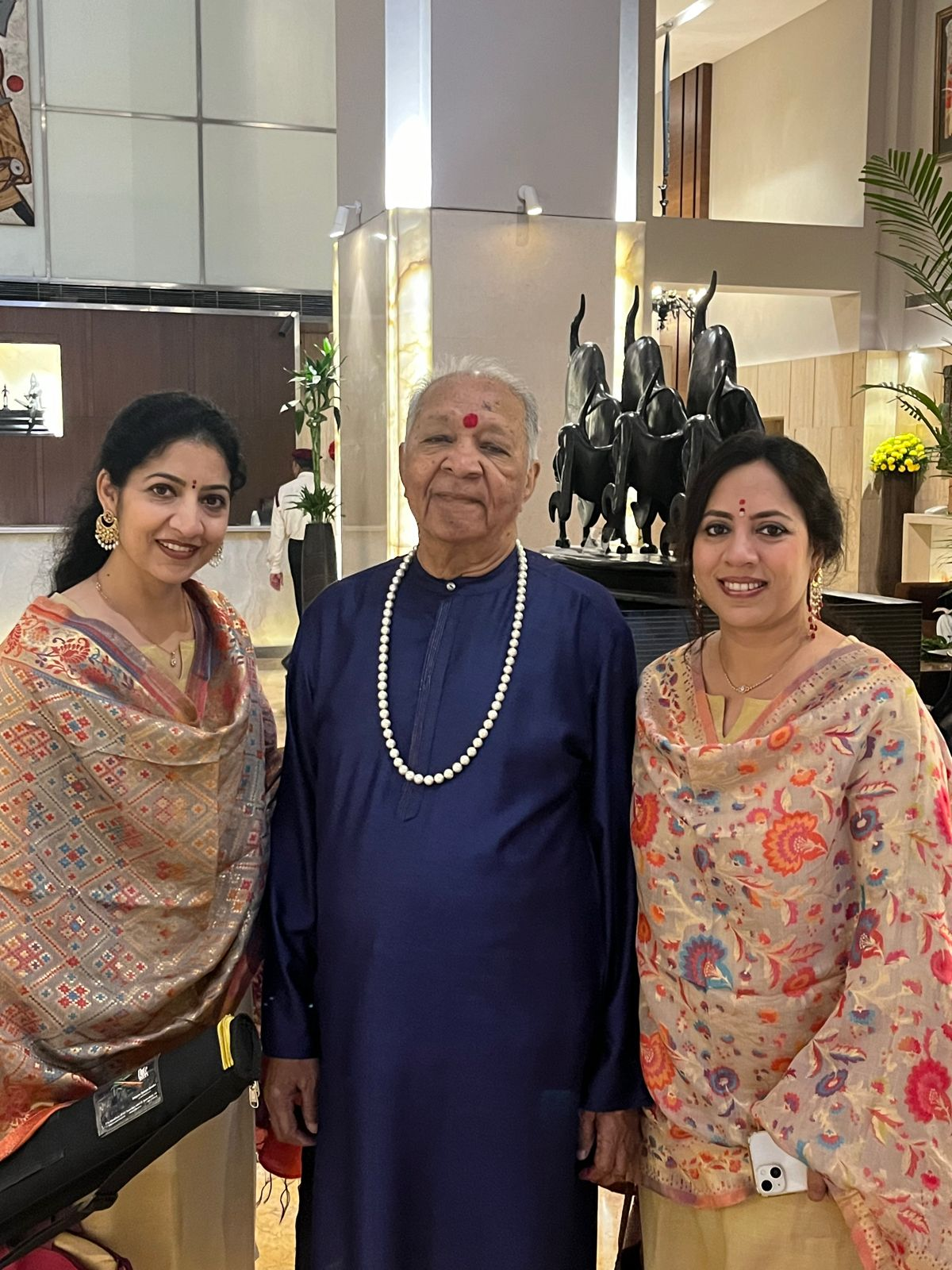
Suchismita and Debopriya Chatterjee with their guru Padmvibhushan Pt. Hariprasad Chaurasia.

Debopriya Chatterjee received a Sangeet Natak Academy award in the Hindustani Instrumental category as a flute artist from the Ustad Bismillah Khan Yuva Puraskar (Prize to Young Artists) in 2008. Both are graded artists of Aakashwani. They were honored as Sur Mani at the Kal Ke Kalakar conference in 2001. They have also been featured performers at Swami Haridas Sangeet Sammelan, a noted Indian classical music conference.

In November 2021, Debopriya and Suchismita Chatterjee were conferred upon the prestigious Rashtriya Pandit Kumar Gandharva Samman (2019-20) instituted by the government of Madhya Pradesh for their outstanding contribution to the Indian classical music.
