= Edenderry Town Hall =

Municipal building in Edenderry, County Offaly, Ireland

- Halla an Bhaile Éadan Doire
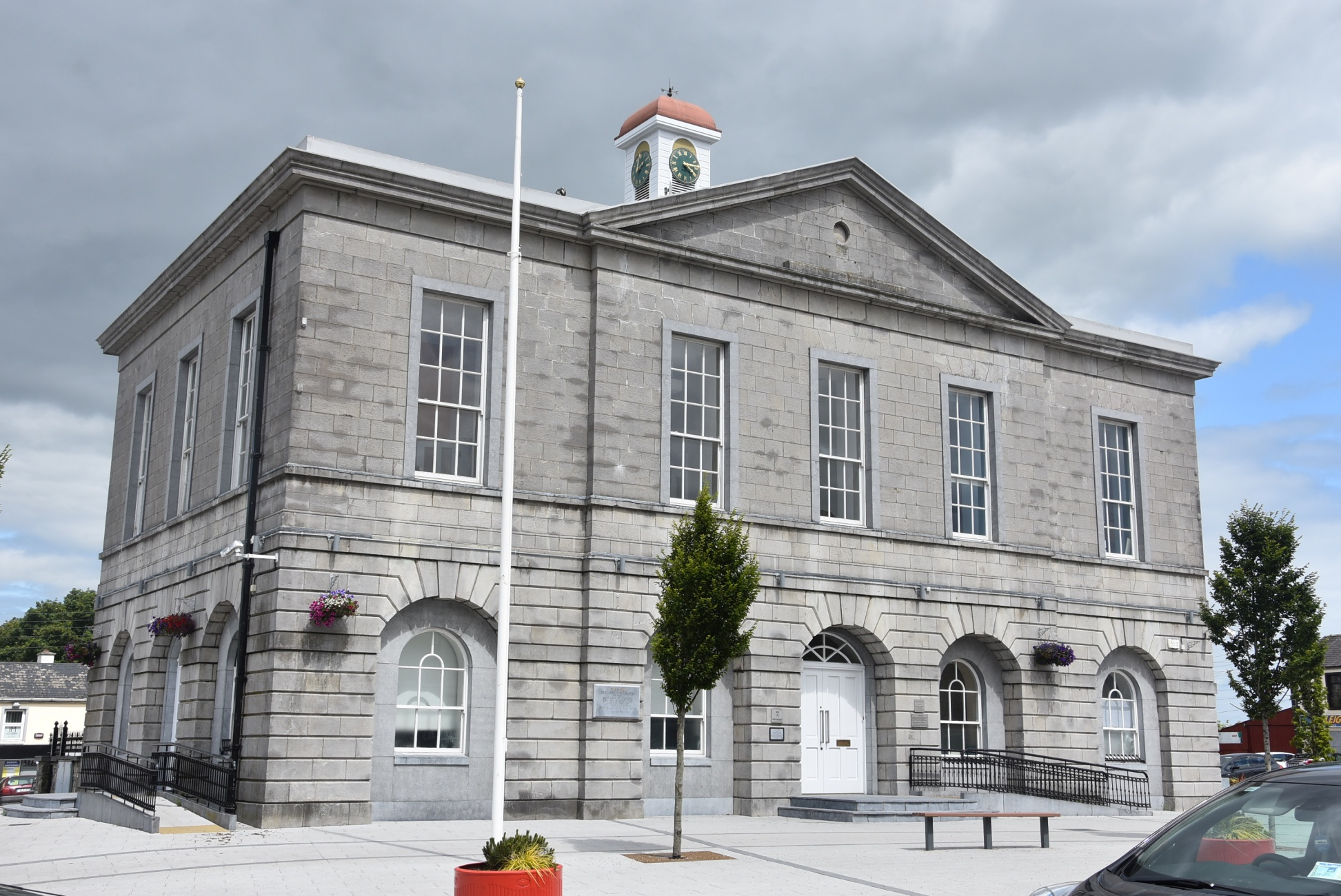
- Edenderry Town Hall

- Location within Ireland

General information
- Architectural style: Neoclassical style
- Location: JKL Street, Edenderry, Ireland
- Coordinates: 53.3433°N 7.0490°W
- Completed: 1830

Design and construction
- Architect: Thomas Duff

Edenderry Town Hall (Irish: Halla an Bhaile Éadan Doire) is a former municipal building on JKL Street in Edenderry, County Offaly, Ireland. It now operates as a business centre.

== History ==
The building was commissioned as a market house by the local landowner, Arthur Hill, 3rd Marquess of Downshire, who held the Downshire Estate at Edenderry, and who was responsible for the development of the town in the early 19th century, erecting extensive new housing and several schools.

The building was designed by Thomas Duff in the neoclassical style, built in ashlar stone at a cost of £5,000 and was completed in 1830. The design involved a symmetrical main frontage of five bays facing onto JKL Street (named after James Warren Doyle who as Bishop of Kildare and Leighlin signed documents JLK, an acronym for "James Kildare and Leighlin"). The building, which was rusticated on the ground floor, featured five openings with voussoirs and keystones on ground floor and five sash windows with architraves on the first floor. The central section of three bays, which was slightly projected forward, was surmounted by a pediment. At roof level, there was a small clock tower with an ogee-shaped dome. Internally, the principal rooms were the market hall on the ground floor, and an assembly room on the first floor.

In March 1849, during the Great Famine, the local poor law guardians held a meeting in the town hall at which they expressed sympathy with poor people who were starving in the south and west of Ireland and petitioned the UK Government not to impose a tax, based on ratable value, on properties in Ireland. In 1939, the building was renamed "Father Paul Murphy Hall", in honour of Father Paul Murphy, who had been the local parish priest from 1910 to 1933.

The building was damaged by a fire in 1945 and restored to its original form at a cost of £15,000 in 1951. The building became an important community events venue. During the 1950s, Edenderry Rugby Football Club held an annual dance in the assembly hall to raise funds for the club, and, in the 1960s, the pop singer, Joe Dolan, regularly performed in concerts arranged by Seamus Casey there. The ground floor was subsequently used by the local council as offices for the delivery of local services, while the assembly room on the first floor was used as a courthouse until 2013. The building now operates as a business centre.
