= Frantic Jack =

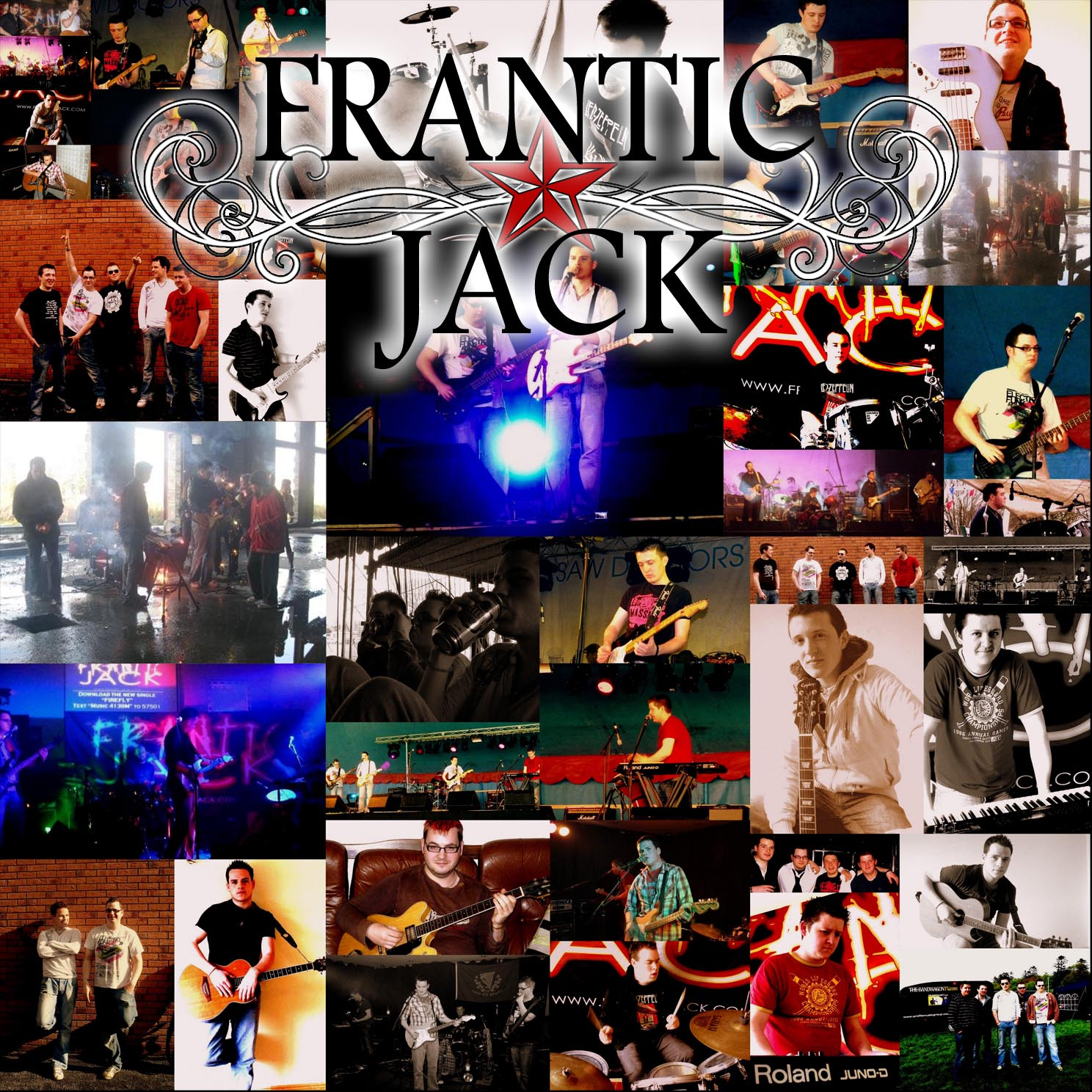

Background information
- Origin: Edenderry, County Offaly, Ireland
- Genres: Acoustic; Rock
- Years active: 2009–present
- Label: Unsigned
- Members: Daragh Fitzgerald; James Kearney; Pauric Hurst; Mark Kelly; Ricky Byrne
- Past members: Mark Duffy, Michael Holton
- Website: FranticJack.com

Frantic Jack are an Irish rock band formed in Edenderry, County Offaly. Since its creation, the band's line-up has included Daragh Fitzgerald (vocals), Mark Kelly (guitar), Pauric Hurst (bass), and James Kearney (keys). The band's current drummer is Ricky Byrne, who has been with the band since April 2012.

== Formation ==
After the breakup of various local bands the band met in January 2009 to discuss the formation of a new Original group. Originally a 3-piece including Daragh Fitzgerald, James Kearney and Pauric Hurst the band recruited their first permanent drummer Mark Duffy who recorded on the band's debut E.P "Frantic Jack". Following the E.P Duffy left the band and was replaced by numerous temporary drummers before installing Michael Holton full-time. Holton remained with the band throughout the recording of the band's first album "Independence" and was with the band for more than two and a half years. In April 2012 Holton informed the band of his decision to leave before the recording of the second album and was replaced by former "Seven Days" drummer Ricky Byrne who is now with the band and has recorded on their new album Last One To Leave due for release 3 August 2012.

== Independence 2010–2012 ==
The band's debut album Independence received high praise from popular music magazine Hot Press amongst others, and was tipped as one of the best Irish records of 2010. The album boasts two Top 20 singles in "Firefly" (which was also 2fm's single of the week) and "Free" as well as the band's first Top 10 single "Hold On", which charted at No. 9 on first week of release and remained there for three weeks.

To date Frantic Jack have played in some of the country's biggest venues, and following performances in the Olympia Theatre, The RDS, Whelan's and The Village their live shows have become known for being highly energetic, tight and entertaining. Along the way they have performed on the same bill as The Saw Doctors, Ash, Delorentos, Duke Special, Imelda May, Bressie, The Undertones and many more.

Independence was written and named after the band's two years as an unsigned group and was also entirely released and funded independently. All three of the singles which charted did so as the only independent songs in the Irish Top 50 of their release week.

On 20 November 2010 it was announced on the band's official website, that a second album was being written for commercial release sometime in 2012, and would be the first album recorded entirely with the band's current line up.

== Last One To Leave 2012–present ==
The band announced that they were releasing their second album entitled Last One To Leave on 3 August 2012. This would be followed by an Irish and international tour.

== Band members ==
- Daragh Fitzgerald - Rhythm Guitar & Lead Vocals
- Mark Kelly - Lead Guitar
- Pauric Hurst - Bass
- James Kearney Keyboard
- Ricky Byrne - Drums

== Discography ==
=== Albums ===
- Independence (Album, July 2012)

No.	Title	Length
1.	"Hold On"	3:47
2.	"Vancouver"	2:54
3.	"Firefly"	3:25
4.	"Fallen Heroes"	5:26
5.	"Rise Above"	3:54
6.	"Writing On The Wall"	3:28
7.	"Free"	3:25
8.	"Hang From The Gates"	4:34
9.	"Old Coyote"	4:12
10.	"Set Ablaze"	4:12
11.	"Rallying Cry"	6:17
12.	"Rely On You"	4:45

=== Singles ===
Year	Title	Chart positions	Album
Year	Title	IRL	Album
2009	"Firefly"	23	Independence
2009	"Free"	20	Independence
2010	"Hold On"	9	Independence
2011	"Fallen Heroes"	—	Independence
"—" denotes a title that did not chart.

=== EPs ===
- "Frantic Jack EP" (EP, September 2009)

Tracklist

No.	Title	Length
1.	"Set Ablaze"	4:12
2.	"Careless"	3:36
3.	"Vancouver"	2:54
4.	"Hang From The Gates"	4:32
5.	"Free"	3:28
