= Amaan Ali Bangash =

Indian classical musician (born 1977)

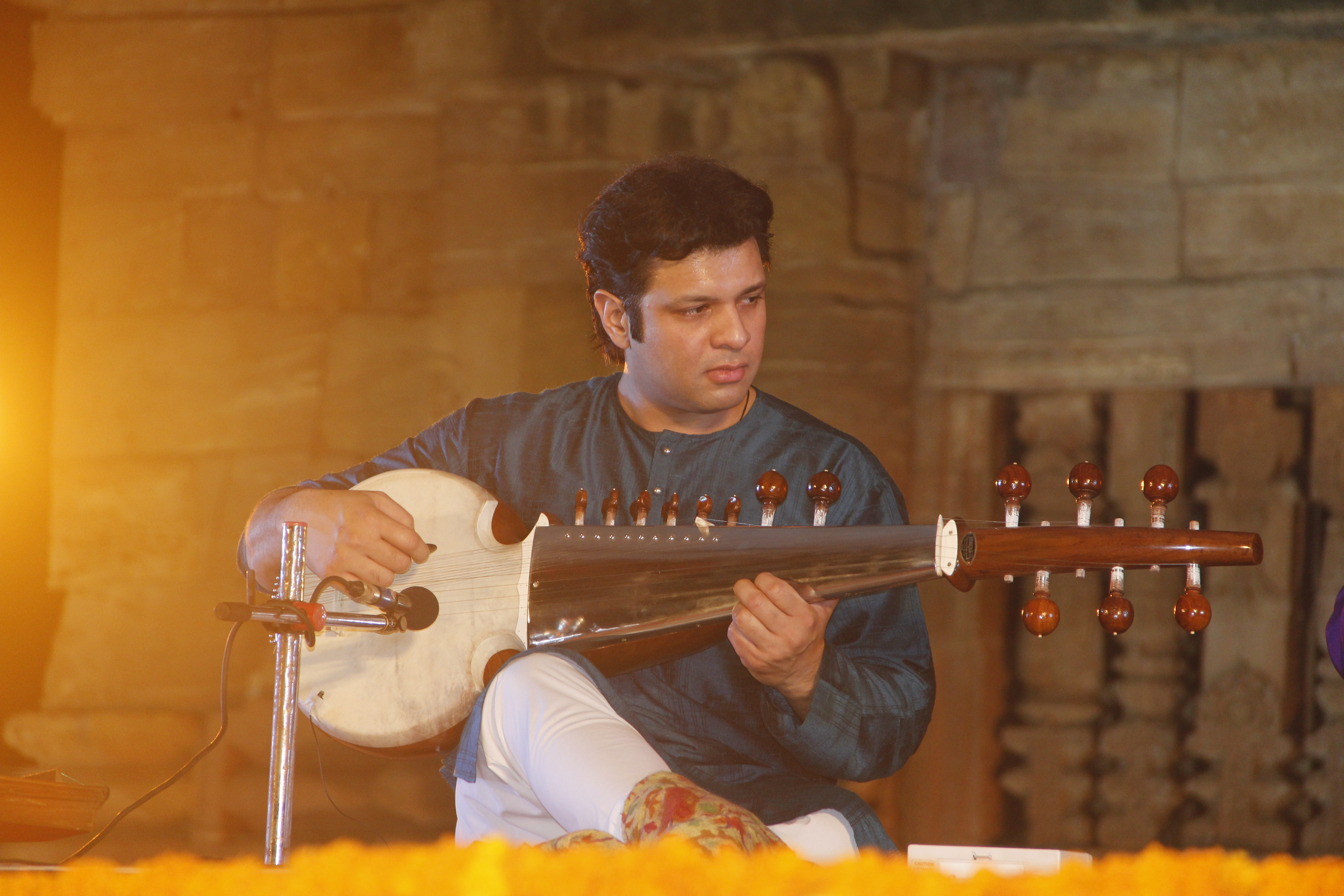
- Rajarani Music Fest, 2016

Background information
- Also known as: Amaan Ali Khan
- Born: 12 July 1977 (age 48)
- Origin: Delhi, India
- Genres: Hindustani classical music, world fusion music
- Instrument: sarod
- Website: Official website

Amaan Ali Bangash (born 1977) is an Indian classical musician who plays the sarod. He is the son of Amjad Ali Khan and often performs with his younger brother Ayaan Ali Bangash, with whom he hosted the music talent show Sa Re Ga Ma Pa. In 2024 he performed solo for Darbar Festival at the Barbican Centre.

In 2026, Bangash won a Grammy Award for Best Audio Book, Narration & Storytelling Recording for the album Meditations: The Reflections of His Holiness The Dalai Lama, a collaboration with the Dalai Lama, his father, Amjad Ali Khan, and his brother, Ayaan Ali Bangash.
