= Ayaan Ali Bangash =

Indian classical musician (born 1979)

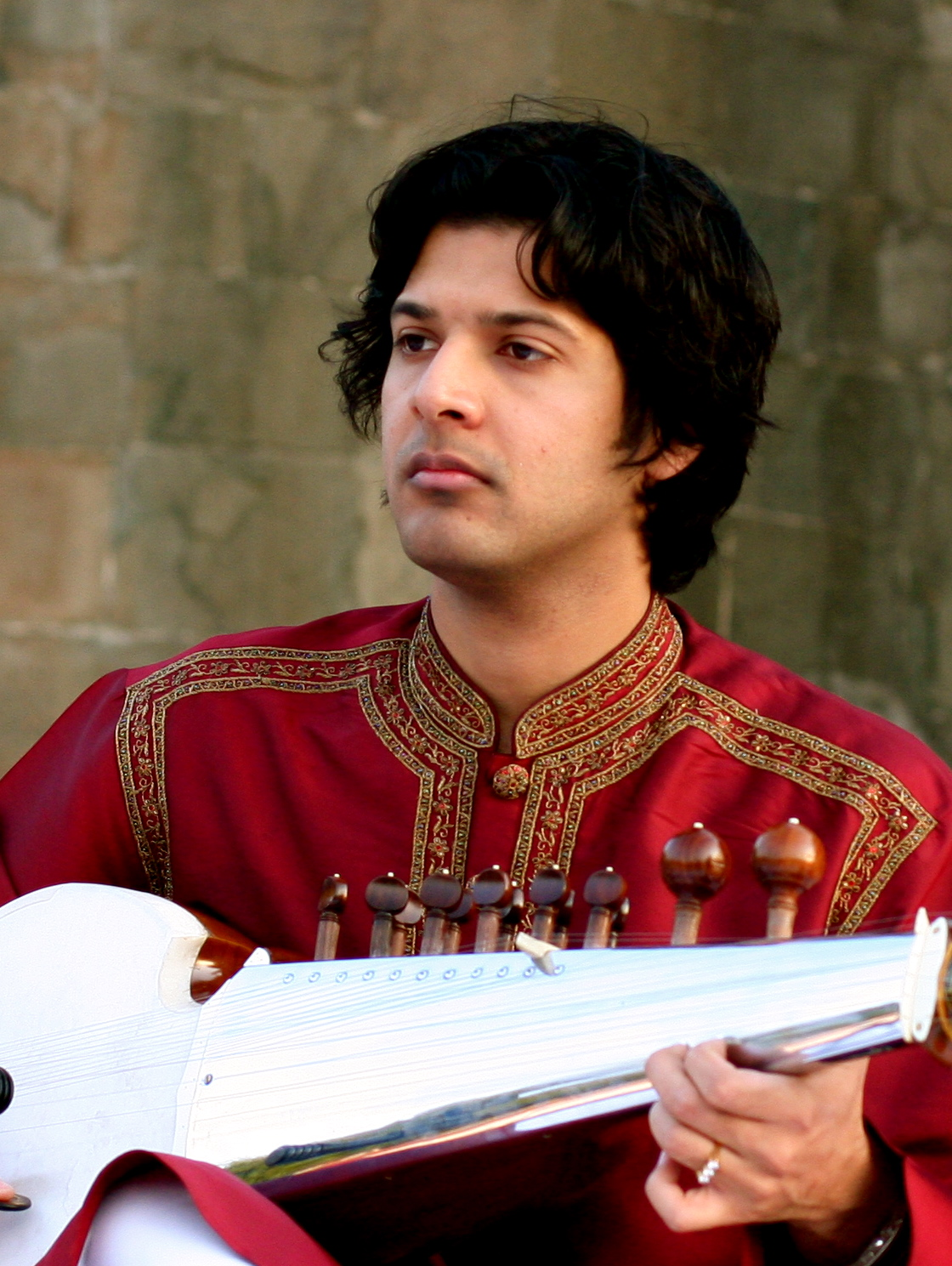

Background information
- Also known as: Ayaan Ali Khan
- Born: 5 September 1979 (age 47)
- Origin: Gwalior Gharana, India
- Genres: Hindustani classical music, world fusion music
- Instrument: sarod
- Website: www.ayaanalibangash.com

Ayaan Ali Bangash (born 5 September 1979) is an Indian classical musician who plays the sarod. He is the son of Amjad Ali Khan and often performs with his older brother Amaan Ali Bangash, with whom he hosted the music talent show Sa Re Ga Ma. He has also released solo albums and collaborations with brother and father.

In 2026, Bangash won a Grammy Award for Best Audio Book, Narration & Storytelling Recording for the album Meditations: The Reflections of His Holiness The Dalai Lama, a collaboration with the Dalai Lama, his father, Amjad Ali Khan, and his brother, Amaan Ali Bangash.

== Early life and career ==
Ayaan Ali Bangash was born 5 September 1979 as the son of sarod player Amjad Ali Khan and Subhalakshmi Barua Khan, a classical dancer. His birth name was Bangash and he is the seventh generation of musicians of the Gwalior musical lineage; the Bangash claim to have invented the sarod. He has an older brother, Amaan, and they were taught music by their father from a young age and later began to perform with their father on concert tours.

Ayaan Ali Bangash has performed with his father and brother since the late 1980s and performed at Carnegie Hall in 1997. He released his solo debut album of classical music in 1999. He hosted the music talent show Sa Re Ga Ma Pa on Zee TV with his brother for three years in the early 2000s. In 2002, he and his brother wrote a book about their father, Abba: God's Greatest Gift To Us. Moksha, a 2005 album made in with Amaan and Amjad Ali Khan and released by Real World Records, was nominated for Grammy Award for Best Traditional World Music Album. The brothers released Reincarnation, an album of world fusion music, in 2006, and a thematic album, Mystic Dunes, in 2007, and toured internationally. They were awarded a Lycra Style Award from MTV India in 2006. He and his brother also sing, including on the 2007 tribute album Remembering Mahatma Gandhi. Bangash joined his family to perform for the Parliament of India in 2007. In 2009, after working under a movie contract that forbade public appearances for a year, the brothers returned to making music when the production by Bollywood director J. P. Dutta was cancelled. They released a Sufi music album called Rang in 2012. They also released a new album called Headwaters in October 2013.

== Personal life ==
In 2008, Ayaan Ali Bangash married Neema Sharma, daughter of Indian film producer, actor, and director Romesh Sharma. On 1 August 2012, Neema Ali Bangash gave birth to twin boys, Zohaan Ali Bangash and Abeer Ali Bangash.

== Discography ==
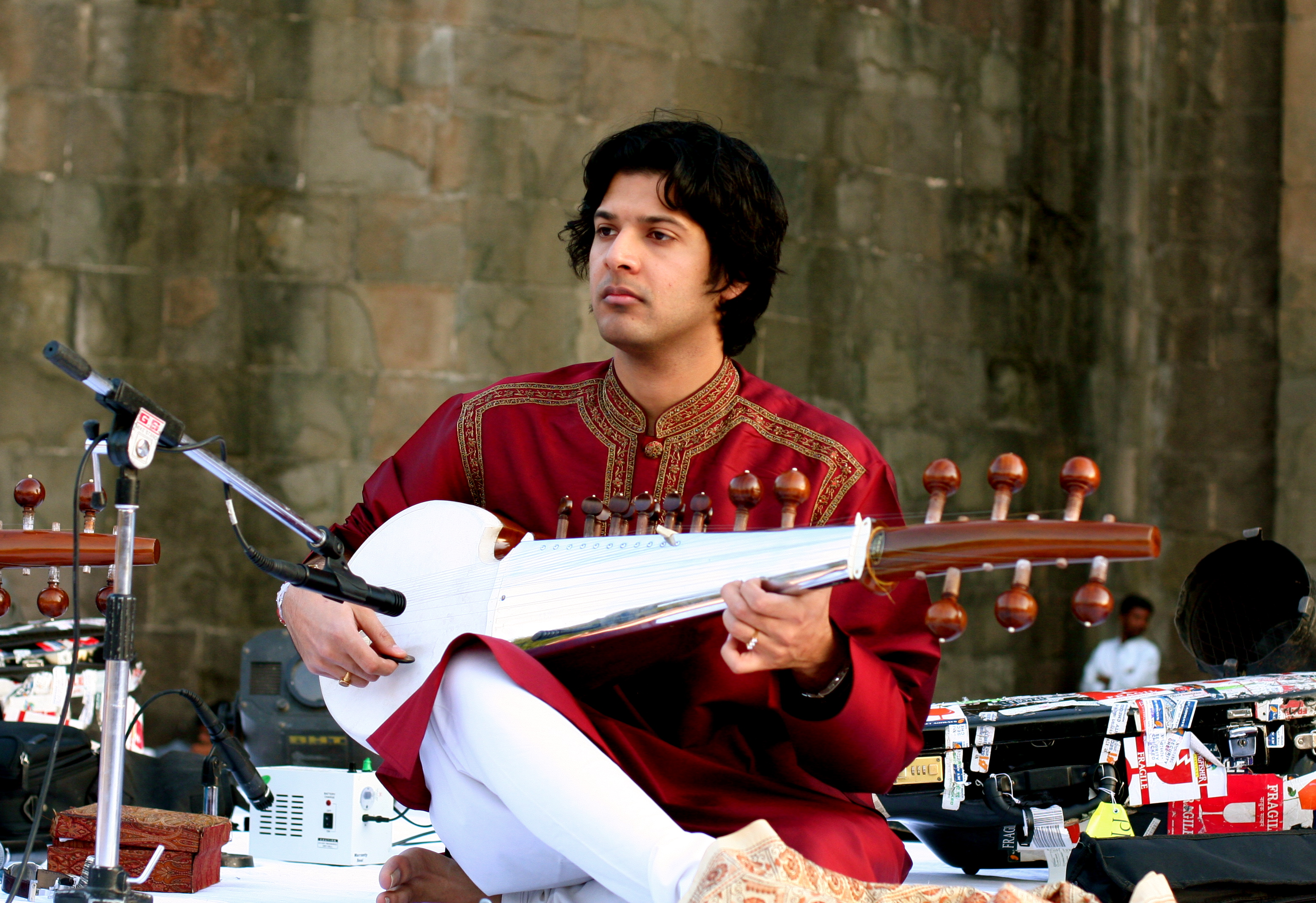
Khan playing the sarod

=== Solo ===
- Raga Bageshwari (1999)
- Footsteps (2000)
- Raga Shree (2002)
- Sonata (2005)
- Chords of Devotion (2005)

=== Ayaan and Amaan Ali Bangash ===
- Raga Puriya Kalyan, Rageshwari (2002)
- Strings Attached (2006) - with Matthew Barley (cello)
- Reincarnation (2006)
- Mystic Dunes (2006)
- Truth (2007)
- Passion (2007)
- Dreamz' (2007)

=== Amjad, Ayaan, and Amaan Ali Bangash ===
- Sarod Ghar (2000)
- The Legendary Lineage
- Sarod Maestro Amjad Ali Khan - With Sons (2001)
- Sarod for Harmony - Live at Carnegie Hall (2002)
- Moksha (2004)
- Sarod Trilogy (2006)
- Remembering Mahatma Gandhi (2007)
