= Ram Narayan discography =

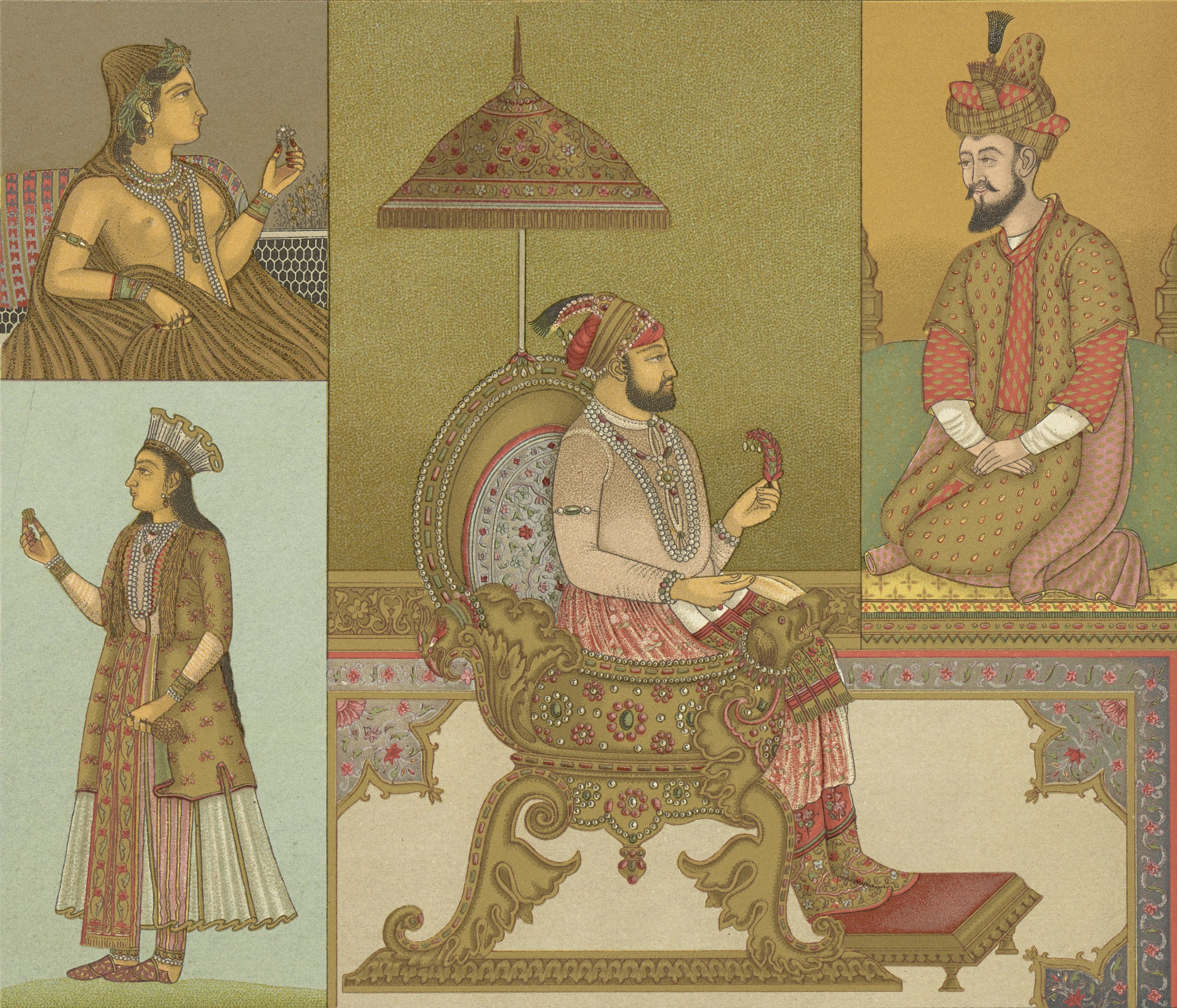
Album cover for the 2002 release Ragas Alhaiya Bilaval & Mishra Bhairavi, originally by Auguste Racinet (1825–1893)

Ram Narayan began to record music when he played on three solo 78 rpm gramophone records for His Master's Voice in 1950 and recorded an early 10 inch LP album in Mumbai in 1951. Over the following decades Narayan had numerous solo recordings published.

== Availability ==
Narayan's gramophone records and LP recordings are out of print. Three LPs were rereleased on CD: Volume 1, a partial rerelease of Ram Narayan en Concert, in 1989, and Inde du Nord in 1998 and Raga Puria Kalyan in 1999. Since the 2000s, the releases by Music Today, Nimbus Records, The Gramophone Company, Universal Music India, and Venus Records have become available in online music stores. The content of The Gramophone Company is available as streaming media from its successor Saregama.

== List of recordings ==
Year	Album details	Notes
c. 1950	Ram Narayan – Sarangi: Label: The Gramophone Company (His Master's Voice N 92514); Format: 78 rpm gramophone record, digital audio	Track list: 1. "Lalat"; 2. "Marva"
c. 1950	Ram Narayan – Sarangi: Label: The Gramophone Company (His Master's Voice N 92619); Format: 78 rpm gramophone record	Track list: 1. "Gunkali"; 2. "Puria Kalyan"
c. 1950	Ram Narayan – Sarangi Solo: Label: The Gramophone Company (His Master's Voice N 92520); Format: 78 rpm gramophone record, digital audio	Track list: 1. "Pilu thumri" 2. "Gujari Todi"
c. 1957	Ram Narayan Plays Sarangi – The Indian Musical Instrument: Label: A Treasure from Solomon's Mines (SME 3/4); Format: LP	Track list: 1. "Asavari"; 2. "Des"; Recorded 1951 with Abdul Karim on tabla
1961	Ramnarain – Sarangi: Label: The Gramophone Company (His Master's Voice 7 EPE 1212); Format: LP, digital audio	Track list: 1. "Gavati"; 2. "Chandrakauns"
1962	Ramnarain – Sarangi: Label: The Gramophone Company (His Master's Voice 7 EPE 1251); Format: LP, digital audio	Track list: 1. "Bhairavi thumri" 2. "Jog"; Chatur Lal on tabla
1964	Inde du Nord – Ragas du Matin et du Soir: Label: BAM (LD 094); Format: LP	Track list: 1. "Ragini Shuddh Todi"; 2. "Tala Lila Vihan"; 3. "Raga Marva"; Chatur Lal on tabla
1967	Beat and Bow: Label: The Gramophone Company (His Master's Voice EALP 1312); Format: LP, digital audio	Track list: 1. "Tintal"; 2. "Patadeep"; 3. "Mishra Khamaj thumri"; Chatur Lal (track one) and Nizamuddin Khan (tracks two and three) on tabla
1968	Pandit Ram Narayan – Sarangi: Label: The Gramophone Company (His Master's Voice EALP 1327); Format: LP, digital audio	Track list: 1. "Saraswati"; 2. "Marubihag"; 3. "Pilu thumri"; Manikrao Popatkar on tabla
1968	Sarangi – The Voice of a Hundred Colors – Instrumental Music of North India: Label: Nonesuch (H 72030); Format: LP	Track list: 1. "Nand-Kedar"; 2. "Jogia"; 3. "Dhun"; Mahapurush Misra on tabla
1969	Ram Narain – Sarangi: Label: The Gramophone Company (His Master's Voice EASD 1340); Format: LP, digital audio	Track list: 1. "Gujari Todi"; 2. "Lalit"; 3. "Bhairavi keharwa"; Shashi Bellare on tabla
1970	Pandit Ramnarain – Sarangi Recital: Label: The Gramophone Company (His Master's Voice EASD 1361); Format: LP, CD	Track list: 1. "Yaman"; 2. "Des thumri" 3. "Komal Rishabh Asavari"; 4. "Dhun"; Shashi Bellare (track one and two) and Suresh Talwalkar (track three and four) on tabla, rereleased on CD in 2004 by Saregama India Limited as Pt. Ram Narain
1971	Inde du Nord – Pandit Ram Narayan – Sarangi: Label: Ocora (OCR 69); Format: LP, CD, digital audio	Track list: 1. "Bairagi-Bhairav"; 2. "Madhuvanti"; 3. "Kirvani"; Suresh Talwalkar on tabla, recorded on 17 May 1971 in Paris, France, rereleased in 1998 on CD with a fourth track, "Shankara", recorded in 1979 at the National Centre for the Performing Arts, Mumbai
1975	Master of the Sarangi – Classical Music of India: Label: Nonesuch (H 72062); Format: LP	Track list: 1. "Rag: Sri"; 2. "Tabla solo" 3. "Rag: Bhupal Todi"; 4. "Rag: Kafi Malhar"; Suresh Talwalkar on tabla
1975	Raga Puria Kalyan: Label: AMIGO (AMLP 861); Format: LP, digital audio	Track list: 1. "Puria Kalyan"; Suresh Talwalkar on tabla, recorded on 23 November 1974 in Stockholm, Sweden, and rereleased on CD in 1999 with three tracks (AMCD 901)
1979	Ram Narayan (Sarangi): Label: STIL (2611S78); Format: LP	Track list: 1. "Saraswati"; 2. "Mishra Bhairavi"; 3. "Jogia"; Suresh Talwalkar on tabla
1981	Pandit Ram Narayan – The Sarangi Maestro: Label: Polydor (2392 967); Format: LP	Track list: 1. "Puriya Dhanashree"; 2. "Mishra Tilang"; Samta Prasad on tabla
1984	Ram Narayan – Stil's Sunday Solo: Label: STIL (1804S82); Format: LP	Track list: 1. "Shudh Sarang"; 2. "Multani"; Suresh Talwalkar on tabla
1984	Ram Narayan en Concert: Label: Ocora (558624/25); Format: LP	Track list: 1. "Purya Kalyan"; 2. "Mishra Pilu"; 3. "Shankara"; Suresh Talwalkar on tabla on tracks one and two, recorded on 11 November 1978 at the Salle Gaveau in Paris, track one rereleased on CD in 1989 as Volume 1, Shiv Narayan on tabla on track three, recorded in 1979 at the National Centre for the Performing Arts, Mumbai, and included in the rerelease of Inde du Nord in 1998
1988	Rag Bhupal Tori, Rag Patdip: Label: Nimbus (NI 5119); Format: CD, digital audio	Track list: 1. "Rag Bhupal Tori"; 2. "Rag Patdip"; Suresh Talwalkar on tabla, recorded on 3 and 4 December 1987 at Wyastone Leys
1989	Rag Lalit: Label: Nimbus (NI 5183); Format: CD, digital audio	Track list: 1. "Rag Lalit"; Suresh Talwalkar on tabla, recorded on 3 December 1987 at Wyastone Leys
1989	Volume 1: Label: Ocora (OCR 83); Format: CD	Track list: 1. "Rag Purya-Kalyan: Alap, Jor, Jhala"; 2. "Rag Purya-Kalyan: Bandish, Drut"; Suresh Talwalkar on tabla, rerelease of track one of the 1984 release Ram Narayan en Concert
1990	Rag Shankara, Rag Mala in Jogia: Label: Nimbus (NI 5245); Format: CD, digital audio	Track list: 1. "Rag Shankara"; 2. "Rag Mala in Jogia"; Anindo Chatterjee on tabla, recorded on 15 and 16 November 1989 at Wyastone Leys
1991	Maestro's Choice: Label: Music Today (CD A 91009); Format: CD, digital audio	Track list: 1. "Raga Marwa"; 2. "Mishra Des"; 3. "Mishra Bhairavi"; Subhash Chandra on tabla, original sound recording made by Living Media India Ltd.
1994	Masters of Raga: Label: WERGO (SM 1601-2); Format: CD, digital audio	Track list: 1. "Rag Marwa: Alap"; 2. "Rag Marwa: Gats in Teental and Ektal"; 3. "Rag Mishra Pilu: Alap and Gats in Chachar and Teental"; Suresh Talwalkar on tabla, recorded on 14 February 1976 at University of Music and Performing Arts Munich
1995	Sarangee Wadan: Label: Venus Records & Tapes Pvt. Ltd. (VCDD-326); Format: CD, digital audio	Track list: 1. "Raga Bhatiyar"; 2. "Raga Madhuwanti"; 3. "Mishra Khamaj Thumri"
1997	Immortal Essence: Label: Universal Music India; Format: CD, digital audio	Track list: 1. "Raga Jogia"; 2. "Raga Shuddha Sarang"; 3. "Raga Darbari"; Dilshad Khan on tabla, rereleased in 2005 as Immortal Essence - Sarangi: Pt. Ram Narayan (06024 982 9612)
1997	Sonorous Strings of Sarangi: Label: Oriental (CD-118); Format: CD, digital audio	Track list: 1. "Raga: Gujri Todi: Vilambit Gat in Teental"; 2. "Raga: Behag: Madhya Laya Gat in Teental"; 3. "Raga: Misra Bhairavi"; Sukhvinder Singh on tabla
2002	Ragas Alhaiya Bilaval & Mishra Bhairavi: Label: Nimbus (NI 5636); Format: CD, digital audio	Track list: 1. "Raga Alhaiya Bilaval: Alap"; 2. "Raga Alhaiya Bilaval: Compositions in slow and fast Tintal"; 3. "Raga Mishra Bhairavi: Alap"; 4. "Raga Mishra Bhairavi: Composition in fast Tintal"; Anindo Chatterjee on tabla, recorded in November 1989 at Wyastone Leys, track three covered by the Kronos Quartet on their 2009 album Floodplain
2002	Raga Jaunpuri and Raga Kafi Malhar: Label: Zig-Zag Territoires (ZZTI 021101); Format: CD	Track list: 1. "Raga Jaunpuri"; 2. "Raga Kafi Malhar"; Vineet Vias on tabla, recorded in October 2000 in Paris, France
2003	Swar Shikhar: Label: Virgin Records (583194); Format: CD	Track list: 1. "Raag Shree: Alaap, Jod, Taanas"; 2. "Raag Shree: Vilambit, Drut"; 3. "Raag Mishra Bhairavi"; Ram Narayan, Aruna Narayan, and Harsh Narayan on sarangi, Aneesh Pradhan on tabla, recorded in February 2002 at the Nehru Centre, Mumbai
2008	Akashvani Sangeet - Pandit Ram Narayan - Sarangi - Volume - One: Label: All India Radio; Format: CD	Track list: 1. "Raag - Gaud Sarang"; 2. "Raag - Malkauns"; 3. "Raag - Mishra Kafi (Tappa Ang)"; Gaud Sarang recorded 3 November 1979, Malkauns and Mishra Kafi recorded 12 May 1979
2008	Akashvani Sangeet - Pandit Ram Narayan - Sarangi - Volume - Two: Label: All India Radio; Format: CD	Track list: 1. "Raag - Multani"; 2. "Raag - Abhogi Kanada"; 3. "Raag - Bhairavi"; Multani and Bhairavi recorded 3 November 1979, Abhogi Kanada recorded October 1981
2009	The Legends of India: Label: NA Classical Audio Pvt Ltd. (NACCD 1117); Format: CD, digital audio	Track list: 1. "Raag Bhupaltodi"; 2. "Raag Kaushikdhwani"; 3. "Raag Jogiya"; Music director: Narayan Agarwal
2013	Pandit Ram Narayan: Label: Doordarshan Archives; Format: DVD	Track list: 1. "Raga: Bhatiyar"; 2. "Raga: Saraswati Todi"; 3. "Raga: Bhupal Todi"; 4. "Raga: Barwa"; 5. "Raga: Shree"; 6. "Raga: Shankara"; 7. "Raga: Malhar"; 8. "Raga: Mishra Peelu"; 9. "Raga: Jogia"; 10. "Vande Mataram"; Brij Narayan joins for "Raga: Shree" and Aruna Narayan Kalle joins for "Raga: Mishra Peelu"
2019	Namah by Thaikkudam Bridge: Format: digital audio	Track list: 1. "Saawariya"; Narayan performs as a guest musician on the opening track of the album
