= Rag Lalit =

Rāg Lalit
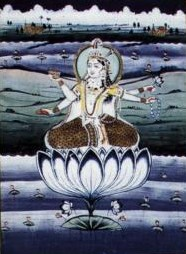
- album cover art

Studio album by Ram Narayan
- Released: 1989
- Recorded: December 3, 1987
- Genre: Hindustani classical music
- Length: 73:43
- Label: Nimbus

Rāg Lalit is a studio album by Indian classical musician Ram Narayan, released in 1989. Recorded December 3, 1987, in Wyastone Leys near Monmouth, Wales, the album features a performance of the serene dawn raga Lalit on sarangi. Narayan performs a long non-metrical introduction to unfold the raga, during which he adds a pulse, until he is joined by tabla to perform a composition.

== Origin ==
The album consists of a single track performance of the raga Lalit. Lalit is commonly described as calm and devotional and is performed at dawn. Neil Sorrel portrayed Lalit as conveying a feeling of instability and connects this to the performance time, when night changes into day.

== Recording and artwork ==
Rāg Lalit
A sample from the gat section

Rāg Lalit was recorded in a single take in Wyastone Leys near Monmouth, Wales, on December 3, 1987, and includes the tuning of the sarangi's sympathetic strings through plucking. In the performance, Narayan plays a long alap (non-metrical introduction) and a jor (performance with pulse) that increases in speed and range and makes use of gamaks (note oscillations). Suresh Talwalkar, a frequent accompanist of Narayan, joins in playing a gat (composition with rhythmic pattern provided by the tabla) in the rhythmic 16-beat cycle tintal, which is separated into four groups of four beats. When Talwalkar plays a solo, the sarangi repeats the melody. The performance was mastered in England, but not edited. In the same session that produced Rāg Lalit, the 1987 album Rāg Bhūpāl Toṛī, Rāg Paṭdīp was recorded.

The album cover features a 19th-century painting of the goddess Tripura Sundari, also called Lalita. A picture of Narayan playing the sarangi is on the back of the album, along with a quote of Yehudi Menuhin praising Narayan.

== Reception ==
Professional ratings
Review scores
Source	Rating
Allmusic	5/5 stars
New Straits Times	(favorable)

Allmusic critic Ken Hunt gave the album a maximum five star rating and called it "a magical performance", and R. S. Murthi of the New Straits Times argued that Narayan utilized his musical knowledge on the album to "stunning effect".

== Track listing ==
1. "Rāg Lalit" – 73:43

== Personnel ==
- Ram Narayan – sarangi
- Suresh Talwalkar – tabla
- Neil Sorrell – tambura
- Elizabeth Haddon – tambura
