= Pandit Motiram Pandit Maniram Sangeet Samaroh =

Indian music festival

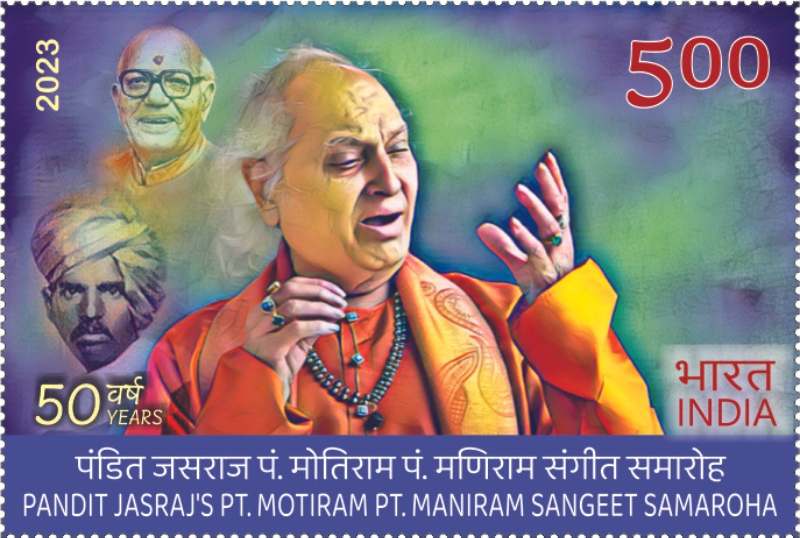
- A 2023 stamp of India dedicated to the festival and featuring Maniram (top) and Jasraj (center)
- Dates: 27 to 30 November 2009
- Locations: Chowmahalla Palace, Hyderabad, India
- Years active: 1972 – present
- Founders: Jasraj

Pandit Motiram Pandit Maniram Sangeet Samaroh is an annual Indian classical music festival held at Chowmahalla Palace in Hyderabad, India. The festival is organised by noted classical singer Pt. Jasraj in memory of his father and brother, both classical musicians. Jasraj always performs on 30 November every year, his father's death anniversary and a tribute to Jasraj's guru, his mentor and elder brother, Maniram, who died in 1986, and Jasraj renamed the festival to include his brother's name.

== History ==
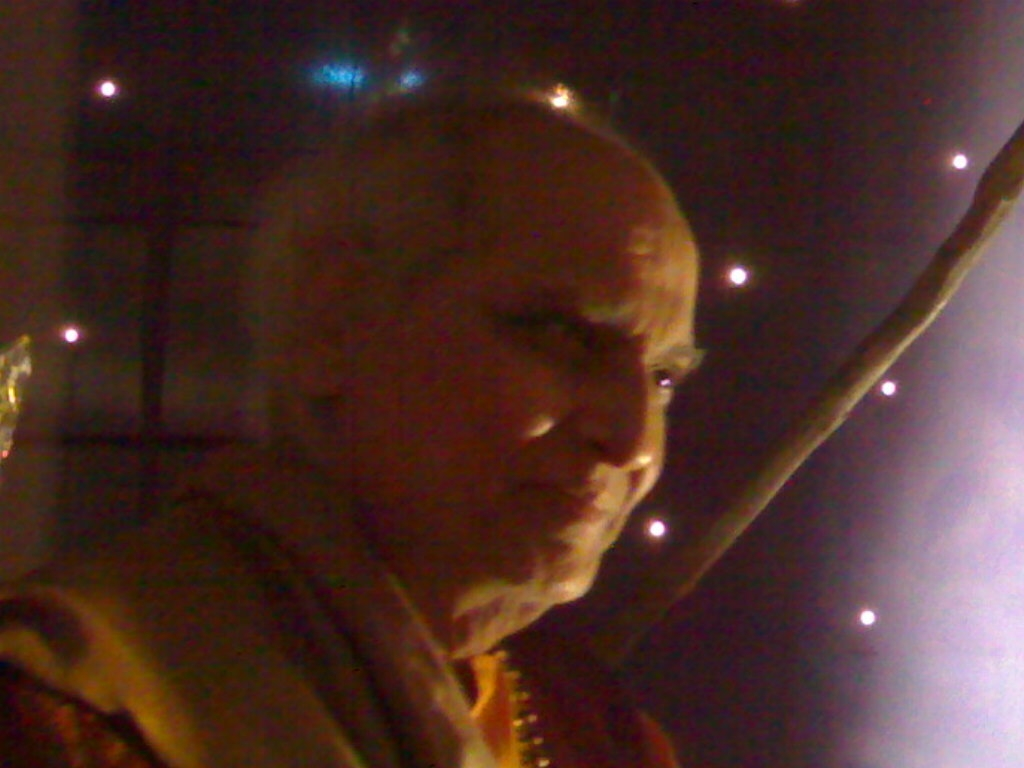
Jasraj at the 2007 festival

The festival was started in 1972 by Jasraj because of his bond with Hyderabad as he spent his childhood here and his father, Motiram's Samadhi is in the city. Maharaja Kishan Prasad Bahadur took his father to Chowmahalla Palace. His father died in 1934, five hours before his concert at Chowmahalla Palace, where he was to be announced as the Royal musician in the court of Osman Ali Khan. Motiram and Maniram were not only vocalists but composers of repute. Amjad Ali Khan and Zakir Hussain were introduced to the city audience for the first time in 1972 during the same festival.

The festival was held at various venues like Bharatiya Vidya Bhavan, CIEFL, Nizam College, and since 2009 it is held at Chowmahalla Palace. The entry to the event is free. The music festival is organised from 29 November to 1 December at the same venue, with the last day having the ‘Idea Jalsa’ music concert, clubbed with the festival this time, said Durga Jasraj.

== 2017 festival ==
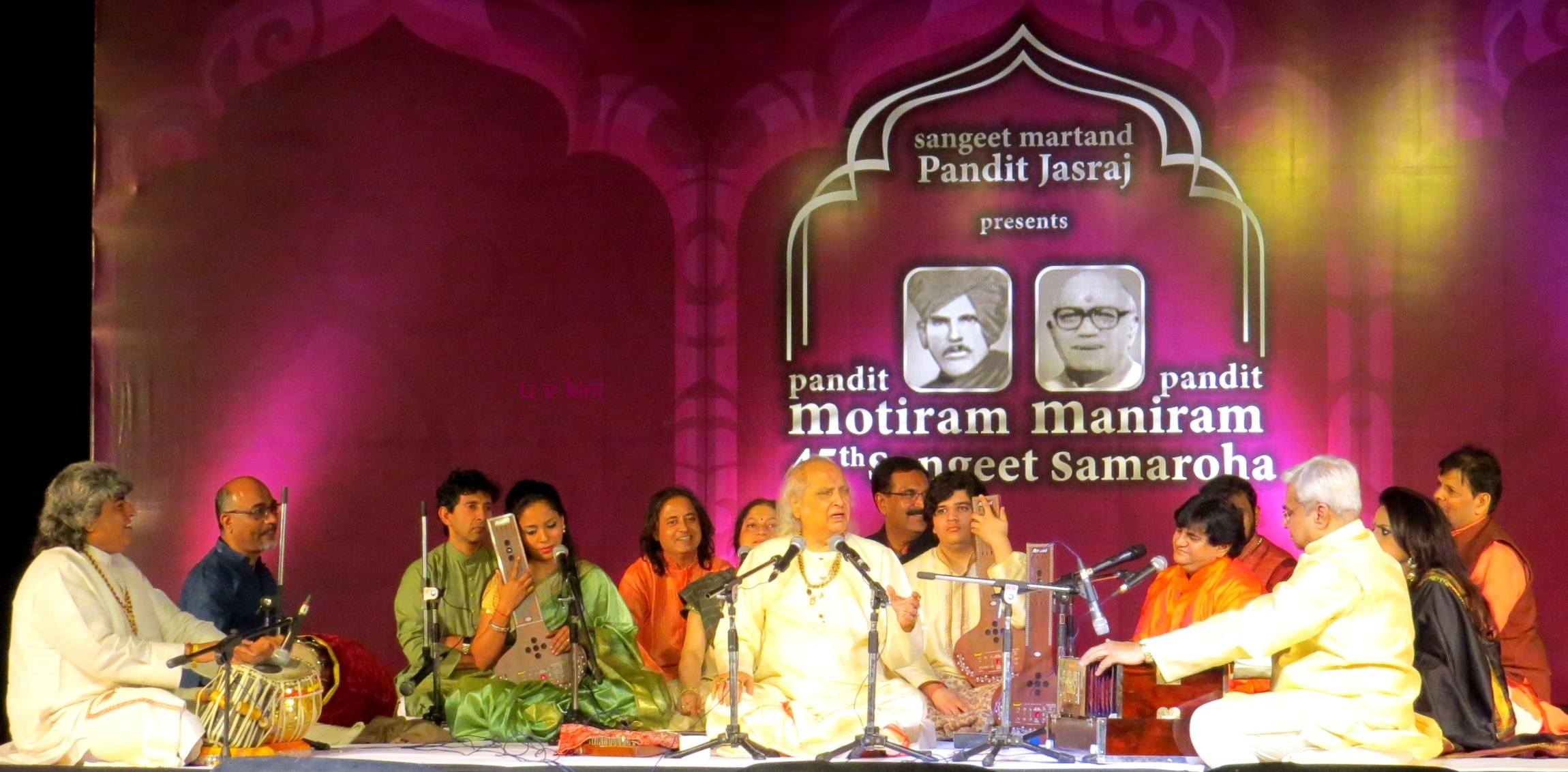
Jasraj with disciples at the 45th Pandit Motiram Pandit Maniram Sangeet Samaroh, CCRT, Hyderabad. 1st Day.

Swar Sharma - Hindustani Classical Takahiro Arai - Santoor Jasraj - Hindustani Classical

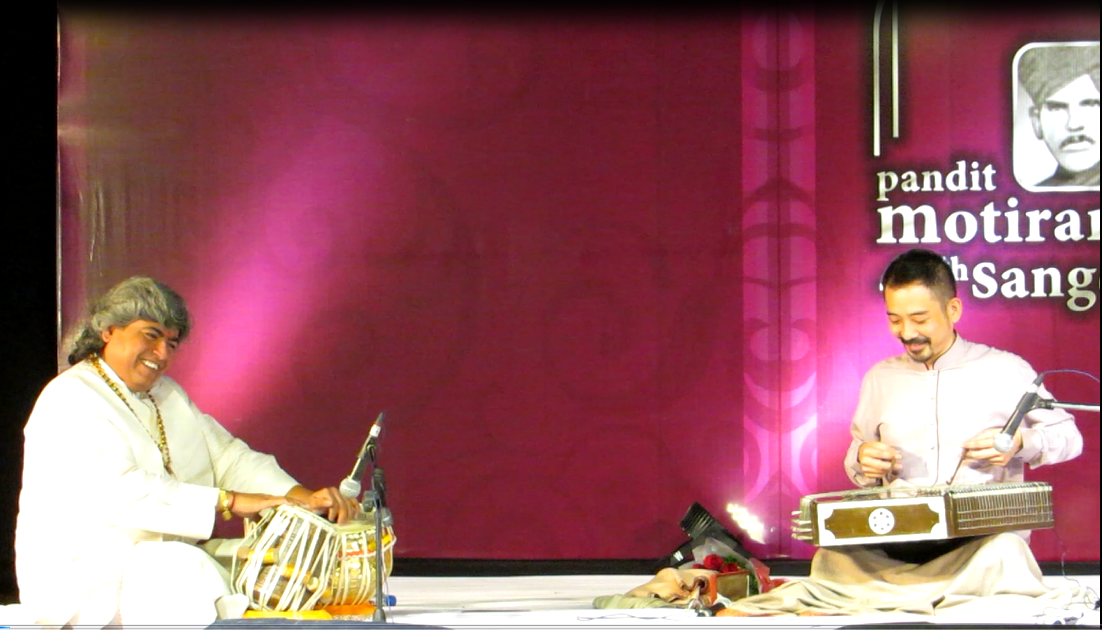
Takahiro Arai playing the santoor at the 45th Pandit Motiram Pandit Maniram Sangeet Samaroh, CCRT, Hyderabad. 1st Day.

== 2013 festival ==
The festival enters its 41st year, commencing on 29 November 2013 at Chowmahala Place Hyedrabad.

=== Day 1 ===
- Rattan Mohan Sharma and Swar Sharma (Prarthana)
- Pushpita Mishra (Odissi dance)
- L. Subramaniam (violin); Sanjeev Abhyankar (Hindustani classical vocal)

=== Day 2 ===
- Rimpa Siva and Yashwant (tabla duet)
- Sangeet Martand Pandit Jasraj (vocal)

=== Day 3 ===
Omkar Dadarkar (vocal) and Wadali Wadali Brothers

== The 2012 festival ==
- Vocal Recital by Srinivas Joshi (Son and Disciple of Pt. Bhimsen Joshi) Sarod Recital by Ustad Amjad Ali Khan
- Jasrangi Jugalbandi by Ankita Joshi (Disciple of Pt. Jasraj) and Krishna Bongane (Disciple of Ustad Rashid Khan)
- Vocal Recital by Pt. Jasraj
- Ghazal by Ranjit Rajwada, Bhajan Recital by Anup Jalota

== The 2011 festival ==
- Sanjeev Abhyankar (Hindustani vocal); Jugalbandi Shashank Subramanyam (flute) & Vishwa Mohan Bhatt (Mohan Veena)
- Rattan Mohan Sharma (Hindustani Vocal); Ramkumar Mishra (Tabla Solo); Pandit Jasraj (Hindustani vocal)
- Bhaskarnath (Shehanai); Gargi Datta and Tripti Mukherjee (Hindustani Vocal Jugalbandi); Dr.Jaspinder Narula (Sufi Qawwali)

== The 2010 festival ==
The 38th annual festival was held at Chowmahalla Palace from 29 November to 1 December

- Bharatanatyam by Sirisha Shashank, Sitar recital by Manju Mehta and vocal of Sanjeev Abhyankar
- Flute Recital by S. Akash, Tabla By Pt. Anindo Chatterjee, vocal concert of Pt. Jasraj
- Vocal by Ankita Joshi, vocal by Madhup Mudgal and Kadri Gopalnath (Saxophone)

== Past events ==
=== 2009 ===
It was held between 27 and 30 November that included Pritam Bhattacharjee (Hindustani vocal), Pt. Shiv Kumar Sharma (santoor), Tripti Mukherjee (Hindustani vocal), Pt. Ulhas Kashalkar (Hindustani vocal), Kalari Academy of Performing Arts (Kalaripayattu), Suman Ghosh (Hindustani vocal), Munnawar Masoom (qawwali), Shashank Subramanyam (flute), Yogesh Samsi (Tabla solo), Jasraj.

=== 2008 ===
It was held on 29 and 30 November. Performers include Sabir Khan (sarangi) and Sudha Ragunathan (Carnatic vocal), Niladri Kumar (sitar), Sanjeev Abhyankar (vocal), Rattan Mohan Sharma (vocal) and Kumar Bose (tabla solo), Hemang Mehta (vocal) and N. Rajam (violin), Vishwa Mohan Bhatt (Mohan Veena). Pandit Jasraj performed on the last day of the festival.

=== 2007 ===
Jasraj, Shahid Parvez, Shashank, Vocalist Pritam Bhattacharjee, Vijay Ghate, Ajay Pohankar, Manjari Chaturvedi (Sufi Kathak) and Sanjeev Abhyankar. The festival was hosted by Durga Jasraj.

=== 2006 ===
Jasraj performed on the first day, 30 November.

=== 2005 ===
Niladri Kumar (sitar), Taufiq Qureshi (percussion), Dinesh (Congo), Anand Sharma (key boards and vocals, Agnelo Fernandes (key board) and Vijay Ghate (tabla), Bhajan singer Anup Jalota performed at the festival.

=== 2004 ===
Hariprasad Chaurasia, Vikku Vinayakram and Selva Ganesh, U. Srinivas and Jasraj performed.

=== 2003 ===
Amjad Ali Khan (sarod), Raja Kale (vocal), Padma Subramanyam (Bharatanatyam) and L. Subramaniam.

== See also ==
- List of Indian classical music festivals
