= Rag Shankara, Rag Mala in Jogia =

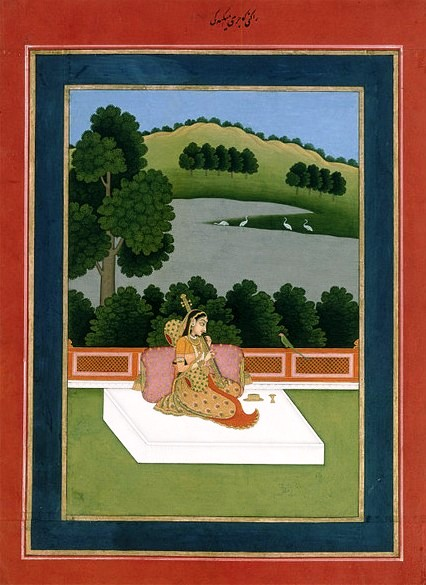
- album cover art

Studio album by Ram Narayan
- Released: 1990
- Recorded: 15 and 16 November 1989
- Genre: Hindustani classical music
- Length: 71:01
- Label: Nimbus

Rag Shankara, Rag Mala in Jogia is a studio album by Indian classical musician Ram Narayan, released in 1990. Recorded on 15 and 16 November 1989 in Wyastone Leys near Monmouth, Wales, the album features a sarangi performance of the solemn night raga Shankara and a ragamala ("garland of ragas") based on the introspective early morning raga Jogiya (or Jogia). On both tracks, Narayan performs a long non-metrical introduction to unfold the raga, during which he adds a pulse, until he is joined by the tabla (percussion) player to perform a composition.

== Origin ==
The album consists of performances of the ragas Shankara and Jogiya (also called Jogia); Jogiya is performed in raga mala form.

Shankara is considered a solemn and dignified raga that is difficult to master. It has been described by Vamanrao Deshpande as representing the "heroic mood". Luiz Martinez José argued that the raga was named for a gentle and guarding incarnation of the Hindu deity Shiva. Shankara is performed in the late night and distinguished by an emphasis on the third (Ga) and seventh (Ni) notes, the upper tetrachord, and several characteristic phrases and slow glides in descend. It has similarities to the South Indian raga Hansadhvani.

Jogiya is considered an introspective raga named for the yogi practice, and is often performed in devotional music and the light classical genre thumri. Peter Manuel described it as the most important raga of the Bhairav that (raga class based on the Bhairav scale type). Jogiya is performed at daybreak and emphasizes the tonic (Sa) and the fifth (Pa). It has several characteristic phrases and, like Shankara, is suited for the upper tetrachord. Joep Bor argued that the raga appears to be related to raga Asavari. Jogiya is one of Narayan's favorite ragas.

A raga mala ("garland of ragas") allows for the introduction of other ragas, which can be from any time of the day. The change from Jogiya into another raga and back must be smooth as there is no break in the music, making a raga mala difficult to perform.

== Recording and artwork ==
"Rāg Shankara"
The tabla join the sarangi for the composition.

Rag Shankara, Rag Mala in Jogia was recorded on 15 and 16 November 1989 in Wyastone Leys near Monmouth, Wales. Narayan begins the performances by playing a long alap (non-metrical introduction) and jor (performance with pulse). The tabla player then joins Narayan in performing a composition, repeating the rhythmic cycle on which the composition is based and playing occasional improvisations.

The album cover features a painting made ca. 1760 in Murshidabad in the provincial Mughal style of Bengal. It depicts a young woman sitting next to a lake, playing on a rudra veena to a parakeet, which symbolizes her absent lover. A picture of Narayan with his sarangi, taken by Joseph Stieger, is on the back of the album.

== Reception ==
Professional ratings
Review scores
Source	Rating
Allmusic	3/5 stars
New Straits Times	(favorable)

Allmusic critic Ken Hunt described Narayan's performance of "Rag Shankara" as "ideal for the night hours" and R. S. Murthi of the New Straits Times argued that the album showcased the "delicate tone" of the sarangi and its capacity for "seductive lyricism".

== Track listing ==
1. "Rāg Shankara" – 39:11
2. "Rāg Mala in Jogia" – 31:50

== Personnel ==
- Ram Narayan – sarangi
- Anindo Chatterjee – tabla
- Uma Mehta – tambura
- Uma Phalke – tambura
