= Ashraf Hydroz =

Musical artist

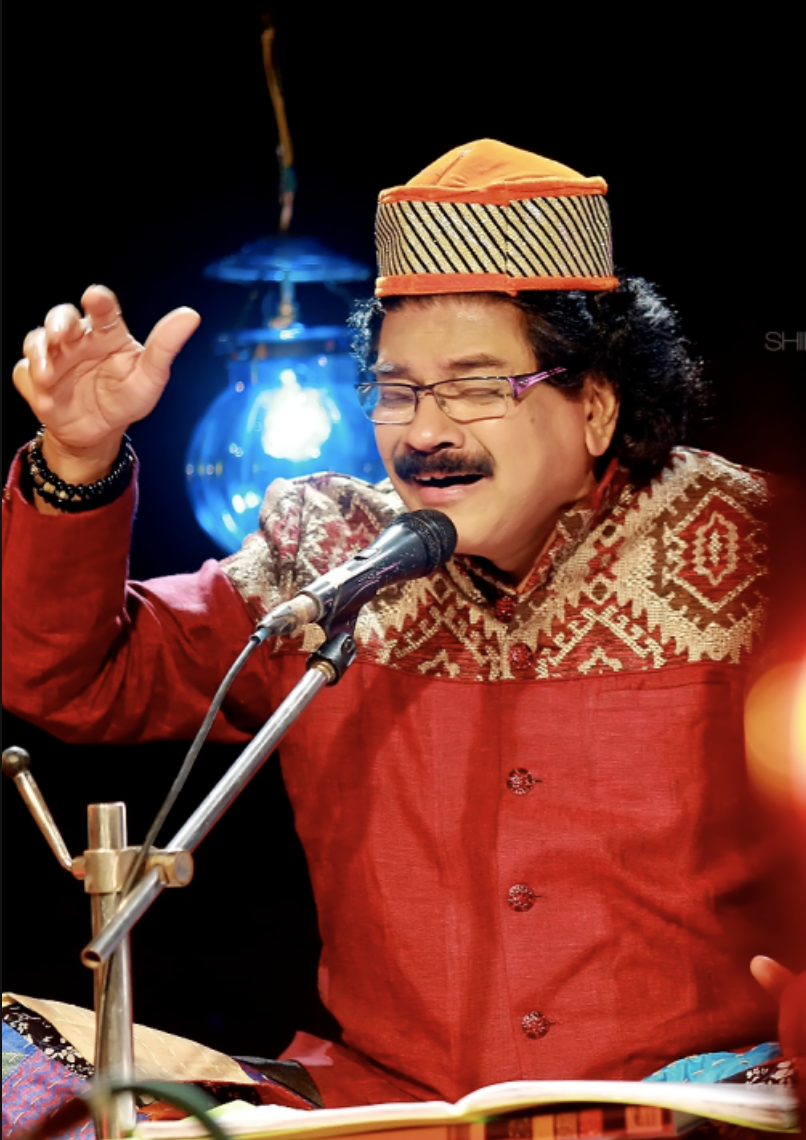

Background information
- Born: Mattancherry, Cochin, Kerala
- Origin: Indian
- Genres: Sufi, Qawwali, Hindustani, Carnatic classical
- Occupation(s): Singer, composer
- Instruments: Vocals, harmonium
- Years active: 1980–present
- Website: ashrafhydrozsufi.com

Ashraf Hydroz is an Indian Sufi and Hindustani classical musician, primarily focusing on Qawwali, mystic ghazals and Sufiana Kalaams, a devotional musical form of the Sufi Muslims. He is a disciple of renowned Hindustani musician Ustad Fayaz Khan from Bangalore.

== Biography ==
Ashraf Hydroz was born in Mattancherry, Cochin, India, and his instinct of music is carried over from his father late Mr Hydroz, who was a very versatile artist. Inspired by the Sabri Brothers, he went on to pursue a Masters and M.Phil in music from Delhi University, from the Faculty of Music and Fine Arts, where he obtained the "Sangeeta Siromani" title.

== Career ==
He has performed at various prestigious occasions including the "Kochi-Muziris Biennale" (2016-2017), and portrayed his Sufi musical enchantments across stages in India, USA and Australia. He also formed and leads his Sufi music band "Khayal-e-Qawwali".
