= Good Times, Wonderful Times =

- DVD Cover
- Directed by: Lionel Rogosin
- Written by: Lionel Rogosin; James Vaughan; Tadeusz Makarczynski
- Produced by: Lionel Rogosin
- Starring: Molly Parkin (uncredited)
- Cinematography: Manny Wynn; Emil Knebel (cameraman)
- Edited by: Brian Smedley-Aston; Danny Schik
- Music by: Chatur Lal; Ram Narayan; Ian Cameron
- Distributed by: Impact Films
- Release date: 1965
- Running time: 71 minutes

Good Times, Wonderful Times is a 1965 anti-war film, the third feature-length film written, produced, and directed by independent American filmmaker Lionel Rogosin. It was produced in London, and made with the support of James "Jimmy" Vaughan and Tadeusz Makarczynski, who assisted in an extensive multi-year search for archival footage detailing the atrocities of war.

Inspired by a deep sense of the danger of nuclear annihilation and the horrors of war, Rogosin traveled the world to gather rare undiscovered footage in the early 1960s. Brilliantly contrasting these images in all their brute horror with a trendy cocktail party in London, it is a powerful orchestration of moral issues that leaves each viewer face to face with his own responsibilities. Inspired by Hiroshima Mon Amour, it pushes the use of historical images to the extreme, creating a chain reaction resulting in an emotional explosion of horror, awareness and hope.

Finishing the film in 1964 just as the Vietnam War was in full swing, Rogosin distributed it through his company Impact Films to an estimated one million students on U.S. campuses, making him proud to claim that he helped convince thousands of young men to resist the war.

In 2008 Lionel Rogosin's son Michael Rogosin produced and directed a 24-minute documentary entitled Man's Peril about its making, tracing the fascinating history and politics in a saga as daring and uncompromising as the story behind Come Back, Africa. We discover how Rogosin and partner James Vaughan collected rare materials over a two-year period from war archives around the world despite enormous difficulties and financial pressures. Rare footage of fan Bertrand Russell filmed by Rogosin but unused in the final film is here rediscovered and shown in historical context, with a dialogue showing the deep concerns that united Rogosin and Russell, helping us discover a new dimension and facet of Rogosin as a forerunner of political thinking and humanity in cinema.
