= Jaag Utha Insan =

Jaag Utha Insan may refer to:

- Jaag Utha Insan (1984 film), an Indian Hindi-language film
- Jaag Utha Insan (1966 film), a Pakistani Urdu-language film

== See also ==
- Insan Jaag Utha, a 1959 Hindi-language film
