= Allah Rakha =

Allah Rakha may refer to:

- Alla Rakha (1919–2000), Indian tabla player
- Allah Rakha (sarangi) (1932–2015), Pakistani sarangi player
- Allah Rakha Rahman (or A. R. Rahman; born 1967), Indian music composer
- Allah Rakha (film), a 1986 Bollywood film
- Haji Mohammed Allarakha Shivji (1878–1921), Indian writer
