= Abdul Latif Khan =

Indian sarangi player (27 March 1927 - 23 April 2003)

- Born: 27 March 1927; Gohad (Dist. Bhind), Madhya Pradesh, India
- Died: 23 April 2003 (aged 74); Bhopal, Madhya Pradesh, India
- Occupations: Classical musician, instrumentalist
- Known for: Sarangi playing
- Children: Ustad Anwar Hussain, Ustad Nafees Ahmed Khan, Abdul Rashid Khan, Abdul Shafeek Khan, Farookh Latif Khan, also a famous Sarangi Maestro. Khan sahab had two daughters Fauzia Khan and Razia Khan. His grandson Sarwar Hussain is an accomplished Sarangi Maestro of the country. His Great Grandson Amaan Hussain (Son of Sarwar Hussain) is an uprising prodigy and Sarangi performer
- Parent(s): Ustad Chhote Khan, Rausiya Begum
- Awards: Padma Shri in 2002; Sangeet Natak Akademi Award in 1990

Abdul Latif Khan (1927 – 2003) was an Indian classical musician and instrumentalist, known for his proficiency in Sarangi, a stringed Hindustani classical music instrument.

== Early life and career ==
He was born in a family of musicians in Gwalior in the Indian state of Madhya Pradesh, learned music under the tutelage of Haider Khan, his grandfather, Chhote Khan, his father, Chhote Khan and Uday Khan and Haddu Khan, all were his extended family, in Khyal Gharana style and mastered the instruments such as Sitar, Santoor and Tabla Later, he learned Sarangi under Bade Ghulam Sabir Khan.

Abdul Latif Khan had performed at many music festivals like Bhopal Sarangi Mela and had been a staff artist at the All India Radio, Bhopal. He had performed as an accompanist to such renowned musicians as Bade Ghulam Ali Khan, Amir Khan, Hirabai Barodekar, Nazakat and Salamat Ali Khan, Kumar Gandharva, Mallikarjun Mansur and Kishori Amonkar.

== Awards and recognition ==
- A recipient of the Sangeet Natak Akademi Award in 1990,
- Abdul Latif Khan was honored by the Government of India with the fourth highest Indian civilian award, the Padma Shri, in 2002.

== See also ==
- Ashique Ali Khan
