= Ustad Faiyaz Khan (Karnataka singer) =

Indian musician, born 1968

- Born: 17 February 1968 (age 57); Dharwad, India
- Occupation(s): Singer, Musician

Ustad Faiyaz Khan (born 17 February 1968 in Dharwad, India) is an Indian vocalist, Sarangi artiste and a tabla player who sings Hindustani music. He is well known for rendering Khyal music & sarangi solos and also well known for Kannada Dasar pada & vachanas

== Early life ==
He was born on 17 February 1968 at Dharwad into a family of Kirana gharana musicians. He is 8th generation musicians in his family. He started his Sarangi and Vocal practice at the small age under his father's guidance. At the age of 6, he started tabla practice under the guidance of Pt. Basavaraj Bendigeri and continued his training under Ustad Nizamuddin Khan, Ustad Mamulal Sangoankar. he was a child prodigy. he started accompanying tabla with all the senior musicians at very young age . His Hindustani vocal guru is Pandit Ranganath Joshi and he was tutored in Sarangi by Pandit Ram Narayan in Mumbai after his father demise.

== Career ==
In 1995, he came to Bengaluru in search of better opportunities. Ustad faiyaz khan has performed across the country in many prestigious music festival . When he moved to Bangalore in 1995 and apart from his Indian Classical Concerts he also established himself as an accomplished contributor in the South Indian Film Industry. He has worked with famous music directors like A. R. Rahman, Rajan–Nagendra, Vijay Bhasakar, Hamsalekha, M.M Keervani, Raman Goukula and others. He also sung numerous title songs for Television Serials and Movies. He has composed music for several Kathak ballets for many noted kathak dancers. He is an accomplished Performing Artist and has travelled across the globe and performed at various prestigious venues in Malaysia, Dubai, China, Singapore, Germany, France, Europe, Canada. Today he is amongst the few Musicians in India who has the distinction of being recognised as a Vocalist, Instrumentalist and an extremely meticulous and inspiring teacher imparting the knowledge and keeping alive the finer aspects of the traditions of the Kirana Gharana. He is actively involved with own music academy, Parveen Begum Smruti Music & Edu trust (R)in Bengaluru where students are trained in Hindustani classical music in the traditional Gurukul system. Ustad Faiyaz Khan has also worked as president of Sangeetha Nirthya Academy (Karnataka)

== Family background ==
Ustad Faiyaz Khan's family origin traces back to Gwalior. His grandfather Ustad shaik Abdulla Khan was a Sarangi maestro & has served as a court musicians in the courts of Gwalior, Mysore Maharaja and Nawabs of Hyderabad and he used to accompany Abdul Karim Khan and His father Ustad Abdul khader Khan was All India Radio staff artist in (Dharwad) who was also a Sarangi maestro. Also, his mother was a Sarangi player and was a vocalist.

== Discography ==
Song	Film	Co-singer	Notes
Raakilithan (opening lines Barasu barasu badhuraa aasha ki bhoonden)	Perumazhakkalam	M. Jayachandran	

== Parveen Begum Musical and Education Trust(R) ==
He has set up a trust named Parveen Begum Music and Education Trust in the memory of his late wife Parveen Begum who died in car accident on 25 October 2012. The trust gives a platform for budding music talents to showcase their talents to the world.

== Awards and honours ==
- KEMPEGOWDA AWARD
- KARNATAKA KALASHREE
- All India Radio national music award in 1989.
- Arya Bhatta Award for TV Serial
- Pt. Putturaj Krupabhushan Samman
- Kerala Govt. State Award.
- KARNATAKA STATE AWARD
- Best String Instrument Player Awarded from (Bangalore music academy)
- Kala Kaumudi (sanskriti Vidyapeetha banglore)
- Kalavatamsa
- Uva puraskar (Kaladarpan)
- Nirman purandara Sangeetha ratna award (2020)
