= Brij Narayan =

Indian sarod player

- Born: 25 April 1952 (age 72); Udaipur, Rajasthan, India
- Origin: Udaipur, Rajasthan, India
- Genres: Hindustani classical music
- Instrument: sarod
- Years active: 1967–present
- Website: Brij Narayan

Brij Narayan (Hindi: बृज नारायण; IAST: Bṛj Nārāyaṇ) (born 25 April 1952) is an Indian classical musician who plays the string instrument sarod. Narayan was born in the Indian state Rajasthan and began to study sarod from a young age under his father Ram Narayan and other teachers. He won the All India Radio instrumentalist competition in 1967 and accompanied his father on a tour to Afghanistan in 1969. Narayan graduated from the University of Mumbai in 1972 and has since worked on movies and toured Africa, Europe, and America.

== Early life ==
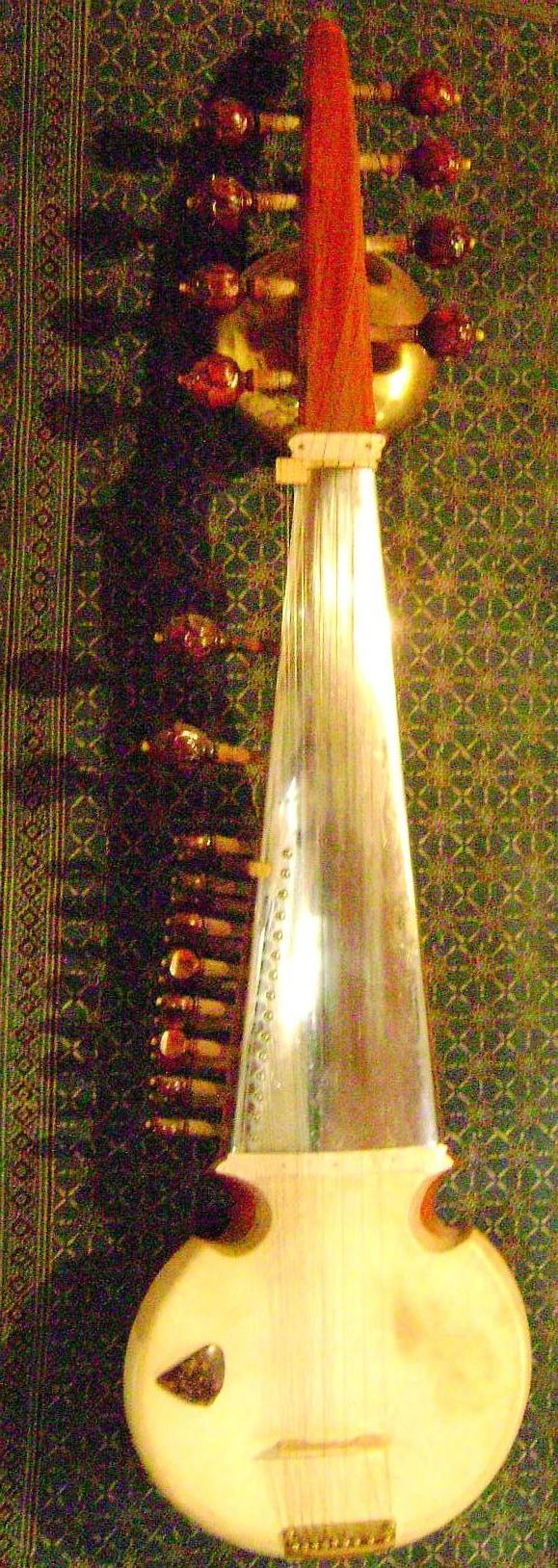
A sarod

Narayan was born on 25 April 1952 in Udaipur, Rajasthan as the oldest son of sarangi player Ram Narayan. He was taught music from an early age and began playing the sarod at the age of seven. Narayan knows how to play sarangi, but chose to specialize in playing the sarod, stating he believed his background would give him an advantage over other sarod players and that he liked its "combination of melody and percussion". Narayan studied for a short time under his uncle, tabla player Chatur Lal, and sarod player Ali Akbar Khan in Delhi, but returned to study under his father following Lal's death in 1965. In 1967, Narayan received the President's gold medal as top instrumentalist in the All India Radio competition. In the late 1960s, he was the subject of a movie, participated in a 1969 cultural delegation tour of Afghanistan with his father, and became a scholar of the Bharat Sangeet Sabha.

== Career ==
Narayan graduated from the University of Mumbai in 1972 and became a full-time musician; he performed at the Munich Olympics the same year. In the 1970s and 1980s, he toured Africa, Europe, and America, and he recorded several albums, including a collaboration with Zakir Hussain. Narayan played in the 1978 movie Main Tulsi Tere Aangan Ki and composed music for the 1988 movie The Bengali Night by Nicolas Klotz, which starred Hugh Grant. He received the Dagar Gharana Award from the Mewar Foundation in 1996 and toured France again in 1999. Narayan performed for the Society for the Promotion of Indian Classical Music and Culture Amongst Youth, to interest young Indians in Indian classical music, and played on the 2002 album Music Detected by Deep Forest. Narayan was awarded a Sangeet Natak Akademi Award for Hindustani instrumental music – sarod for the year 2015. Neil Sorrell has described Narayan as one of the best sarod players of the present time in Musik in Geschichte und Gegenwart.

== Family and personal life ==
Narayan is married, lives in Mumbai, and has children. His son Harsh Narayan was born in the mid-1980s and plays sarangi since 1997; both Brij and his son have performed with Ram Narayan. Narayan works for the Pt Ram Narayan Foundation in Mumbai, which offers scholarships to sarangi students.

== Discography ==
- Raga Lalit, Raga Bairagi Bhairav (1999)
- Raga Bhatiyar and Raga Shankara (2002)
