= Siddiqui Ahmed Khan =

Indian musician (born 1914)

Siddiqui Ahmed Khan (born 1914) was an Indian sarangi player.

Khan was born in Moradabad in 1914. He first learned from his father Rafiq Khan.

He continued under Amman Khan, Ghamit Khan, Ahmed Hussain Khan and Isharat Khan. He was the father of Ghulam Sabir Khan and the grandfather of sarangi player Murad Ali Khan.
