= Bharat Bhushan Goswami =

Indian musician

Bharat Bhushan Goswami (born 1955) is an Indian sarangi player.

== Early life ==
Goswami was born in 1955 in Brindaban. He is one of the few sarangi players, which are not from a musical family. He first learned devotional music from his grandfather Amolchandra Goswami.

== Career ==
Goswami learned sarangi first from Swami Kanhaiyalal Ji of Mathura. He continued then under the renowned sarangi player Hanuman Prasad Mishra. He has accompanied many vocalists and has performed on many festivals such as Sarangi Mahotsav and Tansen Samaroh.
