= Rattan Mohan Sharma =

Pt. Rattan Mohan Sharma
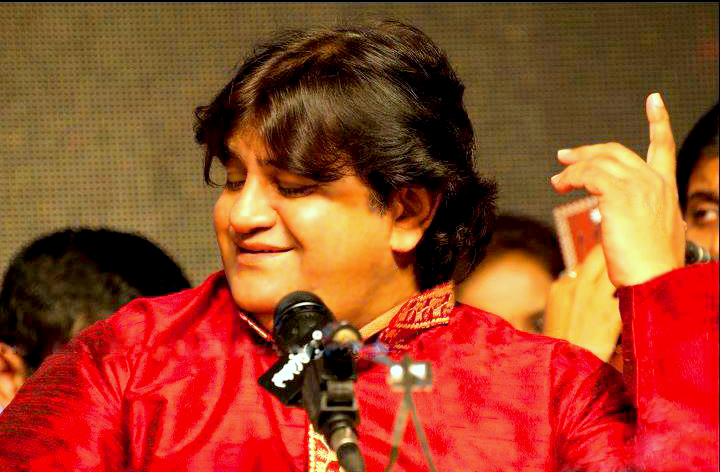
- Rattan Mohan Sharma in concert

Background information
- Born: 14 June 1971 (age 55); Rajasthan
- Genres: Khayal, Tarana, Haveli Sangeet, Tappa, Bhajan, Rajasthani Folk
- Occupation: Vocalist
- Years active: 1999-present
- Website: rattanmohansharma.com

Rattan Mohan Sharma (born 14 June 1971) is an Indian classical vocalist, belonging to the Mewati gharana. He performs classical music forms such as khyal and tarana as well as light classical forms such as Haveli Sangeet, Tappa and Bhajan as well as Rajasthani Folk. He is considered an "A" grade artist on All India Radio.

== Early life and training ==
Sharma was born in Rajasthan to Padma and Mohan Lal Sharma. He is the nephew and a disciple of classical vocalist, PanditJasraj. His affinity for percussion instruments in his youth led Sharma to practice tabla up to the age of 15. Over the years, he has trained under Pandit Jasraj.

== Career ==
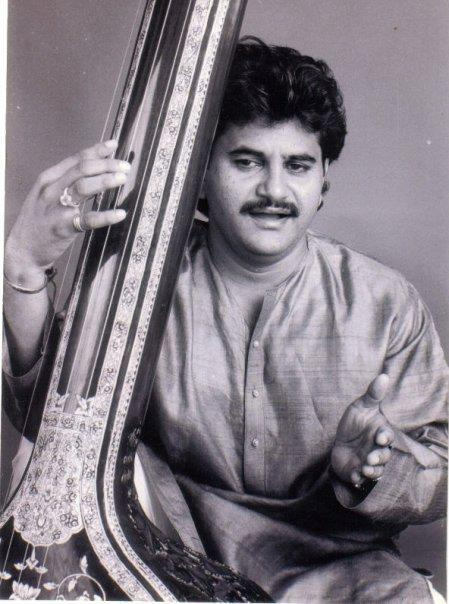
Rattan Mohan Sharma in 1995

He belongs to the Mewati Gharana and belongs to the family of vocalists such as Motiram, Maniram, Pratap Narayan, and Jasraj. He has performed in many concerts and festivals in India and abroad. As a playback singer he has performed in the mythological film Dashavatar (2008).

He performs regularly at the classical music festival Pandit Motiram Pandit Maniram Sangeet Samaroh organized by Jasraj.

== Awards & Titles ==
- Shankar Rao Vyas Award
- Pandit Jasraj rotating Trophy
- Mewati Gharana Gaurav Puraskar
- Acharya Varishtha (title)
- Sur Ratna (title)
- Sur Mañi (title)
- IWAF (gharana award)
- Rajasthan gaurav samman
- Marwar ratna
- Badshah-e-Tarana (title by people of Hyderabad)
- Kala Sarathi (by shri shri Ravi Shankar ji)
- Pandit Shivkumar Sharma Award

== Personal life ==
Sharma is married to Ekta Sharma and has a son, Swar Sharma.

== Discography ==
Devotional albums include

- Mere Bhagwan - Shri Ramji
- Mere Bhagwan - Mere Guru
- Mere Bhagwan - Shri Hanumanji
- Mere Bhagwan - Shri Saibaba
- Mere Bhagwan - Shri Ganeshji
- Mere Bhagwan - Shri Krishnaji
- Mere Bhagwan - Shri Vishnuji
- Mere Bhagwan - Gayatri Maa
- Mere Bhagwan - Durga Maa
- Jaago bhor bhayi
- Dashavatar
- Naman
- Gayatri
- Gayatri Aradhana
- Hanuman Raksha Kavach
- Navagraha Shakti
- Bhaktamar Stotra
- Navkar
- Dharohar (Hindustani Classical)
- Jasrangi (With Pta. Gargee Siddhant Dutta)
- Mewati Gharana
- Utsav (DVD with Shankar Mahadevan)
- Hanuman I
- Hanuman II
- Hanuman Dhun
- Shiv Dhun
- Healing Mantras - Heart
- Lalita Shahastra Naam
- Gayatri Shahastra Naam
- Jai Gangey
- Sapta vaar katha
- Healing Mantras- Respiration
- The Holy Trinity
- Nav Durga
- Satyanarayan Katha
- Surya
- Vaastu
- Temple Music of India (Haveli Sangeet)
- Gopal
- Krishna Leela
- Sama (Gujarati Garba, in praise of The Aga Khan)
- Maha Mrityunjay
- Sampoorna Maha Mrityunjay
- Shri Raam
- Raam Dhun
- Holi - The Great Radha Krishna Celebration
- Spiritual Mantras Vol 1
- Jago Matt Shubh Prabhat Aaya
