= Dashavatar (2008 film) =

- Directed by: Bhavik Thakore
- Written by: Hriday Lani
- Produced by: Vimal Shah
- Narrated by: Shatrughan Sinha
- Music by: Anand Kurhekar
- Release date: 13 June 2008
- Running time: 119 minutes
- Country: India
- Language: Hindi
- Budget: ₹11 crore
- Box office: ₹24.50 lakh

Dashavatar is a 2008 animated film based on the ten incarnations (Dashavatara) of Vishnu.

The film is produced by Vimal Shah under the banner of Phoebus Media. It is directed by Bhavik Thakore. Music is by Anand Kurhekar with lyrics by Sandeep Khare. It was released in cinemas in India on 13 June 2008.

== Plot ==
The story is focused in two children that are traveling through time to see the ten avatars of Vishnu from Narada Muni's point of view.

At the start of the movie, we see criminals attempting to kidnap the two children. After the sister prays to a statue of Krishna, they are saved and Narada Muni appears to them. Then after saying an incantation are taken back in time to see the story of several avatars of Vishnu.

=== The Avatars ===
- 1 Matsya the Fish.
- 2 Kurma the Tortoise.
- 3 Varaha the Boar.
- 4 Narasimha the Half man and Half lion.
- 5 Vamana the Dwarf.
- 6 Parashurama the Warrior-sage.
- 7 Rama the Prince.
- 8 Krishna the Cowherd prince.
- 9 Buddha the historical Buddha.
- 10 Kalki the Avatar of the Future.

== Cast ==
- Tarun Khanna/Sachin Khedekar - Vishnu, Rama, Krishna and The Buddha
- Shreyas Talpade - Narada
- Rupali Ganguly - Apsara
- Vinay Apte - Kamsa
- Ashish Vidyarthi - Hiranyakashipu
- Tom Alter - Varaha, Narasimha & Parashurama Avtaar
- Vinod Kulkarni - Shukra
- Kenneth Desai - Indra
- Pawan Kalra - One of the demons
- Ashok Samarth - Ravana
- Shishir Sharma - Bali Raja
- Vatsala M Sharma - Aarti
- Shatrughan Sinha - Narrator

== Soundtrack ==
The film's music was composed by Anand Kurhekar and Released by T-Series. All Lyrics were Penned by Sandeep Khare.

Dashavatar

Soundtrack album by Anand Kurhekar
- Released: 2008
- Recorded: 2008
- Genre: Soundtrack
- Length: 29:17
- Label: T-Series
- Producer: Anand Kurhekar

No.	Title	Artist(s)	Length
1.	"Dashavatar"	Shankar Mahadevan, Shreya Ghoshal	3:04
2.	"Raat Suhaani Mast Chandni"	Shaan, Shreya Ghoshal	5:07
3.	"Sadaa Sumiran"	Pandit Sanjeev Abhyankar	5:38
4.	"Phir Se Chamke Tim Tim Taare"	Rahul Deo, Ketaki Mategaonkar	4:32
5.	"O Mohini O Kamini"	Rattan Mohan Sharma, Kunal Ganjawala	6:25
6.	"Bolo Bolo Ramchandra Ki Jai"	KK	4:31
Total length:			29:17

== See also ==
- List of animated feature films
- List of indian animated feature films
