= Shankara (raga) =

Hindustani raga

- Thaat: Bilaval
- Time of day: 2nd Prahar of the Night (9PM to 12AM)
- Arohana: S G P N D Ṡ N Ṡ
- Avarohana: Ṡ N D P, G P G (R) R S
- Pakad: Ṡ N P G P, R G R S
- Vadi: Ga
- Samavadi: Ni
- Similar: Hansadhvani

Shankara is a raga in Hindustani classical music. There is a Carnatic Tillana in this Raga composed by Dr. T. V. Gopalakrishnan.

== Origin ==
The raga emerges from Bilaval thaat.

== Technical description ==
The raga is of audav-shadav nature, i.e., it has five swaras (notes) in the arohana (ascent) and six in the avarohana (descent). All the swaras are used are shudhha swaras, no komal swara is used. It is an Uttaranga pradhan raga, with the higher notes on the saptak (octave) being used more frequently.

Arohana: S G P N D Ṡ N Ṡ
Avarohana: Ṡ N D P, G P G (R) R S
Pakad: Ṡ N P G P, R G R S

The vadi swara is Ga, and the samvadi is Ni. The rishabh (Re) is very weak, but yet significant in the way it supplements the gandhar (Ga).

== Samay (time) ==
This proper time to sing this raga is supposed to be the 2nd Prahar of the Night (9PM to 12AM)

== See also ==
- Rag Shankara, Rag Mala in Jogia
