= Ramdas Palsule =

Indian tabla player (born 1963)

Pandit Ramdas Palsule
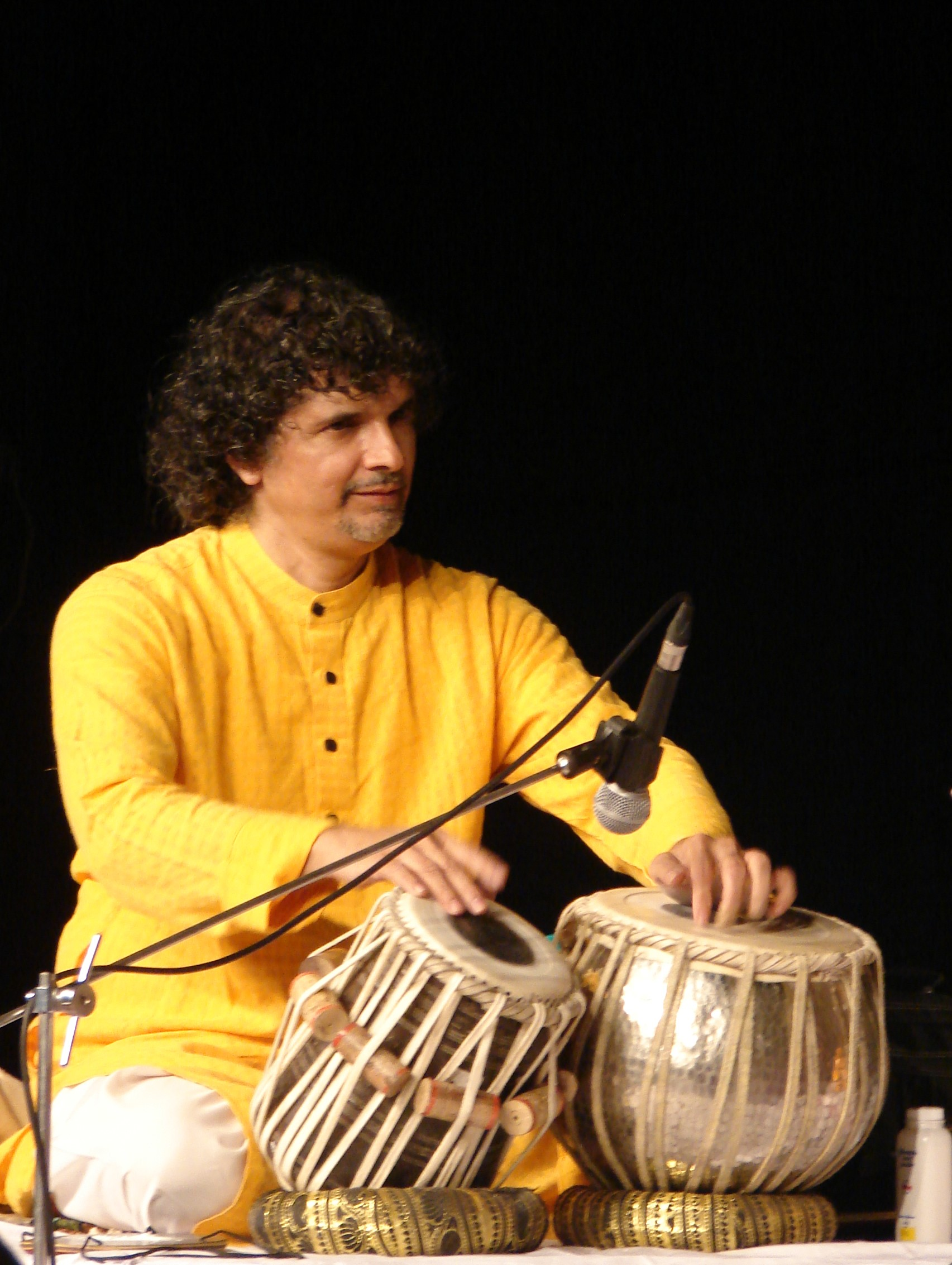
- Pt. Ramdas Palsule at a concert in Pune (2015)

Background information
- Born: Ramdas; 30 March 1963 (age 63); Pune, Maharashtra, India
- Genres: Indian Classical Music
- Occupation: Musician
- Instrument: Tabla

Pandit Ramdas Palsule (born 30 March 1963) is an Indian Tabla player. He is also an A grade artist of All India Radio and Doordarshan.

== Early life ==
Ramdas was born into a well-educated family in Pune, India. His father Dr. G. B. Palsule was a recipient of the President’s Award, Kalidas Puraskar, K.K. Birla Award and many more for his work in Sanskrit literature and for his Sanskrit epic – ‘Vainaayakam’ on Swaatantryaveer Savarkar.

Ramdas is an alumnus of Jnana Prabodhini Prashala and College of Engineering, Pune (COEP). He was introduced to Tabla by Pt. G. L. Samant in his school days. After achieving his bachelor’s degree in mechanical engineering, he chose to pursue a career in music over a career in engineering at the age of twenty-three. He became a disciple of Tabla Maestro Taalyogi Pt. Suresh Talwalkar.

== Career ==
As a solo artist, Ramdas developed his own style of presenting traditional compositions with a new perspective and fresh thought process. He mastered the craft of “Jod-Taal” and “Jaati-Bhed” and earned praise of connoisseurs and patriarchs alike with his vivid style of presentation and with his trademark subtle contemporary touch. Ramdas is known in the music fraternity as a riyaazi (hard-working) musician.

Ramdas has performed with Pandit Jitendra Abhisheki, Pandit Jasraj, Vidushi Prabha Atre, Pandit Shivkumar Sharma, Pandit Hariprasad Chaurasia, Pandit Birju Maharaj, Ustad Sultan Khan, Begum Parveen Sultana, Ustad Amjad Ali Khan, Vidwan L. Subramanyam, Vidwan M. Balamuralikrishna, Ustad Shahid Parvez Khan, Pandit Vishwa Mohan Bhatt, Pandit Ulhas Kashalkar, Pandit Venkatesh Kumar, Pandit Ronu Majumdar. Ramdas has also shared stage with Kadri Gopalnath, Mysore Nagraj and Mysore Manjunath, Sridhar Parthasarathy, Kumaresh Rajagopalan, Jayanthi Kumaresh and many more.

Ramdas performed solo at the Barsi of Ustad Alla Rakha Khansaheb in February 2018. Other solo performances include the Sawai Gandharva Sangeet Mahotsav (Pune), Saptak Festival (Ahmedabad), national music conferences of the All India Radio, SPIC MACAY, Isha Foundation’s Yaksha 2020, Dussehra Festival (Mysuru), All Bengal Festival (Kolkata), Tansen Mahotsav (Gwalior), Kalidas Festival (Ujjain), Pt. Abhisheki Mahotsav (Goa). He is a Guru at The Lalit Kala Kendra Center for Performing Arts of University of Pune since 1995, and at Bharti Vidyapeeth School of Performing Arts since 2008.

Since 2001, Ramdas has been arranging concerts and propagating Hindustani Classical Music in North America and Europe.

He is an empaneled musician of ICCR since 1988 and a committee member of CFPGS (Cultural Functions and Production Grant Scheme) of Ministry of Culture, Government of India since 2018.

== Teaching work ==
Ramdas is a founding member and Guru at Avartan Gurukul – a unique institution for studying Hindustani music in Pune, India. His educational background helps him understand the nuances of the pedagogical aspects of Hindustani music. Some of his more notable students include Saleel Tambe (UK), Harshad Kanetkar (US), Nikhil Harishchandrakar (Australia), Ganesh Tanawade, Einav Baram (Israel), and Pablo Llambias (Chile).

== Social work ==
Every year since 2001, Ramdas has been organizing a Blood Donation Camp in Pune, India. In collaboration with Rotary Club of Pune Westend, and Maharashtra Mandal (Bay Area, US), he has helped raise funds for musicians affected economically due to Covid-19 Pandemic under project “Saath”. He was also one of the organizers/performers of a fund-raiser concert “Artist for Artist” for instrument-makers in the flood-affected areas of Sangli and Kolhapur.

== Notable concerts in India ==
- Sawai Gandharva Bhimsen Festival
- Barsi of Ustad Allah Rakha Khansaheb (2018)
- Saptak Annual Music Festival
- All India Radio
- Isha Foundation’s Yaksha (2020)
- Dussehra Festival (Mysuru)
- Tansen Mahotsav, Gwalior
- Kalidas Festival, Ujjain
- Performances for SPIC MACAY
- All Bengal Festival, Kolkata
- Surashri Kerkar Sangeet Samoroh, Goa
- Balgandharva Sangit Festival, Jalgaon
- Kala Sangit Mahotsav
- Manhar Sangeet Sabha, Pune
