= Dhantara =

The dhantara (or dhanotu) is a bowed string instrument found in Himachal Pradesh state of India. The instrument is similar to the classical sarangi, but is more primitive, having only three melody strings and no tarab (sympathetic strings). The instrument is popular among the Gaddi people of that state, and often decorated with flowers.
