= Aruna Narayan =

Sarangi player from India

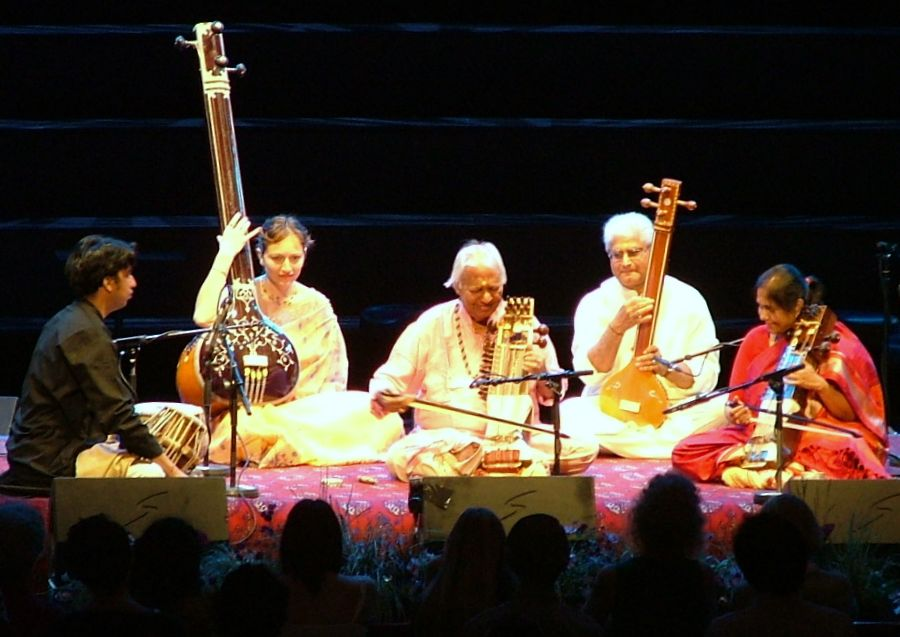
- Aruna Narayan (far right) performing in 2009

Background information
- Born: 1954 or 1955 (age 70–71); Mumbai, India
- Genres: Hindustani classical music
- Instrument: sarangi
- Years active: 1973–present
- Website: arunanarayan.com

Aruna Narayan Kalle is an Indian musician who plays the bowed instrument sarangi. She is the daughter of internationally successful sarangi player Ram Narayan and is regarded as the first Indian woman to professionally play the sarangi.

== Early life and career ==
While Narayan always watched her father Ram Narayan play the sarangi and sometimes played the tanpura for him, she decided to learn to play the sarangi herself only at the age of 18 in 1973, much to the delight of her father. Her father picked out a sarangi for her from Nashik, which was previously owned by a travelling sadhu. She still plays this sarangi as of 2019.

Within three years of training, she gave her first performance at the National Centre for the Performing Arts. She then accompanied her father for his masterclasses at the NCPA with the surbahar player Annapurna Devi and renowned tabla player Ahmed Jaan Thirakwa.

Following her marriage in Pune, she continued learning to play from her father, often shuttling between Pune and her hometown, Mumbai. Like her father, she has worked towards popularising the sarangi as a solo instrument. She has also collaborated with other genres of music. She replaced a violin solo with the sarangi in Antonio Vivaldi's Four Seasons while working with Canada's Tafelmusik Baroque Orchestra and later composed music for San Francisco's Kronos Quartet. However, she avoids fusion music.

Narayan has helped compose the background score for movies like Monsoon Wedding (2001) and Life Of Pi (2012) and usually works with the composer Michael Dyanna for such projects.

== Film scores ==
| Film | Release date |
|---|---|
| Monsoon Wedding | 2001 |
| Life Of Pi | 2012 |

== Personal life ==
Narayan is the daughter of sarangi player Ram Narayan and the sister of sarod player Brij Narayan. She was born and brought up in Mumbai and got married and moved to Pune. As of 2019, she lives in Toronto, Canada.
