= Munnawar Masoom =

Indian singer of qawwali

- Born: Bhopal, Madhya Pradesh, India
- Genres: Qawwali, ghazal
- Occupation: Musician
- Instruments: Vocalist, harmonium, tabla

Munnawar Masoom is an Indian singer of qawwali.

== Early life ==
Munnawar Masoom was born in Bhopal, Madhya Pradesh, India.

== Career ==
Munnawar Masoom is popular for his song Husne Muhabbat ka ada. He is known for his intense, powerful, energetic style and his rendering of pieces of the celebrated Sufi mystic poet Amir Khusrow. He draws the audience closer, with renditions of lyrics by Amir Khusro and Sufi Kalam, explaining the meaning of the poetry behind a devotee's yearning for god.

He performed on Idea Jalsa on Doordarshan, Times festival and Pandit Motiram Pandit Maniram Sangeet Samaroh organised by Pandit Jasraj.Also he has performed with Kailash Kher

== Awards and recognition ==
Munnawar Masoom was given the title, Fakr-e-Madhya Pradesh by Government of Madhya Pradesh.
