= Allah Rakha (sarangi) =

Pakistani sarangi player (1932–2000)

Allah Rakha (sarangi player)
- Born: 1932; Sialkot, Punjab, British India
- Died: 2015
- Occupation: sarangi player
- Known for: Sarangi player as an accompanist to vocalist musicians on Pakistani television and Radio Pakistan
- Awards: Pride of Performance Award by the Government of Pakistan in 1995

Allah Rakha (1932 – 2015), also referred to by the title Ustad, was a Pakistani sarangi player who often performed with music groups on Pakistan Television. Among the music instruments of the Indian subcontinent, the sarangi is a complex and difficult to play stringed instrument. According to Allah Rakha's obituary in a newspaper, "It should not be forgotten that to play the sarangi well is a feat in itself; it requires decades of dedicated application."

== Early life and education ==
Allah Rakha was born in Muzaffar, a village in Sialkot District of Punjab, in 1932. During early childhood, his family moved to Amritsar, British India where he was raised. He acquired his initial education in classical music and sarangi playing from his father, Ustad Lal Din. Later, he became the student of three renowned sarangi players, Ustad Ahmadi Khan (died in Delhi in 1945), Ustad Alladiya Khan (1855 – 1946), and Ustad Nathu Khan (1920 – 1971) of Pakistan Television, Karachi Center.

== Career ==
His talent was first appreciated in his early teenage years, when he performed in a contest at a local wedding, and was lauded for his performance of Raga Desi.

After the partition of India in 1947, Allah Rakha migrated to Pakistan, and settled temporarily in Karachi, where he also recalled having had the honor of playing live for Mohammad Ali Jinnah. It was also here that he met Ustad Bade Ghulam Ali Khan and honed his skills as a sarangi accompanist to performing vocalist musicians on radio and TV.

He moved to Lahore in 1948, and for almost two decades, he worked at the Radio Pakistan Lahore Station, and also in the Pakistani film industry as a recording artist. In Lahore, his knowledge of music was further broadened during his association with Ustad Sardar Khan (vocalist), son of Umrao Khan, and grandson of Tanras Khan.

Then in 1968 he moved to Rawalpindi and became a regular employee of Radio Pakistan, Rawalpindi, where he served till his retirement in 1992. The sarangi, which is made with horse hair and goatskin, brass and wood, takes long periods to master. Allah Rakha died in 2015.

He had also traveled abroad several times and performed in Afghanistan, Sri Lanka, India, China, Dubai, France, Hungary, Italy, the United Kingdom, and Germany. In 1997, he performed as a soloist with the Belgian Rajhans Orchestra in a concert tour starting in Islamabad and later performing in Lahore and Karachi, directed by composer-conductor Hans Vermeersch.

== Awards and recognition ==
Pride of Performance Award by the President of Pakistan for his lifelong devotion to classical music in 1995.
