= Yashwant =

Yashwant or Yashawant is a given name.

== People ==
- Yashwant Vithoba Chittal (born 1928), Kannada fiction writer, Academy Award recipient for his work Purusottama
- Yashwant Jadhav, Indian politician
- Yashwant Singh Parmar (1906–1981), Indian politician and Chief Minister of Himachal Pradesh
- Yashwant Sardeshpande, theatre actor, director, playwright
- Yashwant Singh (Lok Sabha member), Indian politician
- Yashwant Sinha (born 1937), Indian politician
- Yashwant Trivedi, Indian Gujarati poet, essayist and critic
- Yashwant Vyas, Indian author, journalist and editor
- Yashwant Dev (1926 – 2018), Indian Marathi poet
- Yashwantrao Chavan, Indian politician
- Yashwantrao Holkar, Indian king
- Prakash Yashwant Ambedkar, national president of the Bharipa Bahujan Mahasangh Indian political party
- Yashwant Dinkar Pendharkar, Indian Marathi poet

== Other ==
- Yashwant Sagar, a dam reservoir in India
- Yashwant Stadium
