= Bundu Khan =

Pakistani sarangi player (1880–1955)

- Born: 1880; Delhi, India
- Died: 13 January 1955 (aged 74–75); Karachi, Sindh, Pakistan
- Occupation: Sarangi player
- Children: 2, including Lal Mohammad Iqbal

Bundu Khan (1880 – 13 January 1955) was a Pakistani sarangi player.

== Early life and career ==
Khan was born in Delhi, prior to the partition of India, into a family of musicians. He received early training in the sarangi from his father, Ali Jan Khan, starting at age eight, and later from his uncle Mamman Khan, a veteran sarangi and sursagar player who belonged to the Patiala gharana (House of Patiala) of classical musicians.

Khan played the sarangi on All India Radio, Delhi Station, when broadcasting first started in 1935. He served the princely court of Indore for 27 years as a court musician. He studied Sanskrit in order to have access to the classical music of ancient India. He introduced what is known as Meendh Soot Ki Sargam, in which the musician, in the midst of recurring melody, shifts from one note to another. He had mastered over 500 ragas and "had great mastery over [the] Raga system, Taan-palta, [and] various traditional compositions – especially Ragas such as Malkauns, Malhar, Bhairav."

Khan played a sarangi that was a smaller size than the standard, with some metal strings instead of gut strings for a different sound.

He was also a musical theorist, or musicologist. His book on music, titled Jauhar-i-Mausiqi in Urdu and known as Sangeet Vivek Darpan in Hindi, was published simultaneously in both languages in June 1934.

== Death and legacy ==
Following the Pakistan Movement and the partition of India in 1947, Khan migrated to Pakistan and lived in Karachi, continuing to play the sarangi from "all the radio stations of Pakistan" until his death on 13 January 1955. He had two sons,the elder one Ustad Umrao Bundu Khan and younger son Buland Iqbal Khan who carried on their father's musical tradition. Ustad Umrao Bundu Khan was awarded the Tamgha-i-Husn-e-Karkargadi & Pride of Performance,in 1981 for his artistic services, And received a Pakistani Television Gold Medel in 1982 . Buland Iqbal Khan was music director who has famous laal Mohammed Iqbal

== Awards and recognition ==
- Pride of Performance award, bestowed by the President of Pakistan, 1985 (awarded posthumously)
