= Vijay Ghate =

Indian tabla player (born 1964)

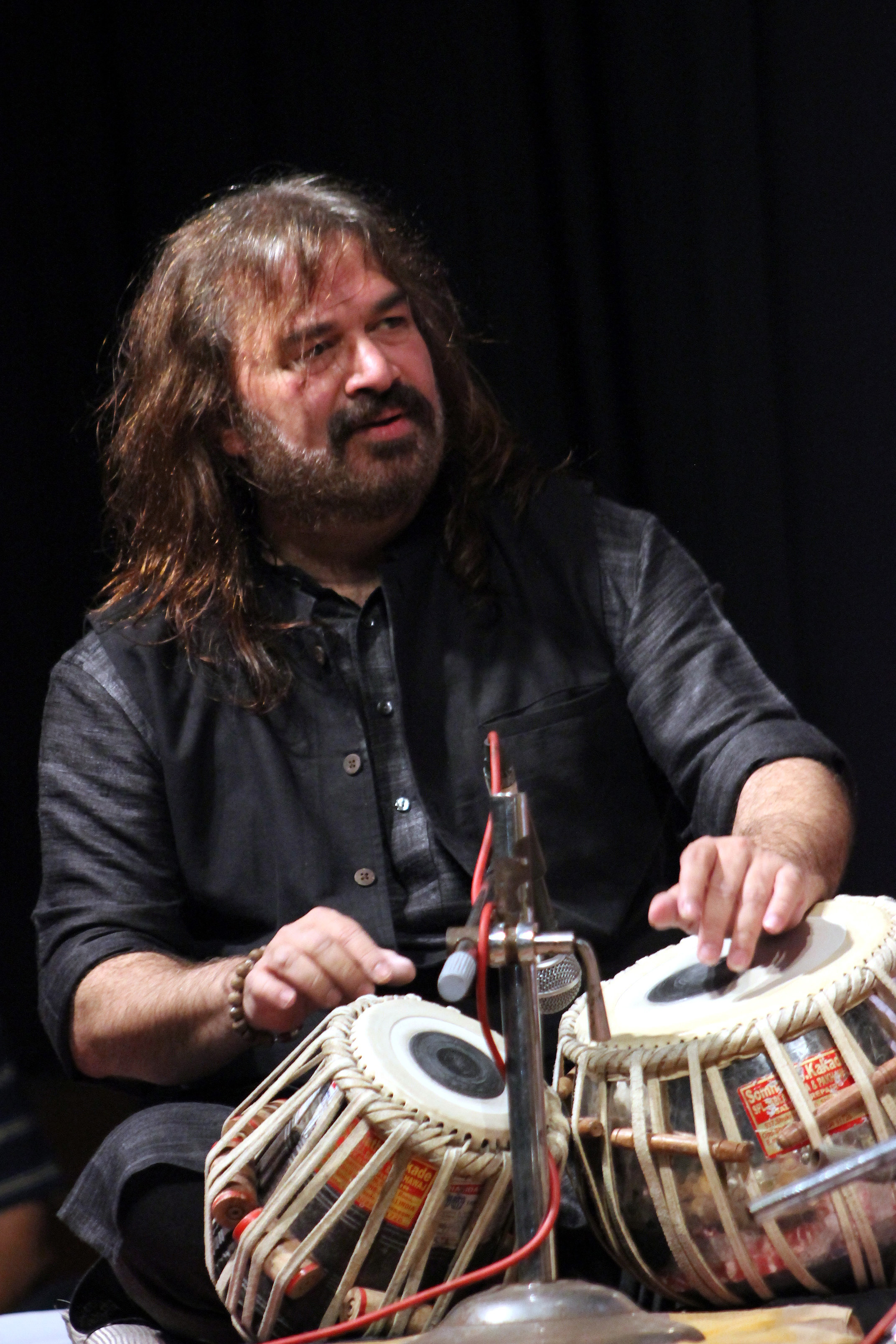
- Vijay Ghate performing in Bharat bhavan Bhopal September 2015

Background information
- Born: Vijay; 18 October 1964 (age 61)
- Origin: Jabalpur, Madhya Pradesh, India
- Genres: Indian classical music
- Occupation: musician
- Instrument: Tabla
- Years active: 1990 onwards
- Website: vijayghate.com

Vijay Ghate (born 18 October 1964) is an Indian tabla player. He was awarded with "Padma Shri" award in 2014, the fourth highest civilian award by Government of India.

== Early life ==
Ghate was born in Jabalpur, Madhya Pradesh. He started learning his art at an early age of three in Jabalpur. He then moved to Mumbai, and learned for over twelve years under Taalyogi Pandit Suresh Talwalkar.

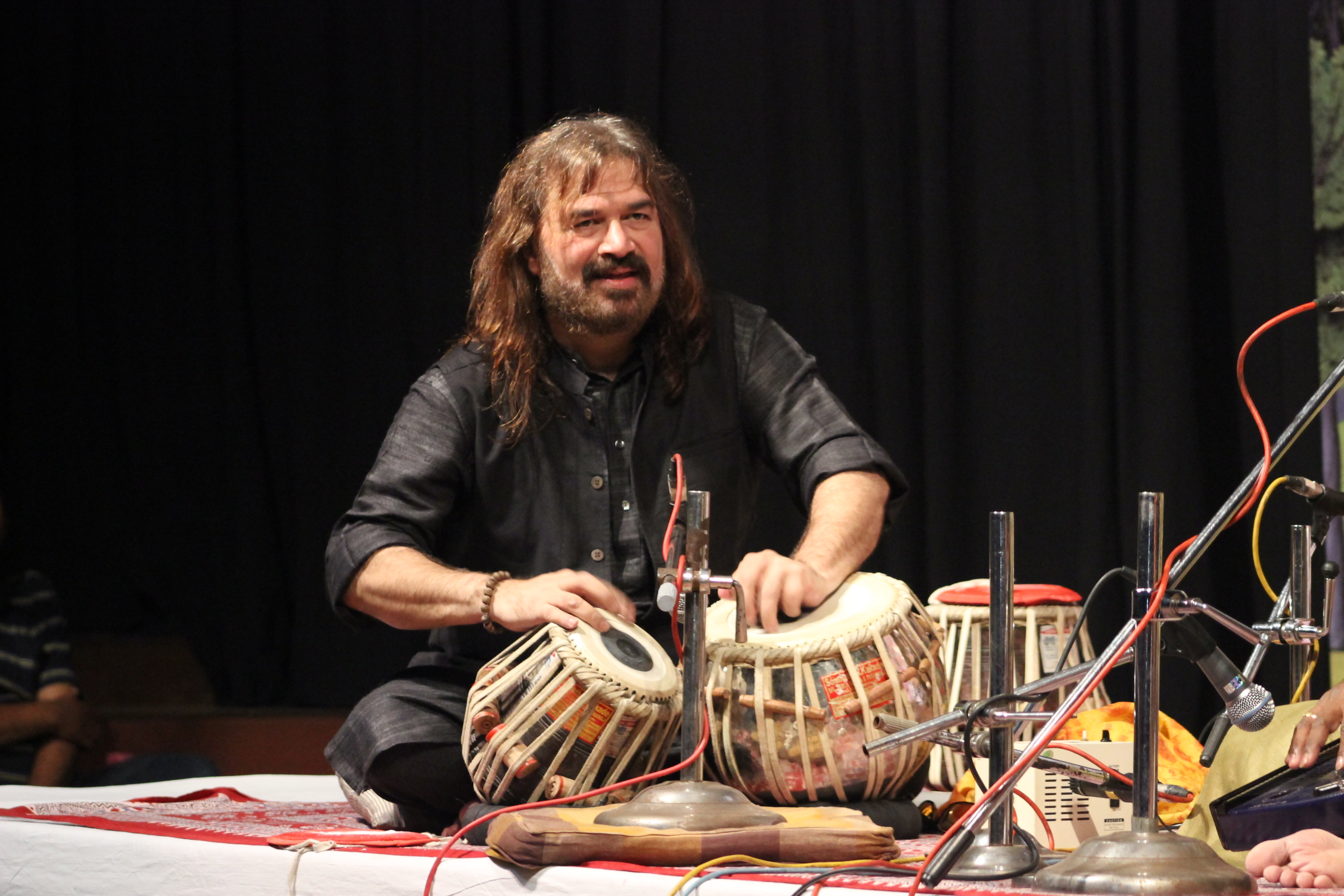
Vijay Ghate Performing at Bharat Bhavan Bhopal 'Baadal Raag-13' September 2015

== Career ==
Vijay Ghate was personally chosen by Pandit Suresh Talwalker to play on his behalf in many concerts. Ghate accompanied Indian classical musicians, including Hariprasad Chaurasia, Vilayat Khan, Pandit Jasraj, Kaushiki Chakrabarty, Shivkumar Sharma, Amjad Ali Khan, Shahid Parvez, and Vishwa Mohan Bhatt as well as Indian Classical Kathak dancers including Birju Maharaj and Nandkishore Kapote.

Ghate also collaborated with jazz guitarist, Larry Coryell and saxophonist, George Brooks.

== TaalChakra ==
Taalchakra is a music festival started by Vijay Ghate and few others. This festival provides a platform for young musicians to perform. Different artists from various genres of music perform at the festival.
