= Suresh Talwalkar =

Indian musician (born 1948)

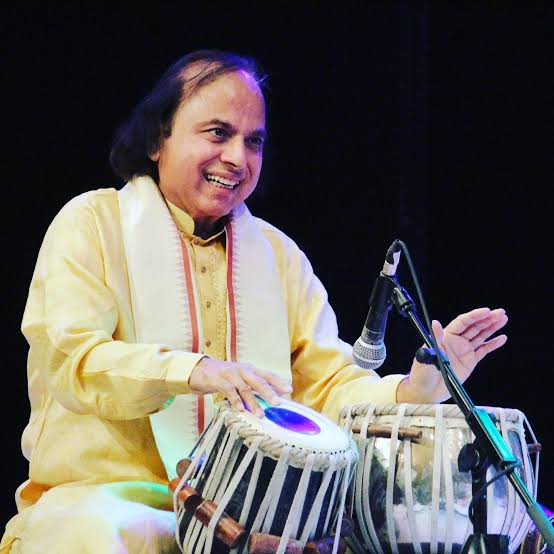
- Suresh Talwalkar playing the Tabla Talwalkar playing the Tabla

Background information
- Born: 20 July 1948 (age 77); Mumbai, Bombay State, India
- Genres: Hindustani classical music
- Instrument: Tabla
- Website: Taalyogi Pandit Suresh Talwalkar

Pandit Suresh Talwalkar (born 1948) is an Indian musician who plays the percussion instrument Tabla.

== Performing career ==
Talwalkar was born in 1948 into a Marathi family in Chembur, Mumbai. He belongs to the Keertankar family of Shri Dholebuva. Keertana being a classical form of devotional and musical discourse, a liking for the classical music was inculcated in him right in the childhood. He initially learned playing the tabla from his father Dattatrey Talwalkar. He was trained under the tutelage of i.e. his gurus were Pandharinath Nageshkar, Vinayakrao Ghangrekar, Gajananbuva Joshi, Nivruttibuva Sarnaik and Ramkrishna Dholebuva (and from many others) and studied the rhythm theory of Carnatic music from Ramnaad Ishvaran.

Talwalkar performing with Ram Narayan in the 1970s

His style draws from several gharanas (stylistic schools) and he accompanied classical musicians and dancers; Talwalkar frequently used to perform with sarangi player Ram Narayan since the late 1960s. He also accompanies classical singer Ulhas Kashalkar. He has toured in the United States, Europe, and Africa. He taught Tabla, Pakhawaj, Western drums, etc. Some of his disciples are Ramdas Palsule, Vijay Ghate, etc. Talwalkar was awarded the All India Radio Award in 1966, the Sangeet Natak Akademi Award in 2004 and Padma Shri in 2013.

== Personal life ==
Talwalkar is married to classical singer Padma Talwalkar. They have a daughter, Savani Talwalkar, who is a tabla player, and a son, Mumbai businessman and tabla player Satyajit Talwalkar.

== Title ==
The title TaalYogi was conferred on Suresh Talwalkar by His Holiness Jagatguru Shankaracharya Shri Vidya Shankar Bharthi, Karveer Peeth, Kolhapur in 2001.

== His Disciples ==
- Vijay Ghate
- Ramdas Palsule
- Vishwanath Shirodkar
- Satyajit Talwalkar (his son)
- Savani Talwalkar (his daughter)
- Supreet Deshpande
- Milind Kulkarni
- Tanmay Deochake
- Aashay Kulkarni
- Mayank Bedekar
- Omkar Dalvi
- Ishan Paranjpe
- Swapnil Bhate
- Gandharva Chumble
- Shripad Godse
- Vighnahari Deo
- Charudatta Phadke
- Ujwol Roy
- Ajinkya Joshi
- Rohit Khawle
- krushna Salunkhe
- Parth Bhumkar
- Bhargav Deshmukh
- Rohit Shrivant
- Vedang joshi
- Jagmita Lingade
- Kautubh Swain
- Ruturaj Hing
- Sarthak Gadge

== Awards ==
- Talwalkar received the Padma Shri in 2013.
- He was awarded the All India Radio Award in 1966
- Andhra Pradesh Government Award in 1998
- ‘Tyagaraj Award’ by Shri Naad Bramha, Chembur in 2002
- Sangeet Natak Akademi Award in 2004, awarded by The President of India A. P. J. Abdul Kalam
- ‘Vishnu Digambar Paluskar’ Award by Gandharva Mahavidyalaya, Pune in 2004
- ‘Ratna Puraskar’ awarded by Swarsadhana, Mumbai in 2008
- ‘Sangeet Poornacharya’ Title Awarded by His Holiness Poornavad Vardhishnu Param pujya Shri Vishnu Maharaj Parnekar in 2008
- ITC Sangeet Research Academy Award, Kolkata, West zone of India in 2009
- Honoured by Swar-Sadhana, Pandharpur in 2009
- Suvarnaratna Life Time Achievement Awards-2019
