= Harsh Narayan =

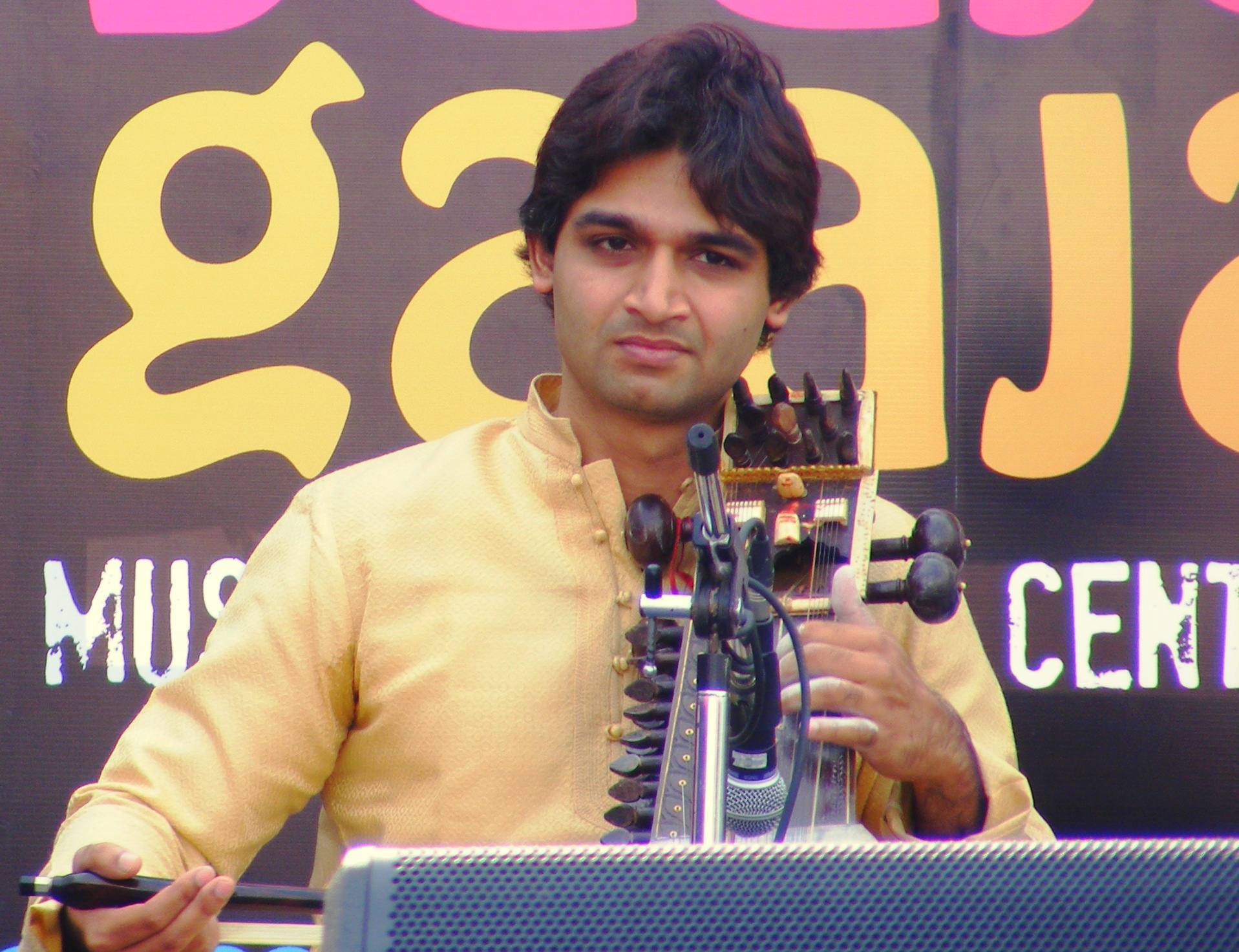
- Narayan at the Baajaa Gaajaa music festival in Pune, 2010

Background information
- Origin: Mumbai, India
- Genres: Hindustani classical music
- Instrument: Sarangi
- Years active: 2002–present
- Labels: Times Music
- Website: harshnarayan.com

Harsh Narayan (Hindi: हर्ष नारायण; ISO: Harṣ Nārāyaṇ) is an Indian sarangi player based in Mumbai, India.

Narayan is a grandson and disciple of sarangi player Ram Narayan. His father is the sarod player Brij Narayan. Narayan performed with Ram Narayan at the 57th Sawai Gandharva music festival.

In 2016, Times Music released his first solo album entitled Scintillating Sarangi featuring the ragas Puriya Dhanashree and Patdeep.

Narayan was awarded the Ustad Bismillah Khan Yuva Puraskar for 2020.

== Discography ==
- Scintillating Sarangi (2016, Times Music)
- Dhanurvadya (2020, Tala Records) with Ty Burhoe
