= Ashique Ali Khan =

Indian musician (1948–1999)

Ustad Ashique Ali Khan
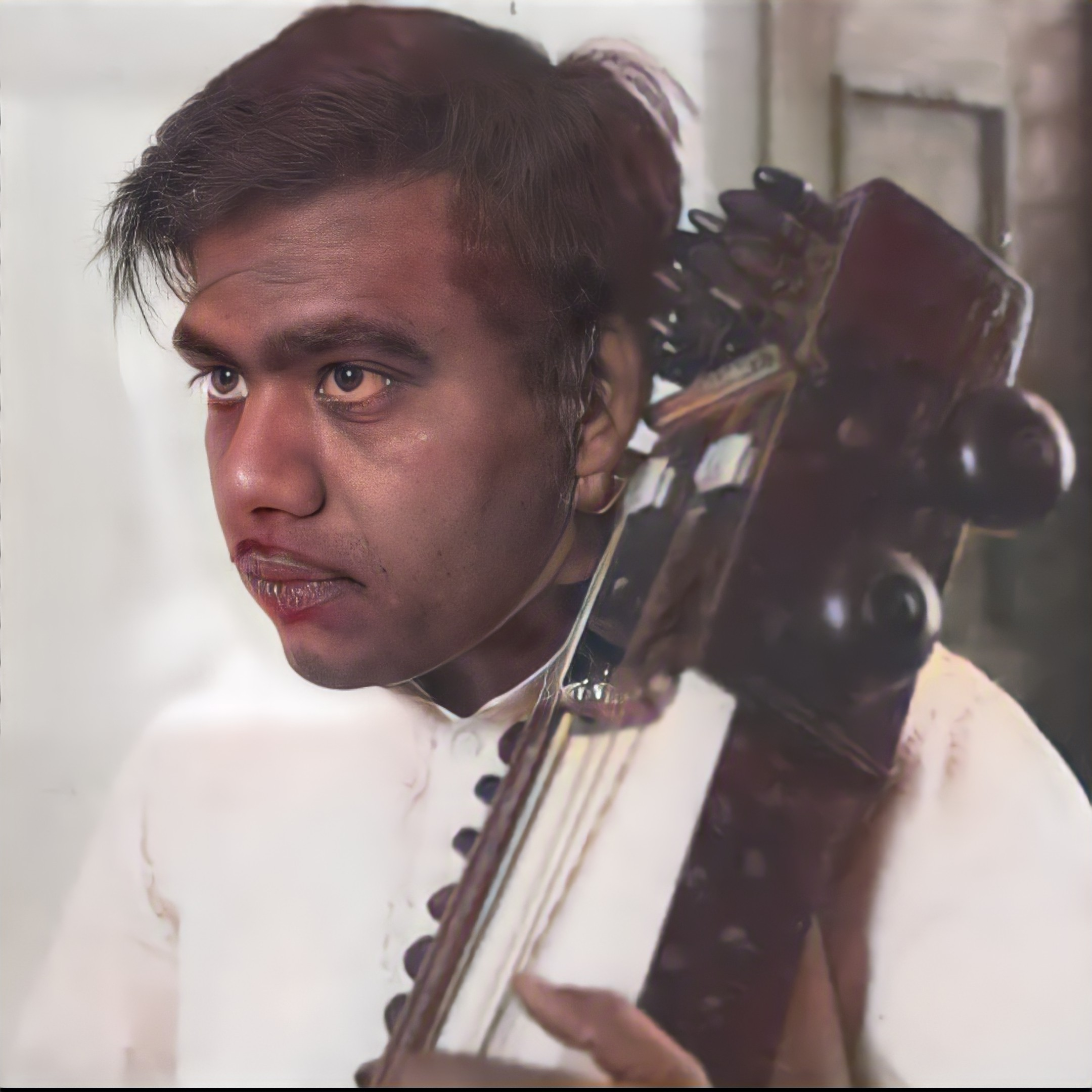

Background information
- Born: 28 October 1948; Kirana, Uttar Pradesh, India
- Died: 1999 (aged 50–51) 29 September 1999 Delhi, India
- Genre: Indian Classical Music
- Occupations: Sarangi Player, Indian Classical Musician

Ustad Ashique Ali Khan (1948–1999) was a Sarangi player, born on 28 October 1948 in Kirana, Uttar Pradesh to a family of Sarangi exponents. He belongs to the Kirana Gharana of Indian Classical Music.

At the age of ten, he attained the first position in vocal music and in playing the harmonium, in a contest organised by Prayag Sangeet Samiti, the Ustad was also drawn towards this rare musical instrument. He began learning the Sarangi at the age of 22. He received his sarangi training first from his grandfather Ustad Allah Rakkha Khan, and later from his father Ustad Mehfooz Ahmed Khan who was also Sarangi player.

In 1993, at Agra his exemplary rendition of lehra while playing in accompaniments to Ustad Zakir Hussain brought him the tabla maestro's untrammeled praise. "It is my great fortune that a supremely accomplished sarangi artist like Ustad Ashique Ali Khan is accompanying me today. I'm like a child compared to him. I am hoping that khan sahib will guide me and help me play to everybody's satisfaction" said Zakir Hussain. After the concert, Hussain went and kissed the fingers of Khan.

On 29 September 1999, Khan died in Delhi at the age of 51.
