= Jaag Utha Insan (1966 film) =

Film from 1966

- Poster
- Directed by: Sheikh Hassan
- Written by: Makhdoom Hassan
- Produced by: Habibur Rehman
- Cinematography: Mehboob Ali
- Music by: Lal Mohammad Iqbal
- Production company: Habib Pictures
- Release date: 20 May 1966
- Country: Pakistan
- Language: Urdu

Jaag Utha Insan is a Pakistani Urdu language film released in 1966.

== Cast ==
- Zeba
- Muhammad Ali
- Waheed Murad
- Firdous Begum
- Ibrahim Nafees
- Kamal Irani
- Seema

== Film songs ==
Song title	Sung by	Lyrics by	Music by	Film notes
Dunya Kisi Kay Pyar Mein Jannat Se Kam Nahin	Mehdi Hassan	Dukhi Premnagri	Lal Mohammad Iqbal	Mehdi Hassan often selected this song to sing in his overseas live concerts and both in Pakistan and India. As a result, this film song became highly popular.
Ankhon Mein Kajal, Hathon Mein Mehndi	Mala Begum	Dukhi Premnagri	Lal Mohammad Iqbal	

== Awards ==
Year	Award	Category	Awardee	Ref.
1966	Nigar Award	Best Editor	Maqsood Hussain	
