= Chatur Lal =

Indian tabla player

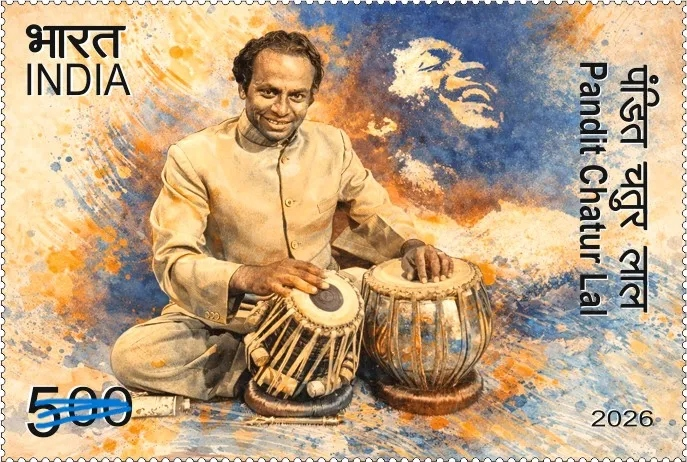
- Chatur Lal on a 2026 stamp of India

Background information
- Born: 16 April 1925; Udaipur, Rajasthan
- Died: 14 October 1965 (aged 40)
- Genres: Indian classical music and world music
- Instrument: Tabla
- Years active: 1949–1965
- Formerly of: Ali Akbar Khan, Ravi Shankar, Charanjit Chatur Lal, Pranshu Chatur Lal, Shruti Chatur Lal, Ram Narayan
- Website: web.archive.org/web/20090618100150/http://www.chaturlaltabla.com/

Chatur Lal (16 April 1925 – 14 October 1965) was an Indian tabla player.

== Career ==
Chatur Lal was born on 16 April 1925 in Udaipur, Rajasthan. He toured with Ravi Shankar, Nikhil Banerjee, Baba Allauddin Khan, Sharan Rani and Ali Akbar Khan in the 1950s and early 1960s and helped popularize the tabla in Western countries and made the nuances of this Indian drum. His younger brother Ram Narayan was a prominent Sarangi player in the second half of the 20th century.

He was the first internationally acclaimed percussionist to introduce Indian classical music with Pandit Ravi Shankar and Ustad Ali Akbar Khan to the West in mid 1950s, when they were invited to perform all over Europe and US for Modern of Museum Art, Rockefeller Centre and Omnibus through Yehudi Menuhin the violinist.

== Death ==
Lal died on 14 October 1965 at the age of 40. His legacy is maintained by the Pandit Chatur Lal Memorial Society and his elder son Charanjit Chatur Lal, his daughter-in-law Meeta Chatur Lal, his granddaughter Shruti Chatur Lal, and his grandson Pranshu Chatur Lal.

== Select discography ==
- India's Master Musician Ravi Shankar, additionally with N. C. Mullick, tamboura. World Pacific Records/Gramophone Company of India/EMI EALP 1283 (1964, first release)
- Chatur Lal / The Drums of India, with accompaniment by Ram Narayan, sarangi. World Pacific Records. WP-1403 (1961)
