= Ram Narayan =

Indian classical sarangi player (1927–2024)

Pandit Ram Narayan Padma Vibhushan
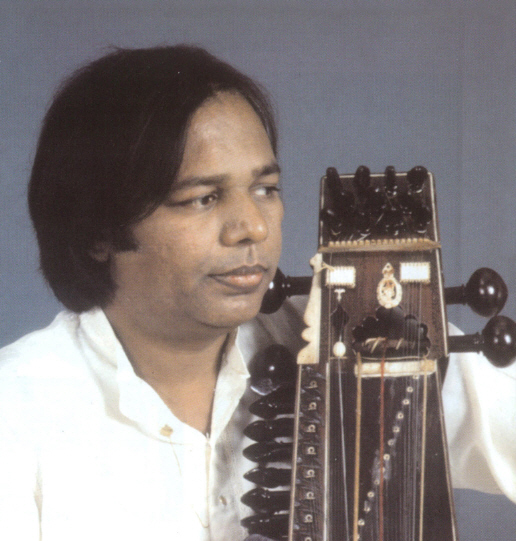
- Narayan in 1974

Background information
- Born: 25 December 1927 near Udaipur, Kingdom of Mewar, British India
- Died: 9 November 2024 (aged 96) Bandra, Mumbai, India
- Genre: Hindustani classical music
- Instrument: Sarangi
- Years active: 1944–2013

Ram Narayan (IPA: [raːm naːˈɾaːjəɳ]; 25 December 1927 – 9 November 2024) often referred to with the title Pandit, was an Indian musician who popularised the bowed instrument sarangi as a solo concert instrument in Hindustani classical music and became the first internationally successful sarangi player.

Narayan was born near Udaipur and learned to play the sarangi at an early age. He studied under sarangi players and singers and, as a teenager, worked as a music teacher and travelling musician. All India Radio in Lahore hired Narayan as an accompanist for vocalists in 1944. Narayan relocated to Delhi following the partition of India in 1947, and moved to Mumbai in 1949 to work in Indian cinema.

Narayan became a concert solo artist in 1956, performing at major music festivals across India. He recorded solo albums and made his first international tour in 1964 to America and Europe with his older brother Chatur Lal, a tabla (hand drum) player who had toured with Ravi Shankar in the 1950s. He was awarded India's second highest civilian honour, the Padma Vibhushan, in 2005.

== Early life ==
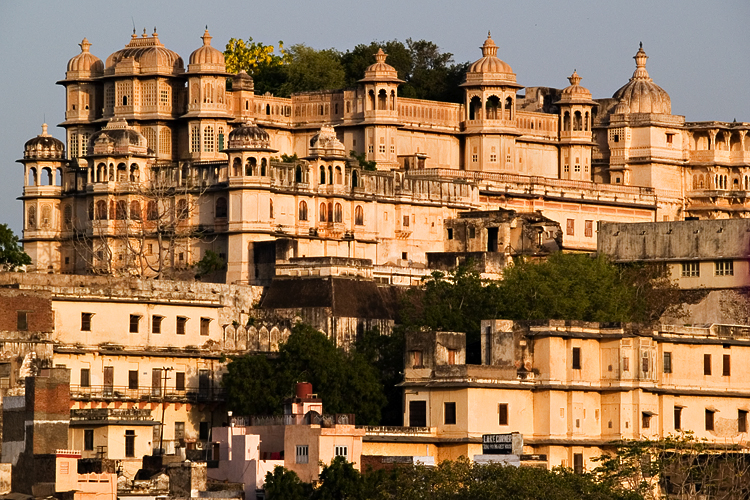
City Palace, Udaipur, where the Maharana of Udaipur held court

Ram Narayan was born on 25 December 1927 in Amber village, near Udaipur in northwestern India. His great-great-grandfather, Bagaji Biyavat, was a singer from Amber, and he and Narayan's great-grandfather, Sagad Danji Biyavat, sang at the court of the Maharana of Udaipur. Narayan's grandfather, Har Lalji Biyavat, and father, Nathuji Biyavat, were farmers and singers, Nathuji played the bowed instrument dilruba, and Narayan's mother was a music lover.

Narayan's first language was Rajasthani and he learned Hindi and, later, English. At the age of six or so he found a small sarangi left by the family's Ganga guru, a genealogist, and was taught a fingering technique developed by his father. Narayan's father taught him, but was worried about the difficulty of playing the sarangi and its association with courtesan music, which gave the instrument a low social status. After a year, Biyavat sought lessons for his son from sarangi player Mehboob Khan of Jaipur, but changed his mind when Khan told him Narayan would have to change his fingering technique. Narayan's father later encouraged him to leave school and devote himself to playing the sarangi.

At about ten years of age, Narayan learned the basics of dhrupad, the oldest genre of Hindustani classical music, by studying and imitating the practice of sarangi player Uday Lal of Udaipur, a student of dhrupad singers Allabande and Zakiruddin Dagar. After Uday Lal died of old age, Narayan met travelling singer Madhav Prasad, originally of Lucknow, who had performed at the court of Maihar. With Prasad, Narayan enacted the ganda bandhan, a traditional ceremony of acceptance between a teacher and his pupil, in which Narayan swore obedience in exchange for being maintained by Prasad.

He served Prasad and was taught in khyal, the predominant genre of Hindustani classical music, but returned to Udaipur after four years to teach music school. Prasad later visited Narayan and convinced him to resign his position and dedicate his time to improvement as a musician, although the idea of giving up a steady career was not well received by Narayan's family. He stayed with Prasad and travelled to several Indian states until Prasad fell ill and advised him to learn from singer Abdul Wahid Khan in Lahore. Following Prasad's death in Lucknow, Narayan enacted the ganda bandhan with another teacher who gave him lessons, but soon left for Lahore and never performed the ritual again.

== Career ==
Narayan travelled to Lahore in 1943 and auditioned for the local All India Radio (AIR) station as a singer, but the station's music producer, Jivan Lal Mattoo, noticed grooves in Narayan's fingernails: sarangis are played by pressing the fingernails sideways against three playing strings, which strains the nails. Mattoo instead employed Narayan as a sarangi player. Traditionally, the sarangi is supposed to play after the singer and imitate the vocal performance, and play in the space between phrases. Mattoo advised Narayan and helped him contact khyal singer Abdul Wahid Khan, a rigorous teacher under whom Narayan learned four ragas through singing lessons. Narayan was allowed sporadic solo performances on AIR and began to consider a solo career.

After the partition of India in 1947, Narayan moved to Delhi and played at the local AIR station. His work for popular singers increased his repertoire and knowledge of styles. Narayan played with the classical singers Omkarnath Thakur, Bade Ghulam Ali Khan, Hirabai Badodekar, and Krishnarao Shankar Pandit, and he accompanied singer Amir Khan in 1948, when Khan sang for the first time at AIR Delhi following the partition. As an accompanist for vocalists, Narayan showed his own talent and came to the foreground. Singers of the city complained that he was not a dependable accompanist and too assertive, but he maintained he wanted to keep vocalists in tune and inspire them in a cordial contest. Other tabla (percussion) players and singers, including Omkarnath Thakur and Krishnarao Shankar Pandit, expressed admiration for Narayan's playing.

Narayan became frustrated with his supporting role for vocalists and moved to Mumbai in 1949 to work independently in film music and recording. He recorded three solo 78 rpm gramophone records for His Master's Voice in 1950 and an early ten-inch LP album in Mumbai in 1951, but the album was not in demand. The Mumbai film industry offered a good salary and obscurity for work that would have lowered his stature among classical musicians. For the next 15 years he played and composed songs for films, including Adalat, Gunga Jumna, Humdard, Kashmir Ki Kali, Madhumati, Milan, Mughal-e-Azam, and Noor Jehan. For "Chalte Chalte" of 1972 film Pakeezah, composer Ghulam Mohammad made Narayan give 21 takes for the desired effect. Narayan was considered a desired choice of film music director O. P. Nayyar.

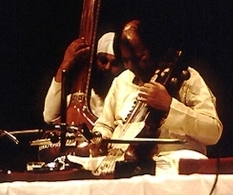
Narayan performing in New Delhi in the late 1980s.

Narayan performed in Afghanistan in 1952 and in China in 1954 and was well received in both countries. His first solo concert at a 1954 music festival in the Cowasji Jehangir Hall, Mumbai, was cut short when an impatient audience, waiting for performances by famous artists, drove him from the stage. Narayan pondered giving up the sarangi and becoming a singer. He later regained confidence, performed solo for smaller crowds, and was favourably received in his second attempt to play solo for a Mumbai music festival in 1956. He has since performed at the major music festivals of India. Narayan later gave up accompaniment; this decision carried a financial risk because interest in solo sarangi was not yet substantial.

After sitar player Ravi Shankar successfully performed in Western countries, Narayan followed his example. He recorded solo albums and made his first international tour in 1964 to America and Europe with his older brother Chatur Lal, a tabla player who had toured with Shankar in the 1950s. The European tour included performances in France and Germany (sponsored by the Goethe-Institut) and at the City of London Festival, England.

Beginning in the 1960s, Narayan often taught and gave concerts outside of India. On his Western tours he encountered interest in the sarangi because of its similarity to the cello and violin. The tabla player Suresh Talwalkar became a frequent accompanist for Narayan in the late 1960s. The music of Ram Narayan and Chatur Lal is featured in the 1965 anti-war film Good Times, Wonderful Times by American filmmaker Lionel Rogosin. Narayan continued to perform and record in India and abroad for the next decades and his recordings appeared on Indian, American, and European labels. During the early 1980s he typically spent months each year visiting Western nations. A 1989 UK performance of Bhairavi was covered by the Kronos Quartet on their 2009 album Floodplain. Narayan performed less frequently in the 2000s and rarely in the 2010s.

== Style ==
Narayan performs the night raga Jog at the Shiraz Arts Festival in Iran in the 1970s.

Narayan's style is characteristic of Hindustani classical music, but his choice of solo instrument and his background of learning from teachers outside his community were not common for the genre. He stated that he aimed to please the audience and create a feeling of harmony, and expected the audience to reciprocate by reacting to his playing.

Narayan's performances were strung together from the meditative and measured alap (non-metrical introduction) and jor (performance with pulse) in dhrupad style, followed by a faster and less reserved gat section (composition with rhythmic pattern provided by the tabla) in khyal style. He experimented with a style of jhala (performance with rapid pulse) developed by Bundu Khan, but considered it more appropriate for plucked instruments and stopped performing it.

The gat section included one or two parts with compositions. When he used two gats, the first one tended to be at a slow or medium tempo, and the second one was faster; the gats were usually performed in the 16-beat rhythmic cycle tintal. Narayan often completed performances with ragas associated with thumri (a popular light classical genre), which are referred to as mishra (Sanskrit: mixed) because they allow for additional notes, or with a dhun (song based on folk music).

Narayan practiced and taught using a limited number of paltas, exercises in a small scale range that are used to prepare playing different numbers of notes per bow. Derived from paltas are lengthy note patterns called tans, which contain characteristic "melodic shapes" and were used by Narayan for fast playing. He used his left (fingering) hand for runs and to play an extended melodic range, and his right (bowing) hand for rhythmic accentuations. Narayan's fingering technique, his low right hand position, keeping the bow in a close to right angle to the string, and his use of the full bow length, were unusual among sarangi players.

Magriel described four stylistic choices by Narayan that deviate from tradition and were not commonly adopted by sarangi players: extended alap without accompaniment, replacing the usual fast section of the alap (jhala) with a set of tans, performing gats influenced by an instrumental playing style while the fixed composition is based on vocal performance, and a fast repetition of scales that expands the sound into the higher and lower register as a stylistic device.

Narayan was associated with the Kirana gharana (stylistic school of Kirana) through Abdul Wahid Khan, but his performance style was not strongly connected to it. Most of Narayan's compositions were from the singing repertoire of his teachers and were modified and adapted to the sarangi. He also created original compositions and in performance varied those he was taught. Narayan did not favor the creation of new ragas, but developed compound ragas, including those of Nand with Kedar and Kafi with Malhar.

Narayan used a sarangi obtained from Uday Lal and built in Meerut in the 1920s or 1930s in his concerts and recordings. He played on foreign harp strings to produce a clearer tone. Narayan experimented with modifications to his instrument and added a fourth string, but removed it because it hindered playing. In the 1940s, he exchanged gut with steel for the first string and found it easier to play, but reverted to using only gut strings because the steel string altered the sound.

== Contributions and recognition ==
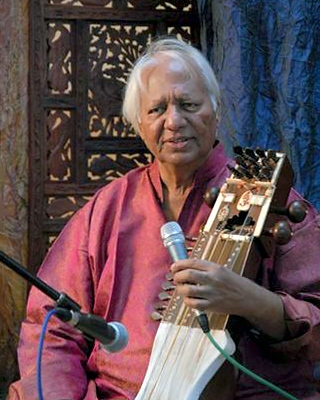
Narayan at Thames Valley University, Slough, England, in May 2007

Narayan increased the status of the sarangi to that of a modern concert solo instrument, made it known outside of India, and was the first sarangi player with international success, an example later followed by Sultan Khan. Narayan's simplified fingering technique allowed for glide (meend) and affected the modern sarangi concert style, as aspects of his playing and tone creation were taken up by sarangi players from Narayan's recordings.

Narayan taught at the American Society for Eastern Arts and the National Centre for the Performing Arts in Mumbai in the 1970s and 1980s, where he gave the first master class for sarangi. Narayan privately trained sarangi players, including his daughter Aruna Narayan, his grandson Harsh Narayan, and Vasanti Srikhande. He also taught sarod players, including his son Brij Narayan, as well as vocalists and a violinist. In 2002, he taught 15 Indian students and more than 500 students in the United States and Europe had studied with him. Indian music in performance: a practical introduction, released in 1980 by Neil Sorrell in cooperation with Narayan, was described as "one of the best presentations on modern North Indian music practice" by Hans Neuhoff in Die Musik in Geschichte und Gegenwart.

My mission was to obliterate the blemish which the sarangi carried due to its social origins. I hope I have succeeded in this.

— Ram Narayan, quoted in The Indian Express

Narayan argued that appreciation of the sarangi and him came only after acknowledgment by the Western audience. He attributed the lack of sarangi students to a lack of competent teachers and said that the Indian government should assist in preserving the instrument. The Pt (Pandit) Ram Narayan Foundation in Mumbai awards scholarships to sarangi students. Narayan has stated he was skeptical the sarangi would survive and said he would never give up promoting the instrument.

Narayan received the national awards Padma Shri in 1976, Padma Bhushan in 1991, and Padma Vibhushan in 2005. The Padma Vibhushan, India's second highest civilian honor, was presented by Indian President A. P. J. Abdul Kalam. Narayan was awarded the Rajasthan Sangeet Natak Akademi Award for 1974–75 and the national Sangeet Natak Akademi Award for 1975, and was made a fellow of the Rajasthan Sangeet Natak Akademi for 1988–89. He received the Kalidas Samman from the Government of Madhya Pradesh for 1991–92 and was presented with the Aditya Vikram Birla Kalashikhar Puraskar in 1999 by P. C. Alexander, governor of Maharashtra. He received the Rajasthan Ratna for 2013, was awarded the Lifetime Achievement Honour – Classical at the 4th Global Indian Music Academy Awards 2014, and was awarded the Pandit Bhimsen Joshi Lifetime Achievement Award for 2015–2016 in the field of classical music by the government of Maharashtra. The biographical film Pandit Ramnarayan – Sarangi Ke Sang was shown at the 2007 International Film Festival of India. A sarangi owned by Narayan is on display in a gallery of musical instruments of the Sri Shanmukhananda Fine Arts & Sangeetha Sabha in Mumbai as of December 2020. He was honored with the Sur Jyotsna National Music Awards "Legend" in 2024

== Personal life ==
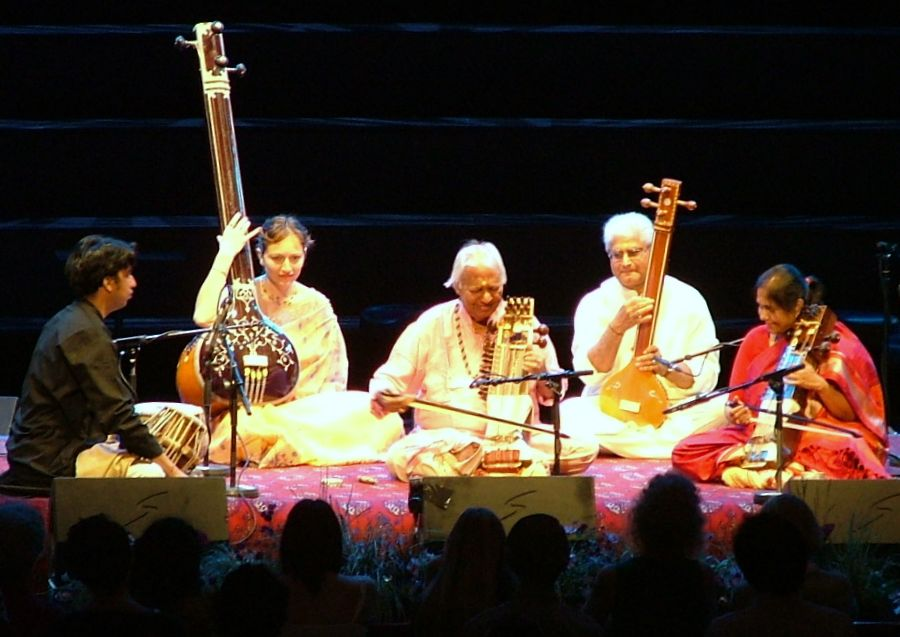
Narayan performing with his daughter Aruna (far right) at the Royal Albert Hall, London, in 2009.

Narayan shared a close relationship with his older brother, Chatur Lal, who learned the tabla primarily to accompany his brother's sarangi playing. Lal studied under tabla teachers in his youth, but later turned to farming. Lal visited Narayan in 1948 in Delhi after Narayan had become a professional sarangi player, and Narayan convinced Lal to work as a tabla player at the local AIR station.

Lal toured with instrumentalists Ravi Shankar and Ali Akbar Khan in the 1950s, and helped popularise the tabla in Western countries. When Lal died in October 1965, Narayan had difficulty performing and struggled with alcoholism, but overcame the addiction after two years. Narayan assisted his brother's four children after their father's death. Chatur Lal's son, Charanjit Lal Biyavat, is a tabla player and has toured Europe with Narayan.

Narayan's wife Sheela, a homemaker, came to Mumbai in the 1950s; they had four children. She died prior to 2001. His oldest son, sarod player Brij Narayan, was born on 25 April 1952 in Udaipur, and his daughter Aruna Narayan was born in 1959 in Mumbai. She was the first woman to give a solo sarangi concert and emigrated to Canada in 1984. Another son, Shiv, who is a year younger than Aruna, learned to play the tabla, and toured Australia with his father. Brij Narayan's son, Harsh Narayan, plays the sarangi. In 2009, Narayan performed at BBC's The Proms in the Royal Albert Hall, London, with Aruna, and he played at the 2010 Sawai Gandharva Music Festival, Pune, with Harsh.

Narayan was a Hindu and had stated "music is my religion", arguing that there was no better access to divinity than music. He died on 9 November 2024, at the age of 96, in his residence in Bandra, Mumbai. His funeral was performed with state honors.

== Writings ==
- Sorrell, Neil; Narayan, Ram (1980). Indian music in performance: a practical introduction. Manchester University Press. ISBN 978-0-7190-0756-9.
- Narayan, Ram (2009). एक सुर मेरा एक सारंगी का [A tune of mine, one of the sarangi] (in Hindi). New Delhi: Kitabghar Prakashan. ISBN 978-81-907221-2-4.
