= Sarangi =

Bowed, short-necked string instrument from South Asia

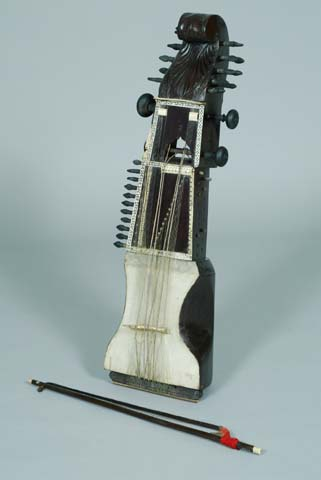
- Classification: Chordophone

Related instruments
- Sarinda; Taus; Dilruba/Esraj; Dhantara; Nepali Sarangi

The sarangi (Hindi: सारङ्गी, Urdu: سارنگی both sāraṅgi pronounced [sɑːraŋgi]) is a bowed, short-necked three-stringed instrument played in traditional South Asian music. It is said to resemble the sound of the human voice through its ability to imitate vocal ornaments such as Gamaks or Gamakam (shakes) and meends (sliding movements). The Nepali sarangi is similar, but is a four-stringed, simpler folk instrument.

== Playing ==
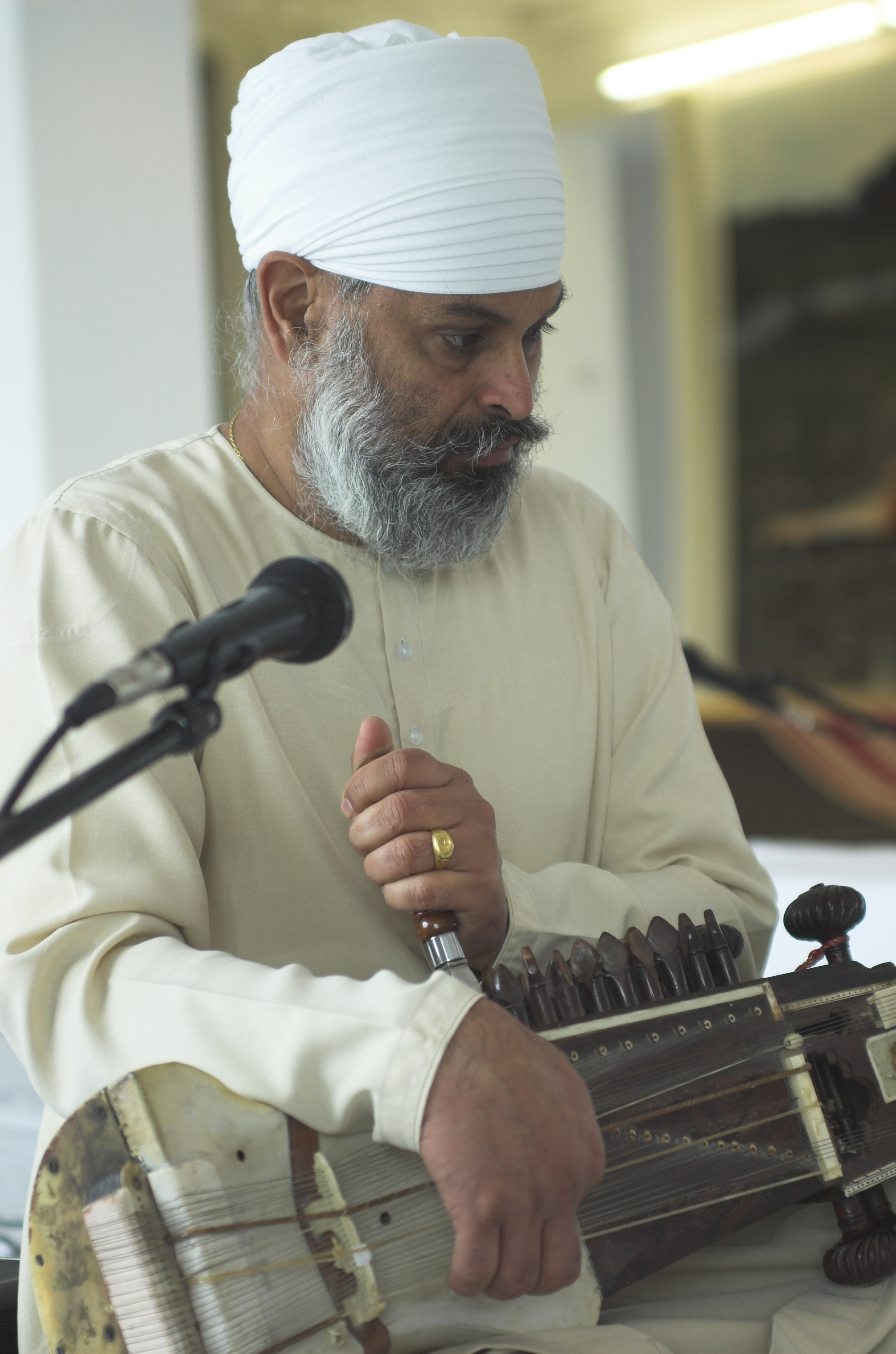
Surjeet Singh tuning his sarangi

The repertoire of sarangi players is traditionally related to vocal music. Nevertheless, a concert with solo sarangi as the main item will sometimes include a full-scale raga presentation with an extensive alap (the unmeasured improvisatory development of the raga) in increasing intensity (alap to jor to jhala) and several compositions in increasing tempo called bandish. As such, it could be seen as being on par with other instrumental styles such as sitar, sarod, and bansuri.

It is rare to find a sarangi player who does not know the words of many classical compositions. The words are usually mentally present during the performance, and a performance almost always adheres to the conventions of vocal performances including the organisational structure, the types of elaboration, the tempo, the relationship between sound and silence, and the presentation of khyal and thumri compositions. The vocal quality of sarangi is in a separate category from, for instance, the so-called gayaki-ang of sitar which attempts to imitate the nuances of khyal while overall conforming to the structures and usually keeping to the gat compositions of instrumental music. (A gat is a composition set to a cyclic rhythm.)

The Nepali sarangi is a traditional stringed musical instrument of Nepal, commonly played by the Gaine or Gandarbha ethnic group; the form and repertoire of the instrument in Nepal is more folk oriented than in India, and it is particularly associated with Gandarbha people.

== Structure ==
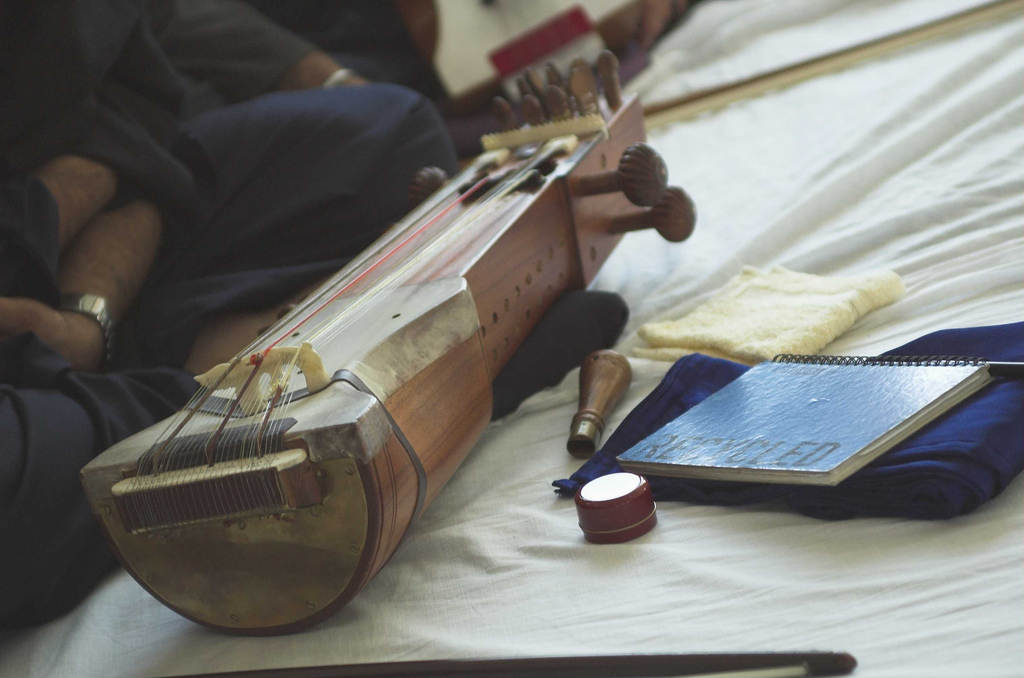
A sarangi laid flat

Carved from a single block of tun (red cedar) wood, the sarangi has a box-like shape with three hollow chambers: pet ('stomach'), chaati ('chest') and magaj ('brain'). It is usually around 2 feet (0.61 m) long and around 6 inches (150 mm) wide, though it can vary as there are smaller as well as larger variants of sarangi as well. The smaller ones are more stable in hand. The lower resonance chamber or pet is covered with parchment made out of goat skin on which a strip of thick leather is placed around the waist (and nailed on the back of the chamber) which supports the elephant-shaped bridge that is usually made of camel or buffalo bone. Originally, this bridge was made of ivory or Barasingha bone, but now rare due to the trade ban in India. The bridge in turn supports the huge pressure of approximately 35–37 sympathetic steel or brass strings and three main gut strings that pass through it.

The three main playing strings, the comparatively thicker gut strings- are bowed with a heavy horsehair bow and stopped not with the fingertips but with the nails, cuticles, and surrounding flesh. Talcum powder is applied to the fingers as a lubricant. The neck has ivory or bone platforms on which the fingers slide. The remaining strings are sympathetic, or tarabs, numbering up to around 35–37, divided into four choirs having two sets of pegs, one on the right and one on the top. On the inside is a chromatically tuned row of 15 tarabs and on the right a diatonic row of nine tarabs each encompassing a full octave, plus one to three extra surrounding notes above or below the octave. Both these sets of tarabs pass from the main bridge to the right side set of pegs through small holes in the chaati supported by hollow ivory/bone beads. Between these inner tarabs and on either side of the main playing strings lie two more sets of longer tarabs, with five to six strings on the right set and six to seven strings on the left set. They pass from the main bridge over to two small, flat, wide, table-like bridges through the additional bridge towards the second peg set on top of the instrument. These are tuned to the important tones (swaras) of the raga. A properly tuned sarangi will hum and cry and will sound like melodious meowing, with tones played on any of the main strings eliciting echo-like resonances. A few sarangis use strings manufactured from goat intestines.

== Decline ==
Around the 20th century, the harmonium and violin began to be used as alternatives to the sarangi due to their comparative ease of handling. In Pakistan specifically, since the 1980s, the decline in sarangi playing has also been attributed to the deaths of several masters (in the larger context of the relationship between Islam and music) and religious radicalization under the reign of Zia-ul-Haq.

== Notable performers ==
=== Sarangi players in India ===
- Abdul Latif Khan (1934–2002)
- Aruna Narayan (born 1959)
- Ashique Ali Khan (1948–1999)
- Bharat Bhushan Goswami (b. 1955)
- Bundu Khan (1880–1955)
- Dhruba Ghosh (1957–2017)
- Ghulam Ali (Sarangi) (b. 1975)
- Harsh Narayan (b. 1985)
- Manonmani (b. 2000)
- Ramesh Mishra (1948–2017)
- Ram Narayan (b. 1927-2024)
- Sabir Khan (Sarangi) (b. 1978)
- Sabri Khan (1927–2015)
- Siddiqui Ahmed Khan (1914–)
- Suhail Yusuf Khan (b. 1988)
- Sultan Khan (1940–2011)
- Ustad Faiyaz Khan (born 1968)
- Moinuddin Khan (musician) (died 2015)

=== Sarangi players in Pakistan ===
- Allah Rakha (1932–2000)
- Bundu Khan (1880–1955)
- Nathu Khan (1920–1971)

=== Other sarangi players ===
- Yuji Nakagawa, Sarangi – a Japanese citizen who learnt to play the instrument in India under the tutelage of Dhruba Ghosh

== See also ==
- Esraj
- Sarinda
- Hindustani music
