= Jon C. Aster =

American pathologist

- Born: Ann Arbor, Michigan
- Citizenship: US
- Education: University of Michigan
- Partner: Erin Malone
- Children: 2
- Scientific career
- Fields: Pathology
- Institutions: Harvard Medical School

Jon Christopher Aster is an American pathologist who researches the role of the notch signaling pathway in leukemia. He is the Michael Gimbrone Professor of Pathology at Harvard Medical School. He was a co-editor of the Annual Review of Pathology: Mechanisms of Disease from 2016-2025.

== Early life and education ==
Jon Christopher Aster was born in Ann Arbor, Michigan as the eldest child born to his parents. His father, Richard Aster, is a physician and medical researcher. His parents divorced when he was eleven, and he moved with his mother to Boston. He attended the University of Michigan (UM), where he was initially interested in pursuing a meteorology degree but later switched to microbiology. After graduating, his father recommended that he worked for George Brewer, a faculty member in UM's department of human genetics, while he determined his career path. Aster worked in Brewer's lab for a year before re-enrolling as a doctoral student at UM. He graduated in 1987 with a PhD and Doctor of Medicine in human genetics. For his doctoral research he studied the physiology of red blood cells.

== Career ==
Aster began his medical residency at Brigham and Women's Hospital in Boston in 1987, finishing a hematopathology fellowship in 1990 and a molecular oncology fellowship in 1993. In 1996 he became an assistant professor of pathology at Harvard Medical School; he was promoted to associate professor in 2000. he currently works there as the Michael Gimbrone Professor of Pathology. Much of his research has focused on the Notch signaling pathway and its role in leukemia. He was a co-editor of the Annual Review of Pathology: Mechanisms of Disease from 2016-2025. He has co-authored several pathology books along with Dr. Vinay Kumar (pathologist) and Dr. Abul K. Abbas.

== Personal life ==
Aster enjoys golfing and has competed in many father/son golfing tournaments with his father Richard. He is married to Erin Malone and has two children.
