= Nath (disambiguation) =

The Naths are a tradition within Hinduism.

Nath may also refer to:

- Nath (surname) (including a list of people with the name)
- Nose-jewel, known as nath in some languages of India
- Nath Bank, a former bank of British India
- Sai Nath, a popular guru from India

== See also ==
- El Nath (disambiguation)
- Nath Í (disambiguation), several Irish people with the name
