= Debnath =

Debnath (sometimes Nath) is a Bengali surname. The individuals with this surname mainly belong to the Yogi-Nath or Jugi caste group which is listed as Other Backward Class in West Bengal. Prior to independence, census statistics rarely included the caste name Debnath or Nath. 19th-century British sources mentioned that castes known as jogis or jugis existed in Bengal, Punjab and Rajputana. The Naths, however, were one of the six subgroups of Jogi in the Rajasthan Hindi census. Some sources claim that Jogis held a low position during the 19th century. They appear to be particularly linked to failed ascetics and weavers who are often of lower status. In Assam, Yogi(nath) were historically known for drumming, now agriculture is their main occupation. In the state of Himachal Pradesh they are classified as Scheduled Caste under India's Reservation system.

== Notable people ==
- Arup Debnath (born 1987), Indian football goalkeeper
- Ishan Debnath (born 1991), Indian footballer
- Jayanta Debnath (born 1971), American pathologist
- Kingshuk Debnath (born 1985), Indian footballer
- Lokenath Debnath (1935–2023), Indian-American mathematician
- Narayan Debnath (born 1950), Indian comics artist
- Pritam Debnath (born 1987), Indian cricketer
- Samapika Debnath, Indian actress and model
- Somen Debnath (born 1983), Indian activist
- Sajit Chandra Debnath (born 1982) Bangladeshi-Japanese academic
