= Geraldine Pinkus =

American pathologist

- Born: Geraldine Sowinski
- Occupation: Pathologist

Academic background
- Education: University of Pittsburgh; Peter Bent Brigham Hospital

Academic work
- Discipline: Pathology
- Sub-discipline: Hematopathology; immunohistochemistry
- Institutions: Peter Bent Brigham Hospital; Dana–Farber Cancer Institute

Geraldine Sowinski Pinkus is an American pathologist who serves as Director of Hematopathology at Brigham and Women's Hospital. She is also Professor of Pathology at Harvard Medical School.

== Biography ==
Geraldine Sowinski Pinkus was born to Loretta (née Kowalski) and Stephen Sowinski. She graduated from Har-Brack High School in 1957.

Pinkus later attended the University of Pittsburgh where she obtained several student awards and eventually a Bachelor of Science in Chemistry in 1961. After obtaining her medical degree at the University's School of Medicine, she spent an internship in internal medicine at UPMC Montefiore and a residency in pathology at UPMC Presbyterian (1966-1968). In 1968, she relocated to Massachusetts for a second residency at Peter Bent Brigham Hospital. In 1970, she completed her residency and received American Board of Pathology certifications in clinical and anatomic pathology.

Pinkus later became the hospital's chief resident and eventually the director of Dana–Farber Cancer Institute's Hematopathology Division and Hematopathology Service. She also became Professor of Pathology at Harvard Medical School.

As an academic, Pinkus specializes in hematopathology and immunohistochemistry. Among her accomplishments include a new tissue marker detection method and a study on keratin proteins in epithelium.
