= Kojo Seys John Elenitoba-Johnson =

American pathologist

- Born: Lagos
- Education: University of Lagos
- Spouse: Megan So-Young Lim
- Scientific career
- Fields: Pathology
- Workplaces: Memorial Sloan Kettering Cancer Center; University of Michigan; Brown University; University of Utah

Kojo Seys John Elenitoba-Johnson is a Nigerian-American pathologist who works at the Memorial Sloan Kettering Cancer Center. His research considers the role of genomic alteration in the pathogenesis of lymphoma. He was elected to the National Academy of Medicine in 2023, and awarded the William L. Gerald Award in 2019.

== Early life and education ==
Elenitoba-Johnson was born in Lagos. He became interested in science as a child, and was particularly excited by human biology. He eventually studied medicine in Nigeria, where he discovered the science of pathology.

After earning his medical degree, he moved to Brown University. At the time, researchers were starting to understand immunology and molecular pathology. There was increased awareness that cancer was a genetic disorder. He was one of the first physicians to be certified in molecular pathology by the American Board of Pathology. He was awarded the American Society for Investigative Pathology Emerging Investigator Award in 2012, which allowed him to focus on translation pathology.

== Research and career ==
Elenitoba-Johnson has held positions at the University of Utah, University of Michigan and University of Pennsylvania. He joined the Memorial Sloan Kettering Cancer Center in 2022. He investigates hematolymphoid neoplasms, using whole genome sequencing and mass spectrometry to explore how structural alterations impact disease progression. By understanding the molecular events that underpin the pathogenesis of lymphoma, Elenitoba-Johnson hopes to identify new therapeutic targets for specific subtypes.

In 2019, Elenitoba-Johnson was awarded the William L. Gerald Award in recognition of his outstanding contributions to tumor pathology. In 2023, he was elected to the National Academy of Medicine.

== Selected publications ==
- Noah A Brown; Larissa V Furtado; Bryan L Betz; Mark J Kiel; Helmut C Weigelin; Megan S Lim; Kojo Elenitoba-Johnson (2014). "High prevalence of somatic MAP2K1 mutations in BRAF V600E-negative Langerhans cell histiocytosis". Blood. 124 (10): 1655–1658. doi:10.1182/blood-2014-05-577361. PMID 24982505. Wikidata Q54200198.
- Carl T. Wittwer; Mark G. Herrmann; Cameron N. Gundry; Kojo S.J. Elenitoba-Johnson (2001). "Real-time multiplex PCR assays". Methods. 25 (4): 430–442. doi:10.1006/meth.2001.1265. PMID 11846612. Wikidata Q34532460.
- van Rhee, Frits; Peter Voorhees; Angela Dispenzieri; et al. (2018). "International, evidence-based consensus treatment guidelines for idiopathic multicentric Castleman disease". Blood. 132 (20): 2115–2124. doi:10.1182/blood-2018-07-862334. PMC 6238190. PMID 30181172. Wikidata Q57161074.

== Personal life ==
Elenitoba-Johnson and his wife, hemopathologist Megan So-Young Lim, run a lab together at the Memorial Sloan Kettering Cancer Center.
