= Ammasi Periasamy =

Indian American biophysicist and academic

- Education: University of Madras; IIT Madras
- Scientific career
- Workplaces: University of Washington; University of Virginia
- Thesis: Molecular imaging : FRET microscopy and spectroscopy (1984)

Ammasi Periasamy is an Indian American biophysicist who is a professor at the University of Virginia. He works on light microscopy, including the molecular imaging of living cells. He has developed a range of imaging systems, including confocal, multi-photon and fluorescence-lifetime imaging microscopy base devices.

== Early life and education ==
Periasamy was born in India. He trained at the University of Madras and the Indian Institute of Technology Madras. After earning his doctorate in 1984, Periasamy moved to the University of Washington for a postdoctoral research position.

== Research and career ==
Periasamy founded the W. M. Keck Centre for Cellular Imaging. His research considers the development of microscopy for imaging of living cells. He has designed various advanced modalities, including multi-photon and confocal approaches. In particular, Periasamy is interested in understanding protein-protein interactions and the monitoring of physical parameters in cancer cells. Periasamy was one of the first researchers to demonstrate fluorescence-lifetime imaging microscopy (FLIM) and fluorescence lifetime redox ratio (FLIRR).

== Selected publications ==
- Rajesh Babu Sekar; Ammasi Periasamy (2003). "Fluorescence resonance energy transfer (FRET) microscopy imaging of live cell protein localizations". Journal of Cell Biology. 160 (5): 629–633. doi:10.1083/jcb.200210140. PMC 2173363. PMID 12615908. Wikidata Q24673219.
- Horst Wallrabe; Ammasi Periasamy (2005). "Imaging protein molecules using FRET and FLIM microscopy". Current Opinion in Biotechnology. 16 (1): 19–27. doi:10.1016/j.copbio.2004.12.002. PMID 15722011. Wikidata Q30435991.
- Masilamani Elangovan; Horst Wallrabe; Ye Chen; Richard N Day; Barroso, Margarida; Ammasi Periasamy (2003). "Characterization of one- and two-photon excitation fluorescence resonance energy transfer microscopy". Methods. 29 (1): 58–73. doi:10.1016/s1046-2023(02)00283-9. PMID 12543072. Wikidata Q33185799.
