= DCLS =

DCLS may refer to:

- Direct Current Level Shift, a modulation type in the IRIG timecode system
- Dauphin County Library System, in Dauphin County, Pennsylvania
- Doctor of Clinical Laboratory Science, The DCLS is an advanced professional doctorate designed for practicing CLSs who wish to further their level of clinical expertise and to develop leadership and management skills
