= Annual Review of Pathology: Mechanisms of Disease =

- Discipline: Pathology
- Language: English
- Edited by: Kathleen H. Burns, Mel B. Feany, and Jayanta Debnath

Publication details
- History: 2006–present, 20 years old
- Publisher: Annual Reviews (US)
- Frequency: Annually
- Open access: Subscribe to Open
- Impact factor: 34.5 (2025)

Standard abbreviations
- ISO 4: Annu. Rev. Pathol.

Indexing
- ISSN: 1553-4006 (print); 1553-4014 (web)
- OCLC no.: 645352270

Links
- Journal homepage

The Annual Review of Pathology: Mechanisms of Disease is a peer-reviewed academic journal that publishes an annual volume of review articles relevant to pathology. It was established in 2006 and is published by Annual Reviews (AR). Its co-editors have been Kathleen H. Burns, Mel B. Feany, and Jayanta Debnath as of 2025. As of 2023, Annual Review of Pathology: Mechanisms of Disease is being published as open access, under the Subscribe to Open model. As of 2026, Journal Citation Reports gives the journal a 2025 impact factor of 34.5, ranking it first of 89 journal titles in the category "Pathology".

== History ==
The Annual Review of Pathology: Mechanisms of Disease was first published in 2006 by Annual Reviews (AR), a nonprofit organization whose stated mission is to synthesize knowledge "for the progress of science and the benefit of society." The editorial goals for the journal were to cover recent advancements in the study of disease mechanism and present new analytical methodologies for pathology. Its first co-editors were Abul K. Abbas, James R. Downing, and Vinay Kumar. Though it was initially in publication with a print volume, it is now only published electronically.

== Scope and indexing ==
The Annual Review of Pathology: Mechanisms of Disease defines its scope as covering significant developments in research on the initiation and progression of human disease. It is abstracted and indexed in Scopus, Science Citation Index Expanded, EMBASE, MEDLINE, and Academic Search, among others.

== Editorial processes ==
The Annual Review of Pathology: Mechanisms of Disease is helmed by the editor or the co-editors. The editor is assisted by the editorial committee, which includes associate editors, regular members, and occasionally guest editors. Guest members participate at the invitation of the editor, and serve terms of one year. All other members of the editorial committee are appointed by the AR board of directors and serve five-year terms. The editorial committee determines which topics should be included in each volume and solicits reviews from qualified authors. Unsolicited manuscripts are not accepted. Peer review of accepted manuscripts is undertaken by the editorial committee.

=== Editors of volumes ===
Dates indicate publication years in which someone was credited as a lead editor or co-editor of a journal volume. The planning process for a volume begins well before the volume appears, so appointment to the position of lead editor generally occurred prior to the first year shown here. An editor who has retired or died may be credited as a lead editor of a volume that they helped to plan, even if it is published after their retirement or death.

- Abul K. Abbas, James R. Downing, and Vinay Kumar (2006)
- Abbas, Stephen J. Galli, and Peter M. Howley (2007–2015)
- Abbas, Galli, and Jon C. Aster (2016-2018)
- Abbas, Aster, and Mel B. Feany (2019–2020)
- Aster and Feany (2021)
- Aster, Feany, and Jayanta Debnath (2025)
- Kathleen H. Burns, Feany, and Debnath (2025–present)

=== Current editorial board ===
As of 2025, the editorial committee consists of the three co-editors and the following members:

- Jon C. Aster
- Elías Campo
- Stephanie C. Eisenbarth
- Kojo S.J. Elenitoba-Johnson
- Karen M. Frank
- Frederick Klauschen
- Tamara Lotan
- Satdarshan P. Monga
- Nima Mosammaparast

== See also ==
- Annual Review of Genomics and Human Genetics
- Annual Review of Medicine
- Annual Review of Neuroscience
