= James R. Downing =

American physician and executive

- Born: Detroit, Michigan
- Citizenship: US
- Education: University of Michigan–Dearborn; University of Michigan (MD)
- Partner: Mariea Downing
- Children: 3
- Scientific career
- Workplaces: St. Jude Children's Research Hospital

James R. Downing is an American clinical executive. He is the president and chief executive officer of St. Jude Children's Research Hospital.

== Early life and education ==
James R. Downing was born to Lillian and Robert W. Downing and grew up in Detroit, Michigan with five siblings. Downing enjoyed playing football and baseball while he attended Aquinas High School, and initially hoped to play baseball professionally. He received his bachelor's degree from the University of Michigan-Dearborn, where he initially majored in engineering before switching to biochemistry. He attended the University of Michigan to earn a Doctor of Medicine in 1981.

== Career ==
Following his Doctor of Medicine, Downing completed a 2-year medical residency in anatomic pathology, working at Barnes Hospital and The Jewish Hospital of St. Louis at Washington University in St. Louis. In 1984, he completed a fellowship in hematopathology at the University of Florida before joining the faculty of the University of Alabama in Birmingham.

In 1986, Downing was recruited by hematopathologist Coston W. Berard and began working at the St. Jude Children's Research Hospital with Charles J. Sherr. He became Chairman of the Department of Pathology and Laboratory Medicine in 1997 and Deputy Director in 2011. On July 15, 2014, Downing became the Chief Executive Officer of St. Jude, making him the sixth person to hold the position.

Downing was one of the inaugural co-editors of the Annual Review of Pathology: Mechanisms of Disease, though he only held the position for the first volume in 2006. He has also served on the editorial boards of Cancer Discovery, Cancer Cell, and Oncogene.

== Research ==
Downing has studied the molecular basis underlying pediatric leukemia, leading to significant discoveries in hematopathology and molecular biology. He pioneered the use of genomic profiling in the collection of big data for children suffering from blood cancers, exploring the genetics and genomics underlying acute lymphocytic leukemia, acute myeloblastic leukemia, and other cancers, and using that information to improve patient outcomes.

In 2010, Downing launched the Pediatric Cancer Genome Project in an effort to determine the genetic lesions that underlie childhood cancers. By 2013, the project had sequenced the genomes of over 700 pediatric cancer patients and 21 different types of cancer. Next, the Clinical Genomics Project focused on using the PCGP findings to improve diagnostic and clinical treatment for St. Jude patients in "Phase II” of the project. By 2020, St Jude's had sequenced the exome and transcriptome of another 1,200 patients, identifying a total of 23 types of cancer. Among their discoveries were genomic differences between cancers in children and adults, and the finding that about 10% of children with cancer display mutations in known cancer-predisposition genes.

In 2018, Downing led St. Jude Children’s Research Hospital in partnering with the World Health Organization to create the first WHO Collaborating Centre for Childhood Cancer and start a Global Initiative for Childhood Cancer, working with over 50 governments worldwide. In December 2021, they announced the Global Platform for Access to Childhood Cancer Medicines, to increase access to cancer medicines for the nearly 90% of children with cancer who live in low and middle income countries (LMICs). The project will provide medicines to countries at no cost during the pilot phase.

== Awards honors ==
- 1998, Member, American Society for Clinical Investigation
- 2003. Member, Association of American Physicians
- 2003, Member, American Association for the Advancement of Science.
- 2005, Philip Levine Award for Outstanding Research, American Society for Clinical Pathology
- 2012, Award for Excellence in Molecular Diagnostics, Association for Molecular Pathology
- 2013, Member, Institute of Medicine (now the National Academy of Medicine)
- 2016, Member, American Academy of Arts and Sciences
- 2017, Society of Memorial Sloan Kettering Prize,
- 2017, E. Donnall Thomas Lecture and Prize, American Society of Hematology.
- 2019, Pediatric Oncology Award, American Society of Clinical Oncology
- 2020, Inaugural AACR-St. Baldrick’s Foundation Award for Outstanding Achievement in Pediatric Cancer Research, American Association for Cancer Research
- 2022, Fellow of the American Association for Cancer Research in recognition of his contributions to the Pediatric Cancer Genome Project.

== Personal life ==
James R. Downing is married to Mariea Downing; the couple has three children and six grandchildren.
