= Nath (surname) =

Nath is an Indian surname, commonly found among Bengali Hindus and Assamese Hindus. They belong to the Yogi-Nath or Jugi group and are listed as Other Backward Class in West Bengal. Prior to independence, census statistics rarely included the caste name Nath. 19th-century British sources mentioned that castes known as jogis or jugis existed in Bengal, Punjab and Rajputana. The Naths, however, were one of the six subgroups of Jogi in the Rajasthan Hindi census. Some sources claim that Jogis held a low position during the 19th century. They appear to be particularly linked to failed ascetics and weavers who are often of lower status. In Assam, Yogi (nath) were historically known for drumming, now agriculture is their main occupation. In the state of Himachal Pradesh they are classified as Scheduled Caste under India's Reservation system.

== Notable people ==
- Alka Nath (born 1950), Indian politician
- Alok Nath (born 1956), Indian actor
- Akshdeep Nath (born 1993), Indian cricketer
- Aman Nath (born 1951), Indian writer, hotelier, and architectural restorer
- Avindra Nath (born 1958), Canadian physician-scientist
- Baba Mast Nath (1764–?), Hindu saint
- Bhaskar Nath (born 1984), Indian classical instrumentalist
- Bijoy Nath, Indian cricketer
- Chuon Nath (1883–1969), Cambodian Monk
- David Nath, British television documentary producer and director
- Dhiraj Kumar Nath (1945–2018), Bangladeshi diplomat
- Digvijay Nath (1894–1969), Indian priest
- Dilip Nath (born 1997), Nepalese cricketer
- Jag Mohan Nath, an officer in the Indian Air Force
- K. Nath (born 1945), Indian writer
- Kamal Nath (born 1946), Indian politician
- Karan Nath, Hindi film actor
- Kartar Nath (born 1969), Indian cricketer
- Lalit Chandra Nath (1923–2013), Indian folk dancer
- Lalit Mohan Nath (1935–2016), Bangladeshi nuclear physicist
- Latika Nath, Indian author, photographer and wildlife conservationist
- Mahant Chandnath (1956–2017), Indian politician
- Manoranjan Nath, Indian politician belonging to Communist Party of India (Marxist)
- Manoshi Nath, Indian costume designer
- Michael Nath, British writer and academic
- Nakul Nath (born 1974), Indian politician from the National Congress
- Narender Nath (born 1945), Indian politician from the National Congress
- Narendra Nath (1935–1998), Indian actor
- Nath Pai (1922–1971), Indian freedom fighter, barrister and Member of Parliament from the Praja Socialist Party
- Prem Nath (1916–1992), Indian actor
- Pandit Pran Nath, Indian musician
- Pankaj Nath (born 1966), Bangladesh Awami League politician
- Pran Nath (born 1939), theoretical physicist
- Rahul Nath, Indian actor, choreographer and director
- Raja Dina Nath (1795–1857), Finance Minister in the Punjab Empire
- Rajendra Nath (1932–2008), Nepalese comedian
- Ram Nath (born 1933), Indian historian
- Ratan Lal Nath (born 1995), Indian Politician from Tripura
- Reema Rakesh Nath, Indian film writer
- Ripon Nath, Bangladeshi audio engineer
- Rumi Nath, Indian politician from the National Congress
- Samarendra Nath (born 1941), Indian cricketer
- Samarjit Nath (born 1981), Indian cricketer
- Sandeep Nath, Indian lyricist, screenwriter
- Sankar Kumar Nath (born 1960), Indian geophysicist
- Shambhu Nath (born 1928), Indian politician from the National Congress
- Sunil Nath, member of the United Liberation Front of Assam
- Vann Nath (1946–2011), Cambodian painter
- Vijay Nath, Fijian politician
- Vikram Nath (born 1962), Indian judge

== See also ==
- Debnath
