= Haemos =

Haemos is an alternative spelling of:

- King Haemus, in Greek mythology
- Haemus Mons (Mount Haemos) in the Balkans

It may also be the plural of haemo.
