= Nahi =

Nahi or NAHI may refer to:

- Nath Í (disambiguation), an Irish personal name given to two early Irish saints and a legendary king of Connacht
- Non accidental head injury, a constellation of medical findings

== See also ==
- Nakhi, an ethnic group inhabiting the foothills of the Himalayas, China
- Nahiyah or nahia, a regional or local type of administrative division
