= El Nath =

El Nath or Al Nath, may refer to:

- Alpha Arietis, a star
- Beta Tauri, a star
- El-Nath, a town in the popular MMORPG, MapleStory

== See also ==
- Nath (disambiguation)
