= Purshotam Lal =

Indian cardiologist

Dr (Prof.)Purshotam Lal
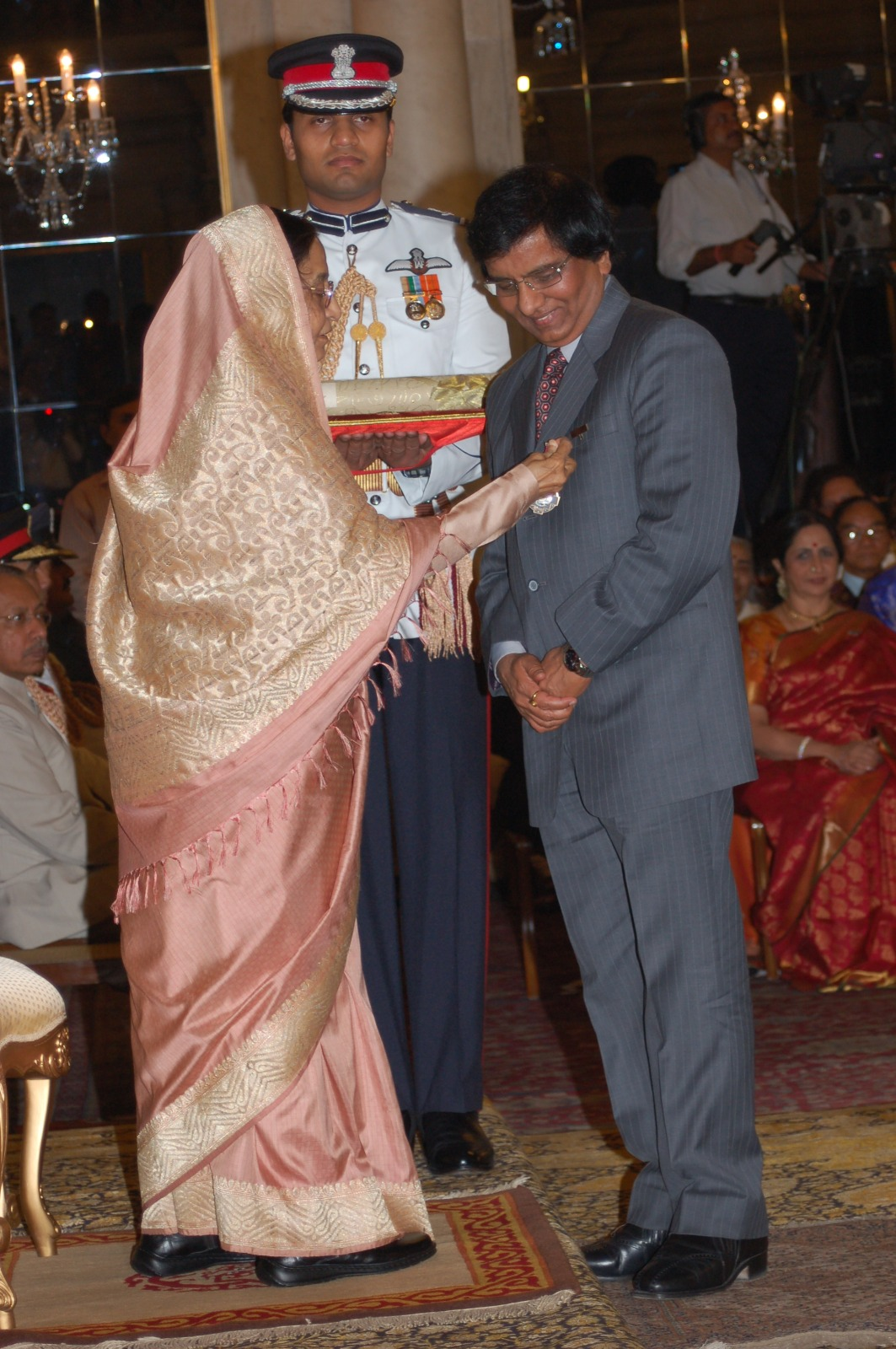
- Dr. Lal receiving the Padma Vibhushan Award in 2009 from the President of India
- Born: 1954 (age 71–72); Moga, Punjab
- Education: Government Medical College, Amritsar
- Occupation: Cardiologist
- Known for: Interventional Cardiology

Dr (Prof.) Purshotam Lal is an Indian Interventional cardiologist known for pioneering over 20 interventional cardiology procedures in India, some of which were also performed for the first time globally. He has received training in the United Kingdom, the United States, and Germany, and has held various academic positions, including as a professor and advisor.

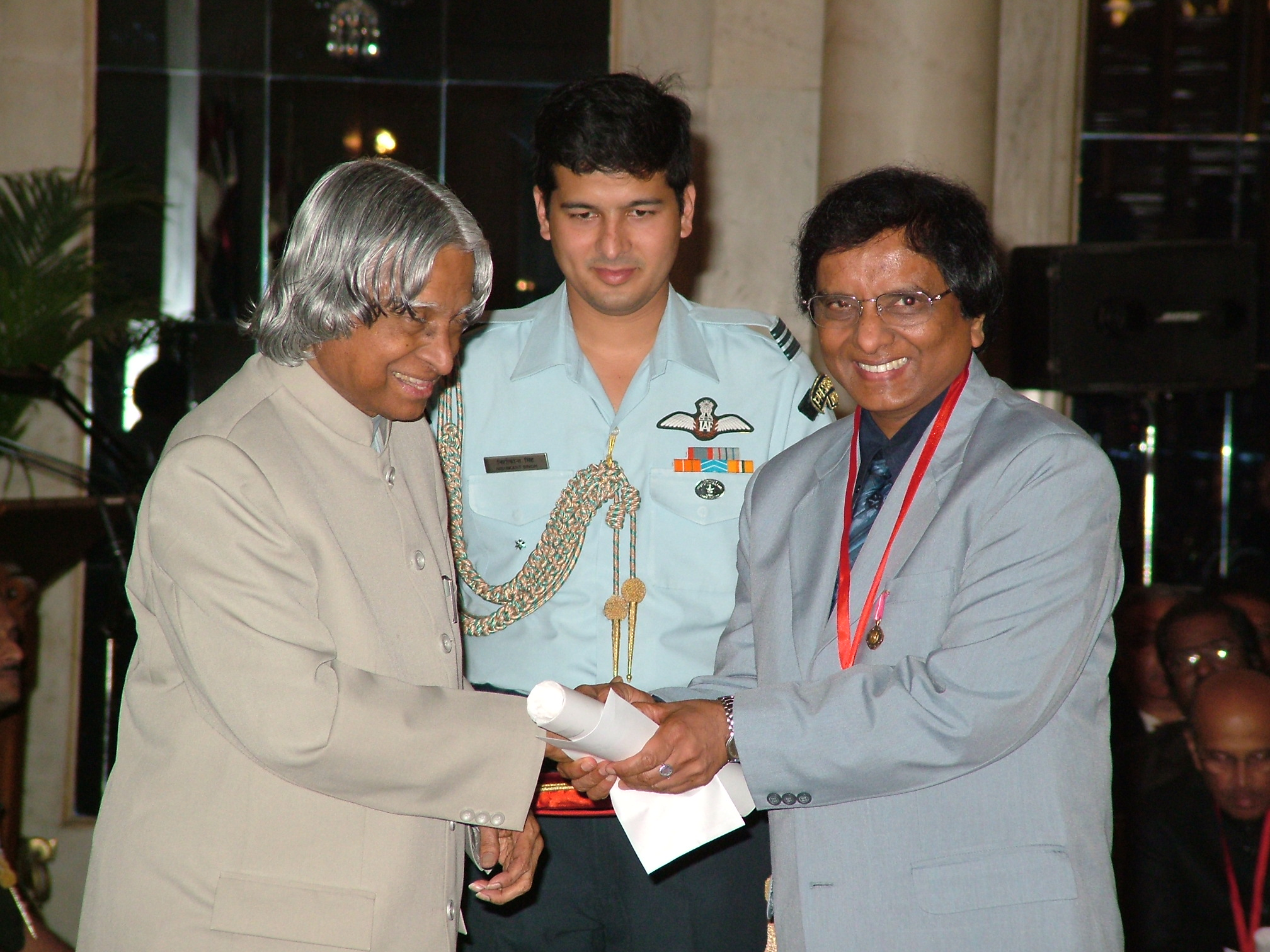
Lal receiving Dr B C Roy National Award by President of India in 2004

He has the unique distinction of pioneering the highest number of procedures in the field of interventional cardiology for the first time in the country, such as Slow Rotational Angioplasty, atherectomy, rot ablation, stenting, heart hole closure (ASD Closure), etc. He has developed his own techniques for aortofemoral bypass support (partial artificial heart) and the opening of tight heart valves using echocardiography without a cath lab. He performed world's first non-surgical aortic valve replacement using Core Valve. He has been invited by countries such as Italy, Germany and China to present the first care of Transcatheter Aortic Valve Implantation (TAVI) using the COREVALVE. Additionally, he introduced Inuoe Balloon Mitral Valvuloplasty in the country and was the first investigator.

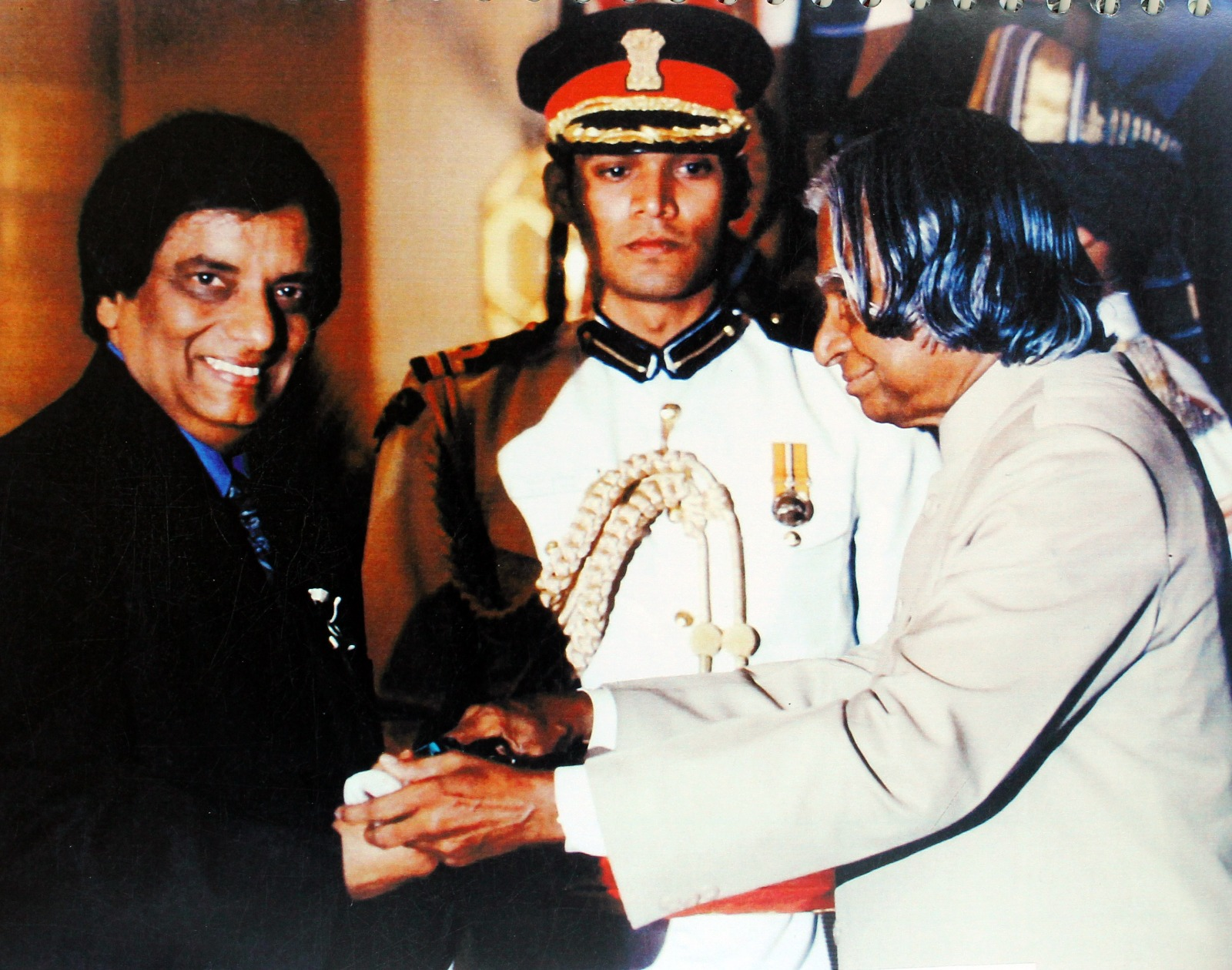
Lal Receiving Padma Bhushan by the President of India in 2003

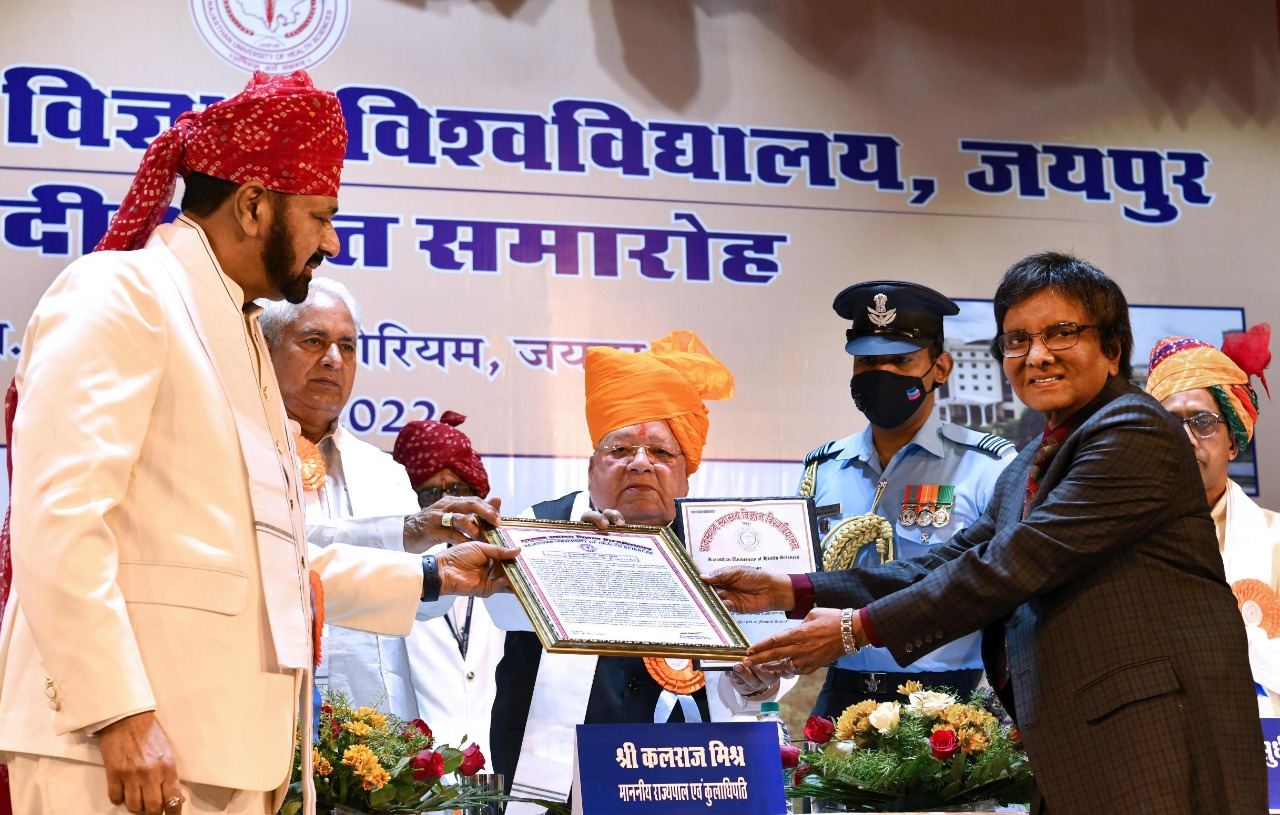
Lal being honoured with the Degree of Doctor of Science (D.Sc.) by Rajasthan University of Health Sciences.

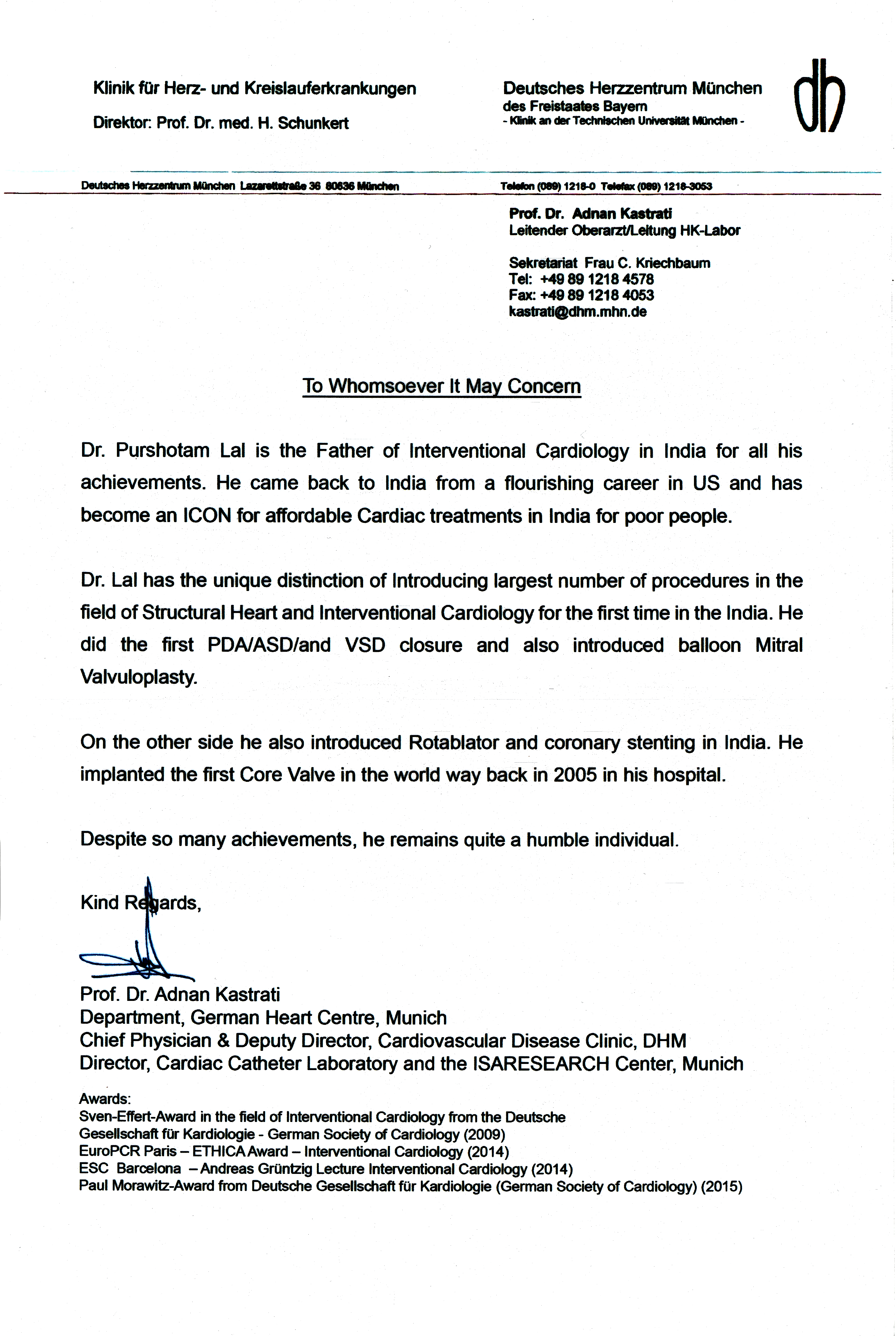
Appreciation Letter by Adnan Kastrati

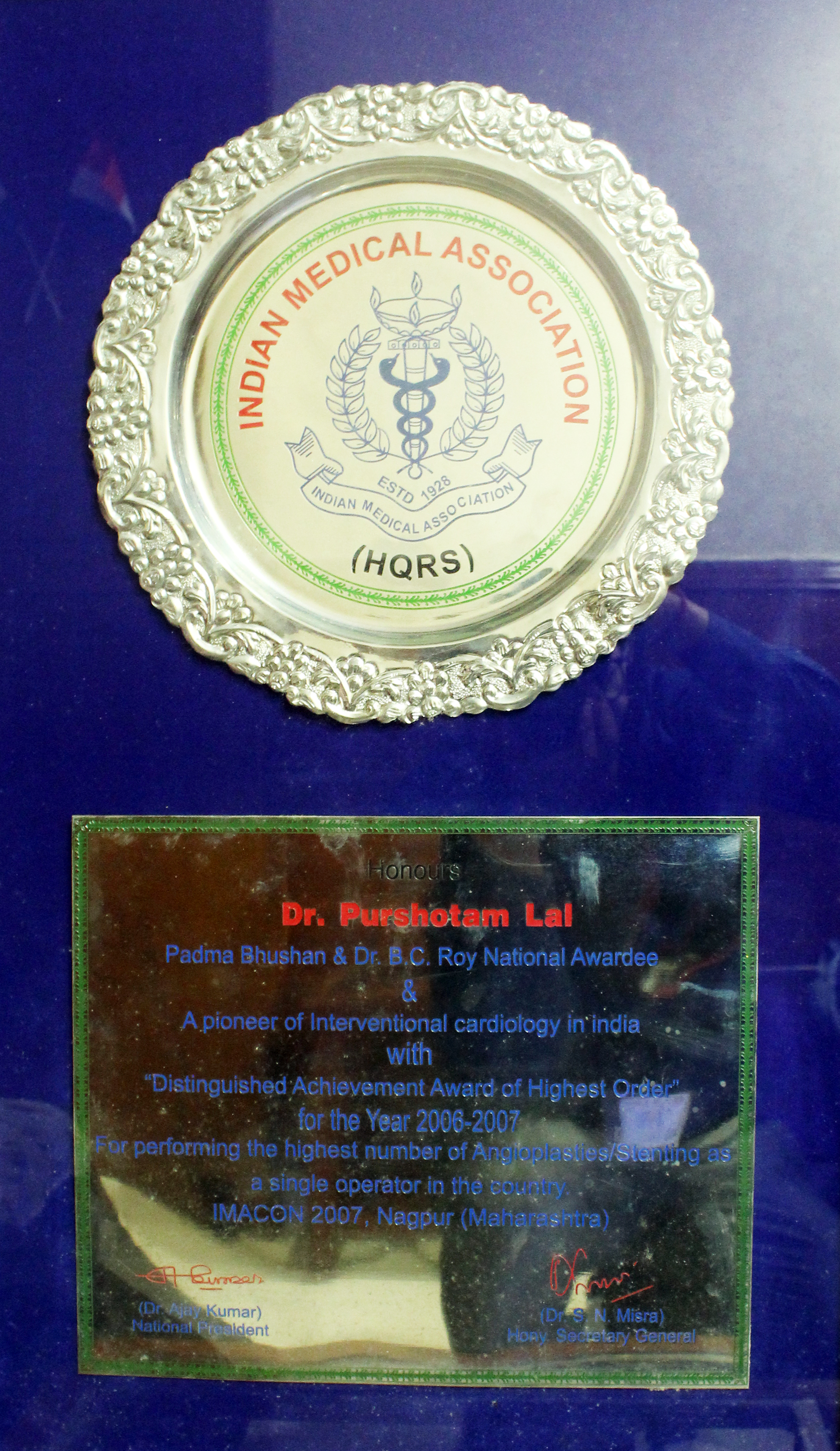
Distinguished Achievement Award of Highest Order for 2006-07

He presented and published scientific papers on all these new techniques for the first time in the country & these were published in Indian Heart Journal. He has been monikered as Father of Interventional Cardiology in India by Adnan Kastrati, Chief Physician and Deputy Director, Cardiovascular Disease Clinic, DHM, Germany for introducing all these techniques in the country. He is a highly decorated interventional cardiologist, having received the highest of Padma Awards - Padma Vibhushan, along with Padma Bhushan and the Dr. B. C. Roy Award by the President of India for his contributions in the development of Interventional Cardiology in India. Additionally, he has been honoured with the Distinguished Achievement Award of the Highest Order by the National Forum of Indian Medical Association for performing the largest number of angioplasties/stentings in the country as a single operator.

He was also recognised by Hans Bonnier, one of the first interventional cardiologists in the world, who congratulated him for his skills & achievements for doing the highest number of angioplasties in the country and was impressed with his endeavour to provide affordable healthcare to poor patients without compromising quality of healthcare delivery. He added that, his hospital model should be adopted by other hospitals as well.

== Early life and education ==
Lal was born in 1954, in a small village of Firozpur District, Punjab, India. He got his early education in his village where there was no electricity. He completed his pre-medical education at DAV College, where he was inducted into the Hall of Fame as one of 80 distinguished alumni in the college's 100-years history. He pursued his medical degree from Medical College, Amritsar and was national merit scholarship holder. After finishing his MBBS from Amritsar, he went to United States in 1977 for further studies.

Lal aimed to share his expertise with his fellow countrymen and spent time at Apollo Hospital, Chennai, where he introduced several cardiology techniques for the first time in India. In 1996, he returned to India as the Coordinator of the Department of Cardiology at Apollo Hospital, Delhi. In 1997, with the mission of providing affordable healthcare to low- and middle-income patients, he established the Metro Heart Institute.

== Philosophy ==
He developed multiple hospitals at the doorsteps of the lover-middle class people, after leading flourishing career at US, with the mission that "no patient should ever be returned for want of money". Lal has been an advocate against the commercialisation of medical services in India, particularly when it negatively impacts access for lower-income individuals, particularly of rural areas. In recognition of his contributions, he was named the "Creator of Affordable Healthcare" by prestigious healthcare magazine Express Healthcare.

Further to achieve his goal of creating medical facilities in the rural areas, he joined the Medical Council of India as Board of Governors for two years & developed a three-point formula to make specialists to go to villages. Since he lost his father in his 40's due to non-availability of doctors in the village, this had always been his goal to find out the ways where the specialists have to spend time in the village.

But so far he has not been successful in this particular mission, probably it requires some changes in government policies.

== Professional associations ==
He is certified by the American Specialty Board, he has been a fellow of American College of Cardiology, Society for Cardiovascular Angiography and Interventions (USA), American College of Medicine, Royal College of Physicians (Canada), Indian College of Cardiology and British Cardiovascular Intervention Society (BCIS). He is also a member of German Centre for Cardiovascular Research. Lal earned a Doctor of Science degree by Rajasthan University of Health Sciences.

He got involved in the development of various new procedures in the field of interventional cardiology, as an alternative to open heart surgery. He has held the position of assistant clinical professor & attending physician at Michigan State University and Cornell Medical Centre USA, respectively in the Department of Interventional Cardiology. He was also the visiting consultant in UK & Germany where he was involved with advanced interventional cardiology techniques under the guidance of Professor Kaltenbach, including long-wire and slow rotational angioplasty techniques. He has also been appointed as a professor and advisor in the department of interventional cardiology at Rajasthan University of Health Sciences and has served as an honorary professor and member of the National Advisory Board at Jaipur National University Institute for Medical Sciences and Research Centre.

== Contributions in the development of Interventional Cardiology in India ==
Lal has been at the forefront of cardiac innovations in India, performing several landmark procedures such as the first slow rotational angioplasty, coronary atherectomy, and non-surgical closure of atrial septal defects. His contributions have paved the way of advanced, minimally invasive treatments, significantly improving outcomes for patients with complex cardiovascular conditions.

- In November 1989, Lal performed the first case of slow rotational angioplasty in India at Apollo Hospital, Chennai. The procedure was conducted on a 33-year-old patient, who was a general surgeon, with a 100% blocked left anterior descending artery of the heart. The patient had previously been recommended for bypass surgery. As of 2018, the patient continued to do well.
- In September 1990, Purshotam Lal performed India's first Coronary Atherectomy (shaving of fatty tissue) at Apollo Hospital, Chennai. The procedure was carried out on a patient from Haridwar who was employed at Bharat Heavy Electricals Limited (BHEL). Coronary Atherectomy is a technique used to remove fatty tissues from blocked arteries, particularly in challenging cases where balloon angioplasty is ineffective.
- In June 1991, Purshotam Lal implanted, for the first time in the country, coronary stent, made of tantalum, manufactured by Strecker Company, in a patient at Apollo Hospital, Chennai. The patient, who suffered from unstable angina and acute occlusion of the right coronary artery, had undergone a balloon angioplasty of the RCA. The stent was successfully implanted as a bailout device.
- In February 1992, Lal performed India's first athero-abrasion (Rotablator - Diamond Drilling) procedure at Apollo Hospital on a patient from Dhuri, Punjab, who had a critical ostial block of the circumflex artery. The device was used to treat calcified arteries as balloon angioplasty was not effective.
- Lal was the first investigator for Inoue balloon mitral valvuloplasty called as PTMC. After working with A. Inoue, the inventor of the balloon at Japan, Lal persuaded both Inoue and the manufacturer, the Toray company to allow the procedure to be done in India, where the large number of patients suffering from Mitral Stenosis & Rheumatic Heart Disease till to this day, unlike the western countries. From 1990 onward, Lal introduced Inoue Balloon in the country & trained many cardiologists to do the procedure. The patient had previously suffered a brain stroke and was unable to afford the expenses associated with a Cath Lab. This was the first PTMC procedure in the country to be performed without a Cath Lab.
- In September 1992, Purshotam Lal performed a non-surgical closure of an Atrial Septal Defect (ASD) on a 19-year-old patient. The procedure utilized a device, made of nylon mesh named - MonoDisk, being it the first case of the world using MonoDisk Device.

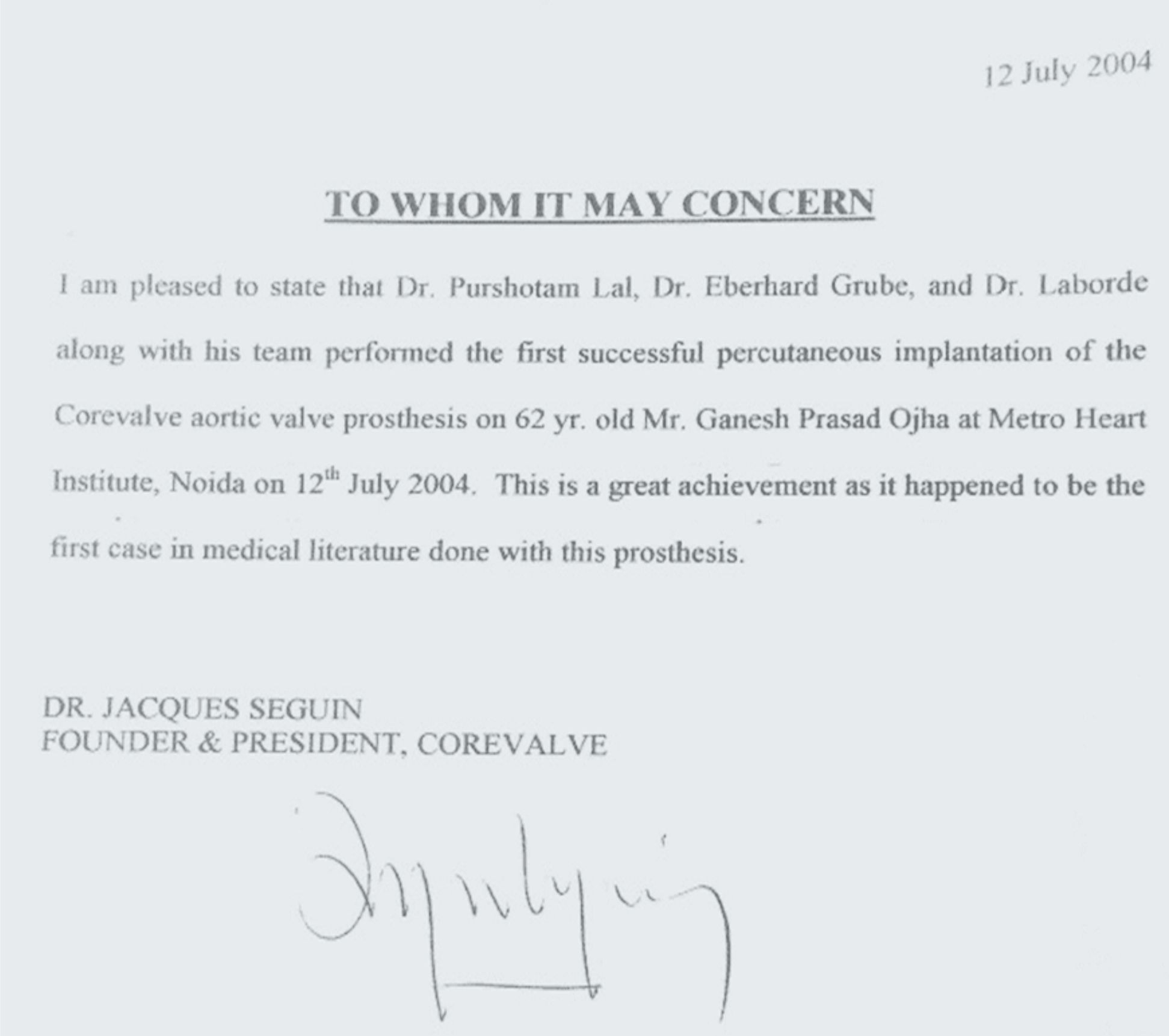
COREVALVE Certificate of FIRST USE

- Lal also credited to perform the world's first transcatheter aortic valve replacement (TAVR) using the CoreValve system. This procedure, done in 12 July 2004, conducted for a patient with severe aortic stenosis who was unfit for open-heart surgery, marked a significant advancement in non-surgical valve replacement techniques. This was first-in-man experience, got published & presented for the first time, internationally.
- In October 1990, Purshotam Lal performed India's first supported high-risk angioplasty utilizing cardiopulmonary bypass. This groundbreaking procedure involved managing a patient with severe left ventricular (LV) dysfunction by employing a Biomedica heart-lung machine for oxygenation. A catheter was inserted into the patient's right atrium, with another positioned in the aorta to facilitate the process. Lal presented the first scientific paper on this procedure at the Annual Conference of the Cardiological Society of India in 1991, and it was subsequently published as an abstract in the Indian Heart Journal.
- In July 1991, Dr. Purshotam Lal performed India's first non-surgical Left Atriofemoral Bypass Support procedure designed by him. The case involved a 58-year-old patient in cardiogenic shock with a systolic blood pressure of less than 50 mmHg and an ejection fraction of 15%. The patient was deemed unfit for surgery due to the high risk. Lal successfully carried out an aortic valvuloplasty with the support of this innovative bypass technique, demonstrating its utility in high-risk interventions like valvuloplasty and angioplasty for patients in cardiogenic shock. Lal's technique involved withdrawing oxygenated blood from the left atrium using an 18-French catheter, which was then circulated to the aorta through a roller pump. Unlike conventional systems, this approach did not require an oxygenator, making it significantly more affordable for Indian patients. Initially utilizing a custom-made device and roller pump, the procedure laid the groundwork for more advanced and expensive systems like the TandemHeart. He presented the papers on this technique at Annual Conference of Cardiology Society of India, which later got published.

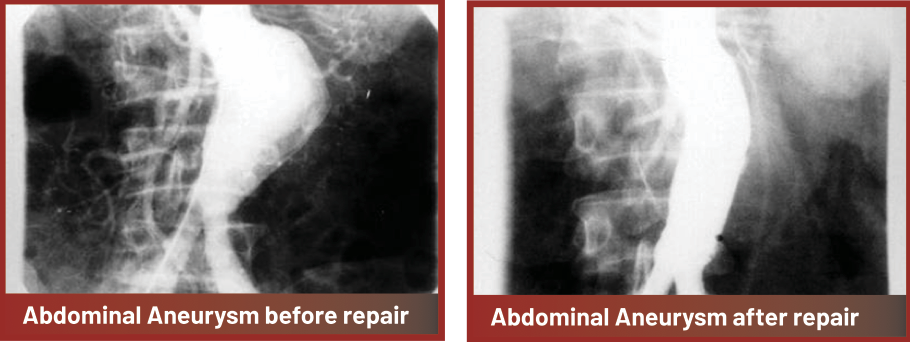
Abdominal Aortic Aneurysm - First non-surgical repair

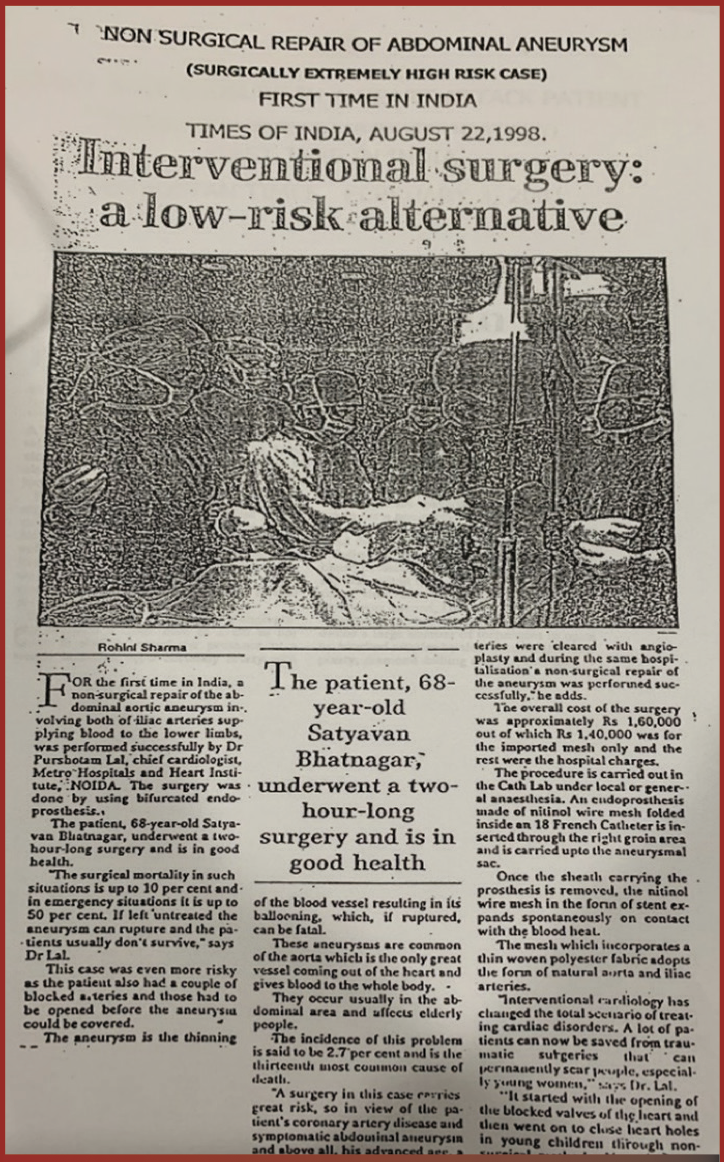

- In July 1998, Purshotam Lal achieved a milestone in Indian medical history by performing the India's first non-surgical repair of an abdominal aortic aneurysm involving both iliac arteries. The procedure was conducted on 68-year-old PhD doctor, who also had multiple blocked arteries that were treated prior to addressing the aneurysm. At the time, surgical repair carried a 10% mortality rate, escalating to 50% in emergencies. The innovative two-hour procedure, performed in a cath lab under general anesthesia, involved deploying an endoprosthesis made of nitinol wire mesh folded within an 18 French catheter. Guided through the groin to the aneurysmal sac, the prosthesis expanded upon exposure to blood heat, mimicking the shape of the natural aorta and iliac arteries. This groundbreaking intervention not only eliminated the need for open surgery but also significantly reduced associated risks, marking a turning point in the treatment of abdominal aortic aneurysms in India.
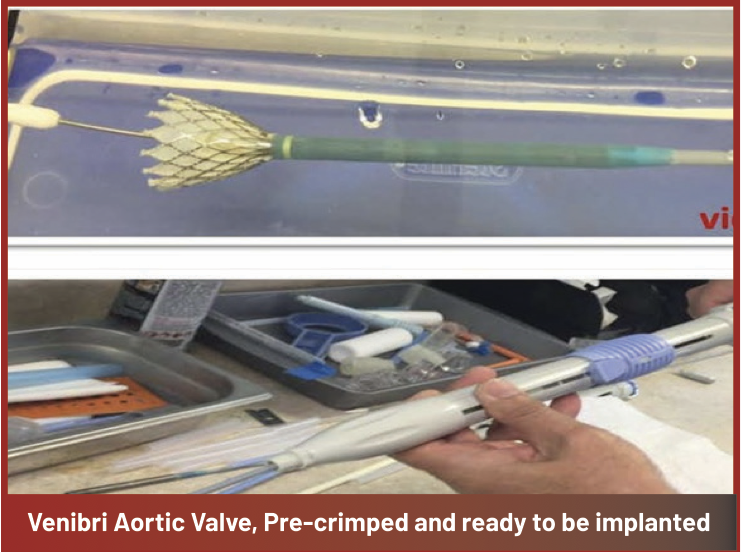
- Venibri Valve ready to implant
  On November 6, 2016, Dr. Purshotam Lal performed the first hybrid procedure combining the use of the Venibri aortic valve, a pre-crimped device from Venus Medtech, for Transcatheter Aortic Valve Replacement (TAVR) and stenting of the main artery (LAD) at Metro Heart Institute, Noida.
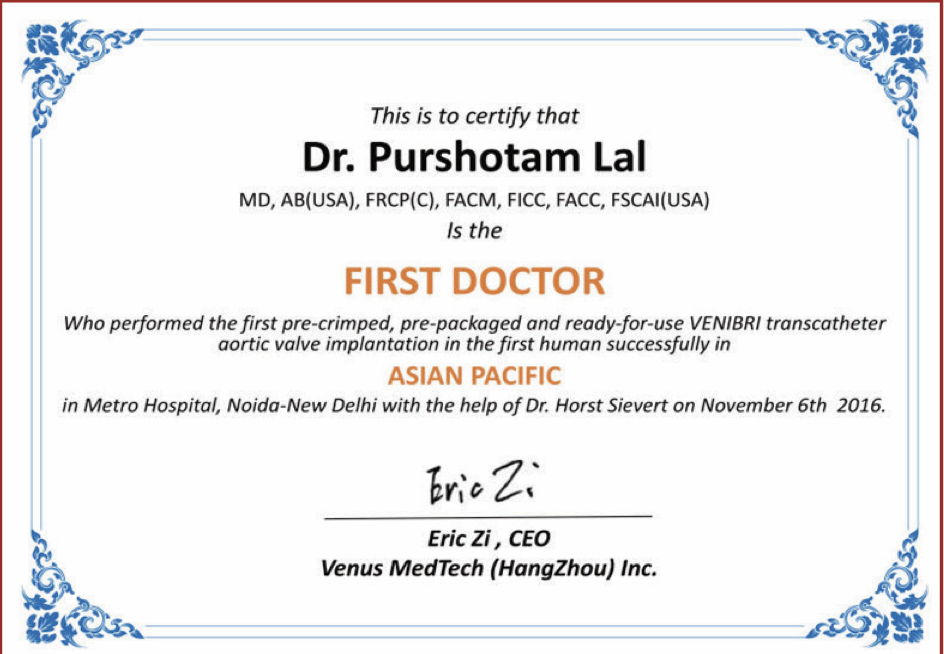
  Certificate for First Use of Venibri Valve by Dr Lal
  This was only the second global use of the Venibri valve, following its debut in Argentina, however, use of Venibri Valve & stunting of left main artery in same sitting, happens to be the 1st in human history. The groundbreaking procedure, completed in under 45 minutes, integrated Venibri TAVR with Percutaneous Transluminal Coronary Angioplasty (PTCA) and stenting. This achievement highlighted a significant advancement in minimally invasive cardiac interventions, reinforcing Metro Heart Institute's position as a leader in innovative cardiovascular care.
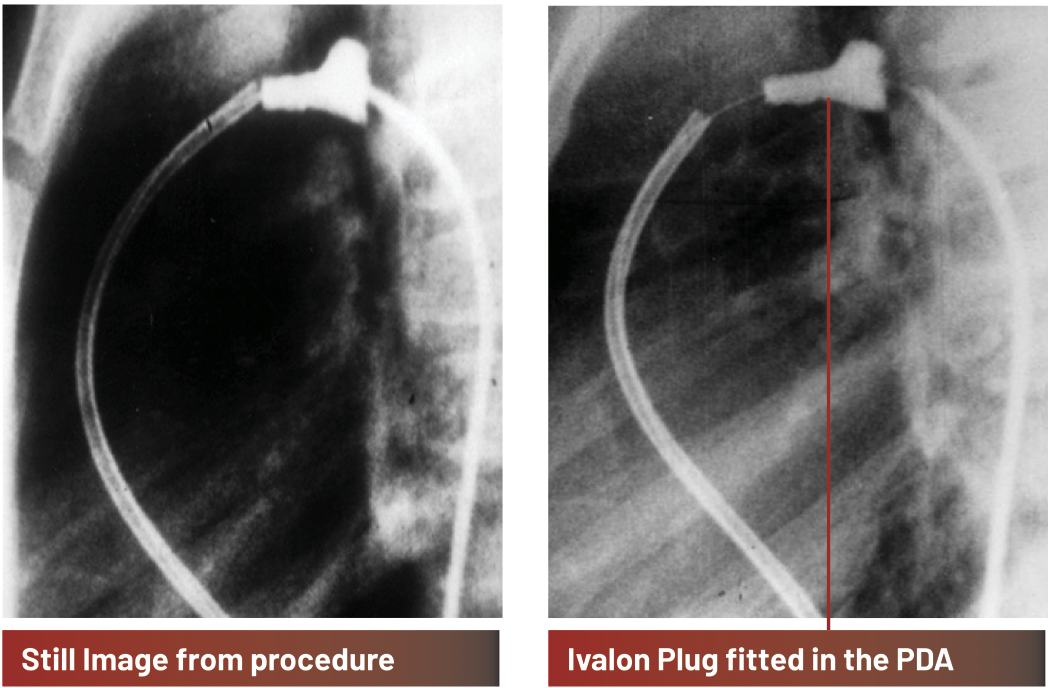
- Still Image from Procedure - Non-surgical PDA Closure
  In 1990, Dr. Purshotam Lal performed India’s first non-surgical closure of a patent ductus arteriosus (PDA) using the modified porstman's technique. The procedure, conducted on a 12-year-old boy from the Maldives at Apollo Hospital, Chennai, involved closing the congenital heart defect by introducing a specialized foam plug through a catheter. This minimally invasive approach provided a cost-effective alternative to surgery for PDA closure in children.

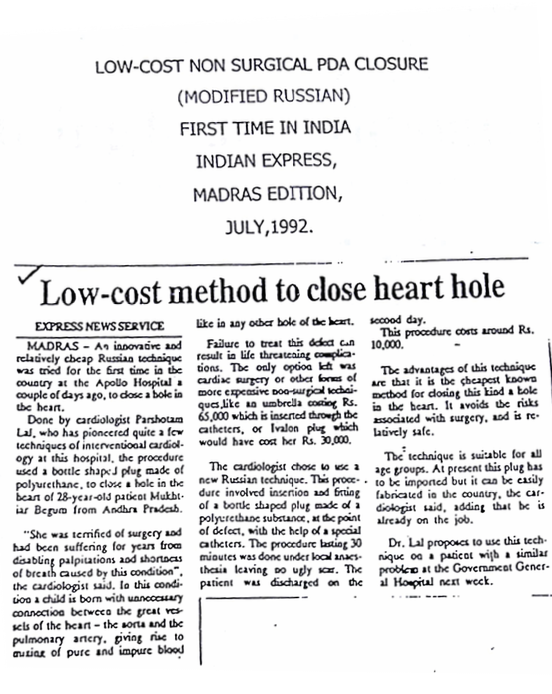
Media Coverage on 1st Time in India - Non-Surgical PDA Closure

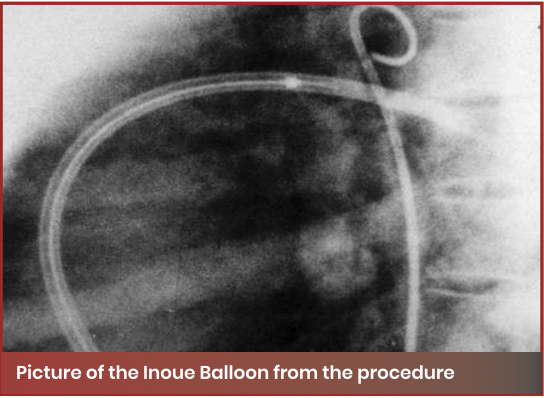
Picture of the Inoue Balloon from the procedure

- In 1992, Dr. Purshotam Lal performed India’s first non-surgical closure of a patent ductus arteriosus (PDA) using the Russian technique. Conducted on a 28-year-old patient from Andhra Pradesh, the procedure involved using a polyurethane bottle-shaped plug, which was placed at the defect site through a specialized catheter. This minimally invasive approach, completed in just 30 minutes, provided a cost-effective alternative to surgery and marked a significant advancement in interventional cardiology in India.

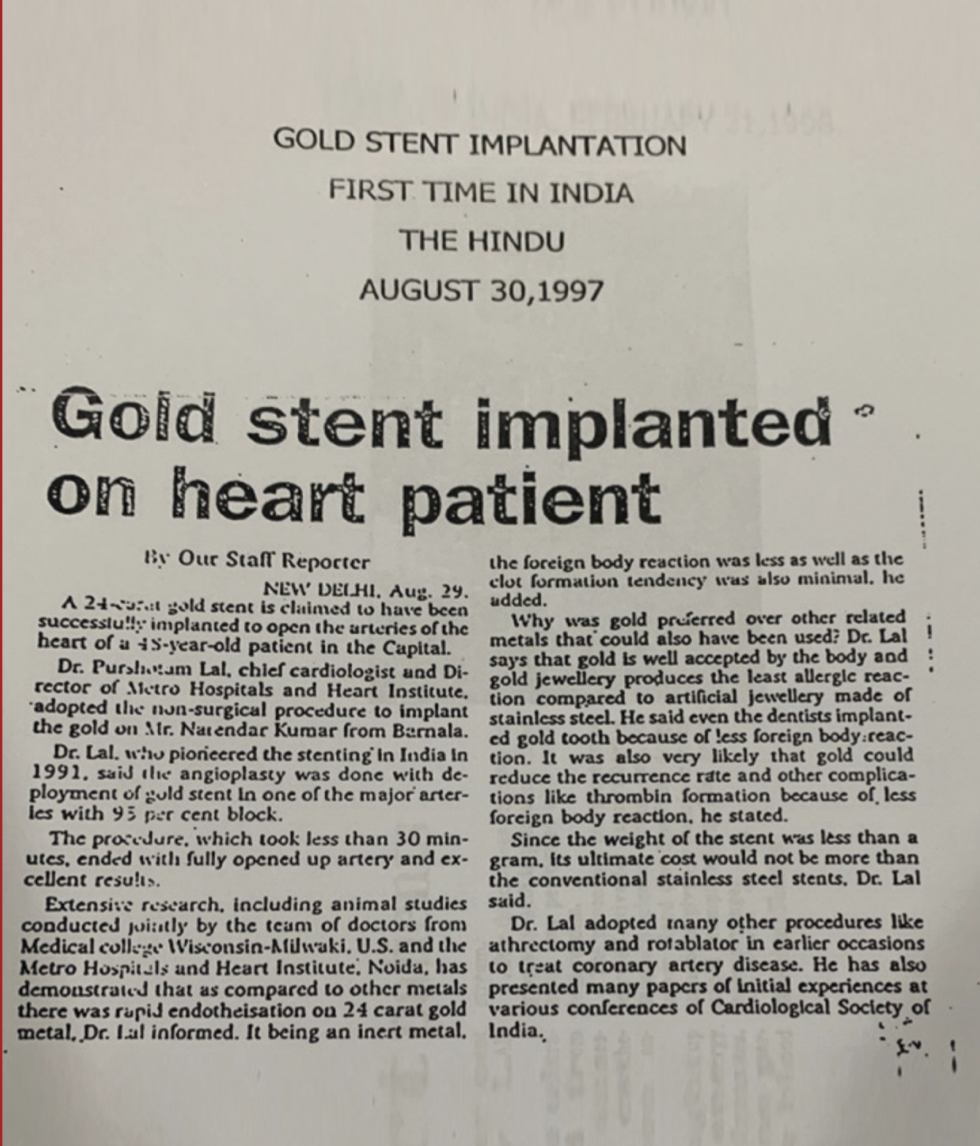
Press Coverage in the Hindu for Gold Stent

- In 1998, Dr. Purshotam Lal performed India’s first implantation of a 24-carat gold stent at Metro Heart Institute, Noida, on a 45-year-old patient, Mr. Narendar Kumar from Barnala. Completed in under 30 minutes, the procedure successfully opened the blocked artery with excellent results. Gold, being an inert metal, was chosen to minimize foreign body reactions and reduce clot formation. Weighing less than a gram, the gold stent also helped lower the risk of restenosis, marking a significant advancement in interventional cardiology.
- In February 1998, Dr. Purshotam Lal performed India's first ultrasound-assisted thrombolysis. The procedure was conducted on a 48-year-old patient who had suffered a heart attack due to a major blockage in the left anterior descending (LAD) artery caused by a blood clot. Utilizing an innovative approach, a probe attached to an ultrasound device was introduced through a guiding catheter to the site of the clot. Ultrasound energy was then delivered for five minutes, breaking the clot into fine particles that subsequently dissolved into the bloodstream. This technique was considered a breakthrough, particularly for patients with conditions like peptic ulcers or stroke, where conventional blood thinners pose a risk of severe bleeding.

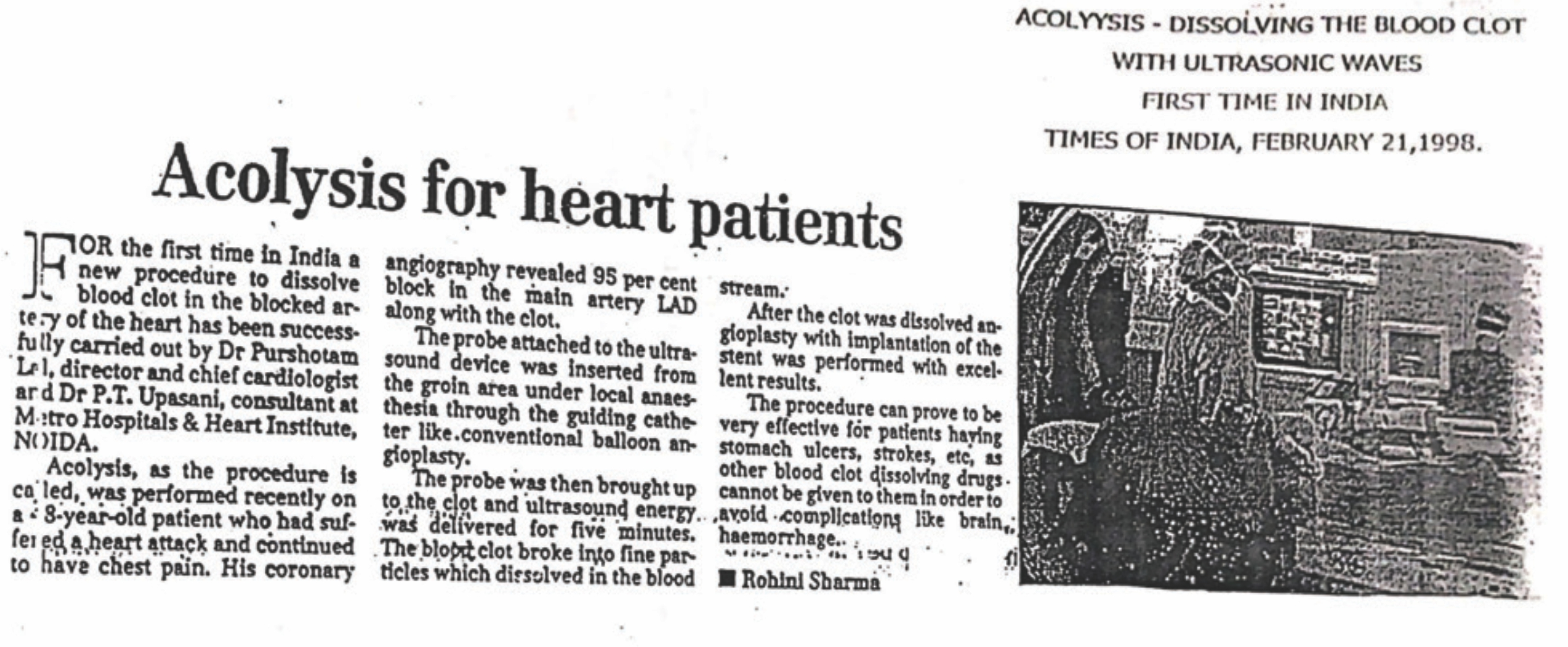
Press Coverage on First Case of Acolysis in India

- In April 1998, Dr. Purshotam Lal performed India’s first Angiogenesis procedure at Metro Heart Institute, Noida. This pioneering technique promotes the formation of new blood vessels in areas of arterial blockage, offering a potential treatment for patients deemed unfit for both bypass surgery and angioplasty—often categorized as "No-option" patients. The procedure involved injecting vascular endothelial growth factor (VEGF), a growth hormone, to stimulate blood vessel growth. In some cases, stem cells extracted from the patient’s bone marrow were also injected to enhance the angiogenesis process.
- In February 2001, Dr. Purshotam Lal performed India’s first non-surgical closure of a ventricular septal defect (VSD)resulting from a myocardial infarction (MI) at Metro Heart Institute, Noida (Delhi NCR). The patient, Mrs. Pushpa Devi Batra, a 62-year-old woman from Alwar, Rajasthan, had suffered a severe heart attack. Her condition was further complicated by hypertension-induced renal dysfunction. A coronary angiography revealed a 2 cm hole in her heart, a completely blocked right coronary artery (RCA), and additional blockages in other arteries. Given her critical condition, Dr. Lal opted for a percutaneous device closure, marking the first instance of this technique being used in India for post-MI VSD repair.

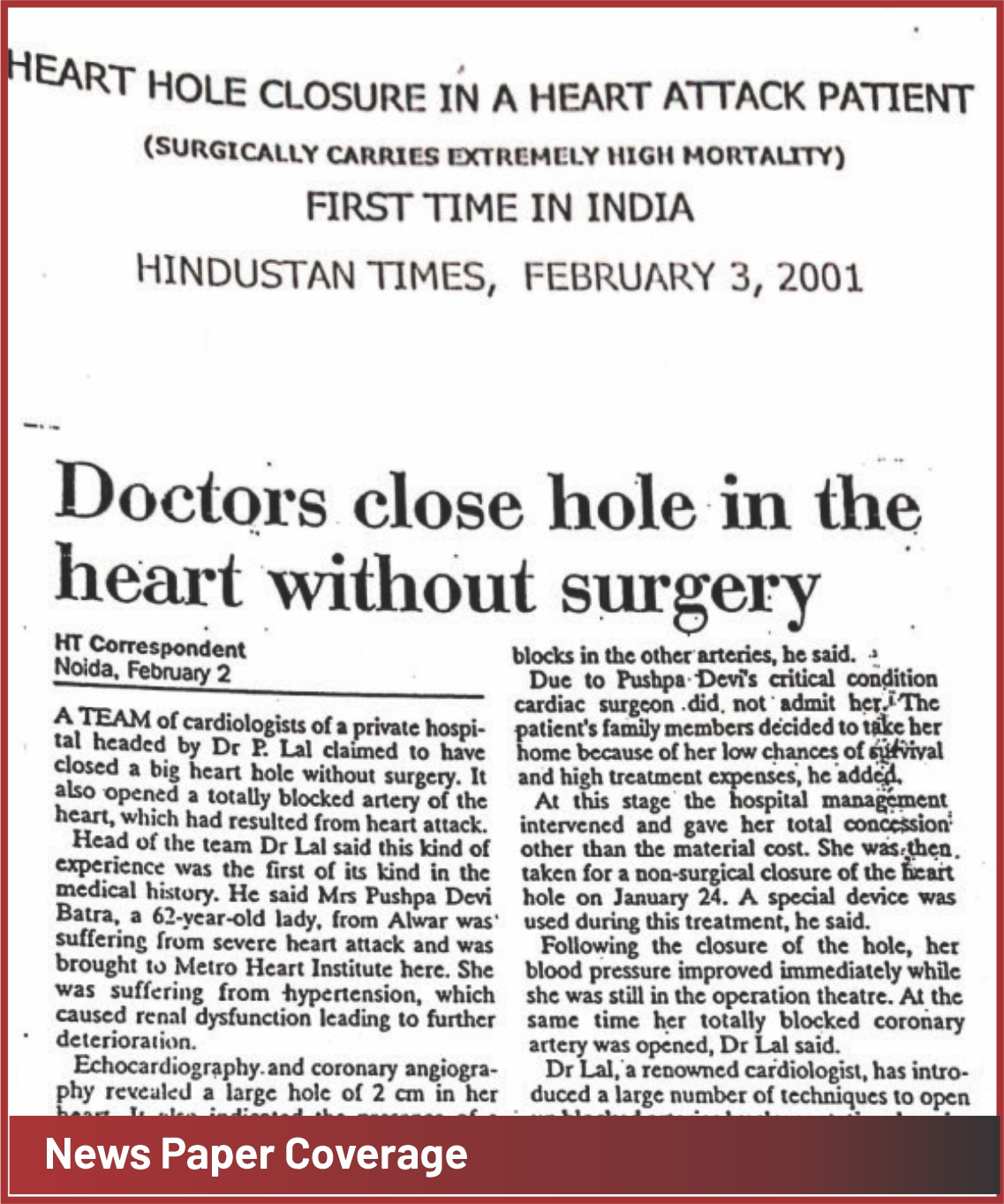
First Non-Surgical Closure of Post-Myocardial Infarction Ventricular Septal Defect (VSD) in India

== Memberships ==
- Fellow, American College of Cardiology
- Fellow, American College of Medicine
- Fellow, Royal College of Physicians (Canada)
- Fellow, Society of Cardiac Angiography and Interventions, USA
- Fellow, Indian College of Cardiology
- Member, British Cardiovascular Interventional Society
- Member, German Society of Cardiovascular Research
- Member, Central Council of Health & Family Welfare – an apex advisory body of the Ministry of Health & Family Welfare, Govt. of India
- Member, Expert Committee for medical devices, Ministry of Health & Family Welfare, Govt. of India
- Member, Delhi Medical Council

== Awards and honours ==
National Honours (Bestowed by the President of India)

- Padma Vibhushan (2009) - For innovations in the field of interventional cardiology
- Padma Bhushan (2003) - For exceptional and distinguished service in interventional cardiology
- Dr. B. C. Roy Award (2004) - The highest medical honour in India, awarded by the President for excellence for innovations in the field of interventional cardiology

Other Recognitions and Professional Honours

- 1985 - Best Teacher Award in the USA
- 1990 - Jawaharlal Nehru International Excellence Award
- 1991 - Rajiv Gandhi Award
- 1992 - Dr. V V Shah Oration Gold Medal by Cardiological Society of India for his pioneering contribution in Internation Cardiology
- 2002 - Life Time Achievement Award by Late Shri Arun Jaitley on behalf of Delhi Medical Association
- 2004 - Dr. B.L. Taneja Memorial Guest Lecture Award by Delhi Medical Association
- 2006 - Distinguished Achievement Award of Highest Order by National Forum of Indian Medical Association for performing the largest number of Angioplasties/Stentings as a single operator in the country
- 2009 - Dr. Wiliam Ganz Oration Award by World Congress of Cardiology
- 2015 - The World’s Greatest Brands of 2015, Asia & GC
- 2016 - Awarded “World’s Best Leader” in Indo-UAE Business Summit
- 2017 - Life Time Achievement Award by The Times of India
- 2021 - Life Time Achievement Award by Dainik Jagran Ayushman India 2021
- 2022 - Honorary Degree of Doctor of Science (Medicine) by Chancellor of Rajasthan University at the convocation ceremony of Rajasthan University of Health Sciences, Jaipur, 2022
- 2023 - Swasthya Ratan Award by Governor of Haryana
- 2023 - Iconic National Award by Indian Medical Association, Delhi
- 2023 - Lifetime Achievement Award by HIPE 3.0
