= Jayanta Debnath =

American physician

- Born: 1971 (age 54–55); North Carolina
- Citizenship: US
- Education: Georgia Institute of Technology; Harvard Medical School
- Scientific career
- Institutions: Harvard Medical School; University of California, San Francisco

Notes
- Lokenath Debnath (father)

Jayanta Debnath (born 1971) is an American physician who specializes in pathology. His research focuses on autophagy as it relates to cancer. He is the chair of the University of California, San Francisco department of pathology and a co-editor of the Annual Review of Pathology: Mechanisms of Disease.

== Early life and education ==
Jayanta Debnath was born in 1971 in North Carolina where his father Lokenath Debnath was a professor of mathematics at East Carolina University. Debnath attended Georgia Institute of Technology, graduating in 1992 with a bachelor's degree in chemistry. He then attended Harvard Medical School for his Doctor of Medicine, graduating in 1998. From 1998 to 2003 he completed his internship, medical residency, and fellowship in pathology at Brigham and Women's Hospital.

== Career ==
From 2003 to 2005 he was an instructor of cell biology at Harvard Medical School. In 2005, he joined the faculty of University of California, San Francisco as an assistant professor. He was promoted to associate professor in 2011 and full professor in 2016. In 2018, he was appointed the chair of UCSF's pathology department, succeeding Abul K. Abbas. In 2021 he was one of the six researchers at UCSF to jointly win the Endeavor Award from the Mark Foundation for Cancer Research, which is a US$3 million research grant to study metastasis of cancer. Debnath's research focuses on the cellular process of autophagy and its relevance to cancer, specifically breast cancer. He formerly served as the chair of the integration panel for the United States Department of Defense's Breast Cancer Research Program. As of 2021, he is a co-editor of the Annual Review of Pathology: Mechanisms of Disease. He has also served as an associate editor of the journal Autophagy. Dr. Debnath continues his work at UCSF by serving as both a professor and chair in the Department of Pathology, in which is also affiliated with the Biomedical Sciences Graduate Program, Helen Diller Family Comprehensive Cancer Center, Breast Oncology Program, and the Helen Diller Medical Center at Parnassus Heights. Debnath also runs the Debnath Lab, focusing studies on the role and regulation of autophagy in epithelial homeostasis as well as cancer pathogenesis.

== Awards and honors ==
In 2021 he was the recipient of the American Society for Investigative Pathology's Outstanding Investigator Award.

== Personal life ==
Debnath is Indian-American and speaks Bengali as well as English.
