= Mel B. Feany =

American neuropathologist

- Born: 1965 or 1966 (age 59–60); Prineville, Oregon
- Citizenship: US
- Education: Harvard University; Yeshiva University
- Scientific career
- Institutions: Harvard University

Mel B. Feany (born 1965 or 1966) is an American neuropathologist and geneticist at Brigham and Women's Hospital who researches neurodegenerative disease. She is a co-editor of the Annual Review of Pathology: Mechanisms of Disease.

== Early life and education ==
Mel B. Feany, the daughter of Pat and Marion Feany, grew up in Prineville, Oregon. She was an only child and enjoyed visiting the library. She graduated from Crook County High School in 1982, at the age of sixteen as her class's valedictorian. She earned a bachelor's degree in neuroscience from Harvard University, staying to earn a PhD in 1993 with advisors Margaret Livingstone and Kathleen Buckley. She then attended the Albert Einstein College of Medicine at Yeshiva University for her Doctor of Medicine.

== Career ==
Feany completed a medical residency in anatomic pathology at Brigham and Women's Hospital, followed by a fellowship in neuropathology. She primarily researches the fruit fly Drosophila as a model for human neurodegenerative disorders like Alzheimer's disease and Parkinson's disease. She is currently a professor of pathology at Harvard University at Brigham and Women's Hospital. She is a co-editor of the Annual Review of Pathology: Mechanisms of Disease.

=== Selected publications ===
- Feany, Mel B.; Bender, Welcome W. (2000). "A Drosophila model of Parkinson's disease". Nature. 404 (6776): 394–398. Bibcode:2000Natur.404..394F. doi:10.1038/35006074. PMID 10746727. S2CID 4423313.
- Shulman, Joshua M.; De Jager, Philip L.; Feany, Mel B. (2011). "Parkinson's Disease: Genetics and Pathogenesis". Annual Review of Pathology: Mechanisms of Disease. 6: 193–222. doi:10.1146/annurev-pathol-011110-130242. PMID 21034221.
- Chen, Li; Feany, Mel B. (2005). "Α-Synuclein phosphorylation controls neurotoxicity and inclusion formation in a Drosophila model of Parkinson disease". Nature Neuroscience. 8 (5): 657–663. doi:10.1038/nn1443. PMID 15834418. S2CID 17524124.

== Awards and honors ==
Feany was awarded the Outstanding Investigator Award from the American Society for Investigative Pathology in 2009. In 2019 she was awarded the Landis Award for Outstanding Mentorship from the National Institute of Neurological Disorders and Stroke.
