= Haemo =

Haemo- is a word prefix that refers to blood, derived from the Greek word αἷμα (haima). Numerous medical and scientific terms incorporate the prefix, some of which can in turn be abbreviated as 'haemo'. These include:

- Haemoglobin, a protein carried by red blood cells
- Haemodialysis, direct dialysis of the blood (as distinct from indirect peritoneal dialysis)
- Haemodynamics, the study of blood flow
- Haemopathology, the study of blood diseases
  - Various species of blood parasite
  - Haemophilia, a blood disease, or its sufferers, haemophiliacs
