= Kathleen H. Burns =

American pathologist

- Education: Johns Hopkins Hospital, Johns Hopkins Hospital, Baylor College of Medicine, University of Southern Mississippi
- Employers: Dana–Farber Cancer Institute (2020–); Johns Hopkins School of Medicine (2008–2009); Johns Hopkins School of Medicine (2009–2014); Johns Hopkins School of Medicine (2014–2018); Johns Hopkins School of Medicine (2018–2020)
- Awards: Fellow of the American Association for the Advancement of Science (2025)

Kathleen H. Burns, Ph.D., M.D., is a Professor of Pathology at Harvard Medical School and Chair of the Department of Pathology at the Dana-Farber Cancer Institute. She previously worked at Johns Hopkins School of Medicine. As of 2025, Burns became a co-editor of the Annual Review of Pathology: Mechanisms of Disease. She is an elected member of the American Society for Clinical Investigation and the Interurban Clinical Club and has been given a Career Award for Medical Scientists by the Burroughs Wellcome Fund.

== Early life and education ==
Kathleen Helen Burns was born in Birmingham, Alabama. She attended the University of Southern Mississippi, completing her degree in Chemistry and Biochemistry in 1997. She was accepted into the National Institutes of Health's Medical Scientist Training Program, and completed her M.S.T.P. at Baylor College of Medicine in Houston, Texas. In 2004, she was recruited to become a clinical pathology resident (2004-2007) and later chief resident (2006-2007) at Johns Hopkins University in Baltimore, Maryland.

== Career ==
Following her residency, Burns joined the faculty of Johns Hopkins School of Medicine, rising to full professor in 2018. In 2015 Burns became Deputy Director (Vice Chair) for Research and Programs for the Department of Pathology at Johns Hopkins School of Medicine. She also served as Director of the Physician-Scientist Training Program for the school.

In 2020, Burns became Department Chair of the Department of Pathology at the Dana-Farber Cancer Institute in Boston, Massachusetts. She also serves as Vice Chair of the Department of Pathology; Senior Hematopathologist at Brigham and Women’s Hospital; and Professor of Pathology at Harvard Medical School.

== Research ==
External videos
- CSHL Keynote, Dr. Kathleen H Burns, Harvard University 2025.

Burns studies self-propagating retrotransposons and their role in human disease. Her research challenges the view that such elements are nonfunctional and serve as “junk DNA.” Her lab has developed techniques for mapping the mobile insertion sites of repetitive DNAs and transposable elements in the human genome. This research suggests that transposons play a role in cancer and in autoimmune diseases. LINE-1 expression is a characteristic of human cancers. The Burns lab developed the first commercial monoclonal antibody for detection of LINE-1-encoded RNA-binding protein. Burns' research on LINE-1 expression seeks to develop new treatment approaches for cancer.

== Awards ==
- 2008, Burroughs Wellcome Fund Career Award for Medical Scientists
- 2018, elected member, American Society for Clinical Investigation (ASCI)
- 2021, M. Daria Haust Lecturer of Pathology and Molecular Medicine, Queen's University at Kingston
- 2024, Interurban Clinical Club (ICC), Boston

== Selected publications ==
- Matzuk, MM; Burns, KH; Viveiros, MM; Eppig, JJ (21 June 2002). "Intercellular communication in the mammalian ovary: oocytes carry the conversation". Science. 296 (5576): 2178–80. Bibcode:2002Sci...296.2178M. doi:10.1126/science.1071965. PMID 12077402.
- Huang, Cheng Ran Lisa; Burns, Kathleen H.; Boeke, Jef D. (15 December 2012). "Active Transposition in Genomes". Annual Review of Genetics. 46: 651–675. doi:10.1146/annurev-genet-110711-155616. ISSN 0066-4197. PMC 3612533. PMID 23145912.
- Burns, KH (July 2017). "Transposable elements in cancer". Nature Reviews. Cancer. 17 (7): 415–424. doi:10.1038/nrc.2017.35. PMID 28642606.
- Bourque, G; Burns, KH; Gehring, M; Gorbunova, V; Seluanov, A; Hammell, M; Imbeault, M; Izsvák, Z; Levin, HL; Macfarlan, TS; Mager, DL; Feschotte, C (19 November 2018). "Ten things you should know about transposable elements". Genome Biology. 19 (1): 199. Bibcode:2018GenBi..19..199B. doi:10.1186/s13059-018-1577-z. PMC 6240941. PMID 30454069.
- Burns, Kathleen H. (24 January 2020). "Our Conflict with Transposable Elements and Its Implications for Human Disease". Annual Review of Pathology: Mechanisms of Disease. 15: 51–70. doi:10.1146/annurev-pathmechdis-012419-032633. ISSN 1553-4006. PMID 31977294.
- ICGC/TCGA Pan-Cancer Analysis of Whole Genomes, Consortium (February 2020). "Pan-cancer analysis of whole genomes". Nature. 578 (7793): 82–93. Bibcode:2020Natur.578...82I. doi:10.1038/s41586-020-1969-6. PMC 7025898. PMID 32025007.
- Cortés-Ciriano, I; Lee, JJ; Xi, R; Jain, D; Jung, YL; Yang, L; Gordenin, D; Klimczak, LJ; Zhang, CZ; Pellman (March 2020). "Comprehensive analysis of chromothripsis in 2,658 human cancers using whole-genome sequencing". Nature Genetics. 52 (3): 331–341. doi:10.1038/s41588-019-0576-7. PMC 7058534. PMID 32025003.
- Burns, Kathleen H. (22 April 2022). "Repetitive DNA in disease". Science. 376 (6591): 353–354. Bibcode:2022Sci...376..353B. doi:10.1126/science.abl7399. PMID 35446653.
- de Santiago, Pamela R.; Sato, Sho; Zhang, Stephanie J.; Dougher, Meaghan C.; Devins, Kyle M.; Bilecz, Agnes J.; Rayamajhi, Sagar; Mingo, Gabriel; Rendulich, Hannah S.; Feng, Yi; Wu, Connie; Taylor, Martin S.; Zhuravlev, Yelena; Jung, Euihye; Omran, Dalia K.; Wang, Tian-Li; Shih, Ie-Ming; Schwartz, Lauren E.; Kim, Sarah; Morgan, Mark A.; Tanyi, Janos L.; Burns, Kathleen H.; Lengyel, Ernst; Parra-Herran, Carlos; Godwin, Andrew K.; Walt, David R.; Drapkin, Ronny (6 March 2025). "LINE-1 ORF1p expression occurs in clear cell ovarian carcinoma precursors and is a candidate blood biomarker". npj Precision Oncology. 9 (1) 62: 1–12. doi:10.1038/s41698-025-00849-1. ISSN 2397-768X. PMC 11885553. PMID 40050409.
