= Stephen J. Galli =

American pathologist

- Born: 1947 (age 77–78); Somerville, Massachusetts, United States
- Education: Harvard University; Dartmouth College; Harvard Medical School
- Partner: Anne Stuart
- Children: 1
- Scientific career
- Institutions: Harvard Medical School; Stanford University School of Medicine

Stephen Joseph Galli (born 1947) is an American pathologist who researches mast cells and basophils. He is a member of the National Academy of Medicine, a recipient of the National Institutes of Health MERIT Award, and former co-editor of the Annual Review of Pathology: Mechanisms of Disease.

== Early life and education ==
Stephen Joseph Galli was born in 1947 in Somerville, Massachusetts to parents Beatrice née Artone and Joseph M. Galli. Galli recalled wanting to be a scientist from a young age; he was initially interested in insects and reptiles and thought he would become a wildlife manager. After finishing his high school diploma at Malden High School, Galli attended Harvard University, graduating in 1968 with a bachelor's degree in biology. He then attended Geisel School of Medicine at Dartmouth College, followed by earning his Doctor of Medicine at Harvard Medical School in 1973.

== Career ==
Galli completed his medical residency in anatomic pathology at Massachusetts General Hospital. In 1979 he joined the faculty of Harvard Medical School as an assistant professor of pathology. He was promoted to professor in 1993. In 1999 he joined the faculty of Stanford University School of Medicine as chair of its pathology department and as a professor of pathology, microbiology, and immunology. He completed his tenure as chair in 2016. From 2009 to 2016 he was additionally the co-director of the Stanford Center for Genomics and Personalized Medicine. His lab researches the regulation of basophils and mast cells and the role that these cells play in diseases. He additionally researches allergies, including food allergies, and how they can be monitored and clinically managed. He was a co-editor of the Annual Review of Pathology: Mechanisms of Disease from 2007–2016 and remains on the editorial committee as of 2021.

== Awards and honors ==
Galli has received various awards, including the National Institutes of Health MERIT Award in 1995, the Scientific Achievement Award from the World Allergy Organization in 2011, and Rous-Whipple Award from the American Society for Investigative Pathology in 2014. He was the recipient of the prestigious ASIP gold-headed cane award in 2024. In 2019 he received an honorary doctorate from the University of Naples Federico II. He has been elected to scientific societies such as the National Academy of Medicine, Collegium Internationale Allergologicum, and Accademia dei Lincei.

== Personal life ==
Galli enjoys writing limericks about his research. While at Massachusetts General Hospital, he met fellow researcher Anne Stuart. He and Stuart married in 1974, had a son, and authored publications together.
