= Government Medical College, Amritsar =

Medical college in Punjab, India

Coordinates: 31.6511794°N 74.8842908°E

- Former names: Glancy Medical College
- Type: Public
- Established: 1864; 162 years ago
- Affiliations: National Medical Commission
- Academic affiliations: Baba Farid University of Health Sciences
- Director-Principal: Dr. Rajiv Devgan
- Undergraduates: 750
- Postgraduates: 140
- Location: Amritsar, Punjab, India
- Website: www.gmc.edu.in

Government Medical College, Amritsar, formerly known as Glancy Medical College, is a medical college in Punjab, India. It was established in 1864 in Lahore, British India. It was moved to Amritsar, India in 1920. The hospital caters to the poorest of poor in the region and nearly fifty per cent of about 1000 surgeries done every month are free of cost under Ayushman Sehat Bima Yojana.

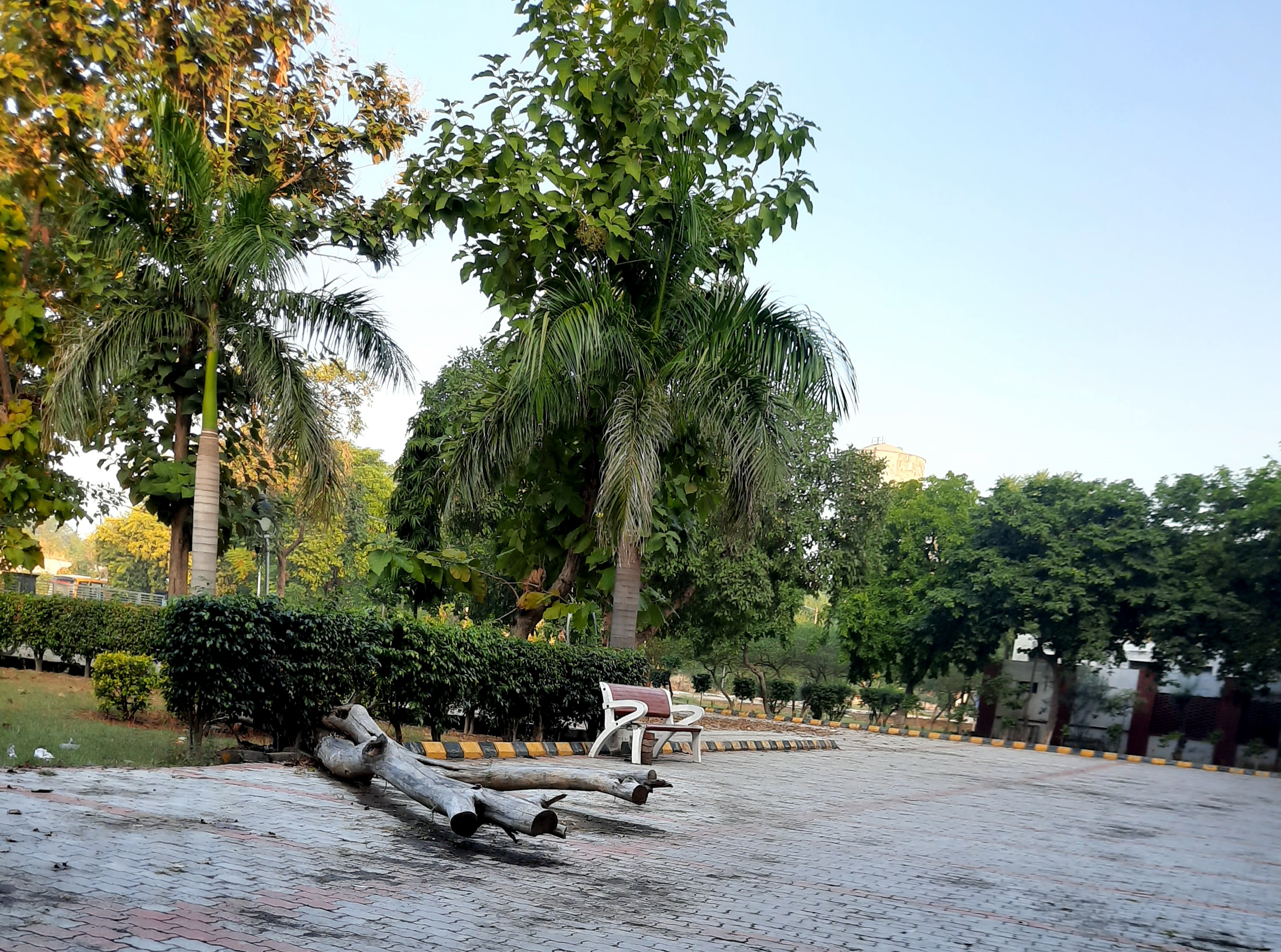
Campus of GMC Amritsar

== History ==
In, 1947 India became a separate nation and was partitioned into India and Pakistan. Punjab was divided into East Punjab (India) and West Punjab (Pakistan). During this time, GMCA was the only medical college present in Northern India. The college's original name Glancy Medical College was named after the former Governor-General of Punjab and was renamed to its current name after independence.

The college is governed by Director Research and Medical Education, Punjab and is affiliated to Baba Farid University of Health Sciences, Faridkot.

== Campus ==
The college is on the Circular Road and Majitha Road in the holy city of Amritsar and provides MBBS course to 250 medical students every year. Besides, it also provides MD/MS courses to 140 post-graduate students in many specialties. The college also provides B.Sc. Nursing and B.Sc. Paramedical Sciences degrees to students for overall welfare of the medical field along with doctorate degrees.

A nine storeyed Bebe Nanki Mother & Child Care Centre and the Guru Teg Bahadur Diagnostic & Superspeciality Complex have been built and attached to the college in the year 2012 with partial funding from Government of India under the Pradhan Mantri Swasthya Suraksha Yojana (PMSSY).

Two separate complexes for the College of Nursing and the Swami Vivekananda Drug Deaddiction Centre have also been attached to the college.

The Ram Saran Das Prakash Wati Kakkar Children ward, Karam Singh Ward, Sri Guru Teg Bahadur Hospital and Sant Ram Dhall Hospital are no longer parts of Medical College as the land housing these Hospitals has been relocated to other institutes or sold. The departments housed in these hospitals have been shifted to Guru Nanak Dev Hospital, the Bebe Nanki Mother & Child Centre and the Guru Teg Bahadur Diagnostic and Super-specialty Complex.

In May 2024, a low vision centre is established under the Roshini programme by CBM India Trust in partnership with Dr Rajendra Prasad Centre for Ophthalmic Sciences (AIIMS), regional AIIMS, and Regional Institutes. The centre conducts outreach programmes for schools in the region.

== Affiliated hospitals ==
- Guru Nanak Dev Hospital
- Sri Guru Teg Bahadur Hospital
- Bebe Nanaki Centre for Mother & Child Care
- SGTB Trauma Center
- Ram Lal Eye and ENT Hospital
- TB & Chest Diseases Hospital
- Swami Vivekananda Deaddiction Center

== Notable alumni ==
- Purshotam Lal
- Vinay Kumar
- Sukhbir Singh Sandhu
