= Bhaskar Nath =

Baba Bhaskar Nath
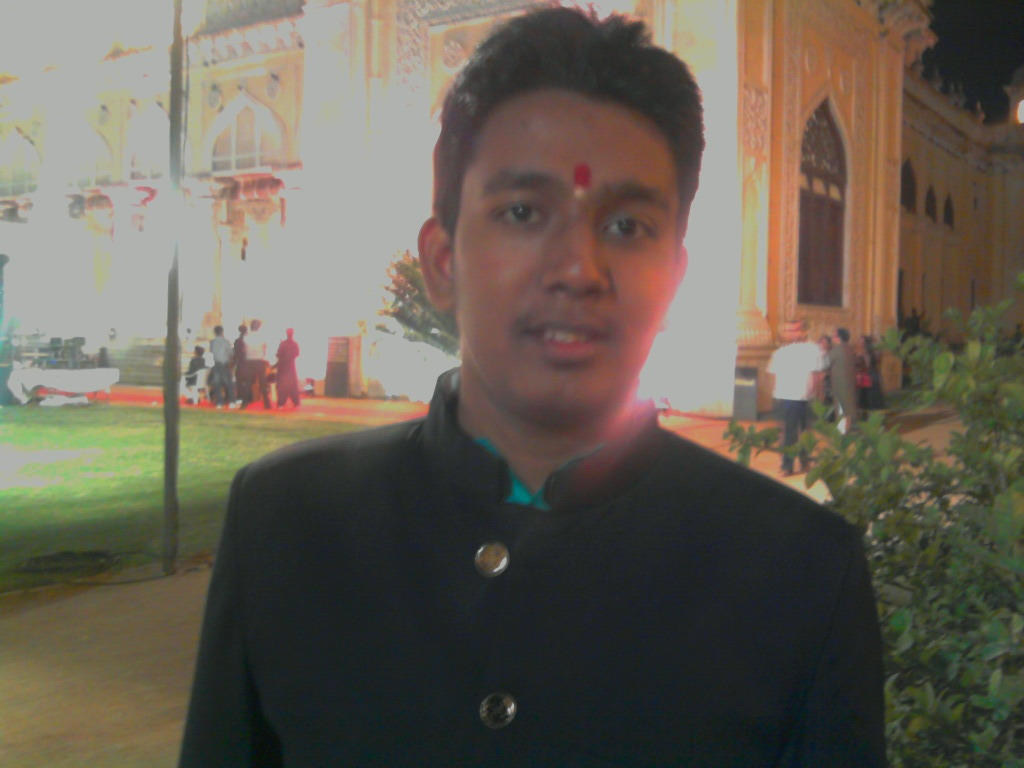
- At a music festival in Hyderabad, 2011

Background information
- Born: 23 September 1994 (age 32); New Delhi
- Origin: Meerut, Uttar Pradesh, India
- Genre: Hindustani Classical Music
- Instruments: Shehnai, Flute, Harmonium

Baba Bhaskar Nath (born 23 September 1994) is an Indian classical instrumentalist. He plays shehnai. Belonging from the Meerut Shehnai Gharana, he is considered a child prodigy.

== Early life ==
Baba Bhaskar Nath was born in New Delhi in a family of musicians originally hailing from Meerut to classical singer Pandit Vishwanath and K Rajlaxmi. His uncle is Pandit Jagannath, also a Shehnai player. He started learning Shehanai and Harmonium at a young age under the guidance of his grandfather Om Prakash. He is schooling at Delhi Public School. He is training under vocalist Pandit Jasraj.

== Career ==
Baba Bhaskar Nath gave his first solo performance at the age of 10. His renders in ragas in Gayaki ang (style), Banarasi dhun, Thumri, Chaiti, Kajri and Tappa.

Baba Bhaskar Nath belongs to a family of renowned musicians of Meerut Shehnai Gharana. He started his early training in Shehnai, Flute, and Harmonium at a very young age under the guidance of his grand father, the Late. Pt. Om Prakash, his paternal uncle, Sangeet Natak Academy Awarded the Late. Pt. Jagannath who was an internationally acclaimed Shehnai Vadak and his father the renowned vocalist of Kirana Gharana, Yash Bharati Awardee Pt. Vishwanath. He is currently learning the fine nuances of music under Guru Shishya Parampra from “Padam Vibhushan” Sangeet Martand, Pt. Jasraj ji.

He performed at major festivals, such as the Sawai Gandharva Bhimsen Festival in 2010, and Pandit Motiram Pandit Maniram Sangeet Samaroh in 2011. He has done his graduation in Economic (HONS) from Hindu college, University of Delhi .

Baba Bhaskar Nath was influenced by the highly imaginative and expressive musical style of his paternal uncle, Pt. Jagannath Ji, particularly in the rendering of ragas in the gayaki ang. His repertoire also includes Banarasi dhun, thumri, chaiti, kajri, and tappa.

== Awards ==
- 1st Prize in All India Music Competition
- 1st Prize in All India Delhi Public School Competition

== Performances ==
- Meerut Mahotsav, Meerut – 2005-2006
- A.I.R, Udaipur - 2006
- Sankat Mochan Sangeet Samaroh, Varanasi – 2009
- Baba Vishwanath Sangeet Samaroh, Delhi – 2009
- “Bharat Ratna” M.S. Subbalakshmi Sangeet Samaro (Shankra Art's), Varanasi
- Ustaad Allauddin Khan Sangeet Evam Kala Academy, Bhopal, M.P.
- Saptak Sangeet Samaroh – Ahmedabad
- Pt. Omkar nath Sangeet Samaroh – Mumbai
- Kal-Ke-Kalakaar – Mumbai
- Mridangacharya Nana Saheb Pharse Smriti Samaroh, Damoh, M.P. Organised by (Ustad Allauddin Khan Sangeet Evam Kala Academy)
- Ustad Bismillah Khan Smriti Samaroh, Jaipur organised by (Shruti Mandal & Rajasthan Cultural Ministry)
- Swar Amrit Sangeet Samaroh – Mahakumbh Mela, Haridwaar
- Pt. Vishnu Prasanna Smriti Samaroh, Kashi Baithak, Delhi – 2010
- Epi Center, Gurgaon – 2010
- Rama Krishna Mission, Lucknow (148th Anniversary of Swami Vivekananda)
- Shri Durgyana Sangeet Samaroh, Amritsar.
- Ustad Bade Ghulam Ali Khan Smriti Samaroh, Chandigarh.
- Ravindra Bhawan, M.P. Sanskriti Parishad.
- Sawai Gandharv, Pune
- 39th Pt. Mani Pt. Moti Ram Sangeet Samaroh, Hyderabad (organised by Pt. Jasraj ji).
- Virasat, Dehradoon
- Idea Jalsa, Zee TV.
- Youth Mahotsav’2011, Delhi by Delhi Government
- Indo French Music Concert, Paris, France
- Swami Harivallabh sangeet samaroh Vrindavan
- North American Bengali Conference, Houston, USA 2015
- Akashwani Sangeet Sammelan, Gulbarga, 2016
- Saptak Sangeet Samaroh, Ahmedabad, 2016
- Mata Niramala Devi Foundation
- SVBC, Tirumala, Tirupathi
- Shruti Mandal Jaipur
- Shani Mandir, Indore,
