= Nath Bank =

Indian bank

The Nath Bank (Bengali: নাথ ব্যাংক) was an Indian-owned bank founded by Kshetra Nath Dalal in 1926 in Noakhali, now in Bangladesh but then in undivided India. By 1947, when the Partition of India was imminent, the bank had its head office and three branches in Noakhali district, and a branch in Comilla in Tipperah District. Noakhali and Tipperah districts became part of Pakistan, so the bank moved its head office to Kolkata. At that time, Indian banks were facing a severe crisis. In 1949, the Nath Bank had to be bailed out by the Reserve Bank of India. That failed to resolve the crisis and the bank was finally liquidated in 1950. The economist Arun Ghosh attributes its collapse to its over-aggressive expansion of branch banking. The failure of the bank created a panic among depositors.
