= Vinay Kumar (pathologist) =

American pathologist

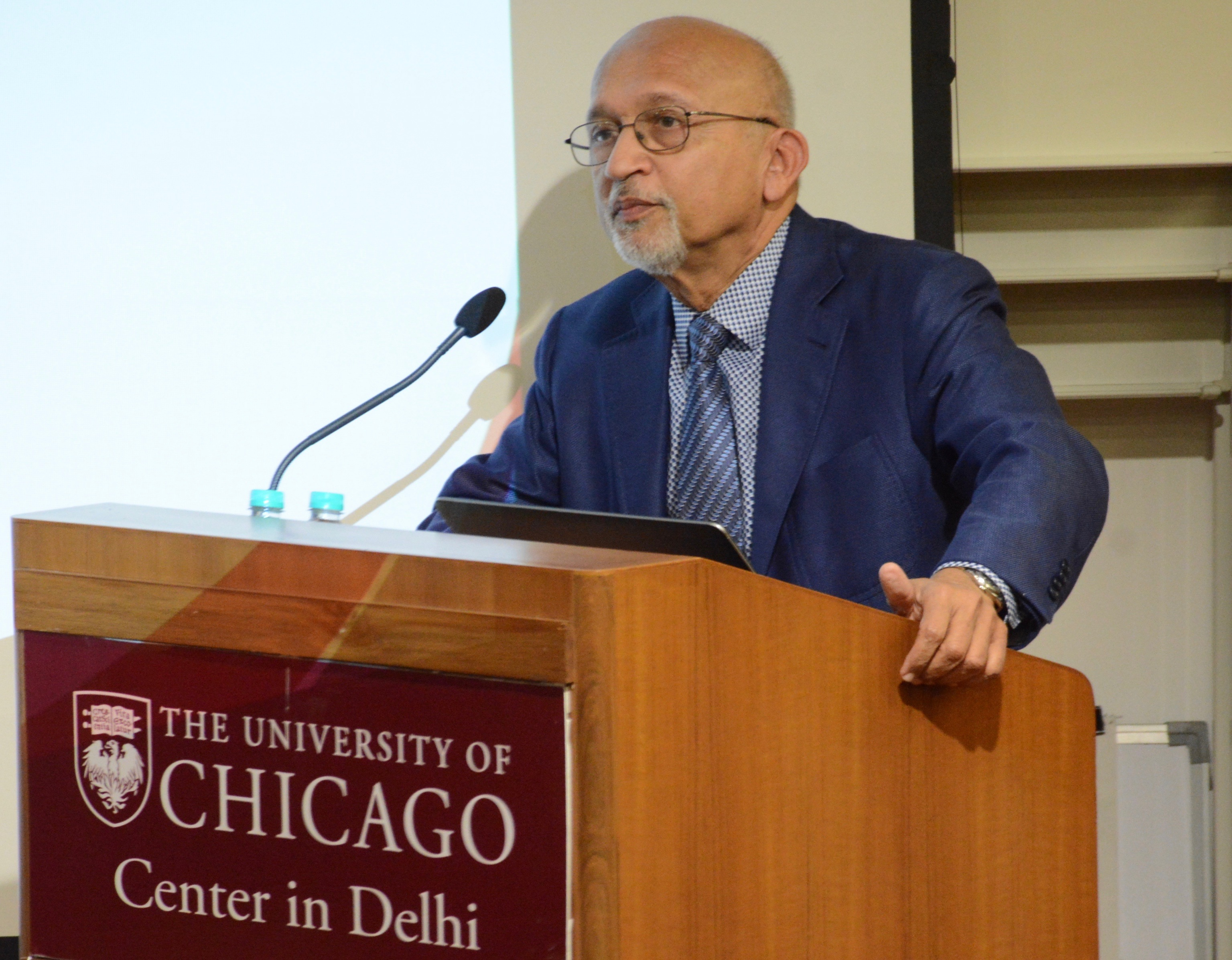
- Born: 1944 (age 81–82); Okara, Punjab, British India
- Education: Government Medical College, Amritsar; All India Institute of Medical Sciences, New Delhi
- Known for: Robbins and Cotran Pathologic Basis of Disease and discovery of natural killer cells
- Scientific career
- Fields: Medicine, Pathologist
- Workplaces: University of Chicago, Pritzker School of Medicine
- Doctoral advisor: Dr M G Deo

Vinay Kumar (Born Dec 24, 1944, Okara) is the Lowell T. Coggeshall Distinguished Service Professor of Pathology at the University of Chicago, where he was also the Chairman (2000-2016) of the Department of Pathology. He is a recipient of Life Time Achievement Award by National Board of Examinations.

== Biography ==
Dr. Vinay Kumar was born in a town named Okara, about 100 miles southwest from Lahore in British India (now Pakistan) on December 24, 1944. He graduated with honors, at the age of 17, from Savitribai Phule Pune University. He earned his MBBS in 1967, at the age of 22, from Glancy Medical College (present day Government Medical College, Amritsar), where he was named "Best Medical Graduate" of that year, winning the Pfizer Award and the gold medal for highest achievement as a medical student. He completed both his PhD in experimental pathology and his residency in anatomic pathology and hematology in 1972 at the All India Institute of Medical Sciences, New Delhi, where he was awarded the Khanolkar Prize for outstanding research in pathology.

He was one of the inaugural co-editors of the Annual Review of Pathology: Mechanisms of Disease in 2006. He has been the senior editor of the pathology reference book Robbins and Cotran Pathologic Basis of Disease co-edited with Dr. Abul K. Abbas.

Since 2003, Kumar is a Fellow of the American Association for the Advancement of Science (AAAS).

He is credited with the discovery of Natural killer (NK) cells in immunology.

== Awards and honours ==
- 2018: The Gold-Headed Cane Award by the American Society for Investigative Pathology
- 2014: Life Time Achievement Award by National Board of Examinations
- 2009: American Society for Investigative Pathology (ASIP) Robbins Distinguished Educator Award

== Selected books ==
- Kumar, V.; Abbas, A.; Aster, J., eds. (2020). Robbins & Cotran Pathologic Basis of Disease - 10th Edition (10th ed.). Elsevier. ISBN 978-0-323-53113-9.
