= Sankat Mochan Sangeet Samaroh =

Sankat Mochan Sangeet Samaroh is an annual music festival held at the Sankat Mochan Hanuman Temple in Varanasi, India. It features performances in Indian classical music and dance. The festival is noted for allowing free entry to audiences, and for performers not charging any fees. It is scheduled every year to coincide with the Hindu religious festival of Hanuman Jayanti that celebrates the birth of Hanuman, the presiding deity at the temple.
