= Somen Debnath =

Indian activist for HIV / AIDS awareness

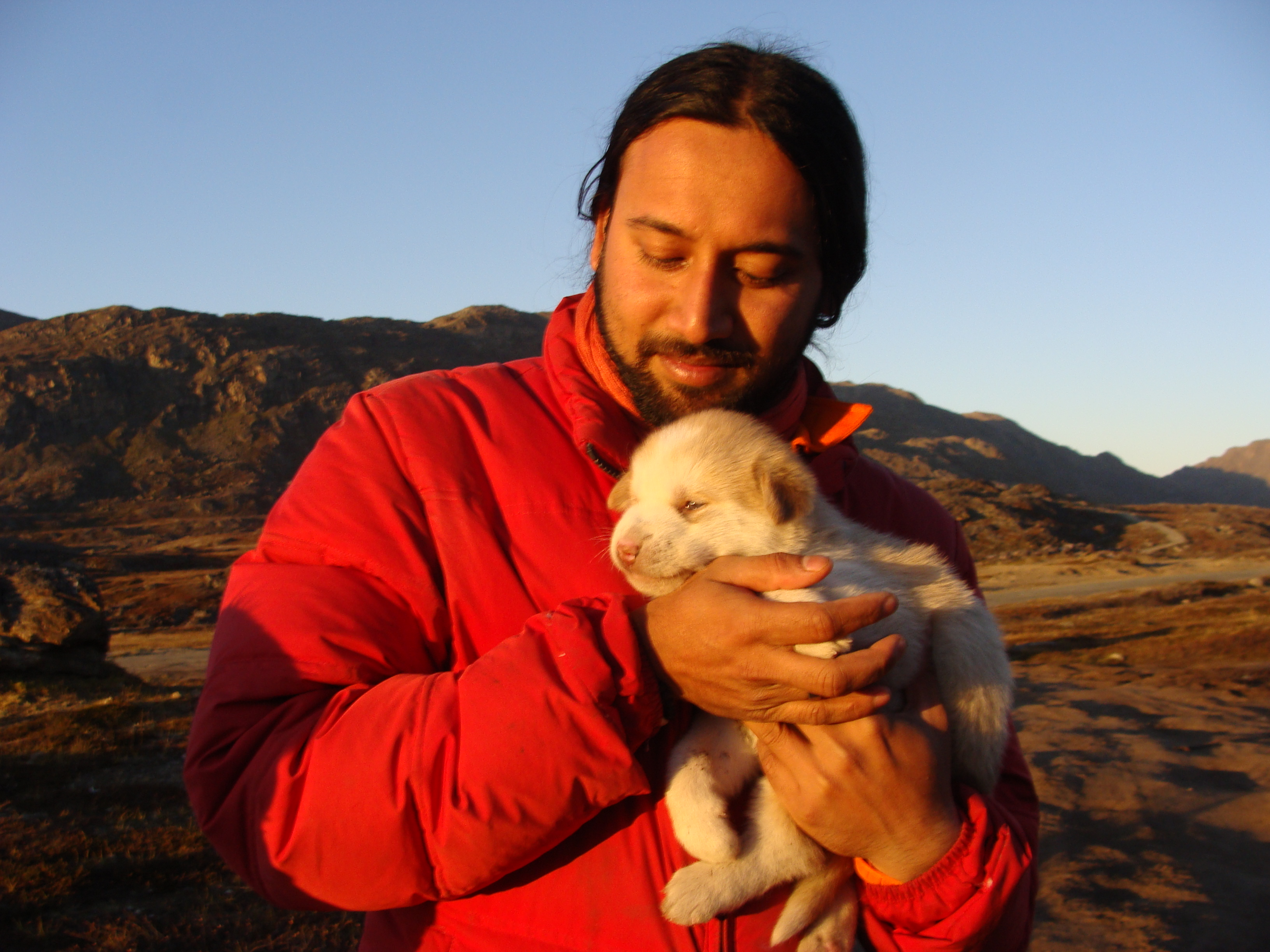
- Debnath in 2011
- Born: Somen Debnath; 8 May 1983 (age 43); Basanti, South 24 Parganas in Sundarbans, West Bengal,
- Education: Bsc Zoology from University of Calcutta
- Occupations: activist, for HIV / AIDS awareness, on bicycle, currently travelling around the world on bicycle
- Parent(s): Son of Shova Debnath and Ram Mohan Debnath
- Website: https://www.somen2020world.com/

Somen Debnath (Bengali: সোমেন দেবনাথ) (born 8 May 1983) is an Indian activist for HIV/AIDS awareness. He has travelled around the world on bicycle with the purpose to promote a program entitled "Around the World on Bicycle Tour for HIV/AIDS Awareness and Seminars on Indian Culture 2004-2020".

== Biography ==
Somen Debnath, son of Shova Debnath and of Ram Mohan Debnath, is a resident of the village Basanti, South 24 Parganas in Sundarbans, West Bengal, India. He studied Zoology, Geology & Anthropology at the University of Calcutta and has a degree in Fine Arts from the Sarba Bhartiya University.

At the age of 16 he enrolled for specialty training at West Bengal State AIDS Control Society. Consequently, he became an activist for HIV/AIDS awareness and he started doing voluntary and charity work, first in his village and then in all Indian provinces

== Around the world on a bicycle (2004-2020) ==
On 27 May 2004, Debnath started a global tour with the goal to visit every country by 2020, spreading a message of HIV / AIDS awareness and social inclusion. He gives lectures in schools, universities, NGOs, and other institutions, with Noble mission, Youth on a cycling mission. A global tour with a mission. Indian cyclist reaches Qatar on 200,000 km trip Somen Debnath 200 000 kilómetros. The focus of Debnath's program is on "underprivileged people, urban, rural and tribal population worldwide who have the lowest level of awareness about this deadly disease."

During his travels in Afghanistan in 2009 he was held captive for 24 days by the Taliban.

As of June 2015 Debnath had travelled to 102 countries. By March 2018 Debnath had covered 146 countries covering South America and was crossing San Salvador in Central America. Taliban and Syrian conflict no problem for Indian round-the-world cyclist. Indian man touring the world on a bicycle for Aids awareness. Touring the world on a bicycle. Indian cyclist on world tour to raise awareness on Aids arrives in Zimbabwe. He once visited IIS Jubail ,indian embassy school in Saudi Arabia during December 2022

On a mission to save the world. World cyclist visits Cape. 1 Bicycle, 12 Years, 1,37,900 km, 126 Countries: This Man Is Spreading HIV Awareness in the World! INDIAN CYCLIST SPREADING HIV AWARENESS. 16 year long bicycle ride for HIV/AIDS awareness rolls in Saint Lucia. Around the Globe in 16 Years. Somen Debnath Visits Houston on his World Bicycle Tour for HIV/AIDS and Indian Culture. Le Journal De Quebec News(French) Quebac City, Canada. Indian traveller arrives in St. Petersburg, having visited 150 countries, 4 Dec 2019Indian traveller arrives in St. Petersburg, having visited 150 countries, 4 Dec 2019 Indian Somen Debnath traveling across Mongolia
