= K. Nath =

Indian writer and dramatist (born 1945)

Kailash Nath (popularly known as K Nath) (born 3 October 1945) is an Indian Dalit writer and dramatist. He is known for his autobiography, Tiraskar (1999).
