= Lokenath Debnath =

Indian American mathematician (1935–2023)

- Born: Lokenath Debnath; September 30, 1935; Bengal Presidency, British India
- Died: March 2, 2023 (aged 87); Weslaco, Texas, U.S.
- Education: University of Calcutta; University of London
- Children: Jayanta Debnath
- Scientific career
- Fields: Mathematical Physics
- Workplaces: University of Central Florida; University of Texas Rio Grande Valley
- Thesis: Transient Wave Motions in Fluids (1967)
- Doctoral advisor: Simon Rosenblat

Lokenath Debnath (September 30, 1935 – March 2, 2023) was an Indian-American mathematician.

== Biography ==
Debnath was born on September 30, 1935, in India. He received both Masters and a doctorate degree from University of Calcutta in Pure Mathematics in 1965. He obtained a Ph.D. in Applied Mathematics at University of London in 1967. His doctoral advisor was Simon Rosenblat. He was a professor of mathematics at University of Texas Rio Grande Valley. He was a professor at University of Central Florida from 1983 to 2001.

Debnath was a founder of the mathematical journal International Journal of Mathematics and Mathematical Sciences. He died on March 2, 2023, at the age of 87.

== Publications ==
=== Books ===
- Debnath, L., Shah F.A. (2015). Wavelet Transforms and Their Applications. Birkhäuser. ISBN 978-0817684174.
- Yang, B., Debnath, L. (2014). Half-Discrete Hilbert-Type Inequalities. World Scientific Publishing Company. ISBN 978-9814504973.
- Debnath, L. (2012). Nonlinear Partial Differential Equations for Scientists and Engineers. Birkhäuser. ISBN 978-0817682644.
- Debnath, L. (2009). The Legacy of Leonhard Euler: A Tricentennial Tribute. Imperial College Press. ISBN 978-1848165250.
- Debnath, L. (2008). Sir James Lighthill And Modern Fluid Mechanics. Icp. ASIN B00LX9SRRK.
- Debnath, L., Bhatta, D. (2006). Integral Transforms and Their Applications. Chapman and Hall/CRC. ISBN 978-1584885757.
- Myint-U, T., Debnath, L. (2006). Linear Partial Differential Equations for Scientists and Engineers. Birkhäuser. ISBN 978-0817643935.
- Debnath, L., Mikusinski, P. (2005). Introduction to Hilbert Spaces with Applications. Academic Press. ISBN 978-0122084386.
- Debnath, L. (2003). Wavelet Transforms & Signal Processing. Birkhäuser. ISBN 978-0683300871.
- Debnath, L. (2001). Wavelet Transforms and Time-Frequency Signal Analysis. Springer Science & Business Media. ISBN 9780817641047.
- Debnath, L., Riahi D.N. (1998). Nonlinear instability, chaos and turbulence. WIT Press/Computational Mechanics Publications. ISBN 9781853125157.
- Debnath, L. (1994). Nonlinear Water Waves. Elsevier. ASIN B000OHRU98.
- Chandrasekharaiah D.S., Debnath, L. (1994). Continuum Mechanics. Academic Press. ISBN 9780121678807.
