= Nath Í =

Nath Í, an early Irish personal name for males, may refer to:

- Nath Í mac Fiachrach, 5th-century legendary king of Connacht
- Nath Í of Cúl Fothirbe, saint of the Dál Messin Corb of Leinster (fl. 6th century)
- Nath Í of Achonry, saint in present-day Co. Sligo, Connacht (fl. 6th century)
