= Methods (journal) =

Peer-reviewed scientific journal

- Discipline: Life sciences, biochemistry
- Language: English
- Edited by: Kenneth W. Adolph

Publication details
- History: 1990-present
- Publisher: Elsevier
- Frequency: 18/year
- Impact factor: 4.647 (2021)

Standard abbreviations
- ISO 4: Methods

Indexing
- CODEN: MTHDE9
- ISSN: 1046-2023 (print); 1095-9130 (web)
- LCCN: 91649237
- OCLC no.: 20349833

Links
- Journal homepage; Online access

Methods is a peer-reviewed scientific journal covering research on techniques in the experimental biological and medical sciences.

It absorbed two journals, ImmunoMethods and NeuroProtocols.

== Abstracting and indexing ==
The journal is abstracted and indexed in EMBASE, EMBiology, and Scopus. According to the Journal Citation Reports, the journal has a 2021 impact factor of 4.647.
