= American Board of Pathology =

One of 24 member boards of the American Board of Medical Specialties

- Abbreviation: ABPath
- Formation: 1936
- Founded at: Chicago, IL
- Headquarters: Tampa, FL
- Chief Executive Officer: Dr. Gary Procop
- Chief Operating Officer: Ty McCarthy
- Website: abpath.org

The American Board of Pathology (ABPath) is one of 24 member boards of the American Board of Medical Specialties. This organization was assembled in May 1936, under the approval of the Advisory Board for Medical Specialties (ABMS) and the American Medical Association (AMA) Council on Medical Education and Hospitals. It is the duty of the ABPath to grant certification in Anatomic Pathology, Clinical Pathology and/or Anatomic/Neuropathology to qualified Doctors of Medicine and Doctors of Osteopathic Medicine (M.D./D.O.).

ABPath Mission Statement

The mission of the American Board of Pathology, a member of the American Board of Medical Specialties, is to serve the public and advance the profession of pathology by setting certification standards and promoting lifelong competency of pathologists.

== Primary and Subspecialty certificates ==
The ABPath issues Primary certificates in:

- Anatomic and Clinical Pathology.
- Anatomic Pathology
- Clinical Pathology
- Anatomic Pathology/Neuropathology.

The ABPath issues Subspecialty certificates in:

- Blood Banking/Transfusion Medicine
- Chemical Pathology
- Clinical Informatics
- Cytopathology
- Dermatology
- Forensic Pathology
- Hematopathology
- Medical Microbiology
- Molecular Genetic Pathology
- Neuropathology
- Pediatric Pathology

== Board certification ==
For physicians to receive ABPath certification, they must:

1. have obtained a medical degree from an accredited medical school within the US or Canada. Exceptions are made for medical schools outside of the US or Canada at the discretion of the board.
2. have full and unrestricted medical licensure in a state or jurisdiction within the US or Canada.
3. completed a residency/training program in pathology or pathology subspecialty that is accredited by the Accreditation Council for Graduate Medical Education (ACGME) or the Royal College of Physicians and Surgeons of Canada (RCPSC).
4. passed required examinations; computer based examinations with combined written and practical sections and for some exams Virtual Microscopy.

Examinations

The American Board of Pathology administers two "primary examinations": one examination in anatomic pathology and one in clinical pathology, where candidates pursuing combined certification are required to take both. Both examinations are in multiple-choice format with one best answer for each question.

== Continuing Certification ==
A physician who is board certified is recognized as a diplomate; one who has medical specialty expertise. To maintain this precedence, the physician must participate in the ABPath's program for Continuing Certification (CC). This program has a four-part framework that emphasizes 1) Professionalism and Professional Standing, 2) Lifelong Learning and Self-Assessment, 3) Assessment of Knowledge, Judgment, and Skills, and 4) Improvement in Medical Practice. This framework is used to evaluate:

1. Practice-based Learning and Improvement
2. Patient Care and Procedural Skills
3. Systems-based Practice
4. Medical Knowledge
5. Interpersonal and Communication Skills
6. Professionalism

All member boards under the ABMS have this four-part framework and these six core competencies as bases for their MOC programs.

== See also ==
- American Society for Investigative Pathology
- American Society of Cytopathology
- College of American Pathologists
- United States and Canadian Academy of Pathology
