= Abul K. Abbas =

American pathologist

Abul K Abbas
- ابو ال کے عباس
- Born: 1 June 1947 (age 79); India
- Education: All India Institute of Medical Sciences, New Delhi
- Known for: Robbins and Cotran Pathologic Basis of Disease
- Awards: Elected to Institute of Medicine, National Academy of Sciences, fellow of American Academy of Arts and Sciences
- Scientific career
- Fields: Medicine, Pathologist, Immunology
- Workplaces: University of California San Francisco, Harvard Medical School

Abul K. Abbas (Urdu: ابو ال کے عباس born 1 June 1947) is an Indian born-American pathologist at University of California San Francisco where he is Distinguished Professor in Pathology and former chair of its Department of Pathology. He is senior editor of the pathology reference book Robbins and Cotran Pathologic Basis of Disease along with Vinay Kumar, as well as Basic Immunology, and Cellular & Molecular Immunology. He was editor for Immunity from 1993 to 1996, and continues to serve as a member of the editorial board. He was one of the inaugural co-editors of the Annual Review of Pathology: Mechanisms of Disease for issues from 2006 to 2020. He has published nearly 200 scientific papers.

== Selected books ==
- Kumar V, Abbas A, Aster J, editors. Robbins & Cotran Pathologic Basis of Disease. 10th Ed. Elsevier 2020. ISBN 978-0-323-53113-9
- Kumar V, Abbas A, Aster J, editors. Robbins Essential Pathology. 1st Ed. Elsevier 2020. ISBN 978-0-323-64025-1

== Awards and honors ==
- 2021: ASIP Gold-Headed Cane Award, American Society for Investigative Pathology (ASIP)
- 2010: ASIP Robbins Distinguished Educator Award, ASIP
