= Doctor of Clinical Laboratory Science =

The Doctor of Clinical Laboratory Science (DCLS) is a professional degree in clinical laboratory science in the United States for medical laboratory scientists. The DCLS is board eligible and qualifies as a CLIA high complexity laboratory director (HCLD). Doctors of Clinical Laboratory Science may conduct research or serve on healthcare teams. DCLS work closely with physicians, catching pre- analytical, analytical, and post-analytical test and interpretation errors in order to ensure optimal patient care outcomes. Doctors of Clinical Laboratory Science complete a residency at the end of their training.

There are four programs:

- Rutgers, New Jersey
- University of Texas Medical Branch, Galveston, Texas
- University of Kansas, Kansas
- University of Cincinnati

== See also ==
- Pathologist
- Scientist
