= Hematopathology =

Study of blood diseases and disorders

Hematopathologist
Occupation
- Names: Physician; Scientist
- Occupation type: Specialty
- Activity sectors: Medicine

Description
- Education required: Doctor of Medicine (M.D.); Doctor of Osteopathic medicine (D.O.); Doctor of Clinical Laboratory Science (DCLS); Bachelor of Medicine, Bachelor of Surgery (M.B.B.S.); Bachelor of Medicine, Bachelor of Surgery (MBChB); Doctor of Pharmacy (Pharm.D.)
- Fields of employment: Hospitals, Clinics

Hematopathology or hemopathology (both also spelled haem-, see spelling differences) is the study of diseases and disorders affecting and found in blood cells, their production, and any organs and tissues involved in hematopoiesis, such as bone marrow, the spleen, and the thymus. Diagnoses and treatment of diseases such as leukemia and lymphoma often deal with hematopathology; techniques and technologies include flow cytometry studies and immunohistochemistry.

In the United States, hematopathology is a board-certified subspecialty by the American Board of Pathology. Board-eligible or board-certified hematopathologists are usually pathology residents (anatomic, clinical, or combined) who have completed hematopathology fellowship training after their pathology residency. The hematopathology fellowship lasts either one or two years. A physician who practices hematopathology is called a hematopathologist.
