= Collaborations (Ravi Shankar and George Harrison album) =

Box set by Ravi Shankar & George Harrison
- Released: 18 October 2010
- Recorded: 1973–74, 1996
- Genres: Indian classical music; jazz; world music
- Length: 159:52 (CDs); 65:56 (DVD feature); 96:49 (DVD audio)
- Label: Dark Horse
- Producer: George Harrison
- Compiler: Olivia Harrison

George Harrison chronology
Let It Roll: Songs by George Harrison (2009)	Collaborations (2010)	Early Takes: Volume 1 (2012)

Collaborations is a four-disc compilation box set by the Indian classical musician Ravi Shankar and the former Beatle George Harrison. Released in October 2010 on Dark Horse Records, it compiles two studio albums originally issued on that label – the long-unavailable Shankar Family & Friends (1974) and Ravi Shankar's Music Festival from India (1976) – and Chants of India, first issued on Angel Records in 1997. Although all three albums were originally Shankar releases, for which Harrison served in the role of music producer and guest musician, both Shankar and Harrison are credited as artists on the box set. Each of the collaborative projects represents a departure from Shankar's more typical work as a sitarist and performer of Hindustani classical ragas, with the box set showcasing his forays into, variously, jazz and rock, Indian folk and orchestral ensembles, and devotional music.

The fourth disc of Collaborations is a DVD containing previously unissued film of a performance by the Music Festival from India, recorded at London's Royal Albert Hall in September 1974. Filmed by director Stuart Cooper, the footage required substantial restoration for its 2010 release. An audio-only track on the DVD, prepared by Anoushka Shankar and Paul Hicks, provides a more complete record of the concert.

Issued nine years after Harrison's death, the limited-edition release coincided with celebrations for Shankar's 90th birthday and was overseen by Harrison's widow, Olivia. Among the lavish packaging for the compilation, each disc appears inside enlarged, 8½-inch sleeves, and each copy of the set is individually numbered. An accompanying book contains a foreword by American composer Philip Glass, rare photographs documenting Shankar and Harrison's 35-year friendship, and commentary from both artists on the projects featured in the box set. While Collaborations presents only a portion of Shankar and Harrison's work together, music critics have recognised it as a successful representation of the far-reaching cultural legacy of their partnership.

== Background ==
In June 1966, while still a member of the Beatles, George Harrison met Indian classical musician Ravi Shankar in London and became a student of the sitarist. Harrison later said that, for himself, the music was "like an excuse", and that in reality he was searching for a "spiritual connection" with the culture of India. The association immediately brought Shankar and Indian music unprecedented popularity in the West, while Harrison's introduction of the sitar into the Beatles' sound inspired a new genre known as raga rock. By 1971, a year after the Beatles' break-up, and having established himself as a solo artist with his All Things Must Pass triple album (1970), Harrison began working with Shankar, as his producer. These 1971 projects, all released on the Beatles' Apple record label, included the soundtrack to the documentary film Raga; Shankar's Joi Bangla EP, recorded to raise international awareness for the plight of refugees of the Bangladesh Liberation War; and the live album The Concert for Bangladesh, which documented the UNICEF benefit concerts that Harrison and Shankar staged in New York that August. (Note: The last of Shankar's releases on Apple, the In Concert 1972 double live album, recorded with his regular jugalbandi partner Ali Akbar Khan, was also produced by Harrison.)

Twenty-three years older than Harrison, Shankar described their relationship as, variously, that of father and son (with each one adopting either role); close friends and brothers; and teacher and student. Author Ian Inglis has commented on the various differences between the two musicians, in terms of age, culture and social status: "And yet, in another sense, those contrasting factors helped to prevent any personal or professional rivalries, produced spaces and separations that their music could fill, and ultimately created … a partnership that was never competitive, but perfectly complementary." While their collaborations continued only intermittently after the mid 1970s, the depth of their friendship remained, such that Harrison would credit Shankar as being "the person who has influenced my life the most". When Harrison died in November 2001, following a four-year battle with cancer, Shankar was at his bedside, along with members of Harrison's family.

== Musical content ==
The 2010 box set Collaborations was one of several reissue projects celebrating Shankar's 90th birthday. It compiles three studio albums that he and Harrison worked on together between 1973 and 1996: Shankar Family & Friends (1974), Ravi Shankar's Music Festival from India (1976) and Chants of India (1997). The first two of these albums had long been out of print, and their inclusion in the box set marked the debut CD release for both titles. Disc four contains a previously unissued concert film from 1974, titled Music Festival from India – Live at the Royal Albert Hall.

Harrison's role on the three studio albums was mainly confined to that of a record producer, although his name appeared prominently on the front cover of Chants of India, and the latter was marketed as a collaborative work between Shankar and Harrison. Collaborations presents the albums in reverse chronological order, with Chants of India appearing on disc one.

=== Chants of India ===
Chants of India is the most vivid in my mind. It was fascinating to witness the creation of that album ... The priority was to maintain the integrity of the mantras and verses, while setting them to music as timeless as the words.

— Olivia Harrison, compilation producer, 2010

Shankar and Harrison recorded the album between January and August 1996, with sessions taking place in the southern India city of Madras, and at Harrison's English home, Friar Park, in Henley-on-Thames. The majority of the selections consist of Vedic prayers and other Sanskrit-worded, Hindu religious texts that Shankar set to music. He also wrote new pieces in a similarly sacred vein, including "Prabhujee", the only song on the album to contain Hindi lyrics. Among the many musicians and singers on Chants of India were Shankar's daughter Anoushka, tablist Bikram Ghosh and santoor player Tarun Bhattacharya.

The album's creation resulted from Shankar and Harrison having renewed their close friendship in recent years; this following a period when, by his own admission, Shankar had partially withdrawal from his Western-musician friends in the late 1970s, stung by persistent criticism from the Indian press that he was "diluting" Indian classical music. Other projects that the pair undertook together in the mid 1990s include Ravi Shankar: In Celebration (1996), a four-disc career retrospective compiled by Harrison, and Raga Mala, Shankar's second autobiography, for which Harrison served as editor. (Note: Among their occasional collaborations during the intervening years, Shankar wrote a piece titled "Dhani" as a tribute to Harrison's newborn son in 1978, which Shankar, Harrison and Alla Rakha taped at Friar Park, and the two musicians recorded the instrumental "Friar Park" in 1986 for Shankar's album Tana Mana. In addition, Shankar contributed a sitar part to Harrison's Indian-styled song "Ride Rajbun", recorded in 1988 for the children's animated TV series The Bunbury Tails.)

Shankar considered Chants of India to be among his best works, and he praised Harrison's contributions as a musician and producer on the album. Released on Angel Records in May 1997, the album was critically well received. In his book The Dawn of Indian Music in the West, Peter Lavezzoli describes it as "a quiet masterpiece, one of the most uplifting and musically engaging recordings of sacred music", while AllMusic critic Jim Brenholts writes: "Among records of this nature, this one is special." Chants of India was the last official musical collaboration between the two artists, after Harrison was diagnosed with cancer in August that year.

=== Ravi Shankar's Music Festival from India ===
The Music Festival from India was something I've been planning since about '67. It was inspired by an incredible orchestral composition Ravi created around 1964 for All India Radio.

— George Harrison, 1974

Harrison first got the idea to stage what became the 1974 Music Festival from India during the Bombay sessions for his debut solo album, the 1968 film soundtrack Wonderwall Music, after hearing Shankar's orchestral work Nava Rasa Ranga. While in India in early 1974, Shankar and Harrison planned the venture, which consisted of a European tour by Shankar's hand-picked orchestra of Indian classical musicians, after which the ensemble would tour North America with Harrison and his band of Western musicians. For his orchestra, Shankar selected regular accompanists such as tabla player Alla Rakha and singers Lakshmi Shankar and Kamala Chakravarty; other established players including Shivkumar Sharma (santoor), Hariprasad Chaurasia (flute), Rijram Desad (percussion) and Kamalesh Maitra (tabla tarang); and musicians that went on to establish themselves internationally as a result of their participation, such as violinist L. Subramaniam and sarangi player Sultan Khan.

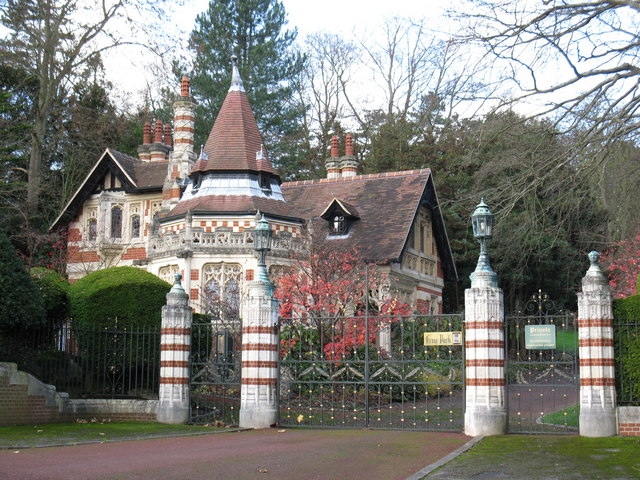
The entrance to Harrison's property Friar Park, where two of the albums featured in the box set were recorded; photo by Don Cload

Before the European tour began in September 1974, Shankar and Harrison recorded a studio album with the sixteen Music Festival musicians at Friar Park. Using the facilities from his upstairs studio, FPSHOT, Harrison recorded the album in Friar Park's drawing room, overlooking the property's expansive gardens. (Note: The same arrangement was employed during the sessions for Chants of India 22 years later.) Shankar wrote the pieces in a variety of traditional Indian folk and classical styles, often composing on his way to Henley from his London hotel, while travelling along the M4 motorway. Harrison later recalled his fear that Shankar's directions to the assembled musicians would create a musical "catastrophe", yet the result each time was "the most amazing thing". Among the tracks on Ravi Shankar's Music Festival from India, "Raga Jait" is Shankar's interpretation of that raga for an orchestral ensemble, and the ten-minute "Dehati" features extended interplay between the various percussionists. The album was released on Harrison's Dark Horse record label in February 1976.

=== Shankar Family & Friends ===
The album contains almost every possible style that you can think of … we have Western instruments like sax, guitar, bass … a few classical musicians from the Los Angeles Symphony Orchestra, and I had three musicians flown in from Bombay.

— Ravi Shankar, 2010

Shankar and Harrison began recording Shankar Family & Friends in Los Angeles in April 1973. In a marked departure from Shankar's more familiar work in the Hindustani classical style, the album was a fusion of several musical genres, particularly Indian classical, jazz and Western pop. The contributors ranged from American jazz proponents Tom Scott and Emil Richards to Indian players such as Rakha, Sharma, Chaurasia, Subramaniam, sarodiya Aashish Khan and, a former student and longtime associate of Shankar's, multi-instrumentalist Harihar Rao. Adopting the pseudonym "Hari Georgeson", since he was still contracted to EMI-affiliated Apple Records, Harrison contributed on electric and acoustic guitars, and autoharp. Shankar played sitar, surbahar and Moog synthesizer, and otherwise served as director and conductor at the sessions. Other participants included guitarist David Bromberg, members of the Los Angeles Symphony Orchestra, and electronic music artists Paul Beaver and Robert Margouleff.

One side of the original LP consisted of music that Shankar had composed for a ballet, titled Dream, Nightmare & Dawn, while among the album's other songs and bhajans was a rare English-language pop composition by Shankar, "I Am Missing You". Harrison arranged the latter track in a rock-music setting, with backing from Western musicians such as Scott, Billy Preston, Ringo Starr and Jim Keltner; sung by Lakshmi Shankar, this version of "I Am Missing You" was the first single released on Dark Horse Records, in September 1974. Music from Shankar Family & Friends featured in the setlist for the Harrison–Shankar North American tour later that year, during which the Music Festival personnel were accompanied on stage by Harrison and members of his touring band, such as Scott and Richards.

=== Music Festival from India – Live at the Royal Albert Hall ===
Harrison sponsored Shankar's Music Festival from India concerts through his Material World Charitable Foundation, for which the European tour was its debut event. The DVD issued on Collaborations is from the Music Festival's concert at the Royal Albert Hall, London, on 23 September 1974, the first date of the tour. The footage was shot by director Stuart Cooper, whose film Little Malcolm, made early the previous year, marked Harrison's first foray into film production.

After Harrison introduces Shankar to the London audience, Shankar conducts the musicians during the performance. He plays sitar on the twenty-minute "Raga Yaman Kalyan", however, accompanied by Rakha. Author Simon Leng recognises the Music Festival from India as the first Indian orchestra to have played in Europe, (Note: In 1968, Shankar had toured the United States and recorded with a thirteen-piece "Festival from India" orchestra. The personnel included Alla Rakha, Lakshmi Shankar, Kamala Chakravarty and Shivkumar Sharma from the 1974 ensemble, together with Jitendra Abhisheki, Aashish Khan and Palghat Raghu, all of whom played on Shankar Family & Friends five years later.) while Harrison's widow Olivia, in her role as producer of the compilation, notes singer and mridangam player T.V. Gopalkrishnan among the musicians who went on to have "incredible careers of their own".

Considerable restoration was required to prepare Live at the Royal Albert Hall for release in 2010, since much of Cooper's footage had been lost during the ensuing decades or damaged. Olivia Harrison explained: "We laid music where we had picture and we cheated a little bit with picture where only sound existed to create over an hour of the concert …" A separate selection on the DVD presents the audio for a more complete version of the performance, lasting over 90 minutes. Also included is a short segment where Anoushka Shankar and Paul Hicks, as remaster producers, work on the concert audio in a San Diego studio and are visited by Shankar and Olivia.

== Artwork and packaging ==
Collaborations was presented in an unusually lavish package, designed by Drew Lorimer and Olivia Harrison. Housed in a hinged box, the four discs sit on cardboard bases inside album covers measuring 8½ by 8½ inches, with the enlargement from CD and DVD dimensions allowing for a closer replication of the original LP jackets. A limited-edition release, each copy of the box set came with an individually numbered certificate of authenticity.

A 56-page, hardcover book contains quotes from Shankar and Harrison, commenting on their long friendship and the projects represented on the discs. Both artists' families supplied photographs for the book, while other pictures are credited to professional photographers Clive Arrowsmith, Dezo Hoffmann, Jan Steward and Carolyn Jones. The photo used on the front of the box was one of a series of pictures that Arrowsmith took at Friar Park in 1974, over the period when the Music Festival orchestra were recording and rehearsing there.

The book's foreword was supplied by American composer Philip Glass, with whom Shankar had collaborated on the 1990 album Passages. Glass writes of the Shankar–Harrison musical partnership as having "[made] waves ... on a tremendous scale and for a passionate worldwide audience", adding that its influence "reverberates, as clearly, even today".

== Release ==
The box set was issued on Dark Horse Records, distributed by Rhino Entertainment, on 18 October 2010 in Britain, and 19 October in the United States. Announcing the release in August that year, Consequence of Sound described it as "a certified dream for world music/Beatles fans". Collaborations coincided with East Meets West Music's Shankar reissues such as the Nine Decades series and the DVD release of the long-unavailable Raga, which features 1968 footage of Harrison as well as the soundtrack he produced and originally issued on Apple. In America, the box set was available solely through Harrison's official website and the online retailer Amazon. At this time the Harrison estate undertook a similarly low-key campaign for the 40th anniversary of All Things Must Pass, which coincided with several reissue projects relating to the Beatles.

Collaborations entered Billboard magazine's Top World Albums list at number 3, its peak position on that chart. Having been Harrison's assistant at Dark Horse during the 1970s, Olivia Harrison promoted the release; in an interview with Spinner, she described the reissue project as a "labor of love for me".

== Reception ==
Professional ratings
Review scores
Source	Rating
AllMusic	4/5 stars
Goldmine	5/5 stars
Mojo	4/5 stars
PopMatters	9/10 stars
Record Collector	3/5 stars
The Second Disc	(favourable)
Uncut	4/5 stars

In a five-star review for Goldmine magazine, Gillian Gaar considered that Collaborations "succeeded on crossover appeal" and had praise for the "mesmerizing" Music Festival album and concert DVD. Reviewing the box set for Uncut, John Lewis found Harrison "a little too respectful" in his deference to Shankar on the 1970s projects, although he admired Chants of India, saying: "there is a heaviness and intensity to each performance that makes this seemingly austere collection quite compelling to rock ears."

Terry Staunton of Record Collector commented that had John Lennon and Paul McCartney ceded more of their creative control in the Beatles to Harrison, "there might today be a stronger case for Ravi Shankar's claim to the fiercely-debated position of fifth Beatle." Staunton described Collaborations as an "intriguing series of East–West summits" and concluded: "It may have limited appeal … but this box set is a strong testament to two friends' mutual respect and their desire to push musical boundaries." In an article for Time Out New York on the various Beatles-related reissues of late 2010, Sophie Harris wrote: "You might not think that Vedic chanting is your thing, but as Philip Glass notes in the introduction to this gorgeous set, there's scarcely a musician in the world who hasn't been touched by the musical partnership [between Shankar and Harrison] … Contained herein: awesome, spooky-sounding chanting, a live DVD, a glossy book and much more to rejoice about."

While also comparing the collection to the more highly publicised reissues by Lennon and McCartney, Joe Marchese of The Second Disc praised Collaborations for its adventurous music, as well as the lavishness of the packaging. Of the three studio albums, he described Shankar Family & Friends as the "most commercial" and Music Festival from India as "exotic, but immediately transporting", and wrote that "joy and a celebratory feel exudes from [Chants of India]". Marchese added: "[The] albums illuminate an important aspect of the career of George Harrison, for sure. But they also remind one of the immense musical influence of Ravi Shankar ... These once hard-to-find LPs are presented with great integrity here."

Writing for AllMusic, Richie Unterberger qualifies the joint credit afforded Shankar and Harrison, saying: "Without downplaying the closeness of the two musicians' friendship and Harrison's genuine participation in all of these projects, it should be stated up front that this is much more Shankar's music than Harrison's, and much more Indian music than the rock for which Harrison was most famed." Unterberger describes the box set as "a bountiful gathering of some of Shankar's more accessible recordings" and highlights Chants of India as the most effective collaboration between the two artists. PopMatters contributor Sachyn Mital described the box set as "a special gift for [Shankar's] fans" on the occasion of his 90th birthday, and "worthy of a man of such esteemed stature". Mital concludes of the partnership: "The diligence of Harrison brought Ravi Shankar, Indian music and Eastern spirituality soundly into Western collective consciousness."

== Track listing ==
Disc one – Chants of India

All selections are traditional, adapted by Ravi Shankar, except where noted.

1. "Vandanaa Trayee" – 4:32
2. "Omkaaraaya Namaha" – 1:53
3. "Vedic Chanting One" – 3:12
4. "Asato Maa" – 7:12
5. "Sahanaa Vavavtu" – 4:26
6. "Poornamadah" – 1:28
7. "Gaayatri" – 3:26
8. "Mahaa Mrityunjaya" – 4:43
9. "Veenaa-Murali" – 3:36
10. "Geetaa" – 2:13
11. "Managalam" (Shankar, Dr Nandakumara) – 4:03
12. "Hari Om" (Shankar) – 2:57
13. "Svara Mantra" (Shankar) – 4:34
14. "Vedic Chanting Two" – 2:13
15. "Prabhujee" (Shankar) – 8:06
16. "Sarve Shaam" – 5:09

Disc two – Ravi Shankar's Music Festival from India

All selections written by Shankar.

1. "Vandana" – 2:44
2. "Dhamar" – 5:23
3. "Tarana / Chaturang" – 5:33
4. "Raga Jait" – 9:48
5. "Kajri" – 4:51
6. "Bhajan" – 3:56
7. "Naderdani" – 4:43
8. "Dehati" – 10:09

Disc three – Shankar Family & Friends

All selections written by Shankar.

1. "I Am Missing You" – 3:45
2. "Kahān Gayelavā Shyām Saloné" – 2:55
3. "Supané Mé Āyé Preetam Sainyā" – 4:15
4. "I Am Missing You (reprise)" – 4:03
5. "Jaya Jagadish Haré" (PD) – 4:54

Dream, Nightmare & Dawn (Music for a Ballet)

6. "Overture" – 2:33

- Part One (Dream):

7. "Festivity & Joy" – 3:56
8. "Love-Dance Ecstasy" – 3:13

- Part Two (Nightmare):

9. "Lust (Rāga Chandrakauns)" – 3:13
10. "Dispute & Violence" – 2:43
11. "Disillusionment & Frustration" – 2:50
12. "Despair & Sorrow (Rāga Marwā)" – 3:04

- Part Three (Dawn):

13. "Awakening" – 3:05
14. "Peace & Hope (Rāga Bhatiyār)" – 4:31

Disc four – Music Festival from India – Live at the Royal Albert Hall

All selections written by Shankar.

Concert film

1. "Introduction by George Harrison"
2. "Hymns from the Vedas"
3. "Tappa (Raga Khamaj)"
4. "Tarana (Raga Kirwani)"
5. "Raga Jait"
6. "Vilambit Gat, Drut Gat and Jhala (Raga Yaman Kalyan)"
7. "Naderdani"
8. "Krishna Krishna Bhajan (based on Raga Pancham-se-gara)"
9. "Dehati"

Concert audio

1. "Musicians Introduction"
2. "Vandana"
3. "Alap / Noom / Toom Jor (Raga Abhogi)"
4. "Dhamar (Raga Vasanta in Tala Dhamar)"
5. "Khyal (Raga Kedara in Tala Teental)"
6. "Tarana (Raga Kirwani in Tala Ektal)"
7. "Chaturang (Raga Yaman Kalyan in Tala Teental)"
8. "Kajri"
9. "Pallavi (Thani Avarthanam / Raga Bilahari in Tala Aditala)"
10. "Thumri (Mishra Piloo in Tala Jat)"
11. "Raga Mala (Garland of Ragas, based on Raga Khamaj in Tala Teental)"

== Sources ==
- Keith Badman, The Beatles Diary Volume 2: After the Break-Up 1970–2001, Omnibus Press (London, 2001; ISBN 0-7119-8307-0).
- Collaborations, book accompanying Collaborations box set (Dark Horse Records, 2010; produced by Olivia Harrison; package design by Drew Lorimer & Olivia Harrison).
- The Editors of Rolling Stone, Harrison, Rolling Stone Press/Simon & Schuster (New York, NY, 2002; ISBN 0-7432-3581-9).
- Walter Everett, The Beatles as Musicians: Revolver Through the Anthology, Oxford University Press (New York, NY, 1999; ISBN 0-19-509553-7).
- Olivia Harrison, George Harrison: Living in the Material World, Abrams (New York, NY, 2011; ISBN 978-1-4197-0220-4).
- Bill Harry, The George Harrison Encyclopedia, Virgin Books (London, 2003; ISBN 978-0753508220).
- Ian Inglis, The Words and Music of George Harrison, Praeger (Santa Barbara, CA, 2010; ISBN 978-0-313-37532-3).
- Peter Lavezzoli, The Dawn of Indian Music in the West, Continuum (New York, NY, 2006; ISBN 0-8264-2819-3).
- Simon Leng, While My Guitar Gently Weeps: The Music of George Harrison, Hal Leonard (Milwaukee, WI, 2006; ISBN 1-4234-0609-5).
- Robert Rodriguez, Fab Four FAQ 2.0: The Beatles' Solo Years, 1970–1980, Backbeat Books (Milwaukee, WI, 2010; ISBN 978-1-4165-9093-4).
- Nicholas Schaffner, The Beatles Forever, McGraw-Hill (New York, NY, 1978; ISBN 0-07-055087-5).
- Ravi Shankar, Raga Mala: The Autobiography of Ravi Shankar, Welcome Rain (New York, NY, 1999; ISBN 1-56649-104-5).
- Michael Simmons, "Cry for a Shadow", Mojo, November 2011, pp. 74–87.
- Gary Tillery, Working Class Mystic: A Spiritual Biography of George Harrison, Quest Books (Wheaton, IL, 2011; ISBN 978-0-8356-0900-5).
- World Music: The Rough Guide (Volume 2: Latin and North America, Caribbean, India, Asia and Pacific), Rough Guides/Penguin (London, 2000; ISBN 1-85828-636-0).
