= I Am Missing You =

- UK picture sleeve

Single by Ravi Shankar

from the album Shankar Family & Friends
- B-side: "Lust"
- Released: 13 September 1974 (UK); 6 November 1974 (US)
- Genre: Folk rock, pop
- Length: 3:40
- Label: Dark Horse
- Songwriter: Ravi Shankar
- Producer: George Harrison

"I Am Missing You (Reprise)"

Song by Ravi Shankar

from the album Shankar Family & Friends
- Published: Anourag Music
- Released: 20 September 1974 (UK); 7 October 1974 (US)
- Genre: Folk
- Length: 4:03
- Label: Dark Horse
- Songwriter: Ravi Shankar
- Producer: George Harrison

"I Am Missing You" is a song by Indian musician Ravi Shankar, sung by his sister-in-law Lakshmi Shankar and released as the lead single from his 1974 album Shankar Family & Friends. The song is a rare Shankar composition in the Western pop genre, with English lyrics, and was written as a love song to the Hindu god Krishna. The recording was produced and arranged by George Harrison, in a style similar to Phil Spector's signature sound, and it was the first single issued on Harrison's Dark Horse record label. Other contributing musicians include Tom Scott, Nicky Hopkins, Billy Preston, Ringo Starr and Jim Keltner. A second version appears on Shankar Family & Friends, titled "I Am Missing You (Reprise)", featuring an arrangement closer to a folk ballad.

Shankar and Harrison performed "I Am Missing You" throughout their North American tour in November–December 1974. As a forerunner to the 1980s world music genre, these live performances of the song brought together Shankar's orchestra of distinguished Indian classical musicians – among them, Hariprasad Chaurasia, Shivkumar Sharma, Alla Rakha, T.V. Gopalkrishnan, L. Subramaniam and Sultan Khan – and Harrison's band of top rock, jazz and funk players. The Harrison-arranged studio version of "I Am Missing You" appeared on Shankar's career-spanning box set Ravi Shankar: In Celebration, released in 1996. Shankar reinterpreted "I Am Missing You" for his 2005 project Jazzmin, featuring Californian jazz musicians and his daughter Anoushka on sitar.

== Background and composition ==
Having trained formally in the Hindustani classical idiom and performed as a sitarist since the 1940s, Ravi Shankar wrote his first Western pop composition, "I Am Missing You", in the early 1970s. Although known primarily as an instrumentalist in the West through his interpretation of Indian ragas, Shankar's previous work in the vocal tradition had included ballet productions for the Indian National Theatre and the Triveni Kala Sangam. More recently, he had recorded two short vocal pieces on his 1971 EP Joi Bangla, released as a benefit disc for refugees of the Bangladesh Liberation War.

Shankar later recalled of the moment he composed "I Am Missing You": "I don't know how I did it, but one day I wrote an English song without thinking …" He played the composition to his friend, ex-Beatle George Harrison, who liked it immediately. Harrison told British DJ Nicky Horne in August 1974: "It just blew my mind, because I heard it from my pop background. I said [to him], 'That's a hit … It's a lovely song – you should write more of these, Ravi.' And he said, 'Oh, you know, I've been trying not to write these for years.'"

Often referred to with the accompanying parenthetical title "(Krishna, Where Are You?)", "I Am Missing You" is a love song dedicated to the Hindu god Krishna. In the choruses, Shankar's words mourn the apparent absence of Krishna from his life, but in the repeated verses he acknowledges: "Though I can't see you / I hear your flute all the while." The latter line reflects the importance of the flute – or bansuri – in the Hindu tradition, since it is the musical instrument most commonly associated with the deity. In his second autobiography, Raga Mala (1997), Shankar describes the words as "a simple lyric that just gushed out of me when I was travelling on a plane". Speaking to journalist Graham Reid in 1998, Shankar recalled: "I think we were travelling somewhere in the States … it was very short, maybe six or eight lines. It came very spontaneously with the tune and I noted it down." In addition to the lyrics being in English rather than Hindi or Bengali, the latter being Shankar's first language, the song's melody follows Western convention, with distinct chord changes instead of the single-chord, monodic drone common to Indian music.

== Recording ==
Shankar recorded "I Am Missing You" for Shankar Family & Friends (1974), his first full studio album with Harrison as his producer. (Note: In 1971, Harrison had produced the soundtrack album to Shankar's documentary Raga, although his involvement was closer to "re-producing", according to author Chip Madinger and Mark Easter. Most of the recordings for Raga dated from the late 1960s, but the film project had encountered financial and technical difficulties since then.) Two recordings of the song were made for the album, since, as Shankar recalled: "George liked it so much he wanted to do a version of his own." For this version, Harrison arranged the song "for a rock band", author Peter Lavezzoli writes, using multiple drummers. The latter was one element of Phil Spector's Wall of Sound technique that Harrison had recently employed on "Don't Let Me Wait Too Long" and other songs on his self-produced Living in the Material World album.

The sessions for Shankar Family & Friends took place at A&M Studios in Los Angeles during April and May 1973, soon after Harrison had recorded contributions to former bandmate Ringo Starr's first rock solo album, Ringo, notably on their joint composition "Photograph". Author Simon Leng suggests that "[i]t must have been a case of déjà vu for Starr" when he attended the Shankar session, due to the similarity in Harrison's musical arrangements for "I Am Missing You" and the equally Spector-influenced "Photograph". Starr played drums on the basic track for "I Am Missing You", while other participants had also recently contributed to Ringo: Nicky Hopkins (piano), Billy Preston (organ), Klaus Voormann (bass) and Jim Keltner (drums).

Shankar's sister-in-law, Lakshmi Shankar, sang the lead vocals, with Shankar himself taking the role of director and conductor, as he did on much of the Los Angeles sessions for the album. Harrison played acoustic guitar and autoharp, while other contributions came from jazz musician Tom Scott, on flute and soprano saxophone, and percussionist Emil Richards. The second version of the song, titled "I Am Missing You (Reprise)", features an arrangement closer to a folk ballad, combining Indian instrumentation such as bansuri and tabla, played by Hariprasad Chaurasia and Alla Rakha, respectively, with acoustic guitars and violins. In Raga Mala, Shankar says of this version: "we attempted to convey the sounds and atmosphere of Vrindavan, the ancient holy place where Krishna grew up."

Further overdubbing on the material taped at A&M Studios took place at Harrison's FPSHOT recording facility in England later in 1973 and through to early 1974. Although Shankar Family & Friends had started as an Apple Records project, the winding down of the Beatles' record label resulted in Harrison forming Dark Horse Records in May 1974, to which Shankar and vocal duo Splinter were the two initial signings.

== Release and reception ==
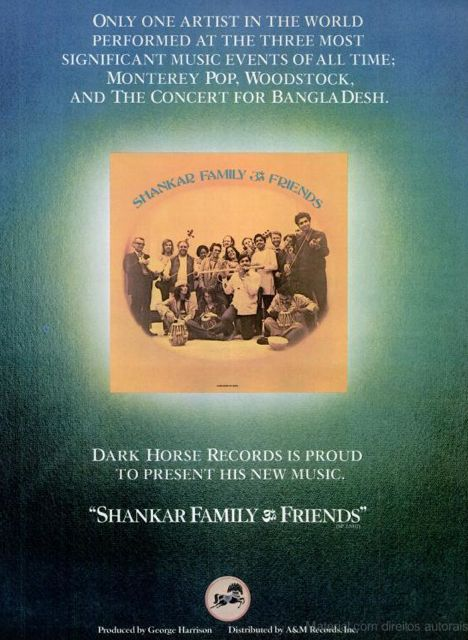
Advertisement for Shankar's first album on Dark Horse Records, October 1974

Backed with the instrumental "Lust", "I Am Missing You" was the first single released on Dark Horse Records. In the UK, it was issued as the lead single from Shankar Family & Friends, on 13 September 1974, but its US release was delayed until 6 November, a month after the album became available there. (Note: In America, the single's catalog number was DH 10001, signifying it as the first Dark Horse release. Its UK catalog number was AMS 7133, reflecting the numbering adopted by the label's worldwide distributor, A&M Records.) The song appeared as the opening track on the album, with the reprise version sequenced as track 4. In his interview with Horne, released to UK radio stations that September as The Dark Horse Radio Special, Harrison spoke of the single's commercial appeal: "[It's] really like Top of the Pops – it should be top of the pops, because it's lovely." Despite the song's simplicity and catchiness, it failed to chart in Britain or America.

Author Robert Rodriguez views "I Am Missing You" as "a pop/Indian delicacy" and recognises its potential for commercial success in a year when a rock version of "The Lord's Prayer" was an international hit for Sister Janet Mead. On release, Billboard magazine's reviewer listed the song first among the album's "best cuts" and wrote of the genre-crossing Shankar Family & Friends: "Above all, this set proves that Shankar is still a master of his craft and that not all music, pop or otherwise, need be of Western origins."

Noting its parent album's experimentation with jazz and funk styles, Simon Leng describes "I Am Missing You" as "[t]he most striking fusion on the album … a pop version of a Shankar bhajan" and praises the performance of "the sublime Lakshmi Shankar, whose voice soared through three octaves with ease".

The Harrison-arranged "I Am Missing You" was included on Shankar's career-spanning box set In Celebration, released in 1996. The reprise version appeared on a single-disc spin-off from this compilation, In Celebration – Highlights, providing what Billboard considered to be one of the "[h]ighlights among the highlights". In 2010, the song was made available again with the debut CD release of Shankar Family & Friends, issued as one of four discs in the Shankar–Harrison box set Collaborations.

In an otherwise favourable critique of Shankar Family & Friends, Sachyn Mital of PopMatters considers the pop version of "I Am Missing You" out of place there, saying: "This is one song I would avoid, [al]though its 'Reprise' smoothes over the outlandishness." Reviewing for The Second Disc, Joe Marchese opines: "The album gets off to a wonderful start with 'I Am Missing You,' as sung by Lakshmi Shankar. This rare English-language song shows off Shankar's gift for melody …"

== Performance ==
Shankar performed "I Am Missing You" throughout his and Harrison's North American tour in November–December 1974, although live versions are available only on the many bootlegs from the tour. The song was played as the finale to Shankar's set, midway through the show. As a forerunner to the 1980s world music genre, these live performances of "I Am Missing You" brought together Shankar's orchestra of distinguished Indian classical musicians – among them, Rakha, Chaurasia, Shivkumar Sharma, T.V. Gopalkrishnan, L. Subramaniam and Sultan Khan – and Harrison's entire band of top rock, jazz and funk players.

In February 2005, Shankar reinterpreted "I Am Missing You" in a jazz setting for a group project known as Jazzmin. Featuring six musicians from California and his daughter Anoushka on sitar, Jazzmin performed the song during a tour of India that year.

== Personnel ==
- Ravi Shankar – direction, backing vocals
- Lakshmi Shankar – vocals, backing vocals
- George Harrison – acoustic guitars, autoharp, musical arrangement
- Tom Scott – flutes, soprano saxophones
- Nicky Hopkins – piano
- Billy Preston – organ
- Klaus Voormann – bass
- Jim Keltner – drums
- Ringo Starr – drums
- Emil Richards – kartal, shakers
- Kamala Chakravarty – backing vocals
- Shivkumar Sharma – backing vocals

== Sources ==
- Keith Badman, The Beatles Diary Volume 2: After the Break-Up 1970–2001, Omnibus Press (London, 2001; ISBN 0-7119-8307-0).
- Harry Castleman & Walter J. Podrazik, All Together Now: The First Complete Beatles Discography 1961–1975, Ballantine Books (New York, NY, 1976; ISBN 0-345-25680-8).
- Alan Clayson, George Harrison, Sanctuary (London, 2003; ISBN 1-86074-489-3).
- Peter Doggett, You Never Give Me Your Money: The Beatles After the Breakup, It Books (New York, NY, 2011; ISBN 978-0-06-177418-8).
- Olivia Harrison, George Harrison: Living in the Material World, Abrams (New York, NY, 2011; ISBN 978-1-4197-0220-4).
- Peter Lavezzoli, The Dawn of Indian Music in the West, Continuum (New York, NY, 2006; ISBN 0-8264-2819-3).
- Simon Leng, While My Guitar Gently Weeps: The Music of George Harrison, Hal Leonard (Milwaukee, WI, 2006; ISBN 1-4234-0609-5).
- Chip Madinger & Mark Easter, Eight Arms to Hold You: The Solo Beatles Compendium, 44.1 Productions (Chesterfield, MO, 2000; ISBN 0-615-11724-4).
- Robert Rodriguez, Fab Four FAQ 2.0: The Beatles' Solo Years, 1970–1980, Backbeat Books (Milwaukee, WI, 2010; ISBN 978-1-4165-9093-4).
- Nicholas Schaffner, The Beatles Forever, McGraw-Hill (New York, NY, 1978; ISBN 0-07-055087-5).
- Ravi Shankar, My Music, My Life, Mandala Publishing (San Rafael, CA, 2007; ISBN 978-1-60109-005-8).
- Ravi Shankar, Raga Mala: The Autobiography of Ravi Shankar, Welcome Rain (New York, NY, 1999; ISBN 1-56649-104-5).
- Bruce Spizer, The Beatles Solo on Apple Records, 498 Productions (New Orleans, LA, 2005; ISBN 0-9662649-5-9).
- Gary Tillery, Working Class Mystic: A Spiritual Biography of George Harrison, Quest Books (Wheaton, IL, 2011; ISBN 978-0-8356-0900-5).
- Bob Woffinden, The Beatles Apart, Proteus (London, 1981; ISBN 0-906071-89-5).
- World Music: The Rough Guide (Volume 2: Latin and North America, Caribbean, India, Asia and Pacific), Rough Guides/Penguin (London, 2000; ISBN 1-85828-636-0).
