= Ravi Shankar: In Celebration =

Compilation album by Ravi Shankar
- Released: February 1996 (US); July 1996 (UK)
- Recorded: 1957–1995
- Genres: Indian classical music; jazz; world music
- Length: 4:39:24
- Labels: Angel, Dark Horse
- Producers: Richard Bock, George Harrison, Peter Baumann, Ravi Shankar, Christopher Bishop, John Mordler, Kurt Munkacsi, John Fraser, Alan Kozlowski, Shefali Nag, Frank Serafine, Sukanya Shankar
- Compilers: George Harrison, Alan Kozlowski

Ravi Shankar: In Celebration is a compilation box set by Indian classical musician and composer Ravi Shankar, released in 1996 on Angel Records in conjunction with Dark Horse Records. The four discs cover Shankar's international career, from the 1950s to the mid 1990s, and include recordings originally released on the World Pacific, His Master's Voice, Angel, Apple, Dark Horse and Private Music record labels. Shankar's friend George Harrison compiled and co-produced the set, which was issued as part of year-long celebrations for Shankar's 75th birthday.

Each disc of In Celebration adopts a musical theme covering a facet of Shankar's varied career – specifically, traditional ragas; orchestral works; collaborations with Western classical musicians; and vocal and experimental pieces, particularly in the jazz genre. Although Indian classical music receives relatively little coverage, the compilation includes examples of Shankar's work with artists such as Yehudi Menuhin, Bud Shank, Jean-Pierre Rampal, Philip Glass, André Previn, Harrison and the Music Festival from India. Among the previously unreleased selections, "Adarini" marks the recording debut of sitarist Anoushka Shankar, the youngest daughter of Ravi Shankar.

The box set has received critical acclaim for providing an effective retrospective of Shankar's musical career. It was followed by In Celebration – Highlights, an abbreviated, single-disc version of the full compilation, and led to further joint projects by Shankar and Harrison, including the 1997 studio album Chants of India.

== Background ==
In his book The Dawn of Indian Music in the West, Peter Lavezzoli describes the years 1989 to 1995 as "a period of several milestones in [Ravi] Shankar's life and career". The first of these was the 50th anniversary of Shankar's debut as a performer, a concert career that had begun with his and sarodya Ali Akbar Khan's duet at the 1939 Allahabad Music Conference. In 1995, Shankar turned 75, the year-long celebrations for which included a concert at New Delhi's Siri Fort, in February, and one at the Barbican Centre, London, in July.

Away from his life as a performer and composer, in September 1992 Shankar's longstanding heart problems led to him undergoing angioplasty, shortly after which his only son, Shubho, died. Shankar's friend George Harrison visited him following the angioplasty operation, and the two musicians began re-establishing a social and musical bond that had waned somewhat since the late 1970s, when Shankar cut himself off from many of his Western friends. (Note: In his 1997 autobiography, Raga Mala, Shankar writes that this partial estrangement from friends in the West had been due to his sensitivity to continued criticism from India that he was Westernising, and thereby diluting, Indian classical music.) After Shankar, Harrison and their families holidayed together over Christmas 1994, Harrison began compiling a career retrospective, Ravi Shankar: In Celebration, as part of Angel Records' celebrations for Shankar's 75th birthday year. Harrison co-produced the four-disc compilation with photographer and Shankar archivist Alan Kozlowski. The project partly coincided with Harrison's work on the Beatles' Anthology TV series and album releases, and led to him serving as editor on Raga Mala, Shankar's second autobiography, and the two of them collaborating on the Chants of India album (1997).

== Content ==
In Celebration divides Shankar's then 40-year international career into distinct themes, as reflected in the title for each of the four discs: "Classical Sitar", "Orchestral and Ensembles", "East–West Collaboration" and "Vocal and Experimental". The content includes items that were either previously unissued in the United States and Britain, or had been long unavailable by 1995. Angel executive Steve Murphy later credited the widespread goodwill felt towards Shankar as facilitating the retrieval of recordings from a variety of sources, following the decision in May that year to begin compiling In Celebration.

=== "Classical Sitar" ===
The idea behind this four-disc set is to show different aspects of Ravi's music. Most music lovers will have heard of Ravi Shankar, the Sitar and the classical Ragas and Talas of India, but how about Ravi the singer, the composer, the orchestrator, the innovator or the experimentalist?

— George Harrison, from his introduction to the album booklet

Disc one includes ragas first recorded for Richard Bock's World Pacific Records between 1957 and 1967. (Note: While World Pacific released most of his output over that period, Shankar's international recording debut took place in London in late 1956, for EMI. Before he first worked with Bock in Los Angeles, Shankar had also recorded for Columbia Records in New York.) On four of the disc's five selections, Shankar performs on sitar accompanied only by a tabla player – variously, Chatur Lal, Alla Rakha, Kanai Dutt or Kumar Bose. Among the featured ragas are Shankar's interpretations of Marwa, Bhatiyar and Charukesi, the latter a Carnatic raga, from the South Indian tradition, that he adapted for the Hindustani (or North Indian) discipline.

Based on Raga Khamaj, "Adarini" was a Shankar composition written for his then-teenage daughter Anoushka Shankar, who made her Western concert debut at the Barbican birthday recital in July 1995. "Adarini" marked Anoushka's debut as a recording artist; recorded in Encinitas, California on 2 September 1995, the piece features her on sitar and Zakir Hussain on tabla. (Note: The eldest son of Alla Rakha, Hussain appeared on another album release celebrating Shankar's 75th birthday, Concert for Peace (1995). Issued on Moment Records, this live album was recorded in November 1993 at a benefit concert for the Rajiv Gandhi Foundation, held at the Royal Albert Hall, London.)

=== "Orchestral and Ensembles" ===
Disc two begins with another previously unreleased track, "V 7½". Shankar based this piece on Raga Vachaspati and recorded it in 1968 with members of his first Festival from India revue, and American jazz flautist Bud Shank. Shankar's 1974 Music Festival from India, a venture sponsored by Harrison and recorded for his Dark Horse record label, is represented by "Jait".

The disc also includes "Sandhya Raga", a selection taken from Shankar's July 1988 concert at the Kremlin in Moscow, the live album from which appeared on German producer Peter Baumann's Private Music label. In the booklet accompanying In Celebration, Shankar describes "Ghanashyam" as a "ballet or music theatre" piece that reflects his sadness at how, particularly during the 1960s, Indian music "became synonymous with the use of drugs to alter one's state of mind".

=== "East–West Collaboration" ===
The third disc consists of collaborations with Western classical artists, including Yehudi Menuhin and Jean-Pierre Rampal, whose selections originally appeared on volumes two and three of the His Master's Voice-issued West Meets East series. The disc also offers pieces from Shankar's two sitar concertos – the first recorded in 1971 with André Previn and the London Symphony Orchestra, the second from 1982, with the London Philharmonic and Indian conductor Zubin Mehta.

The previously unreleased "Indo-Japan Finale" comes from a performance at the Japan American Centre in Los Angeles, held in June 1985 as part of the Rhythms of the World festival. It features Indian classical contributions from Lakshmi Shankar, Aashish Khan, Shubho Shankar, V.M. Bhatt and others, along with Japanese musicians such as Johnny Mori and Kazu Matsui.

=== "Vocal and Experimental" ===
Disc four contains vocal pieces, some sung by Shankar himself, and examples of his more experimental works. Among the latter are selections from Tana Mana (1987) and from Shankar's jazz-influenced collaboration with Bud Shank for World Pacific, Improvisations (1962) – a release that Rough Guides' world music guidebook describes as "[t]he original East–West concept album". Harrison and Shankar's 1970s projects on Dark Horse and the Beatles' Apple Records are also well represented, through the inclusion of tracks such as the pop bhajan "I Am Missing You", from Shankar Family & Friends (1974), and "Oh Bhagawan", from the Bangladesh relief EP Joi Bangla (1971). Previously unreleased, "Ta Na Nom" dates from 1974 sessions with the Music Festival from India personnel, held at Harrison's Friar Park home. Shankar says of this piece: "Based on the evening 'Raga Abhogi Kanada'. I used the 'nom tom' style of singing Alap in the traditional manner. It has the mood of a prayer."

The disc also includes examples of his 1989–90 collaboration with American minimalist composer Philip Glass ("Hey Nath", from Passages) and Shankar's work as a film soundtrack artist. The latter endeavour is represented by two pieces: "Sanwaréy, Sanwaréy", sung by Lata Mangeshkar and taken from Anuradha (1960); and "Pather Panchali", originally part of Shankar's acclaimed score for Satyajit Ray's 1955 film of the same name, but here re-recorded with Shank for Improvisations. The compilation's final track is another selection from the Inside the Kremlin live album, "Shanti Mantra". The recording represents an "expression of artistic unity" that Shankar recalls as highly emotional for the audience and performers alike, in what was then still Soviet Russia.

== Release ==
In America, Angel Records, in conjunction with Dark Horse, issued Ravi Shankar: In Celebration during February 1996. In a December 1995 article announcing the release, Billboard magazine noted the "fortuitous bit of timing" provided by the Beatles' Anthology series, and the resulting "reviv[ed] interest in the '60s", a decade when Shankar's audience had grown to include Western rock fans through his association with Harrison. Shankar's career-spanning project also closely followed his reuniting with Yehudi Menuhin for a television broadcast, From the Sitar to the Guitar, detailing the birth of the gypsy and flamenco traditions from their roots in Indian music. The UK release of In Celebration took place in July 1996. (Note: Although Rolling Stone and AllMusic give a first-release date of 5 December 1995 for the compilation, Lavezzoli and author Alan Clayson refer to it as a 1996 release. The February 1996 date is supported by Oliver Craske's chronology in Raga Mala, and by both the Billboard article previewing the release and author Keith Badman in his book The Beatles Diary Volume 2.) In the same Billboard article, Kozlowski stated his regret that it was not possible to represent Shankar's celebrated performance from the 1967 Monterey Pop Festival, while Shankar suggested that "We could have made 12 CDs, or 16, with all the material there was" but expressed particular pleasure at the inclusion of tracks such as "V 7½", "Adarini" and "Sanwaréy, Sanwaréy".

The packaging for the four discs featured a 64-page colour booklet with liner notes provided by music journalist Timothy White and recollections from Shankar on each of the compilation's 31 selections. The booklet credits Harihar Rao, a former student of Shankar's and a contributor to many of his musical projects from the 1960s onwards, as having provided "project research". In June 1996, Angel released the single-disc In Celebration – Highlights, which condensed the full compilation into what AllMusic's Thom Owens terms "the most essential items", totalling around an hour's worth of music.

== Reception ==
Professional ratings
Review scores
Source	Rating
AllMusic	5/5 stars
Billboard	"Spotlight"
Encyclopedia of Popular Music	4/5 stars
Entertainment Weekly	A

On release, Billboard's Paul Verna described the four-disc set as "[t]he perfect introduction to an indispensable artist". The magazine similarly considered the condensed Highlights to be "a fine single-disc compilation" and included the release among its "Critics Choices". In his review for Entertainment Weekly, Josef Woodard wrote of In Celebration: "a compelling historical sampler. In music ranging from classical Hindu profundity to East-West experiments to doses of cross-cultural kitsch, Shankar emerges sublime and game for new ideas."

Rough Guides' World Music deems In Celebration to be "a superb retrospective" and includes the compilation among its recommended Shankar recordings in lists for both "Hindustani classical discs" and the artist's "fusion outings". The same publication remarks on the omission of any of Shankar's "important early shellac recordings for His Master's Voice [India]", however, and of any "jugalbandi [pieces] with Ali Akbar Khan (a partnership that made them the hottest ticket in Hindustani music)".

Peter Lavezzoli describes the project as "a success" and writes that the "positive response" inspired Shankar to start work on Raga Mala. Harrison biographer Simon Leng refers to the "sheer, stunning virtuosity" of In Celebration, a "lavish" compilation that displays "Harrison's true love for the music" in addition to "showcas[ing] his musical guru in a bewildering range of settings and styles".

Bruce Eder of AllMusic praises the box set for "present[ing] a surprisingly rich and diverse overview of Shankar's career". Eder continues:

Each disc is different enough from what came before so that the listener is constantly surprised by new discoveries, and the last disc, with the addition of the voices, is the most delightful of all, spotlighting Shankar the composer and leader as well as Shankar the instrumentalist, and offering a rich, bracing body of music that stands apart from most listeners' associations with his work from the 1960s and early 1970s. From the opening 'Vandana' it draws us into a realm of music that is so sublimely beautiful that it makes everything that has come before it, in all its bejeweled splendor, seem almost plain and pale by comparison.

== Track listing ==
All selections written Ravi Shankar.

Disc one: "Classical Sitar"
No.	Title	Original release; producer and date of recording (if applicable)	Length
1.	"Charu Keshi"	India's Master Musician (1963); Richard Bock, 1957	13:27
2.	"Bhatiyar"	Unique Ravi Shankar (1991); Shefali Nag, 1988	18:38
3.	"Adarini"	previously unreleased; Ravi Shankar, September 1995	8:48
4.	"Marwa"	Ravi Shankar in New York (1967); Richard Bock, 1967	17:40
5.	"Dhun Kafi"	India's Master Musician/Recorded in London (1964); Richard Bock, 1963	12:31

Disc two: "Orchestral and Ensembles"
No.	Title	Original release; producer and date of recording (if applicable)	Length
1.	"V 7½"	previously unreleased; Richard Bock, 1968	18:09
2.	"Jait"	Ravi Shankar's Music Festival from India (1976); George Harrison, 1974	9:42
3.	"Sandhya Raga"	Inside the Kremlin (1989); Peter Baumann and Kurt Munkacsi, 1988	11:19
4.	"Ghanashyam"	The Musical Genius of Ravi Shankar (1992); Sukanya Shankar, 1991	5:06
5.	"Tilak Shyam"	New Offerings (1984); Ravi Shankar, 1983	23:21

Disc three: "East–West Collaboration"
No.	Title	Original release; producer and date of recording (if applicable)	Length
1.	"Sitar and Violin Duet"	West Meets East, Volume 2 (1968)	14:32
2.	"2nd Movement Sitar Concerto No. 1"	Concerto for Sitar & Orchestra (1971); Christopher Bishop, 1971	6:13
3.	"3rd Movement Sitar Concerto No. 1"	Concerto for Sitar & Orchestra (1971); Christopher Bishop, 1971	3:28
4.	"Morning Love"	West Meets East, Volume 3 (1977); John Mordler, 1976	12:05
5.	"Indo-Japan Finale"	previously unreleased; Alan Kozlowski, 1985	12:55
6.	"Enchanted Dawn"	West Meets East, Volume 3 (1977); John Mordler, 1976	11:45
7.	"4th Movement Raga Mala (Sitar Concerto No. 2)"	Raga-Mala (Sitar Concerto No. 2) (1982); John Fraser, 1982	12:45

Disc four: "Vocal and Experimental"
No.	Title	Original release; producer and date of recording (if applicable)	Length
1.	"Vandana"	Ravi Shankar's Music Festival from India (1976); George Harrison, 1974	2:37
2.	"Hey Nath"	Passages (1990); Ravi Shankar, 1989	6:07
3.	"Pather Panchali"	Improvisations (1962); Richard Bock, 1962	7:00
4.	"Supaney Mein Aye"	Shankar Family & Friends (1974); George Harrison, 1973	4:11
5.	"West Eats Meat"	Tana Mana (1987); Peter Baumann, 1986	6:08
6.	"Oh Bhagawan"	Joi Bangla EP (1971); George Harrison, 1971	3:35
7.	"Friar Park"	Tana Mana (1987); George Harrison, 1986	5:50
8.	"Tana Mana"	Tana Mana (1987); Frank Serafine, 1983	3:40
9.	"I Am Missing You"	Shankar Family & Friends (1974); George Harrison, 1973	3:40
10.	"Ta Na Nom"	previously unreleased; George Harrison, 1974	6:42
11.	"Fire Night"	Improvisations (1962); Richard Bock, 1962	4:30
12.	"Sanwaréy, Sanwaréy"	Anuradha soundtrack (1960)	3:12
13.	"Dispute & Violence"	Shankar Family & Friends (1974); George Harrison, 1973	2:29
14.	"Shanti Mantra"	Inside the Kremlin (1989); Peter Baumann and Kurt Munkacsi, 1988	6:49

== Sources ==
- Keith Badman, The Beatles Diary Volume 2: After the Break-Up 1970–2001, Omnibus Press (London, 2001; ISBN 0-7119-8307-0).
- Alan Clayson, George Harrison, Sanctuary (London, 2003; ISBN 1-86074-489-3).
- The Editors of Rolling Stone, Harrison, Rolling Stone Press/Simon & Schuster (New York, NY, 2002; ISBN 0-7432-3581-9).
- In Celebration, booklet accompanying Ravi Shankar: In Celebration box set (Angel/Dark Horse, 1995; produced by George Harrison & Alan Kozlowski; package design by Rick Ward/The Team Design Consultants).
- Colin Larkin, The Encyclopedia of Popular Music (5th edn), Omnibus Press (London, 2011; ISBN 978-0-85712-595-8).
- Peter Lavezzoli, The Dawn of Indian Music in the West, Continuum (New York, NY, 2006; ISBN 0-8264-2819-3).
- Simon Leng, While My Guitar Gently Weeps: The Music of George Harrison, Hal Leonard (Milwaukee, WI, 2006; ISBN 1-4234-0609-5).
- Ravi Shankar, Raga Mala: The Autobiography of Ravi Shankar, Welcome Rain (New York, NY, 1999; ISBN 1-56649-104-5).
- World Music: The Rough Guide (Volume 2: Latin and North America, Caribbean, India, Asia and Pacific), Rough Guides/Penguin (London, 2000; ISBN 1-85828-636-0).
