= Dawr =

Arabic music genre

A dawr (Arabic: دور or الدور; plural: adwar, أدوار; also spelled dour) is a genre of Arabic vocal music sung in regional or colloquial Arabic. The genre faded in popularity after the 1920s and often used the melismatic technique of ahaat.

The dawr often uses a string of maqamat, moving from one to the other in sequence.

Dawr can also refer to the first section of a muwashshah.

== See also ==
- Ragmala
