= Chants of India =

Studio album by Ravi Shankar
- Released: 6 May 1997
- Recorded: January–August 1996
- Studio: Sruthilaya Media Artists Studio, Madras; FPSHOT, Oxfordshire
- Genre: Indian classical, devotional music
- Length: 63:46
- Label: Angel
- Producer: George Harrison

Ravi Shankar chronology
Ravi Shankar: In Celebration (1996)	Chants of India (1997)

Chants of India is an album by Indian musician Ravi Shankar released in 1997 on Angel Records. Produced by his friend and sometime collaborator George Harrison, the album consists of Vedic and other Hindu sacred prayers set to music, marking a departure from Shankar's more familiar work in the field of Hindustani classical music. The lyrical themes of the recorded chants are peace and harmony among nature and all creatures. Sessions for the album took place in the Indian city of Madras and at Harrison's home in Henley-on-Thames, Oxfordshire, following his work on The Beatles' Anthology (1995). Anoushka Shankar, John Barham, Bikram Ghosh, Tarun Bhatacharaya and Ronu Majumdar are among the many musicians who contributed to the recording.

Chants of India was well received by reviewers; author Peter Lavezzoli describes it as "a quiet masterpiece" and "the most fully realized collaboration" by Shankar and Harrison. Shankar considered it to be among the best works of his 60-year career.

In 2010, the album was reissued as part of the Dark Horse Records box set Collaborations, which combined various projects undertaken by the two artists, beginning in 1973. Chants of India was the last formal collaboration between Shankar and Harrison, who was diagnosed with cancer shortly after its release. At the Concert for George in November 2002, Shankar incorporated some of the selections from Chants of India, including the album-closing "Sarve Shaam", in a set performed by daughter Anoushka as a tribute to Harrison.

== Background and content ==
Having maintained a close friendship in the decades since their last official collaboration in 1974, Ravi Shankar and George Harrison began working together in 1995 on projects to celebrate Shankar's 75th birthday. Harrison first produced a four-disc career retrospective issued on EMI's Angel Records, Ravi Shankar: In Celebration (1996), which also included unreleased recordings made by the pair, before serving as editor on Shankar's second autobiography, Raga Mala. When compiling In Celebration, Shankar and Harrison discussed with Angel Records the possibility of making an album of Vedic chants and other Hindu sacred texts set to music. According to Shankar, the record company were hoping to repeat the commercial success of a recording by "those Spanish monks" – Chant, an album of Gregorian chants by the Benodictine monks of the Abbey of Santo Domingo de Silos, featuring a contemporary rhythm section. Author Simon Leng describes the Chants of India project as a "back to the roots" exercise for Harrison, after his production of Radha Krishna Temple and his own releases such as "My Sweet Lord" and "It Is 'He' (Jai Sri Krishna)" in the 1970s. (Note: In the 1969–70 recordings credited to Radha Krishna Temple (London), the first UK branch of the International Society for Krishna Consciousness, Harrison had helped popularise the Hare Krishna (or maha) mantra and, in the case of "Govinda", what is reputed to be the world's first poem, taken from the Satya Yuga. "My Sweet Lord" also includes part of the maha mantra and a prayer in praise of one's guru, the Guru Stotram, while in his song "It Is 'He'", Harrison adapted the Sanskrit words of a kirtan that he, Shankar and others had sung in a temple at Vrindavan in February 1974.)

As far as the words are concerned, they are open now [after 40 years], but the tune I had to give, or add a slight orchestration in the background, was with this very thought that it should match this old sentimental, old spiritual context that it has. At the same time, not be too much, you know? Or sound very ritualistic or fundamentalist or anything like that.

— Ravi Shankar, 1997

Shankar had grown up in the Hindu holy city of Benares, where the public chanting of Vedic hymns "[awakened] his passion for music", author Reginald Massey writes, and as a young man during the 1940s he had embraced the concept of Nada Brahma (meaning "Sound is God"), under the strict tutelage of music guru Allauddin Khan. In his liner notes to Chants of India, Shankar nevertheless describes the undertaking as "one of the most difficult challenges in my life, as a composer and arranger". Shankar noted the precedents for such a venture: "Sanskrit chants from the Vedas, Upanishads and other scriptures have been recorded by many in India and elsewhere, either in its original form by the Traditional Scholars ... or sung within raga forms by eminent musicians with accompanying instruments. Some have even attempted to make them more popular by using a semi-classical and commercial approach. I wanted to make a version different from all these, but still maintain the tremendous spiritual force, and purity of the Suktas, Shlokas and Mantras, and at the same time make it universally appealing."

Shankar consulted a Dr Nandakumara of the Bharatiya Vidya Bhavan in London, regarding the interpretation of the Sanskrit texts. Aside from adapting these ancient texts, Shankar composed new selections for the album – "Prabhujee", "Mangalam", "Svara Mantra" and "Hari Om" – and, as he put it, "tuned them in the same spirit". Peter Lavezzoli, author of The Dawn of Indian Music in the West, writes of the album's themes: "The record begins with the traditional invocation to Lord Ganesha, continuing through a series of traditional Hindu prayers and chants from the Rigveda, Upanishads, and Bhagavad Gita." Harrison biographer Gary Tillery describes the songs' focus, following the opening invocations, as "peace, love, ecology, and social harmony".

Chants of India reunited Shankar and Harrison with English musician and arranger John Barham. Barham provided Western annotation of Shankar's melodies, a role he had first supplied for Shankar at the Bath Music Festival in 1966, when the Indian sitar virtuoso had duetted with Yehudi Menuhin. Anoushka Shankar conducted the musicians at the sessions, having made her European performance debut in July 1995 at an official concert to celebrate her father's 75th birthday, held at the Barbican Centre in London.

== Recording ==
The Chants of India recording was somewhat complicated by the fact that the record company wanted to release an album of "spiritual" music that would go to number one ... Neither George nor Ravi intended to commercialize it to anything like that extent ... the album is strictly a Ravi Shankar classical Indian record.

— John Barham, discussing Shankar and Harrison's vision for Chants of India, 2003

The first recording sessions were held in the south Indian city of Madras in January 1996, at Sruthilaya Media Artists Studio. After a second set of dates there, in April, Shankar and Harrison decided to move the project to Harrison's recording facility at Friar Park, his home in Henley-on-Thames, Oxfordshire. According to Tillery, Madras had been chosen in order to "cultivate authenticity", being a music capital of the South Asian region, yet the atmosphere at Sruthilaya "seemed too secular for the aura of spirituality they wanted to create". (Note: Author Keith Badman writes that Shankar and Harrison used a second location in the city during April – Swara Laya Studio.) A large cast of local musicians contributed to the recording in Madras, on instruments such as veena, violin, flute, cello, tanpura and mridangam, while the chorus singers (divided into "Indian" and "Western" groups on the sleeve credits) numbered 21.

While in India in April, Harrison visited the holy city of Vrindavan with his Radha Krishna Temple friends Mukunda Goswami and Shyamasundar Das. The pilgrimage inspired him in his current work with Shankar, author Joshua Greene writes, just as a 1974 visit to Vrindavan had been the catalyst for staging Shankar's Music Festival from India revue and their joint North American tour that year. In July 1996, Shankar and Harrison reconvened at Friar Park, after Harrison had recorded a contribution for Carl Perkins' Go Cat Go! album. The Friar Park sessions for Chants of India took place in the house's drawing room, with cables fed through from the studio area above – the same arrangement under which Harrison had produced the Music Festival from India studio album, in summer 1974.

I like producing Ravi's music, because for me it's educational as well as a joy to work with. It's actually soothing to your soul, and it helps you to focus or transcend.

— George Harrison, 1997

From 7 July, sessions ran intermittently through to late August. Shankar later told Rolling Stone magazine that he wrote "Mangalam" at this time: "'Mangalam' came to me while I was walking in Friar Park, George's place, where we were recording. I was looking at the trees and the sky, and feeling very elated all of a sudden, wishing everything should be good for everyone, and it just came to me."

Among the participating musicians at Friar Park were Shankar's occasional tabla player Bikram Ghosh, along with Tarun Bhatacharaya (santoor), Ronu Mazumdar (bansuri flute) and Jane Lister (harp). (Note: During the sessions, Harrison recorded Ghosh and Lister's contributions to the Indian segment of his song "Brainwashed", released posthumously on his 2002 album of the same name.) While operating mainly in the role of producer, Harrison responded to Shankar's requests to perform on the recordings; Harrison contributed on acoustic guitar, bass, autoharp, vibraphone and percussion, as well as supplying backing vocals. Shankar's wife Sukanya, a trained singer in the Karnatak tradition, was also among the vocalists during what the album sleeve lists as the "London sessions". The recording and remix engineer was John Etchells.

Tillery describes the making of Chants of India as a "labor of love" for Harrison following his participation in the Beatles' Anthology project, and Barham similarly recalls it as having been "a pleasure working on this beautiful record". In Shankar's recollection, following a playback of some of the tracks, Harrison was so moved that he "embraced me with tears in his eyes and simply said, 'Thank you, Ravi, for this music.'" According to Lavezzoli, the album was one of Shankar's "personal favorite works".

== Release ==
Angel Records issued Chants of India on 6 May 1997 in America, with a UK release following on 1 September. The album was marketed as a collaborative work, and Harrison joined Shankar in promoting the release.

These activities included television appearances in New York and Paris, one of which, for America's VH1 network, aired on 24 July as George & Ravi – Yin & Yang. In what would turn out to be Harrison's final performance on a TV show, he and Shankar discussed the album and their shared experiences, such as the Concert for Bangladesh (1971). Harrison then accepted an acoustic guitar from host John Fugelsang and performed songs including the just-released "Prabhujee", sung with Ravi and Sukanya Shankar.

== Reception ==
Professional ratings
Review scores
Source	Rating
AllMusic	4/5 stars
Billboard	"Spotlight"
The Encyclopedia of Popular Music	4/5 stars
Entertainment Weekly	A−
Uncut	4/5 stars

Chants of India was critically well-received, while commercially it peaked at number 3 on Billboard magazine's Top World Music Albums chart. On release, Josef Woodard of Entertainment Weekly labelled the album "enchanting" and added: "Unlike Shankar's classical raga recordings, Chants of India is a set of short, colorfully arranged pieces, enjoyable for neophytes and devotees alike. Another jewel from a humble world-music superstar." JazzTimes described it as "a surprisingly colorful and accessible set of 16 pieces". In his review for Billboard, Paul Verna commented that "the project possesses a hypnotic quality reminiscent of the label's enormously popular Gregorian chant recordings" and concluded: "'Chants of India' represents a creative milestone in the life of a veteran artist whose contributions to traditional Indian music cannot be overestimated."

Peter Lavezzoli writes of the album: "Chants of India is a quiet masterpiece, one of the most uplifting and musically engaging recordings of sacred music ... Harrison's production created the ideal setting for each chant, all of which are exquisitely sung, and the album remains the most fully realized collaboration between both artists." Jim Brenholts of AllMusic similarly praises the work, writing: "Shankar's style and diversity allow him to open doors that are closed to other musicians ... Shankar's compositional and sound-design styles add atmosphere. Harrison's deft touch allows the music to develop and maintain its own integrity. Among records of this nature, this one is special."

Author and former Mojo editor Mat Snow considers it to be "perhaps the very best introduction to the enduring creative friendship between the Bengali classical master and the scruff from Liverpool's back streets". Harrison biographer Alan Clayson describes Chants of India as a "thoroughly diverting production" that "[balances] sung lyrics as succinct as haiku and instrumental passages of a quirky complexity vaguely reminiscent of Frank Zappa". Writing in Goldmine magazine in 2010, Gillian Gaar described the album as "a sound that's akin to 'Within You, Without You'", and "especially soothing and relaxing" due to the devotional nature of the words. Anastasia Tsioulcas of NPR Music includes Chants of India in her list of Shankar's five "essential" works, and writes: "Shankar took Hindu prayers, mantras and scriptural texts and framed them within larger musical settings, incorporating both Indian and European instruments along with voices. The results are transporting – and very beautiful."

== Legacy and reissue ==
The personal and musical friendship between Ravi Shankar and George Harrison ... was powerful enough to make an impact on the large, musical life of the later nineteen sixties and it reverberates, as clearly, even today. I would go as far as to say that today there can scarcely be a musician or composer virtually anywhere in the world that is not aware of, nor been touched by, the fruits of the remarkable encounter between these two.

— Composer Philip Glass, 2010

Chants of India was the last formal musical collaboration between Shankar and Harrison. During promotion for the album in summer 1997, Harrison was diagnosed with cancer, a condition he was then thought to have beaten until a near-fatal stabbing by a deranged fan, on 30 December 1999, encouraged its return. On 29 November 2002, a year after his death at the age of 58, Shankar included selections from Chants of India in the opening, Indian music portion of the Concert for George, held at the Royal Albert Hall in London. Anoushka Shankar performed the set, as sitarist and conductor, backed by some of the musicians and singers who had contributed to the Friar Park sessions in 1996, including Sukanya Shankar, Chandrashekhar, M. Balachandar and Lister. The album-closing "Sarve Shaam" appears at the start of David Leland's Concert for George documentary film (2003), played as Harrison's widow Olivia lights commemorative candles on stage.

As part of Ravi Shankar's 90th birthday celebrations in 2010, Dark Horse Records reissued Chants of India in a four-disc box set titled Collaborations. A project overseen and produced by Olivia Harrison, the box set also included the albums Shankar Family & Friends (1974) and Ravi Shankar's Music Festival from India (1976), together with previously unreleased film of the Music Festival's debut performance in September 1974, directed by Stuart Cooper. (Note: In another release to mark the start of Shankar's tenth decade, East Meets West reissued the long-unavailable 1971 documentary on Shankar, Raga. As well as appearing in the film, Harrison produced its soundtrack album and provided finance through Apple Films.)

== Track listing ==
All songs are traditional, adapted by Ravi Shankar, except where noted.

1. "Vandanaa Trayee" – 4:33
2. "Omkaaraaya Namaha" – 1:53
3. "Vedic Chanting One" – 3:10
4. "Asato Maa" – 7:11
5. "Sahanaa Vavavtu" – 4:26
6. "Poornamadah" – 1:25
7. "Gaayatri" – 3:28
8. "Mahaa Mrityunjaya" – 4:42
9. "Veenaa-Murali" – 3:35
10. "Geetaa" – 2:13
11. "Mangalam" (Ravi Shankar, Dr Nandakumara) – 4:02
12. "Hari Om" (Shankar) – 2:57
13. "Svara Mantra" (Shankar) – 4:33
14. "Vedic Chanting Two" – 2:13
15. "Prabhujee" (Shankar) – 8:06
16. "Sarve Shaam" – 5:11

== Personnel ==
- Ravi Shankar – sitar, direction, arrangements
- George Harrison – vocals, acoustic guitar, autoharp, bass, vibraphone, marimba, glockenspiel
- Anoushka Shankar – conductor and assistant
- Ronu Mazumdar – flute

Madras sessions

- Kalyan – violin and assistant
- Subramaniam, Devi – veenas
- Murali – harmonium
- Seenu – mridangam
- Balasai, Kamalaskar – flutes
- Shekar, Biswas, John – cellos
- Mirali, Rex, Balu, Sasi, Girijan – violins
- Narayanan, Rebecca Goodsell, Sririam, Venkataraman, Gowri Shankar – tanpuras
- Babu Parameshwaran, Natesan, Ramchandran Suresh, Sashidran, Babu, Mani, Mani Kiran, Shanta Dhananjayan, Suhasini, Latha, Rashmi – vocals ("Indian chorus")
- Sarada, Martha, Vimala, Pearl, Adela, Dr Grub, Billy, Tony, Arul, Ranjith – vocals ("Western chorus")

London sessions

- Chandrashekhar – violin and assistant
- M. Balachandar – mridangam, morsing
- Bikram Ghosh – tabla
- Tarun Bhatacharaya – santoor
- Jane Lister – harp
- Antonia Paget – violin
- Michael Paget, Stella Page – violas
- Isabel Dunn – cello
- Terry Emery – tuned percussion
- Deepa Singh, Hari Sivanesan, Sivashakti Sivanesan, Gaurav Mazumdar, Shyamali Basu, Chandrashekhar, Sukanya Shankar – vocals

== See also ==
- Hindustani music

== Sources ==
- Dale C. Allison Jr., The Love There That's Sleeping: The Art and Spirituality of George Harrison, Continuum (New York, NY, 2006; ISBN 978-0-8264-1917-0).
- Keith Badman, The Beatles Diary Volume 2: After the Break-Up 1970–2001, Omnibus Press (London, 2001; ISBN 0-7119-8307-0).
- Alan Clayson, George Harrison, Sanctuary (London, 2003; ISBN 1-86074-489-3).
- Collaborations, book accompanying Ravi Shankar–George Harrison Collaborations box set (Dark Horse Records, 2010; produced by Olivia Harrison; package design by Drew Lorimer & Olivia Harrison).
- Concert for George DVD (Warner Vision, 2003; directed by David Leland; produced by Ray Cooper, Olivia Harrison, Jon Kamen & Brian Roylance).
- The Editors of Rolling Stone, Harrison, Rolling Stone Press/Simon & Schuster (New York, NY, 2002; ISBN 0-7432-3581-9).
- Joshua M. Greene, Here Comes the Sun: The Spiritual and Musical Journey of George Harrison, John Wiley & Sons (Hoboken, NJ, 2006; ISBN 978-0-470-12780-3).
- George Harrison, I Me Mine, Chronicle Books (San Francisco, CA, 2002; ISBN 0-8118-3793-9).
- Olivia Harrison, George Harrison: Living in the Material World, Abrams (New York, NY, 2011; ISBN 978-1-4197-0220-4).
- Elliot J. Huntley, Mystical One: George Harrison – After the Break-up of the Beatles, Guernica Editions (Toronto, ON, 2006; ISBN 1-55071-197-0).
- Colin Larkin, The Encyclopedia of Popular Music (5th edn), Omnibus Press (London, 2011; ISBN 978-0-85712-595-8).
- Peter Lavezzoli, The Dawn of Indian Music in the West, Continuum (New York, NY, 2006; ISBN 0-8264-2819-3).
- Simon Leng, While My Guitar Gently Weeps: The Music of George Harrison, Hal Leonard (Milwaukee, WI, 2006; ISBN 1-4234-0609-5).
- Chip Madinger & Mark Easter, Eight Arms to Hold You: The Solo Beatles Compendium, 44.1 Productions (Chesterfield, MO, 2000; ISBN 0-615-11724-4).
- Robert Rodriguez, Fab Four FAQ 2.0: The Beatles' Solo Years, 1970–1980, Backbeat Books (Milwaukee, WI, 2010; ISBN 978-1-4165-9093-4).
- Ravi Shankar, My Music, My Life, Mandala Publishing (San Rafael, CA, 2007; ISBN 978-1-60109-005-8).
- Ravi Shankar, Raga Mala: The Autobiography of Ravi Shankar, Welcome Rain (New York, NY, 1999; ISBN 1-56649-104-5).
- Mat Snow, The Beatles Solo: The Illustrated Chronicles of John, Paul, George, and Ringo After The Beatles (Volume 3: George), Race Point Publishing (New York, NY, 2013; ISBN 978-1-937994-26-6).
- Gary Tillery, Working Class Mystic: A Spiritual Biography of George Harrison, Quest Books (Wheaton, IL, 2011; ISBN 978-0-8356-0900-5).
