= Tana Mana =

Studio album by Ravi Shankar
- Released: June 1987
- Recorded: 1983–86
- Studios: Serafine FX, Los Angeles; FPSHOT, Oxfordshire; The Enterprise, Los Angeles
- Genres: Indian music, jazz, new age
- Length: 40:39
- Label: Private Music
- Producers: Ravi Shankar, Frank Serafine, Peter Baumann

Tana Mana is an album by Indian musician Ravi Shankar, originally credited to "the Ravi Shankar Project" and released in 1987. The album is an experimental work by Shankar, mixing traditional instrumentation with 1980s electronic music and sampling technology. Shankar recorded much of Tana Mana in 1983 with sound effects innovator Frank Serafine, but it remained unreleased until Peter Baumann, head of new age record label Private Music, became attached to the project. The album title translates to mean "body and mind".

In addition to his familiar instrument, the sitar, Shankar plays synthesizer extensively on the recording. The album also includes contributions from Lakshmi Shankar, Aashish Khan and Kumar Bose, and Western musicians such as George Harrison, Al Kooper and Ray Cooper.

== Background and recording ==
In his 1997 autobiography, Raga Mala, Ravi Shankar writes that he started work on Tana Mana in 1983 at the home studio of Frank Serafine, a sound effects designer for Hollywood films such as Tron (1982). The album began as an experiment by Shankar with the innovative sampling technology that Serafine had assembled at his studio – Serafine FX in Venice, western Los Angeles. Shankar recalls recording "two or three pieces" on synthesizer before having to depart for India. On his return to Los Angeles, he overdubbed contributions from regular accompanists such as his son Shubho and sister-in-law Lakshmi Shankar (on sitar and vocals, respectively), and from sarodya Aashish Khan and tabla player Swapan Chaudhuri. Up to five new pieces were also recorded at this time, according to Shankar.

In a 2011 interview with tablist Tanmoy Bose, who suggested that the album was "much ahead of its time", Shankar said: "Tana Mana was [me] like a child experimenting in a new sphere. That was a time of electronic keyboards, you could get different sounds, it was all very new." The experimental nature of the project impressed Shankar's circle of friends in California, he writes in Raga Mala, but confused record companies, who were unable to attribute the music to a recognised genre. The recordings were "left sitting there waiting for someone to show more interest", Shankar recalls, until the involvement of German composer Peter Baumann, who had formed a label specialising in experimental music, Private Music, in 1984. According to the credits listed in Shankar's 1996 box set In Celebration, further recording for what became Tana Mana took place during 1986.

One of the additional tracks was "Friar Park", featuring Shankar's friend and sometime collaborator George Harrison. Named after Harrison's estate in Oxfordshire, west of London, the song was based on Raga Charukeshi and features Shankar playing both standard and bass sitars (the latter known as the surbahar). Shankar and Harrison taped the track at FPSHOT, Harrison's home studio, accompanied by Ray Cooper on marimba and Markandeya Mishra, a local tabla player.

Using the scale of the Carnatic raga "Hemavati," I improvised [on sitar] ... I said some words in Bengali such as "adsola" (cockroach), "chitey gud" (jaggery – unrefined brown sugar), "Chittagong" (a city in Bangla Desh), and anything else that spontaneously came to mind. A fun recording.

— Shankar, discussing the creation of "West Eats Meat"

Another 1986 recording was "West Eats Meat", its title suggested by Serafine as a pun on Shankar's earlier cross-cultural projects, such as West Meets East, his trilogy of albums with classical violinist Yehudi Menuhin. Shankar describes the session for "West Eats Meat" as the first time he ever played sitar with a jazz bassist – in this instance, Patrick O'Hearn. Produced by Baumann at The Enterprise in Burbank, California, the session included contributions from Lakshmi, Khan and former Shankar student Harihar Rao (on percussion), and tabla player Kumar Bose. Like Chaudhuri, Bose had become one of Shankar's preferred accompanists on tabla, following the end of the sitarist's 33-year partnership with Alla Rakha in 1985.

Other Western musicians who contributed to the album include Al Kooper, on electric guitar, and Ric Parnell, playing electronic drums. In both his autobiography and the comments included with In Celebration, Shankar refers to Tana Mana as having been an enjoyable album to make. The title track was "one of my favourite numbers", he writes – a musical tribute to his mother, who died in 1936 while Shankar was in Paris with his brother Uday's dance company. In his 1995 comments on "Tana Mana", Shankar writes: "I lost my sweet mother at an early age, but I clearly remember her singing to me. I dedicate this song to her beautiful spirit." The title translates to mean "body and mind". Another track, "Memory of Uday", is dedicated to Uday Shankar, who died in Calcutta in 1977.

== Release ==
Baumann announced that Private Music had recently signed Shankar as a recording artist in October 1986, adding: "He'll be working a lot with synthesizers – it won't be your typically classical kind of Indian record." Private Music released Tana Mana in June 1987, with the album credited to "the Ravi Shankar Project". Shankar attributed its eventual release, four years after conception, to the advent of new-age music, a genre that Baumann's record label did much to promote. The photograph used on the album cover was taken by Chris Newbert in Hawaii; it was one of Shankar's favourite cover designs among all his releases. He describes it in Raga Mala as "a photograph of what looks like an exotic tree but is actually an underwater coral plant".

The association with Baumann led to two other Shankar releases on Private Music: Inside the Kremlin (1989) and Passages (1990), the latter a collaboration with American composer Philip Glass. "Tana Mana", "Friar Park" and "West Eats Meat" later appeared on In Celebration (1996), which Harrison compiled to celebrate Shankar's 75th birthday. The same three tracks, together with "Reunion", were included on the 2001 album Bridges, a compilation spanning Shankar's years on Private Music.

== Reception and legacy ==
Professional ratings
Review scores
Source	Rating
AllMusic	4/5 stars
The Encyclopedia of Popular Music	2/5 stars
Music Story	4/5 stars
Uncut	3/5 stars

AllMusic critic Adam Greenberg writes of Tana Mana: "The reverberant quality of the sitar combines rather well with the chosen electronic accompaniments to form a set of coherent songs, unlike many other such attempted combinations of traditional instruments and technology. The sitar playing is, as usual, superb ... With an extra sarod thrown in, a small front line of synthesizers, and Shankar's friend George Harrison assisting on the autoharp, the pile of musicality that forms allows an unexpectedly coherent, clear, and relatively focused piece of music to emerge."

Writing for the French website Music Story, Christian Larrède describes Tana Mana as "a very good record". While acknowledging the "risky" experimentation on Shankar's part, Larrède concludes that he "succeeds brilliantly here to spawn [traditional Indian music] with other musical cultures without alienating his knowledge, or selling his soul to the devil of commerce". Anastasia Tsioulcas of NPR Music includes "West Eats Meat" in her list of Shankar's five "essential" recordings, and admires it as a "playful track" with its title "a sly nod" to the Menuhin collaborations. John Lewis of Uncut highlights "Friar Park" as "a lovely piece of fusion" that includes tuned percussion in the style of Steve Reich and other "sensitive" accompaniment and production from Harrison as a complement to Shankar's sped-up sitar part.

In a 2010 article on Shankar, music website Shakenstir described Tana Mana as having "brought Mr. Shankar's music into the 'New age' with its unique method of combining traditional instruments with electronics". The article quoted a 2007 interview in which Shankar defended his association with Western artists such as Menuhin, Harrison, Glass and John Coltrane against criticism from Indian classical music purists: "Yes, I performed with Yehudi Menuhin, composed 2 concertos (in the process of writing my third) experimented with jazz, far eastern music, Philip Glass, ballet, orchestration film music, music theatre and so much more – from 1945 ... If you listen to my CD "Tana Mana", I have worked with electronic music 25 years ago. But I did all this without compromising on the solid foundation of our classical music ..."

== Track listing ==
All songs by Ravi Shankar.

Side one

1. "Chase" – 2:18
2. "Tana Mana" – 3:38
3. "Village Dance" – 4:04
4. "Seven and 10½" – 3:43
5. "Friar Park" – 5:54

Side two

6. "Romantic Voyage" – 3:27
7. "Memory of Uday" – 3:57
8. "West Eats Meat" – 6:08
9. "Reunion" – 4:15
10. "Supplication" – 3:15

== Personnel ==
- Ravi Shankar – vocals, synthesizer, sitar, surbahar, musical arrangements
- Frank Serafine – synthesizer, musical effects
- Lakshmi Shankar – vocals, backing vocals
- Shubho Shankar – sitar, backing vocals
- Ashish Khan – sarod
- George Harrison – autoharp, synthesizer, backing vocals
- Swapan Chaudhuri – tabla
- Kumar Bose – tabla, duggi
- Harihar Rao – percussion, gubgubbi
- Prodyot Sen – tamboura
- Ray Cooper – marimba
- Markandeya Mishra – tabla
- Patrick O'Hearn – bass
- Al Kooper – electric guitar
- Ric Parnell – electronic drums

== Sources ==
- Alan Clayson, George Harrison, Sanctuary (London, 2003; ISBN 1-86074-489-3).
- Bill Harry, The George Harrison Encyclopedia, Virgin Books (London, 2003; ISBN 978-0-7535-0822-0).
- Colin Larkin, The Encyclopedia of Popular Music (5th edn), Omnibus Press (London, 2011; ISBN 978-0-85712-595-8).
- Peter Lavezzoli, The Dawn of Indian Music in the West, Continuum (New York, NY, 2006; ISBN 0-8264-2819-3).
- Ravi Shankar, My Music, My Life, Mandala Publishing (San Rafael, CA, 2007; ISBN 978-1-60109-005-8).
- Ravi Shankar, Raga Mala: The Autobiography of Ravi Shankar, Welcome Rain (New York, NY, 1999; ISBN 1-56649-104-5).
- World Music: The Rough Guide (Volume 2: Latin and North America, Caribbean, India, Asia and Pacific), Rough Guides/Penguin (London, 2000; ISBN 1-85828-636-0).
