= Shankar Family & Friends =

Studio album by Ravi Shankar (on Dark Horse Records)
- Released: 20 September 1974
- Recorded: April 1973 – early 1974
- Studios: A&M, Hollywood; FPSHOT, Henley-on-Thames
- Genres: Indian music, jazz, pop, rock
- Length: 48:53
- Label: Dark Horse
- Producer: George Harrison

Ravi Shankar (on Dark Horse Records) chronology
Shankar Family & Friends (1974)	Ravi Shankar's Music Festival from India (1976)

Singles from Shankar Family & Friends
- 1. "I Am Missing You" Released: 13 September 1974 (UK); 6 November 1974 (US)

Shankar Family & Friends (stylised as Shankar Family Friends on the album cover) is an album by Indian musician Ravi Shankar, recorded primarily in Los Angeles during the spring of 1973, and released in late 1974. Produced by Shankar's friend George Harrison, it was one of the first releases on the ex-Beatle's Dark Horse label. The album was out of print for many years, and much sought after as a result, but it was remastered in 2010 and reissued as part of the Ravi Shankar–George Harrison box set Collaborations.

The title Shankar Family & Friends refers to the group-participation approach to the music, from Shankar's sister-in-law Lakshmi and son Shubho to a host of "friends" from the Indian subcontinent, Europe and the United States. In a deliberate blend of "East-meets-West" musical styles, other performers include Indian-music pioneers Alla Rakha, Ashish Khan, Shivkumar Sharma and Hariprasad Chaurasia, and Western musicians such as Tom Scott, Emil Richards, Billy Preston, Ringo Starr and Jim Keltner. The album features the Harrison-arranged pop bhajan "I Am Missing You" and a jazz-funk instrumental, "Dispute & Violence", the latter a part of an intended ballet, titled Dream, Nightmare & Dawn.

== Background and recording ==
Although Harrison had served as Ravi Shankar's producer before – on the latter's 1971 Bangladesh relief EP Joi Bangla; the soundtrack for the Apple documentary film Raga; and a more recent live album with Ali Akbar Khan, recorded in New York – this was the first occasion that the two had collaborated on a studio album. Harrison would later refer to these and other projects with Shankar as one of his "little careers going on on the side", a series of rewarding collaborations that co-existed beside his solo career. This time, although Shankar Family & Friends did begin life as an Apple Records project, the results would not be issued on the Beatles' label, but on Harrison's own Dark Horse Records.

The bulk of the recording took place in Los Angeles during April 1973, shortly after Harrison had completed work on his album Living in the Material World and that of Nicky Hopkins, recorded concurrently in London. Arriving in Los Angeles in March, Harrison first attended Sunset Sound Studios, where former bandmate Ringo Starr's sessions for Ringo were getting under way. (It was at this point that Starr, Harrison, John Lennon, Billy Preston and Klaus Voormann recorded Lennon's track "I'm the Greatest" together, an event that immediately sparked rumours of a possible permanent reunion involving at least three of the four Beatles.) Starr, Preston, Voormann and Hopkins would all contribute to Shankar Family & Friends over the next couple of months.

Sessions began at A&M Studios, Los Angeles, on 1 April and continued into May, with a break towards the end of the first month. In addition to Starr, Preston et al., as producer, Harrison invited Tom Scott (on saxophones and flute), Emil Richards (marimbas), Jim Keltner (drums) and David Bromberg (guitar) along to participate. A jazz arranger and composer, Scott had previously worked with Harihar Rao, a former student of Shankar's and now an ethnomusicologist at UCLA. These sessions marked the first time that Harrison and Scott worked together, so beginning a loose partnership that would endure through much of the 1970s.

For the Indian contingent, Shankar chose a cast of similarly illustrious names: Alla Rakha and Kamala Chakravarty, both of whom had supported him at the Concert for Bangladesh; Ashish Khan, Shivkumar Sharma and Hariprasad Chaurasia, on sarod, santoor and bamboo flute, respectively, who had all taken part in Harrison's 1968 sessions for the Wonderwall soundtrack album (and by extension, for the Beatles track "The Inner Light"); and Lakshmi Shankar, L. Subramaniam and Harihar Rao, all of whom likewise went on to feature in the Music Festival from India venture the following year. While the majority of the recording was completed during that spring at A&M, further sessions appear to have been required through to early 1974, at Harrison's Friar Park studio.

== Album content ==
Side one of the original LP begins with the Harrison-arranged, Spector-esque "I Am Missing You", a "toe-tapping" pop song about which Shankar would later recall: "I don't know how I did it, but one day I wrote an English song without thinking ... George heard it and liked it so much he wanted to do a version of his own." Released as a single, "I Am Missing You" features Lakshmi Shankar on vocals backed by a full Western rock band – Harrison, Hopkins, Scott, Voormann, Keltner, Preston and others – and a soaring, almost Ronette-like arrangement similar to those Harrison bestowed on his own "Don't Let Me Wait Too Long" and Starr's "Photograph" around this time.

The opening track is followed by four further Krishna bhajans, including a reprise of "I Am Missing You", and concluding with a gospel-inspired reading of the traditional folk song "Jaya Jagadish Haré". Side two (from the track "Overture" onwards) was written as a proposed ballet entitled Dream, Nightmare & Dawn, made up of what Harrison biographer Simon Leng describes as "adventurous ensemble compositions, improvised on the spot in two days". Shankar later conceded that such an approach was "a strange way of doing things", not to mention expensive. The ballet was never performed live in its entirety, however.

The result across the fourteen tracks is a blend of traditional Indian music, jazz, funk, rock and Western pop – in Shankar's words, "The album contains almost every possible style that you can think of." The best-known songs are the single and "Dispute & Violence", on which Emil Richards and Tom Scott star. Both these tracks were performed on the 1974 North American tour undertaken by Harrison and Shankar, when Harrison would introduce "I Am Missing You" as "a love song to Krishna". Footage of a live version of "Dispute & Violence" from the tour was included as a bonus feature on the DVD release of Martin Scorsese's 2011 documentary George Harrison: Living in the Material World.

== Release ==
Due to the delay in establishing a worldwide distributor for Dark Horse Records, Shankar Family & Friends was not issued for well over a year, until the autumn of 1974. It was numbered Dark Horse 22002, being the new label's second release, after Splinter's The Place I Love. Promotion for both albums included full-page advertisements in music publications such as Billboard, with Shankar's release carrying the tagline: "Only one artist in the world performed at the three most significant musical events of all time: Monterey Pop, Woodstock, and The Concert for Bangla Desh. Dark Horse Records is proud to present his new music." The album cover consists of a group photograph taken at A&M Studios that highlights the album's East-meets-West theme. Shankar sports a baritone saxophone, Harrison sits behind a small drum, while most of the other musicians have swapped their regular instrument for the opposite culture's near equivalent: Keltner plays another hand drum, whereas Rakha holds a pair of drumsticks; bass player Voormann has a tamboura, Sharma a Western-style violin, and Chaurasia a bass flute.

It's something else [from Shankar's usual work as a classical sitarist]. It's like, you know, Bach, Beethoven, Mozart or whatever – he's a composer and he's composing music, which nobody [else]'s doing.

— George Harrison, discussing the album on KLOL Radio, Houston, November 1974

Shankar Family & Friends peaked at number 176 on the Billboard 200 in America but failed to place on Britain's album chart, then just a top 50. According to pop-culture author Robert Rodriguez, Shankar was of two minds about the album's fusion of Indian music and Western styles, remaining "sensitive to charges that he was abandoning his classical roots for the rewards of superstardom". Harrison was proud of the result, and in 1979 named Shankar Family & Friends and its more traditional follow-up, Ravi Shankar's Music Festival from India, as two of the best releases on his record label.

== Reissue ==
In 1996, "I Am Missing You", "Supané Mé Āyé" and "Dispute & Violence" were included on Shankar's career-retrospective box set In Celebration, compiled by Harrison and Alan Kozlowski. With the album having been long out of print, Kozlowski viewed the inclusion of tracks from Shankar Family & Friends among the "prizes" offered by the compilation. The songs appear on disc four, about which Bruce Eder of AllMusic writes: "the last disc, with the addition of the voices, is the most delightful of all, spotlighting Shankar the composer and leader as well as Shankar the instrumentalist, and offering a rich, bracing body of music that stands apart from most listeners' associations with his work from the 1960s and early 1970s ... [Disc four] draws us into a realm of music that is so sublimely beautiful that it makes everything that has come before it, in all its bejeweled splendor, seem almost plain and pale by comparison."

Shankar Family & Friends was issued on CD in 2010 as part of Dark Horse's Collaborations box set by Shankar and Harrison. Reviewing the release for AllMusic, Richie Unterberger opines that "the more traditional pieces [come] off best" on Shankar Family & Friends, which he views as "the least artistically successful of the [four] discs", with "the blend sometimes sounding forced and, more surprisingly, occasionally sappy". Conversely, Terry Staunton of Record Collector considered it to be "arguably ... the most accessible" of the albums, on a box set that is "a strong testament to two friends' mutual respect and their desire to push musical boundaries". Staunton added of Shankar Family & Friends: "Classical Indian musicians rub shoulders with regular Harrison buddies, the clash of cultures resulting in a succession of intoxicating melodies."

Although he finds the pop version of "I Am Missing You" incompatible with the rest of the album, PopMatters' Sachyn Mital admires the ballet, writing: "'Overture' demonstrates the musical diversity the project encompasses ... 'Dispute & Violence' starts with vocal call and response interaction then transforms into an upbeat dance number. Everything ends optimistically though as the ballet progresses from an 'Awakening' to 'Peace & Hope', a slow building and collaborative, yet anticlimactic, finale." In her review for Goldmine magazine, Gillian Gaar notes the "crossover appeal" of the album and the "variety of musical colors" presented in the ballet, among which "the overture even has hints of Caribbean flavor". Writing in the book Worlds of Music, ethnomusicologist David Reck describes Shankar Family & Friends as "fascinating music".

Joe Marchese of The Second Disc praises Collaborations for the adventurous quality of its music, which he suggests is "Exhibit 'A'" in support of Harrison meriting the title "the Radical Beatle". Of the three studio albums in the box set, Marchese views Shankar Family & Friends as the "most commercial" and writes: "The album gets off to a wonderful start with 'I Am Missing You,' as sung by Lakshmi Shankar. This rare English-language song shows off Shankar's gift for melody ... [The ballet's] music is appropriately varied in tone and instrumentation over three movements entitled 'Dream,' 'Nightmare' and 'Dawn.' Western instruments such as saxophone, bass and guitar augment the traditional Indian sound to create unusual, evocative mood pieces with a definite, hypnotic groove." In 2023, it was reissued as a single disc the first time on standalone CD and as a limited edition orchid color vinyl by the revived Dark Horse label.

== Track listing ==
All songs by Ravi Shankar, except where noted.

Side one

1. "I Am Missing You" – 3:45
2. "Kahān Gayelavā Shyām Saloné" – 2:55
3. "Supané Mé Āyé Preetam Sainyā" – 4:15
4. "I Am Missing You (Reprise)" – 4:03
5. "Jaya Jagadish Haré" (PD) – 4:54

Side two

Dream, Nightmare & Dawn (Music for a Ballet)

6. "Overture" – 2:33
- Part One (Dream):
7. "Festivity & Joy" – 3:56
8. "Love-Dance Ecstasy" – 3:13
- Part Two (Nightmare):
9. "Lust (Rāga Chandrakauns)" – 3:13
10. "Dispute & Violence" – 2:43
11. "Disillusionment & Frustration" – 2:50
12. "Despair & Sorrow (Rāga Marwā)" – 3:04
- Part Three (Dawn):
13. "Awakening" – 3:05
14. "Peace & Hope (Rāga Bhatiyār)" – 4:31

== Personnel ==
- Ravi Shankar – direction, spoken voice, sitar, surbahar, Moog synthesizer, backing vocals
- Lakshmi Shankar – vocals, swarmandal, backing vocals
- Jitendra Abhisheki – vocals
- Tom Scott – saxophones, flute, handclaps
- George Harrison – electric and acoustic guitars, autoharp, arrangement on "I Am Missing You"
- Shivkumar Sharma – santoor, shaker, backing vocals
- Shubho Shankar – sitar
- Alla Rakha – tabla, pakavaj
- Emil Richards – marimba, percussion
- Hariprasad Chaurasia – bansuri, cowbell
- Ashish Khan – sarod, swarmandal, backing vocals
- L. Subramaniam – violin
- Palghat Raghu – mridangam
- Harihar Rao – spoken voice, dholak
- Kamala Chakravarty – backing vocals
- G.S. Sachdev – bansuri
- Sharad Kumar – bansuri
- Pranesh Khan – dholak
- Fakir Mohammad – tamboura
- Nodu Mullick – kartal, tamboura
- Krishna Temple – kartal
- George Ruckert – sarod
- Klaus Voormann – bass
- Nicky Hopkins – piano
- Jim Keltner – drums
- Billy Preston – organ
- Ringo Starr – drums
- Fred Teague – organ
- Ed Shaughnessy – drums
- Dennis Budimir – electric guitar
- David Bromberg – electric guitar
- Vini Poncia – tambourine
- Paul Beaver – Moog synthesizer
- Malcolm Cecil – Moog synthesizer
- Robert Margouleff – Moog synthesizer
- Ray Cramer – cello
- Al Casey (jazz guitarist) – mandolin
- W. Webb – esraj
- Ronald Cohen – sarangi
- Ray Pizzi – bassoon
- Bobby Bruce – violin
- Gordon Swift – violin
- Gene Cipriano – oboe

== See also ==
- Hindustani music

== Sources ==
- Keith Badman, The Beatles Diary Volume 2: After the Break-Up 1970–2001, Omnibus Press (London, 2001; ISBN 0-7119-8307-0).
- Harry Castleman & Walter J. Podrazik, All Together Now: The First Complete Beatles Discography 1961–1975, Ballantine Books (New York, NY, 1976; ISBN 0-345-25680-8).
- Alan Clayson, George Harrison, Sanctuary (London, 2003; ISBN 1-86074-489-3).
- Olivia Harrison, George Harrison: Living in the Material World, Abrams (New York, NY, 2011; ISBN 978-1-4197-0220-4).
- Peter Lavezzoli, The Dawn of Indian Music in the West, Continuum (New York, NY, 2006; ISBN 0-8264-2819-3).
- Simon Leng, While My Guitar Gently Weeps: The Music of George Harrison, Hal Leonard (Milwaukee, WI, 2006; ISBN 1-4234-0609-5).
- Ian MacDonald, Revolution in the Head: The Beatles' Records and the Sixties, Pimlico (London, 1998; ISBN 0-7126-6697-4).
- Chip Madinger & Mark Easter, Eight Arms to Hold You: The Solo Beatles Compendium, 44.1 Productions (Chesterfield, MO, 2000; ISBN 0-615-11724-4).
- Robert Rodriguez, Fab Four FAQ 2.0: The Beatles' Solo Years, 1970–1980, Backbeat Books (Milwaukee, WI, 2010; ISBN 978-1-4165-9093-4).
- Nicholas Schaffner, The Beatles Forever, McGraw-Hill (New York, NY, 1978; ISBN 0-07-055087-5).
- Jeff Todd Titon (ed)., Worlds of Music: An Introduction to the Music of the World's Peoples (5th edn), Schirmer Cengage Learning (Belmont, CA, 2008; ISBN 978-0-5345-9539-5).
