= Taan =

Vocal technique in Hindustani classical music

Taan (Hindi: तान, Urdu: تان) is a technique used in the vocal performance of a raga in Hindustani classical music. It involves the improvisation of very rapid melodic passages using vowels, often /ɑː/ (the long "a" as in the word "far"), and it targets at improvising and to expand weaving together the notes in a fast tempo. It is similar to the technique ahaat, used in Arabic music, or like an arpeggio in Western music.

The murki, a type of ornamentation, is a swift, short and taan-like movement that is heavily used in thumri.

Taans are clustered in different types:

- Bol Taan : Taan can be sung by utilizing the words of the bandish. This is a difficult type of a taan as in this correct pronunciation, meaning of the composition, everything has to be taken into consideration.
- Shuddha/Sapat (Straight) Taan : The notes are placed in an order in one or more octaves.
- Koot Taan : The notes do not remain in order. Therefore, the nature of Koot Taans is complicated.
- Mishra Taan : Combination of sapat and koot taans.
- Gamak Taan : Gamak is a technique by which a force is added to notes and each note is repeated at least twice.

Many other types of taan exist, e.g. Ladant taan, Zatkaa taan, Gitkari taan, Jabde ki taan, Sarok Taan, Halak Taan or Palat taan.

== See also ==
- Svara
