= Ragamala =

Ragamala or Raga mala ("garland of raga") can refer to:

- Rāgmala (Sikhism), composition of twelve verses in the Guru Granth Sahib
- Ragamala Dance Company, Minneapolis-based dance company that showcases the ancient Bharatanatyam dance form
- Ragamala paintings, series of illustrative paintings of ragas (modes in Indian music)
- Raga Mala (book), autobiography by Ravi Shankar, published in 1997
- Ragamalika, a Carnatic music form with different verses set in different ragas
- Raga Mala, sitar concerto by Ravi Shankar, first performed in 1981 and conducted by Zubin Mehta

== See also ==
- Raga (disambiguation)
- Mala (disambiguation)
