= Ahaat =

Technique used in Arabic vocal music

Ahaat (Arabic: آهات) is a technique used in Arabic vocal music, involving the use of extended melodic variations on the syllable "a." The technique, which gives the impression of a sigh, is typically used to express strong emotion such as longing, sorrow, or great joy.

Ahaat is used in Arabic classical and modern music as well as in light classical music, such as that performed by the Egyptian singer Umm Kulthum.

== See also ==
- Taan (music)
