= Frank Serafine =

American sound editor and sound designer (c.1953–2018)

- Born: April 6, 1953
- Died: September 12, 2018 (aged 65); Palmdale, California, U.S.
- Occupation(s): Composer, sound designer, sound editor
- Years active: 1975–2018

Frank Serafine (April 6, 1953 – September 12, 2018) was an American motion picture sound designer, sound editor, and composer. He is best known for his work as a sound editor and sound designer on films including the Star Trek and Tron series, The Addams Family, The Fog, Poltergeist II: The Other Side, Robot Jox, Ice Pirates, Hoodwinked 2, Orgazmo, The Lawnmower Man, Virtuosity, and Field of Dreams. He has received numerous awards, such as an Emmy Award for Sound Design on The Day After (1983) and an Academy Award for Best Sound for The Hunt for Red October (1990).

== Early career ==
After performing live with progressive rock guitarist Robben Ford and producing laser light shows at the Fiske Planetarium in Boulder, Colorado, Serafine was selected by Disneyland to compose and produce live grand opening summer shows at the Space Mountain Pavilion which brought him to Southern California. Shortly after, he created several records and toured live throughout Europe and the US with avant-garde jazz trumpeter Don Cherry.

Serafine produced music with his friend and music teacher Ravi Shankar, along with George Harrison on Tana Mana. He produced the remixed Peter Gabriel "Kiss that Frog” travelling Pepsi ride film with William Orbit, which won the MTV Award in 1993. In the same year Serafine worked on sound design live on stage with Gabriel's Secret World Concert Tour for the shows in California (Oakland, Los Angeles, and San Diego) and Phoenix, Arizona.

== Sound Designer ==
Beginning his film career in the 1970s, Serafine worked on engineering sound effects on Star Trek: The Motion Picture, Star Trek III: The Search for Spock, and both Tron films (Tron and Tron: Legacy).

Serafine made hundreds of commercials and TV episodes including Baywatch, VR.5, Thunder in Paradise, 13 years of Chrysler, CBS and FOX IDs, Energizer Bunny series, Nintendo, National Geographic ID, Mercedes, Maserati, California Lottery, Seaworld, and Disney's California Adventure Park.

He supervised the audio production, acoustic design and construction installations for several ride films and interactive themed attractions with Six Flags, Busch Gardens, The Henry Ford, Disney, Epcot Center, Iwerks, Universal, and Sony.

Serafine's game credits include TRON, Grand Theft Auto, Pocahontas, Wing Commander, Interstate '76, and The Suffering. Frank was commissioned to produce two CDs (Emotional Response and Ice Sculptures) for the European music library-licensing group Media Music. He was then commissioned by the biggest US Music Library Giant APM Music to compose two CDs titled “The Serafine Experience” that are heard on over 100 global broadcasts including the Clint Eastwood, Brad Pitt and Jane Fonda documentaries, as well as To Catch a Predator, MSNBC, Dateline, and Animal Planet.

He composed music and supervised the sound editing and design for Awake, a documentary on Paramahansa Yogananda, and then went on to produce, design, and construct the interactive museum exhibit installation for Disney/Marvel's Avengers S.T.A.T.I.O.N. featured at Discovery Times Square.

Serafine was a major part of several advanced hardware and software innovations in the film sound industry, including the first to implement Apple Computers and Avid/Digidesign Pro Tools on a major feature film.

== Sound Advice Tour ==
In April 2015, Serafine went on an educational tour to 33 cities through MZed called Sound Advice. On tour, he taught filmmakers about his award-winning secrets including sound recording, editing, effects, mixing, design, and inspiration. Product sponsors for the Frank Serafine MZed Sound Advice 33 City US and Canadian tour included: Rode, Izotope, Sony, Universal Studios, Sandisk, Shutterstock, Auro, Adobe, Figure 53, Zoom, DPA, ESI, Roland, Triad-Orbit, Anvil Cases, Wirecast, Samson, Mytek, Presonus, Angelbird, Zynaptic, TriCaster, Manfrotto, Countryman, Aja and many more. Introduction of workshop by Director Brett Leanord.

== Death ==
Serafine was struck by a car on September 12, 2018, in Palmdale, California, as he was crossing Palmdale Boulevard between 12th and 15th streets East. He died from his injuries at the scene. Deputies at the scene said the driver stopped at the scene.

== Accolades ==
Serafine won an Oscar in 1990 for his work on The Hunt for Red October. He won a Primetime Emmy Award in Outstanding Sound Editing for a Limited Series, Movie, or Special for his work on 1984's The Day After.
