= Joi Bangla =

EP by Ravi Shankar
- Released: 9 August 1971
- Recorded: mid July 1971; Record Plant West, Los Angeles
- Genre: Indian music, Hindustani classical
- Length: 13:45
- Language: Bengali
- Label: Apple
- Producer: George Harrison

Joi Bangla is an EP by Indian sitar virtuoso Ravi Shankar, issued in August 1971 on Apple Records. The recording was produced by George Harrison and its release marked the first in a series of occasional collaborations between the two musicians that lasted until the Chants of India album in 1997. Shankar recorded the EP in Los Angeles, to help raise international awareness of the plight faced by refugees of the Bangladesh Liberation War, in advance of his and Harrison's Concert for Bangladesh shows at Madison Square Garden, New York. Side one of the disc consists of two vocal compositions sung in Bengali, of which the title track was a message of unity to the newly independent nation, formerly known as East Pakistan. The third selection is a duet by Shankar and sarodya Ali Akbar Khan, supported by Alla Rakha on tabla, a performance that presaged their opening set at the Concert for Bangladesh.

Joi Bangla was the first of four Shankar-related releases on the Beatles' Apple label, closely followed by the Raga soundtrack album. The EP has been out of print since soon after its release. Of the three tracks, only "Oh Bhaugowan" has been reissued – on the Harrison-compiled Ravi Shankar: In Celebration box set (1996).

== Background ==
At this time of turmoil I was having, George was there [in Los Angeles] ... I told him what I was planning. You know, it's like a drop in the ocean. At the same time, I never wanted to take advantage of him. I did not want to say, "Would you help me?" But, somehow, it came very naturally. He was so sympathetic. "Well, let's do something."

— Ravi Shankar, 1997

A Bengali by birth, Ravi Shankar was deeply concerned by the plight of the cyclone- and war-ravaged people of East Pakistan during the first six months of 1971. To help raise funds to try to alleviate the misery, he turned to his friend George Harrison, then riding a wave of popularity with the success of his first post-Beatles solo album, All Things Must Pass.

Within six weeks, Madison Square Garden in New York was booked for two UNICEF shows on Sunday, 1 August; Western stars such as Eric Clapton, Bob Dylan, Ringo Starr and Leon Russell had pledged to be there; and Harrison's purpose-made single "Bangla Desh" was receiving airplay on US radio. Shankar later described it as a "miracle", the speed at which Harrison had made things happen.

According to Shankar, speaking in London later in August, Harrison wrote "Bangla Desh" within three hours of their conversation about the refugee crisis. Shankar said he then wrote "Joi Bangla" as an improvisation on Harrison's melody.

== Recording ==
With the Apple documentary film Raga in post production and awaiting release, the Beatles' record label would also be issuing a Shankar benefit disc, a three-track EP. For the sessions in mid July, most likely held at the Record Plant West like Harrison's, Shankar wrote a new composition, "Joi Bangla", which became the EP's title track. As with the Raga soundtrack album, Joi Bangla was produced by Harrison.

"Joy Bangla", the slogan and war cry of the Bangladesh independence movement, written in Bengali alphabet

Harrison's single had targeted listeners in the West with its call to "Relieve the people of Bangla Desh". Shankar instead addressed the victims themselves, as his "distant relatives" and his guru's family were among the tens of thousands pouring into neighbouring India. The lyrics are sung in Bengali, Shankar's first language. Apple's picture sleeve provided an English translation, in which Shankar calls on Bangladeshis to "be triumphant", and for unity "beyond conscience or creed". The song title translates as "Victory to Bangladesh" and was taken from "Joy Bangla", the slogan adopted by the Bangladesh Forces (Mukti Bahini) during the war. In India at this time, "Joi Bangla" was a form of greeting between people sympathetic to Bangladesh's struggle for independence.

The EP's other vocal performance was "O Bhaugowan". In this song, Shankar provided what author Peter Lavezzoli describes as "a prayer for help", asking: "O God, where have you gone / ... Sickness, cyclones, floods / Are upon us / Do you not care for us?"

The final selection, "Raga Mishra Jhinjhoti", was a sitar and sarod jugalbandi (duet) in dadra tal, featuring Shankar and Ali Akbar Khan, with Alla Rakha on tabla. According to a note on the picture sleeve, the piece was inspired by the folk melodies of Bengal.

== Release ==
Apple Records issued the Joi Bangla EP in America on 9 August (as Apple 1838) − eight days after the Concert for Bangladesh shows − and on 27 August in Britain (Apple 37). In an interview with Rolling Stone on 3 August, Shankar expressed relief that months of personal anguish over the crisis had come to an end, saying, "With George's single, 'Bangla Desh', my single, the film that has been made of the concert, the [live] album coming out and whatever the gate monies from this concert ... it will all add up to a substantial amount." He added that the funds raised would be minuscule relative to the size of the problem, but young people had been galvanised, and: "It is like trying to ignite – to pass on the responsibilities as much as possible to everyone else. I think this aim has been achieved."

The songs on side one of the record were credited to "Ravi Shankar & Chorus", while side two's duet was credited to Shankar, Khan and Rakha. Khan's name also appeared on the picture sleeve's front cover, given equal billing as Shankar, while Rakha's appeared on the reverse.

In The Spectator, Duncan Fallowell wrote of Shankar's gesture towards his homeland:

Ravi Shankar decided to make public his concern for the events in Bengal in the only way which now makes sense, by supporting the Free Bengal movement against the horrifying brutality of their military overlords from West Pakistan ... With the same destination in view, Apple have released George Harrison's record, Bangla Desh, and one also from Mr Shankar, Joi Bangla, at 49 pence each, both worth it. The first is George at his most sinuous and plaintive ... the second has the kind of high spirits encountered in musicals shown at the Godeon [Cinema], Southall (these musicals by the way, produced in prodigious quantities, are – let me warn you – tragically addictive).

Record World recognised Shankar as Bengal's "foremost musician" whose new release coincided with "the eyes of the world focused on the tragedy of Bangla Desh". Cash Box described "Joi Bangla" as "Intriguing raga sparkling with the George Harrison production touch". The reviewer said that the chorus singing added a degree of commercial appeal and the song was sure to gain extensive play on FM and underground radio. In January 1972, Billboard listed "Joi Bangla" and "Oh Bhaugowan" together at number 4 in a chart compiled by Poland's Music Clubs' Co-Ordination Council.

== Legacy ==
Shankar and Harrison's efforts to raise awareness of the refugees' plight ensured that the crisis became a central issue in the West. In mid August 1971, Shankar told Melody Maker that Indian music was now more popular than ever before in the West, adding that he, Rakha and their accompanists might perform some of the songs at his upcoming concert at the Royal Albert Hall in London. Following the example set by Shankar and Harrison's topical records, Allen Ginsberg wrote the poem "September on Jessore Road", after visiting the area, and Joan Baez wrote "Song for Bangladesh", released in 1972.

Joi Bangla was the only extended-play release by an Apple Records artist (discounting promotional EPs, where two or more acts from the Apple roster were combined). Among latter-day reviewers, author Alan Clayson considers the title track "more melodiously uplifting than any other of George [Harrison]'s Indo-pop productions". Writing on the occasion of the Concert for Bangladesh film's DVD release in 2005, Francis C. Assisi, a reviewer for The Canadian India Times in the early 1970s, recalled the juxtaposition of reading about the "holocaust" caused by the Bangladesh Liberation War and the regional cyclone, and seeing his two-year-old son "joyfully revelling in the recently released Ravi Shankar–Ali Akbar Khan duet 'Joi Bangla'". In his book on Harrison's musical career, Simon Leng describes "Raga Mishra Jhinjhoti" as "stirring ... [a] masterful performance" and similarly highlights "Oh Bhaugowan" for its "impassioned and moving appeal for divine assistance".

The songs on Joi Bangla received little in the way of repackaging after their original 1971 release. "Oh Bhaugowan" was included on the In Celebration box set (1996), appearing on disc four, which contains, in the words of AllMusic critic Bruce Eder, "the lion's share of the 1970s vintage material recorded under the auspices of Harrison, as well as capturing Shankar working in a vocal music mode (including his own vocals, which are astonishingly beautiful and affecting)".

== Track listing ==
All selections written by Ravi Shankar, except where noted.

Side one

Credited to Ravi Shankar & Chorus

1. "Joi Bangla" – 3:18
2. "Oh Bhaugowan" – 3:35

Side two

Credited to Ravi Shankar and Ali Akbar Khan with Alla Rakha

1. "Raga Mishra Jhinjhoti" (PD) – 6:52

== Personnel ==
- Ravi Shankar – vocals, sitar, direction
- Ali Akbar Khan – sarod
- Alla Rakha – tabla
- G.S. Sachdev – bansuri
- Sanjukta Ghosh – vocals
- Shubho Shankar – vocals, sitar
- Harihar Rao – ektara
- George Harrison – unspecified
- unnamed "Chorus" singers and musicians – harmonium, percussion

== Sources ==
- Keith Badman, The Beatles Diary Volume 2: After the Break-Up 1970–2001, Omnibus Press (London, 2001; ISBN 0-7119-8307-0).
- Harry Castleman & Walter J. Podrazik, All Together Now: The First Complete Beatles Discography 1961–1975, Ballantine Books (New York, NY, 1976; ISBN 0-345-25680-8).
- Alan Clayson, George Harrison, Sanctuary (London, 2003; ISBN 1-86074-489-3).
- The Editors of Rolling Stone, Harrison, Rolling Stone Press/Simon & Schuster (New York, NY, 2002; ISBN 0-7432-3581-9).
- George Harrison, I Me Mine, Chronicle Books (San Francisco, CA, 2002; ISBN 0-8118-3793-9).
- Olivia Harrison, George Harrison: Living in the Material World, Abrams (New York, NY, 2011; ISBN 978-1-4197-0220-4).
- Peter Lavezzoli, The Dawn of Indian Music in the West, Continuum (New York, NY, 2006; ISBN 0-8264-2819-3).
- Simon Leng, While My Guitar Gently Weeps: The Music of George Harrison, Hal Leonard (Milwaukee, WI, 2006; ISBN 1-4234-0609-5).
- Chip Madinger & Mark Easter, Eight Arms to Hold You: The Solo Beatles Compendium, 44.1 Productions (Chesterfield, MO, 2000; ISBN 0-615-11724-4).
- Srinath Raghavan, 1971: A Global History of the Creation of Bangladesh, Harvard University Press (Cambridge, MA, 2013; ISBN 978-0-674-72864-6).
- Robert Rodriguez, Fab Four FAQ 2.0: The Beatles' Solo Years, 1970–1980, Backbeat Books (Milwaukee, WI, 2010; ISBN 978-1-4165-9093-4).
- Nicholas Schaffner, The Beatles Forever, McGraw-Hill (New York, NY, 1978; ISBN 0-07-055087-5).
- Ravi Shankar, My Music, My Life, Mandala Publishing (San Rafael, CA, 2007; ISBN 978-1-60109-005-8).
- Bruce Spizer, The Beatles Solo on Apple Records, 498 Productions (New Orleans, LA, 2005; ISBN 0-9662649-5-9).
- Gary Tillery, Working Class Mystic: A Spiritual Biography of George Harrison, Quest Books (Wheaton, IL, 2011; ISBN 978-0-8356-0900-5).
- World Music: The Rough Guide (Volume 2: Latin and North America, Caribbean, India, Asia and Pacific), Rough Guides/Penguin (London, 2000; ISBN 1-85828-636-0).
