= Dark Horse Records =

British record label

- Dark Horse Records' original logo
- Founded: May 1974
- Founder: George Harrison
- Distributors: A&M Records (1974–76); Warner Bros. Records (1976–94); EMI (2002–04); Rhino (2010); Universal Music Group (2017–2020); BMG Rights Management (2020–present)
- Genre: Rock, Indian classical, soul
- Country of origin: United Kingdom
- Official website: darkhorserecords.com

Dark Horse Records is an independent record label founded by former Beatle George Harrison in 1974. In 2020, Harrison’s son Dhani Harrison and David Zonshine reactivated the label, making available its back catalog and becoming the new home of Yusuf Cat Stevens, Steve Perry, Billy Idol, Joe Strummer, and other artists.

For a company name, Harrison used the title of a song he had written in 1973, "Dark Horse." The inspiration for the Dark Horse Records logo came from a label on a tin that Harrison found during a trip to India. The logo centers the seven-headed horse Uchchaisravas, a figure in Indian art and mythology.

== History ==
=== 1968-1973 ===
The formation of The Beatles' EMI-affiliated Apple Records in 1968 allowed Harrison to work closely with up-and-coming artists he signed to the label, including Jackie Lomax, Billy Preston and Ali Akbar Khan. Following the Beatles' break-up in 1970, Harrison continued to produce music as well as maintain his solo career, adding establish artists such as Ravi Shankar and Ronnie Spector to Apple's roster.

By 1973, Apple Records was winding down as John Lennon and Ringo Starr severed their ties with Beatles manager Allen Klein. The former Beatles were contractually obliged to EMI until 26 January 1976, as solo artists. Harrison sought a new avenue for his extracurricular projects. He was producing an "East-meets-West" album by Shankar and the debut by a duo from South Shields, Splinter. Harrison and Starr considered buying Apple in 1973 and running it themselves, but Harrison was wary of business complications associated with the label.

In late 1973, Harrison began recording his fifth studio album, Dark Horse.

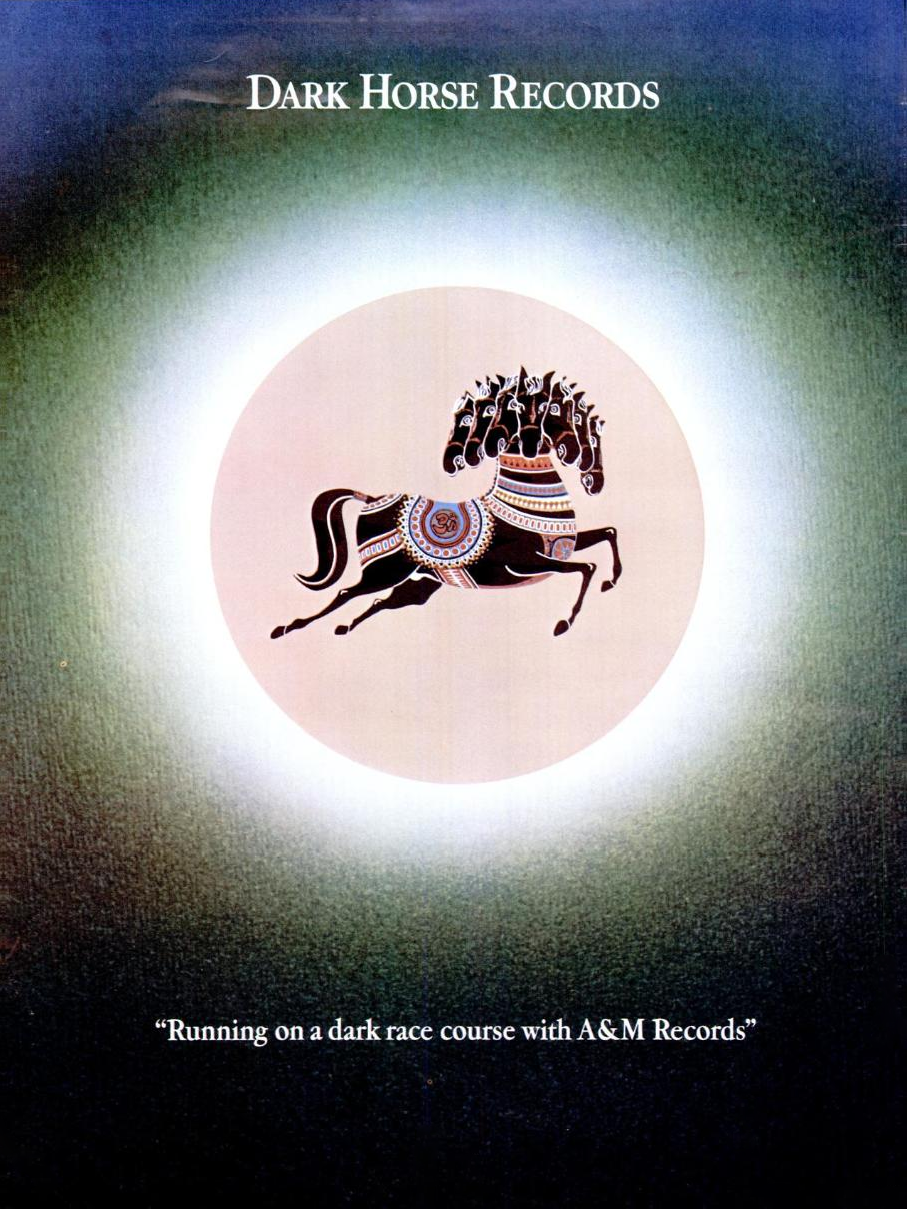
First trade ad for Dark Horse Records, August 1974

=== 1974-2001 ===
It went crazy in the end, Apple, but it did give some good people an outlet. That’s why I’m here now with Dark Horse Records – Apple didn’t shake my faith that much. Good musicians are worth encouraging.

— George Harrison to Melody Maker, 1975

In early 1974, he began a dialogue with David Geffen, head of Asylum Records in Los Angeles, about setting up his own independent label. Harrison also consulted Leon Russell, co-founder of Shelter Records. Harrison eventually partnered with A&M Records, the label owned and operated by Herb Alpert and Jerry Moss, for worldwide distribution.

Later that year, George Harrison launched Dark Horse Records, based in Los Angeles. The first singles Dark Horse Records released were Ravi Shankar’s "I Am Missing You" which was produced and arranged by Harrison and Splinter’s "Costafine Town," which went top 10 in Australia and South Africa and made the UK top twenty. Splinter’s album The Place I Love was produced by Harrison.

Attitudes, Stairsteps and Keni Burke were among the other artists who recorded for Dark Horse. While Harrison owned the label, as a solo artist, he wasn't able to be signed to Dark Horse Records until January 27, 1976. All of his subsequent recordings were released through the label, starting with that year's Thirty Three & 1/3 and ending with Live in Japan in 1992.

=== 2002-2018 ===
After a ten-year period of inactivity, the label returned in 2002 with the posthumous release of Harrison's final studio album, Brainwashed, was produced by Harrison, his son Dhani Harrison and Jeff Lynne. It featured musicians such as drummers Jim Keltner and Ray Cooper; pianists Jools Holland and John Lord; keyboardists Mike Moran and Marc Mann; harpist Jane Lister; guitarist Joe Brown; and bassist and tuba player Herbie Flowers.

Harrison's back catalog on the label was remastered and reissued as the Dark Horse Years 1976–1992 box set in 2004.

Dark Horse Records issued the Shankar–Harrison compilation box set Collaborations in 2010, distributed by Rhino Entertainment.

=== 2019-present ===
Dark Horse Records was revived in 2020 under the guidance of Dhani Harrison and David Zonshine. They subsequently signed a distribution deal with BMG Rights Management. Its inaugural releases included an Attitudes compilation, reissues of Shankar’s In Concert 1972, Shankar’s 1997 Chants of India and the single "For Real–For Tom," honoring the late Tom Petty, featuring Harrison, Jakob Dylan, Amos Lee, Lukas Nelson, Micah Nelson and Willie Nelson. Dark Horse re-released out of print albums from the label’s 1974-1977 back catalog, its Indian label imprint, HariSongs, and Leon Russell's catalog. Since its relaunch, Dark Horse Records has released work from Yusuf / Cat Stevens, Billy Idol, Steve Perry, Benmont Tench (Tom Petty & the Heartbreakers), Huun-Huur-Tu, Nina Simone, Jon Lord (Deep Purple/Whitesnake) Robin Nolan, the 101ers and Traveling Wilburys.

In March 2021, the record label released Assembly, a new remastered collection of Joe Strummer's solo work. Part of the publishing deal for Strummer’s catalog included the three Mescaleros albums, his scores, hundreds of his songs, and the final Clash album, Cut The Crap.

In February 2023, Harrison’s twelve solo albums and publishing became part of Dark Horse Records, in partnership with BMG. Harrison’s solo studio albums were released in Dolby Atmos on Apple Music.

Dark Horse released the Steve Perry & Willie Nelson duet of the Journey song "Faithfully," with profits going to Farm Aid in May 2025. The label’s release of Billy’s Idol’s 2025 album, Dream Into It made the Top 10 on the Billboard Album Sales Chart, a first for Idol. It was one of the highest charting non-George Harrison releases in Dark Horse Records’ history, reaching #2 on the Germany Top 100. Also that year, Finn Wolfhard directed the music video of Harrison’s 1973 hit "Give Me Love (Give Me Peace on Earth)."

In 2025, Dark Horse Records released two of Billy Preston’s remastered albums that George Harrison produced, That’s The Way God Planned It and co-produced Encouraging Words. Sometimes referred to as the fifth Beatle, Preston died in 2006.

The George Harrison-produced The Radha Krsna Temple album was reissued in 2025. Originally released in 1971, it had been out of print since 2010. It features the singles "Hare Krishna Mantra," and "Govinda."

Traveling Wilburys, which consisted of George Harrison, Bob Dylan, Roy Orbison, Jeff Lynne, Tom Petty, and Jim Keltner won the 32nd Grammy Award in the Best Rock Performance By a Duo or Group With Vocal Award for its album Traveling Wilburys Vol. 1 in 1990. The band followed the record up with Traveling Wilburys Vol. 3. Both records were released digitally in 2026.

== Distribution ==
The label was distributed internationally by A&M Records for the first two years of its operation. Following a highly publicized split with A&M, Harrison and Dark Horse formed a long-term partnership with Warner Bros. Records that lasted until the expiration of his contract in 1994.

Dark Horse was distributed by A&M Records (1974–76), Warner Bros. Records (1976–94) and EMI (2002–04).

In 2017 all original Apple and Dark Horse Records albums were reissued and distributed by Universal Music Group.

On 22 January 2020, Dark Horse signed a distribution deal with BMG Rights Management.

== Artists ==
Dark Horse Records continues to release George Harrison's catalog, in addition to the following roster of artists:

- George Harrison
- Yusuf/Cat Stevens
- Steve Perry
- The Traveling Wilburys
- Nina Simone
- Ravi Shankar
- Billy Preston
- Joe Strummer
- Billy Idol
- Benmont Tench
- Jon Lord
- The Radha Krsna Temple
- Huun-Huur-Tu
- Ivan Shopov, Carmen Rizzo, Dhani Harrison featuring New Bulgarian Voices and Georgi Petkov
- Robin Nolan
- The 101ers
- Attitudes
- R. Carlos Nakai
- Splinter, a South Shields duo
- The Stairsteps
- R&B vocalist Keni Burke, a former member of the Stairsteps
- Henry McCullough, formerly guitarist with Joe Cocker and Wings
- Jiva, a California band

== Discography ==
Singles

Catalogue Number		Artist	Title	Release Date	
(United Kingdom) UK	(United States) US	Artist	Title	(United Kingdom) UK	(United States) US
AMS 7133	DH-10001	Ravi Shankar	"I Am Missing You" / "Lust"	13.09.74	06.11.74
AMS 7135	DH-10002	Splinter	"Costafine Town" / "Elly May"	13.09.74	07.11.74
AMS 5501	–	Splinter	"Drink All Day" / "Haven't Got Time"	07.02.75	–
AMS 5502	–	Splinter	"China Light" / "Drink All Day"	21.02.75	–
–	DH-10003	Splinter	"China Light" / "Haven't Got Time"	–	07.03.75
AMS 5503	–	Splinter	"Which Way Will I Get Home" / "Green Line Bus"	07.11.75	–
AMS 5505	DH-10005	Stairsteps	"From Us to You" / "Time"	30.01.76	03.12.75
AMS 5504	DH-10004	Attitudes	"Ain't Love Enough" / "The Whole World's Gone Crazy"	13.02.76	09.12.75
–	DH-10007	Splinter	"Which Way Will I Get Home" / "What Is It (If You Never Ever Tried It Yourself)"	–	09.02.76
–	DH-10006	Jiva	"Something's Goin' on Inside LA" / "Take My Love"	–	11.02.76
AMS 5506	–	Splinter	"Half Way There" / "What Is It (If You Never Ever Tried It Yourself)"	21.05.76	–
AMS 5507	–	Stairsteps	"Pasado" / "Throwin' Stones Atcha"	21.05.76	–
–	DH-10008	Attitudes	"Honey Don't Leave L.A." / "Lend a Hand"	–	31.05.76
–	DH-10009	Stairsteps	"Tell Me Why" / "Salaam"	–	14.06.76
–	DH-10010	Splinter	"After Five Years" / "Half Way There"	–	16.07.76
AMS 5508	DH-10011	Attitudes	"Sweet Summer Music" / "If We Want To"	20.08.76	23.07.76
K 16856	DRC 8294	George Harrison	"This Song" / "Learning How to Love You"	19.11.76	03.11.76
–	DRC 8313	George Harrison	"Crackerbox Palace" / "Learning How to Love You"	–	24.01.77
K 16896	–	George Harrison	"True Love" / "Pure Smokey"	11.02.77	–
K 16967	–	George Harrison	"It's What You Value" / "Woman Don't You Cry for Me"	31.05.77	–
–	DRC 8404	Attitudes	"Sweet Summer Music" / "Being Here with You"	–	13.06.77
K 17009	DRC 8439	Splinter	"Round and Round" / "Being Here with You"	06.09.77	
–	DRC 8474	Keni Burke	"Shuffle" / "From Me to You"	–	11.10.77
–	DRC 8522	Keni Burke	"Day" / "Keep on Singing"	–	.01.78
K 17116	–	Splinter	"New York City (Who Am I)" / "Baby Love"	.02.78	–
–	DRC 8523	Splinter	"Motions of Love" / "I Need Your Love"	–	.02.78
–	DRC 8763	George Harrison	"Blow Away" / "Soft-Hearted Hana"	–	04.02.79
K 17327	–	George Harrison	"Blow Away" / "Soft Touch"	14.02.79	–
K 17284	–	George Harrison	"Love Comes to Everyone" / "Soft-Hearted Hana"	20.04.79	–
–	DRC 8763	George Harrison	"Love Comes to Everyone" / "Soft Touch"	–	11.05.79
K 17423^{[1]}	–	George Harrison	"Faster" / "Your Love Is Forever"	30.07.79	–
K 17807	DRC49725	George Harrison	"All Those Years Ago" / "Writing's on the Wall"	11.05.81	06.05.81
K 17837	DRC49785	George Harrison	"Teardrops" / "Save the World"	31.07.81	15.07.81
929864-7	7-29864	George Harrison	"Wake Up My Love" / "Greece"	08.11.82	27.10.82
–	7-29744	George Harrison	"I Really Love You" / "Circles"	–	07.02.83
W8178	7-28178	George Harrison	"Got My Mind Set on You" / "Lay His Head"	12.10.87	03.10.87
W8131	7-28131	George Harrison	"When We Was Fab" / "Zig Zag"	25.01.88	30.01.88
W7913	7-27913	George Harrison	"This Is Love" / "Breath Away from Heaven"	13.06.88	12.05.88
W2696	–	George Harrison	"Cheer Down" / "Poor Little Girl"	27.11.89	–
R 6601^{[2]}	7243 5 52117 7 4	George Harrison	"Any Road" / "Marwa Blues"	12.05.03	–
		Jakob Dylan, Dhani Harrison, Amos Lee, Lukas Nelson, Willie Nelson	"For Real"	2019	2019
	DH0007	Ravi Shankar	"I Am Missing You" RSD 12" Blue Vinyl	2022	
		Cat Stevens	"Here Comes The Sun"	2023	2023
	DH0053	George Harrison/Beck	"Be Here Now"	2025	2025
	DH0055	Billy Idol feat Avril Lavigne	"77"	2025	2025

Albums

Catalogue Number		Artist	Title	Release Date	
(United Kingdom) UK	(United States) US	Artist	Title	(United Kingdom) UK	(United States) US
	ST- 3350	George Harrison	Wonderwall Music	01.11.68	01.11.68
		George Harrison	Electronic Sound	09.05.69	09.05.69
		George Harrison	All Things Must Pass	27.11.70	27.11.70
		Jon Lord	Gemini Suite	1971	1971
		George Harrison	Concert of Bangladesh	1972	1972
		Ravi Shankar	In Concert 1972	22.01.73	22.01.73
		George Harrison	Living in the Material World	30.05.73	30.05.73
		George Harrison	Dark Horse	09.12.74	09.12.74
		Jon Lord	Windows	1974	1974
		Ravi Shankar	Shankar Family & Friends	20.09.74	20.09.74
AMLH 22001	SP-22001	Splinter	The Place I Love	20.09.74	25.09.74
AMLH 22002	SP-22002	Ravi Shankar	Shankar Family & Friends	20.09.74	07.10.74
		Splinter	The Place I Love	1974	1974
		George Harrison	Extra Texture (Read All About It)		22.09.75
		Splinter	Harder To Live	1975	1975
AMLH 22003	SP-22003	Jiva	Jiva	31.10.75	06.10.75
AMLH 22006	SP-22006	Splinter	Harder to Live	24.10.75	06.10.75
AMLH 22005	SP-22005	Henry McCullough	Mind Your Own Business!	24.10.75	20.10.75
		Jiva	Jiva	1975	1975
		Henry McCullough	Mind Your Own Business!	1975	1975
		Attitudes	Attitudes	1975	1975
		Cat Stevens	Numbers	30.11.75	30.11.75
		Jon Lord	Sarabande	1976	1976
		George Harrison	Thirty Three & 1/3	19.11.76	19.11.76
		George Harrison	The Best of George Harrison		08.11.76
		Ravi Shankar	Ravi Shankar's Music Festival from India	23.09.76	23.09.76
AMLH 22004	SP-22004	Stairsteps	2nd Resurrection	19.03.76	06.02.76
AMLH 22007	SP-22007	Ravi Shankar	Ravi Shankar's Music Festival from India	19.03.76	06.02.76
AMLH 22008	SP-22008	Attitudes	Attitudes	19.03.76	06.02.76
K 56319	DH 3005	George Harrison	Thirty Three & 1/3	19.11.76	24.11.76
		Splinter	Two Man Band	1977	1977
		Attitudes	Good News	1977	1977
		Cat Stevens	Izitso	04.77	04.77
K 56385	DH 3021	Attitudes	Good News	03.06.77	05.05.77
K 563xx	DH 3022	Keni Burke	Keni Burke	16.08.77	
		Keni Burke	Keni Burke	1977	1977
K 56403	DH 3073	Splinter	Two Man Band	07.10.77	03.10.77
		Cat Stevens	Back To Earth	03.12.78	03.12.78
K 56562	DHK 3255	George Harrison	George Harrison	16.02.79	14.02.79
K 56870	DHK 3492	George Harrison	Somewhere in England	05.06.81	01.06.81
923 734-1	1-23734	George Harrison	Gone Troppo	08.11.82	27.10.82
		Jon Lord	Before I Forget	1982	1982
		Leon Russell	Hank Wilson Vol. II	1984	1984
WX 123	1-25643	George Harrison	Cloud Nine	02.11.87	
WX 312	1-25726	George Harrison	Best of Dark Horse 1976–1989	23.10.89	17.10.89
		Leon Russell	Hymns of Christmas	1995	1995
		Ravi Shankar	Chants of India	06.05.97	06.05.97
		Leon Russell	Hank Wilson Vol. III	1998	1998
		Leon Russell	Face in the Crowd	1999	1999
		Joe Strummer	Rock Art and the X-Ray Style	18.10.99	18.10.99
		Leon Russell	Crazy Love	2000	2000
		Joe Strummer	Global a-Go-Go	24.07.01	24.07.01
		Leon Russell	Guitar Blues	2001	2001
		Leon Russell	Rhythm and Bluegrass	2001	2001
		Leon Russell	Signature Songs	2001	2001
7243 5 41969 1 x^{[2]}		George Harrison	Brainwashed	18.11.02	
		Leon Russell	Moonlight and Love Songs	2002	2002
		Joe Strummer	Streetcore	21.10.03	21.10.03
GHBOX 1/7243 5 94232 0 3^{[2]}	CDP 7243 5 97051 0 1	George Harrison	The Dark Horse Years 1976–1992^{[3]}	23.02.04	
		George Harrison	Let It Roll	16.06.06	16.06.06
		Cat Stevens	An Other Cup	14.11.06	14.11.06
		Leon Russell	Angel in Disguise	2006	2006
			Collaborations Boxset		
		Leon Russell	A Mighty Flood	2008	2008
		Leon Russell	In Your Dreams	2008	2008
		Leon Russell	Almost Piano	2008	2008
		Leon Russell	Bad Country	2008	2008
		Cat Stevens	Roadsinger	05.05.09	05.05.09
		Leon Russell	Best of Hank Wilson	2009	2009
R2-525469	–	Ravi Shankar and George Harrison	Collaborations^{[4]}	19.10.10	
		George Harrison	Early Takes	01.05.12	01.05.12
		Leon Russell	Snapshot	2013	2013
		Cat Stevens	Tell 'Em I'm Gone	27.10.14	27.10.14
		Joe Strummer	001	2018	2018
		Attitudes	Ain't Love Enough		
	DH0002	Ravi Shanker	Chants of India	2020	
	DH0002/DH0002CD/DH0002CS	Joe Strummer	Assembly	2021	2021
	DH0003	Joe Strummer	Junco Partner (Record Store Day 12" Picture Disc Single)	2021	2021
	DH0004/DH0004CD	Billy Idol	The Roadside EP	17.09.21	17.09.21
	DH0005/DH0005CD	Billy Idol	Happy Holidays	2021	2021
	DH0006	Joe Strummer	Johnny Appleseed (Record Store Day 12" Pink Vinyl Single)	2021	2021
	DH0008/DH0008CD	Billy Idol	The Cage EP Standard 1LP Black Vinyl / Limited Edition 1LP Blue Vinyl / 1CD	2022	2022
	DH0009/DH0009CD	Joe Strummer	002 Box Set	2022	2022
	DH0012	Dark Horse Records	Dark Horse Records The Best of 1974–1977	2022	2022
	DH0013	Joe Strummer	Live at Music Millennium	2022	2022
	538856301	Yusuf/Cat Stevens	King Of A Land	2023	2023
	DH0010/DH0010CD	Ravi Shankar	Shankar Family & Friends	2023	2023
	DH0011/DH0011CD	Leon Russell	Signature Songs	2023	2023
	DH0014	Stairsteps	2^{nd} Resurrection	2023	2033
	DH0015	Joe Strummer	Streetcore 20th Anniversary White vinyl	2023	2023
	DH0022/DH0022CD	Joe Strummer	Streetcore 20th Anniversary Black vinyl w/art print	2023	2023
	DH0016/DH0016B/DH0016CD	Joe Strummer	Live at Acton Town Hall Limited Edition 2LP Clear Vinyl	2023	2023
	DH0018	Ravi Shankar & Ali Akbar Khan	In Concert 1972	2023	2023
	DH0019	Leon Russell	Hank Wilson Vol. II	2023	2023
	DH0020	Ravi Shankar	Ravi Shankar's Music Festival From India	2023	2023
	DH0021	Splinter	The Place I Love	2023	2023
	538856301	Yusuf/Cat Stevens	King of A Land	2023	2023
	DH0024/DH0024XUS/4050538941944	Nina Simone	Little Girl Blue Limited-edition, pink-colored Barnes & Noble exclusive	2024	2024
	DH0032/DH0048/DH0048CD	Joe Strummer	Rock Art and the X-Ray Style 25th Anniversary	2024	2024
	DH0049/DH0049CD	Steve Perry	The Season 3	2024	2024
	DH0033Z/DH0033CD	George Harrison	Wonderwall Music	2024/2025	2024/2025
	DH0034Z	George Harrison	Electronic Sound	2024	2024
	DH0035CD	George Harrison	Let It Roll	2024	2024
	DH0050/DH0050CD/DH0050Z	George Harrison	Living in the Material World (50^{th} Anniversary)”	2024	2024
	DH0051	Leon Russell	Hymns of Christmas	November 29, 2024	November 29, 2024
	DH0036	Huun-Huur-Tu, Carmen Rizzo & Dhani Harrison	Dreamers In The Field	2024	2024
	DH0025	Yusuf/Cat Stevens	Numbers	April 20, 2024	April 26, 2024
	DH0026	Yusuf/Cat Stevens	Izitso	April 20, 2024	April 26, 2024
	DH0029	Yusuf/Cat Stevens	Roadsinger	2024/2025	2024/2025
	DH0027	Yusuf/Cat Stevens	Back To Earth	2025	2025
	DH0034CD	George Harrison	Electronic Sound	2025	2025
	DH0035	George Harrison	Let It Roll	2025	2025
	DH0037/DH0037CD/DH0037Z	George Harrison	All Things Must Pass 50 Anniversary	2025	2025
	DH0038/DH0038CD	George Harrison	Dark Horse	2025	2025
	DH0039/DH0039CD	George Harrison	Extra Texture	2025	2025
	DH0040/DH0040CD	George Harrison	Thirty Three & 1/3	2025	2025
	DH0041/DH0041CD	George Harrison	George Harrison	2025	2025
	DH0042/DH0042CD	George Harrison	Somewhere In England	2025	2025
	DH0043/DH0043CD	George Harrison	Gone Troppo	2025	2025
	DH0044/DH0044CD	George Harrison	Cloud Nine	2025	2025
	DH0045/DH0045CD	George Harrison	Live In Japan	2025	2025
	DH0046/DH0046CD	George Harrison	Brainwashed	2025	2025
	DH0047/DH0047CD	George Harrison	Early Takes	2025	2025
	DH0017/DH0017EX/DH0017CD	Benmont Tench	The Melancholy Season	2025	2025
	DH0023	Jon Lord	Gemini Suite	2025	2025
	DH0031	Jon Lord	Windows	2025	2025
	DH0052	Billy Idol	Dream Into It	2025	2025
	DH0056	Ivan Shopov, Carmen Rizzo, Dhani Harrison featuring New Bulgarian Voices & Georgi Petkov	Ascending Into Silence	2025	2025
	DH0028	Yusuf/Cat Stevens	An Other Cup	2026	2026
	DH0030	Yusuf/Cat Stevens	Tell 'Em I'm Gone	2026	2026
	DH0057	Billy Preston	That's The Way God Planned It Purple Vinyl Resissue	2026	2026
	DH0058	Billy Preston	Encouraging Words Gold Vinyl Reissue	2026	2026
	DH0059	Leon Russell	The Best of Hank Wilson A Record Store Day 2026 release	2026	4/18/2026
	DH0060/964212791	R. Carlos Nakai	Canyon Trilogy Double-vinyl reissue for Record Store Day 2026	2026	4/18/2026
	DH0061	Joe Strummer	Global A Go-Go Splatter Color Vinyl Reissue A Record Store Day 2026 release	2026	4/18/2026
	DH0062	The Radha Krsna Temple	The Radha Krsna Temple Orange Vinyl Reissue A Record Store Day 2026 release	2026	4/18/2026

=== Digital releases ===
ARTIST	TITLE	RELEASE DATE
Jakob Dylan, Dhani Harrison, Amos Lee, Lukas Nelson, Micah Nelson & Willie Nelson	"For Real–For Tom"	2019
Splinter	“Harder To Live”	2022
Splinter	“Two Man Band”	2022
Henry McCullough	"Mind Your Own Business"	2022
Jiva	Jiva	2022
Attitudes	Attitudes	2022
Attitudes	Good News	2022
Keni Burke	Keni Burke	2022
Leon Russell	A Mighty Flood	2022
Leon Russell	Almost Piano	2022
Leon Russell	Angel In Disguise	2022
Leon Russell	Bad Country	2022
Leon Russell	Best of Hank Wilson	2022
Leon Russell	Crazy Love	2022
Leon Russell	Face In The Crowd	2022
Leon Russell	Guitar Blues	2022
Leon Russell	Hank Wilson Vol. III	2022
Leon Russell	In Your Dreams	2022
Leon Russell	Live At Gilley's	2022
Leon Russell	Moonlight and Love Songs	2022
Leon Russell	Rhythm and Bluegrass	2022
Leon Russell	The American Dream	2022
Joe Strummer	002 (Dolby Atmos)	2022
The 101ers (feat. Joe Strummer)	Elgin Avenue Breakdown (Revisited)	2023
Yusuf/Cat Stevens	Here Comes The Sun	2023
Yusuf/Cat Stevens	Majikat	2023
Jon Lord	Sarabunde	2023
Jon Lord	Before I Forget	2023
Dick & Mary	Dick & Mary	2023
George Harrison	Wonderwall Music (Dolby Atmos)	2023
George Harrison	Electronic Sound (Dolby Atmos)	2023
George Harrison	All Things Must Pass 50^{th} Anniversary (Dolby Atmos)	2023
George Harrison	Living in the Material World 50^{th} Anniversary (Dolby Atmos)	2023
George Harrison	Dark Horse (Dolby Atmos)	2023
George Harrison	Extra Texture (Dolby Atmos)	2023
George Harrison	Thirty Three & 1/3 (Dolby Atmos)	2023
George Harrison	George Harrison (Dolby Atmos)	2023
George Harrison	Somewhere in England (Dolby Atmos)	2023
George Harrison	Gone Troppo (Dolby Atmos)	2023
George Harrison	Cloud Nine (Dolby Atmos)	2023
George Harrison	Concert For Bangladesh (Dolby Atmos)	2024
Steve Perry	The Season (Dolby Atmos)	2024
Steve Perry	The Season 3 (Dolby Atmos)	2024
Steve Perry	Traces	2024
Steve Perry & Willie Nelson	"Faithfully" (Standard audio and Dolby Atmos)	2025
Robin Nolan	For The Love Of George	2025
Billy Idol	Dream Into It includes "’77" feat. Avril Lavigne (Dolby Atmos)	2025
Traveling Wilburys	Vol. 1	2026
Traveling Wilburys	Vol. 3	2026

Notes

^{1} Also released as a picture disc, catalog number K 17423P
^{2} Released by Dark Horse/Parlophone.
^{3} Box set of Harrison's remastered Dark Horse years albums: Thirty Three & 1/3 (1977) to Cloud Nine (1987).
^{4} Box set consisting of Shankar's two Harrison-produced albums on Dark Horse – Ravi Shankar's Music Festival from India and Shankar Family & Friends – together with Chants of India (1997) and a DVD containing film of a 1974 Musical Festival from India performance at the Royal Albert Hall, London.

== See also ==
- Lists of record labels
- George Harrison discography

== Bibliography ==
- Badgley, Aaron (2023). Dark Horse Records: The Story of George Harrison's Post-Beatles Record Label. Tewkesbury, Gloucestershire, UK: Sonicbond. ISBN 9781789522877.

== Sources ==
- Keith Badman, The Beatles Diary Volume 2: After the Break-Up 1970–2001, Omnibus Press (London, 2001; ISBN 0-7119-8307-0).
- Alan Clayson, George Harrison, Sanctuary (London, 2003; ISBN 1-86074-489-3).
- Peter Doggett, You Never Give Me Your Money: The Beatles After the Breakup, It Books (New York, NY, 2011; ISBN 978-0-06-177418-8).
- The Editors of Rolling Stone, Harrison, Rolling Stone Press/Simon & Schuster (New York, NY, 2002; ISBN 0-7432-3581-9).
- Chris Hunt (ed.), NME Originals: Beatles – The Solo Years 1970–1980, IPC Ignite! (London, 2005).
- Ian Inglis, The Words and Music of George Harrison, Praeger (Santa Barbara, CA, 2010; ISBN 978-0-313-37532-3).
- Peter Lavezzoli, The Dawn of Indian Music in the West, Continuum (New York, NY, 2006; ISBN 0-8264-2819-3).
- Simon Leng, While My Guitar Gently Weeps: The Music of George Harrison, Hal Leonard (Milwaukee, WI, 2006; ISBN 1-4234-0609-5).
- Chip Madinger & Mark Easter, Eight Arms to Hold You: The Solo Beatles Compendium, 44.1 Productions (Chesterfield, MO, 2000; ISBN 0-615-11724-4).
- Robert Rodriguez, Fab Four FAQ 2.0: The Beatles' Solo Years, 1970–1980, Backbeat Books (Milwaukee, WI, 2010; ISBN 978-1-4165-9093-4).
- Bruce Spizer, The Beatles Solo on Apple Records, 498 Productions (New Orleans, LA, 2005; ISBN 0-9662649-5-9).
- Gary Tillery, Working Class Mystic: A Spiritual Biography of George Harrison, Quest Books (Wheaton, IL, 2011; ISBN 978-0-8356-0900-5).
- Bob Woffinden, The Beatles Apart, Proteus (London, 1981; ISBN 0-906071-89-5).
