= Raga Mala (book) =

1997 autobiography by Ravi Shankar

- Author: Ravi Shankar
- Genre: Memoir
- Publisher: Genesis Publications
- Publication date: 1997
- Media type: Book
- Pages: 352 (1st edn); 336 (1999 Welcome Rain edn)
- ISBN: 0904351467 (1st edn)

Raga Mala is an autobiographic work by Indian classical musician Ravi Shankar, published in 1997 as a hand-bound, limited edition book by Genesis Publications. The initial print run was limited to 2000 signed and individually numbered copies, with a foreword by George Harrison, who also served as Shankar's editor. In addition, Oliver Craske was credited with providing "additional narrative".

In May 1998, American music magazine Billboard announced the release there of a boxed deluxe edition of the book (priced at $342), which included two CDs of music and a packet of incense.

The book was Shankar's second autobiography, after the 1968 publication of My Music, My Life. Following its original edition, Raga Mala was issued in mass-market format by New York publishers Welcome Rain in September 1999.

== Reception ==
Reviewing the Welcome Rain edition in November 1999, Kirkus Reviews commented that "the most lyrical and introspective pages of his autobiography are reserved for his wife, Sukanya, and his daughter and musical disciple, Anoushka", and concluded of the book: "Unpretentious and [as] spiritually illuminating as Shankar's music." Writing for Soundchecks, Amy Harlib considered Raga Mala a "surprisingly frank account" and described the author's style in the following terms: "a blend of charm and candour; dignity and humility; spiritual depth and sparkling sense of humour; and a never-ending thirst for knowledge, exploration and growth."

Billboard reviewer Bradley Bambarger wrote that "In many ways, the story of Ravi Shankar is the story of Indian culture in the West", and added: "he is also one of the most inspiring composer/performers of the 20th century – a fact reinforced by his breathtaking autobiography …" In Rough Guides' World Music volume, Ken Hunt describes Raga Mala as "highly recommended".

== Sources ==
- Dale C. Allison Jr., The Love There That's Sleeping: The Art and Spirituality of George Harrison, Continuum (New York, NY, 2006; ISBN 978-0-8264-1917-0).
- Keith Badman, The Beatles Diary Volume 2: After the Break-Up 1970–2001, Omnibus Press (London, 2001; ISBN 0-7119-8307-0).
- Alan Clayson, George Harrison, Sanctuary (London, 2003; ISBN 1-86074-489-3).
- Collaborations, book accompanying Collaborations box set (Dark Horse Records, 2010; produced by Olivia Harrison; package design by Drew Lorimer & Olivia Harrison).
- Peter Doggett, You Never Give Me Your Money: The Beatles After the Breakup, It Books (New York, NY, 2011; ISBN 978-0-06-177418-8).
- The Editors of Rolling Stone, Harrison, Rolling Stone Press/Simon & Schuster (New York, NY, 2002; ISBN 0-7432-3581-9).
- Elliot J. Huntley, Mystical One: George Harrison – After the Break-up of the Beatles, Guernica Editions (Toronto, ON, 2006; ISBN 1-55071-197-0).
- Ian Inglis, The Words and Music of George Harrison, Praeger (Santa Barbara, CA, 2010; ISBN 978-0-313-37532-3).
- Peter Lavezzoli, The Dawn of Indian Music in the West, Continuum (New York, NY, 2006; ISBN 0-8264-2819-3).
- Simon Leng, While My Guitar Gently Weeps: The Music of George Harrison, Hal Leonard (Milwaukee, WI, 2006; ISBN 1-4234-0609-5).
- Robert Rodriguez, Fab Four FAQ 2.0: The Beatles' Solo Years, 1970–1980, Backbeat Books (Milwaukee, WI, 2010; ISBN 978-1-4165-9093-4).
- Ravi Shankar, My Music, My Life, Mandala Publishing (San Rafael, CA, 2007; ISBN 978-1-60109-005-8).
- Gary Tillery, Working Class Mystic: A Spiritual Biography of George Harrison, Quest Books (Wheaton, IL, 2011; ISBN 978-0-8356-0900-5).
- World Music: The Rough Guide (Volume 2: Latin and North America, Caribbean, India, Asia and Pacific), Rough Guides/Penguin (London, 2000; ISBN 1-85828-636-0).
