= Teardrops (George Harrison song) =

- UK picture sleeve

Single by George Harrison

from the album Somewhere in England
- B-side: "Save the World"
- Released: 20 July 1981
- Studio: FPSHOT (Oxfordshire)
- Genre: Power pop
- Length: 4:07 (album version); 3:20 (US single edit)
- Label: Dark Horse
- Songwriter: George Harrison
- Producers: George Harrison; Ray Cooper

George Harrison singles chronology
"All Those Years Ago" (1981)	"Teardrops" (1981)	"Wake Up My Love" (1982)

Somewhere in England track listing
- 10 tracks Side one: 1. "Blood from a Clone"; 2. "Unconsciousness Rules"; 3. "Life Itself"; 4. "All Those Years Ago"; 5. "Baltimore Oriole"; Side two: 6. "Teardrops"; 7. "That Which I Have Lost"; 8. "Writing's on the Wall"; 9. "Hong Kong Blues"; 10. "Save the World"

"Teardrops" is a song by the English rock musician George Harrison from his ninth studio album Somewhere in England (1981). It was also issued as the second single off the album, in July 1981. As with the lead single, "All Those Years Ago", Harrison completed the song after Warner Bros. Records had rejected his initial submission of Somewhere in England in September 1980. In response to Warner's concerns, he wrote "Teardrops" as an attempt at a commercially oriented song.

Harrison recorded the song at his FPSHOT studio in England with Ray Cooper as his co-producer. Despite some reviewers predicting it as a hit, the single failed to achieve commercial success. In the United States, it peaked at number 102 on Billboard's Bubbling Under the Hot 100 chart and number 88 on the Cash Box Top 100.

== Background ==
George Harrison wrote "Teardrops" while on holiday in Hawaii in October 1980, after Warner Bros. Records, the company that distributed his Dark Horse record label, had rejected his initial submission of Somewhere in England. In need of a best-selling release to boost its revenue for the final quarter of 1980, Warner's invoked its contractual right to demand that Harrison replace four of the songs. The company deemed the album to be too laid-back, not sufficiently contemporary-sounding, and lacking commercial potential. (Note: Warner Bros. were also concerned that Harrison's album would suffer commercially when released beside John Lennon and Yoko Ono's Double Fantasy. Distributed by the company on behalf of Geffen Records, Double Fantasy was a highly anticipated release, as Lennon's first album in five years, and a work conceived for a contemporary pop audience.)

Harrison later said that Warner's had complained that the album lacked an obvious single, and others had told him that a hit song had to be about "love gained or lost, directed at 14- to 20-year-olds". According to Derek Taylor, who presented Somewhere in England to the Warner's executives in late September, and then had to relay their disapproval, Harrison resolved to give the company the market-focused material they wanted.

== Composition and recording ==
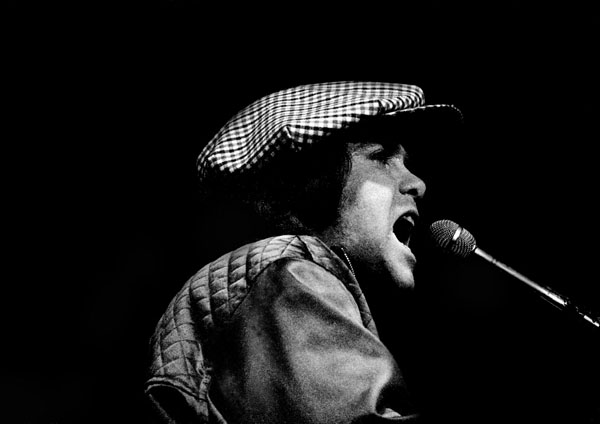
Some commentators liken "Teardrops" to the work of Elton John – pictured performing live during his 1979 tour with Ray Cooper, who co-produced Harrison's song. (Photo: Eddie Mallin)

Whereas Harrison wrote "Blood from a Clone" as a riposte to Warner's intrusion, "Teardrops" was his attempt to satisfy the executives' demand for a hit single. (Note: Around this time, Harrison also wrote "Wrack My Brain" for Ringo Starr, who had a top 40 hit with the song, as a further attack on Warner's demands on its artists.) The song is in the key of D and set to a medium-fast rock beat. Music journalist Jason Anderson describes it as a "mid-tempo shuffle". In his lyrics, Harrison sings from the perspective of a grief-stricken lover. Over the choruses, he states that, having cried "buckets full of teardrops", he appears to have "taken over from the rain". Author Alan Clayson writes that the song has the same lachrymose theme as "Tears of the World", one of the submissions that Warner's had objected to, but without the socio-political context.

Harrison recorded "Teardrops" at his Friar Park studio in Oxfordshire during the second period of sessions for the album, beginning in November 1980 and extending to mid January 1981. Besides Harrison on guitars, the musicians were Herbie Flowers on bass, Ray Cooper on percussion, Dave Mattacks on drums and Mike Moran on keyboards. Cooper also helped produce the song. As on much of Somewhere in England, the track makes prominent use of synthesizer, a sound not commonly associated with Harrison's music. Beatle biographers Chip Madinger and Mark Easter liken "Teardrops"' feel and melody to the work of Elton John, as does author Ian Inglis, who highlights its resemblance to several of John's 1970s hits. (Note: Inglis cites John's "Crocodile Rock", "Philadelphia Freedom", "Don't Go Breaking My Heart" and "Part-Time Love" as examples.) Inglis partly attributes this to Cooper, who had worked extensively with John. According to music journalist John Metzger, as on the three other new tracks – "Blood from a Clone", "All Those Years Ago" and "That Which I Have Lost" – the production had "the peppy, pop-oriented sheen" that Warner's deemed necessary.

== Release and reception ==
Somewhere in England was issued on 1 June 1981, with "Teardrops" sequenced as the first track on side two of the LP. The song was then selected as the second single off the album, backed by "Save the World". The release took place on 20 July in the United States and 31 July in Britain. The song's publishing was assigned to Harrison's company Ganga, and subsequently to Umlaut Corporation. For the US single, the track was shortened to 3:20 in length, through the removal of a 41-second portion that begins at 2:31 on the unedited recording.

In its issue dated 1 August, Record World magazine listed "Teardrops" first among its three "Hits of the Week" singles predictions. The reviewer wrote: "Mellifluous keyboards and a resounding title chorus that won't quit are an unbeatable combination on this follow-up to the top 5 'All Those Years Ago.' It's a natural for pop radio." Billboard also identified the song as a top 30 chart contender, describing it as a "lilting midtempo tune" in a similar vein to recent hit songs by Cliff Richard. The reviewer added: "It's punchy and energetic, a far cry from [Harrison's] ponderous introspective ballads of the mid '70s." In an otherwise highly unfavourable review of Somewhere in England, for Creem, Mitchell Cohen said that "Actually, 'Teardrops' is OK." The Boston Globe critic James Simon likened it to Harrison's 1977 hit "Crackerbox Palace", as an example of "a simple pop ditty ... with his sincere voice cutting through a perky arrangement" and therefore one of the few interesting tracks on the album.

The single failed to achieve commercial success. It missed the UK top 75, although Record Mirror included the song in the magazine's inaugural 25 "bubbling under" placings, on 15 August, compiled from the official BMRB/Music Week chart data. On the rival chart compiled by the UK industry publication Record Business, the single placed at number 88.

In the US, "Teardrops" was listed at number 102 on the Billboard Bubbling Under the Hot 100 chart and peaked at number 88 on the Cash Box Top 100. On Billboard's Rock Albums and Top Tracks chart, measuring radio airplay, the song reached number 51. In November 1981, "Teardrops" was issued on a new single in the US, as the B-side to "All Those Years Ago".

== Aftermath and retrospective assessments ==
Harrison said that 1980 was the year when he stopped enjoying being a recording artist and "couldn't relate" to contemporary pop music. After completing his tenth studio album Gone Troppo (1982), he withdrew from music-making for over four years, partly as a result of the compromises he was forced to make with Somewhere in England, and partly because he had long found his role as a film producer with his company HandMade Films more rewarding. With "Wake Up My Love", the lead single from Gone Troppo, Harrison returned to the pop formula of "Teardrops". According to Alan Clayson, this was a gesture designed to satisfy Warner Bros. in advance, while Harrison otherwise had no interest in the album's commercial performance and, as with Somewhere in England, made no attempt to promote the release.

Chip Madinger and Mark Easter say that "Teardrops" was "probably the best of the toe-tappers that George composed for the revised Somewhere in England", and they describe its commercial failure as "inexplicable". Ian Inglis calls the song "a perfectly plausible piece of middle-of-the-road pop" that, through its origins as a purpose-written hit song to satisfy commercial considerations, "lacks Harrison's signature". Harrison biographer Simon Leng similarly describes the track as a "perfectly pleasant ... well-produced power pop tune with a catchy hook and an attractive bridge", but he dismisses it as "hack work" and "the kind of forgettable pop fluff that Harrison had been trying to escape for years". Clayson says that "Teardrops" has "an ebullient backing and an ear-grabbing melody" and deserved to be a bigger hit than "All Those Years Ago". Writing in 2018 for Uncut's Ultimate Music Guide issue on Harrison, Jason Anderson complained that the song's "thin veneer of pep can't disguise its formulaic nature or its singer's indifference".

In a 1992 interview coinciding with Harrison receiving the inaugural Billboard Century Award, Timothy White suggested "Teardrops" when asking him about his favourite, "overlooked" compositions. Harrison replied that it was "quite a nice song", adding: "That could be done by some black group, because you could make a good dance routine to [it]."

== Personnel ==
Per Simon Leng:

- George Harrison – vocal, guitar
- Herbie Flowers – bass
- Ray Cooper – percussion
- Dave Mattacks – drums
- Mike Moran – keyboards

== Chart performance ==
Chart	Peak position
US Billboard Bubbling Under Hot 100	102
US Billboard Rock Albums and Top Tracks	51
US Cash Box Top 100	88

== Sources ==
- Badman, Keith (2001). The Beatles Diary Volume 2: After the Break-Up 1970–2001. London: Omnibus Press. ISBN 978-0-7119-8307-6.
- Clayson, Alan (2003). George Harrison. London: Sanctuary. ISBN 1-86074-489-3.
- Doggett, Peter (2011). You Never Give Me Your Money: The Beatles After the Breakup. New York, NY: It Books. ISBN 978-0-06-177418-8.
- The Editors of Rolling Stone (2002). Harrison. New York, NY: Rolling Stone Press. ISBN 978-0-7432-3581-5.
- Harrison, George (with Derek Taylor; Olivia Harrison) (2017). I, Me, Mine – The Extended Edition. Guildford, UK: Genesis Publications. ISBN 978-1-905662-40-1.
- Harry, Bill (2003). The George Harrison Encyclopedia. London: Virgin Books. ISBN 978-0-7535-0822-0.
- Huntley, Elliot J. (2006). Mystical One: George Harrison – After the Break-up of the Beatles. Toronto, ON: Guernica Editions. ISBN 1-55071-197-0.
- Inglis, Ian (2010). The Words and Music of George Harrison. Santa Barbara, CA: Praeger. ISBN 978-0-313-37532-3.
- Kahn, Ashley, ed. (2020). George Harrison on George Harrison: Interviews and Encounters. Chicago, IL: Chicago Review Press. ISBN 978-1-64160-051-4.
- Larkin, Colin, ed. (2011). The Encyclopedia of Popular Music (5th edn). London: Omnibus Press. ISBN 978-0-85712-595-8.
- Leng, Simon (2006). While My Guitar Gently Weeps: The Music of George Harrison. Milwaukee, WI: Hal Leonard. ISBN 978-1-4234-0609-9.
- Madinger, Chip; Easter, Mark (2000). Eight Arms to Hold You: The Solo Beatles Compendium. Chesterfield, MO: 44.1 Productions. ISBN 0-615-11724-4.
- Rodriguez, Robert (2010). Fab Four FAQ 2.0: The Beatles' Solo Years, 1970–1980. Milwaukee, WI: Backbeat Books. ISBN 978-1-4165-9093-4.
- Woffinden, Bob (1981). The Beatles Apart. London: Proteus. ISBN 0-906071-89-5.
