= Life Itself (George Harrison song) =

Song by George Harrison

from the album Somewhere in England
- Released: 1 June 1981
- Genre: Rock
- Length: 4:25
- Label: Dark Horse
- Songwriter: George Harrison
- Producers: George Harrison, Ray Cooper

Somewhere in England track listing
- 10 tracks Side one: 1. "Blood from a Clone"; 2. "Unconsciousness Rules"; 3. "Life Itself"; 4. "All Those Years Ago"; 5. "Baltimore Oriole"; Side two: 6. "Teardrops"; 7. "That Which I Have Lost"; 8. "Writing's on the Wall"; 9. "Hong Kong Blues"; 10. "Save the World"

"Life Itself" is a song by the English musician George Harrison from his ninth studio album Somewhere in England (1981). Harrison also included it on his 1989 greatest-hits compilation Best of Dark Horse. As a love song to God, the track served as the artist's most overtly religious musical statement since 1974. The lyrics offer praise to Christ, Vishnu, Jehovah and Buddha, thereby marking a return to the concept of a universal deity, regardless of religious demarcation, that Harrison had first espoused in his 1970 hit single "My Sweet Lord".

Harrison recorded "Life Itself" at his Friar Park studio in England in 1980. The recording features multiple slide guitar parts, played by Harrison, and contributions from musicians such as Neil Larsen, Willie Weeks and Jim Keltner. Following Warner Bros. Records' rejection of the initial submission of Somewhere in England, forcing Harrison to rework the content of the album, Al Kooper added a Hammond organ part to the track.

"Life Itself" has received praise from reviewers, several of whom recognise it as a highlight of an otherwise disappointing album. Harrison's demo of the song appeared on the EP accompanying the limited-edition illustrated book Songs by George Harrison 2, published by Genesis Publications in 1992. He also agreed to its use in the 1993 audio-book format of author Deepak Chopra's Ageless Body, Timeless Mind, where the 1981 track accompanies a passage read by Chopra. In 1998, "Life Itself" was one of the Harrison compositions adapted by composers Steve Wood and Daniel May for the soundtrack to the IMAX documentary Everest.

== Background and composition ==
George Harrison wrote "Life Itself" and the other songs for his album Somewhere in England between mid 1979 and the early part of 1980. Harrison's songwriting at this time contrasted in tone with the light-heartedness of his two previous albums, Thirty Three & 1/3 (1976) and George Harrison (1979). Both of these works had continued to present a softening in the artist's spiritual vision since 1974, the year in which he had publicly espoused a hard-line Hindu religiosity in his North American concerts with Ravi Shankar and in devotional songs such as "It Is 'He' (Jai Sri Krishna)". While promoting his self-titled 1979 album, Harrison said that he was no longer interested in promoting so obvious a religious message as he had in his biggest hit, "My Sweet Lord". Later in 1979, the content of his HandMade Films comedy Monty Python's Life of Brian attracted controversy from Christian religious groups, a point to which Harrison later responded: "All it made fun of was people's stupidity in the story [of Jesus Christ] ... Actually it was upholding Him and knocking all the idiotic stuff that goes on around religion ..." Songs such as "Life Itself", "Writing's on the Wall" and "Sat Singing" nevertheless reflected his return to more spiritually focused songwriting, recalling the themes of Harrison's albums All Things Must Pass (1970) and Living in the Material World (1973).

Author Simon Leng draws parallels between "Life Itself" and "Every Grain of Sand", a song written by Bob Dylan later in 1980, midway through his born-again Christian period. According to Leng, the two compositions address a similar issue in their statements of faith, but whereas Dylan sings of "hanging in the balance of the reality of man", Harrison has "arrived at his destination" and is "making an offering" to his deity. Like Leng, theologian Dale Allison describes "Life Itself" as Harrison's "love song to God". Allison also notes that, as a progression from Harrison's more Hindu-focused exhortations up to 1974, the song's strong "theological assertions" reflect his recognition of Christ, a perspective that Harrison increasingly explored in subsequent decades.

The song is a slow ballad in the key of C. In his lyrics, Harrison's directly addresses his deity, whom he describes as variously a lover, a friend, the source of truth, and the essence of all "We taste, touch and feel". He recognises God as both "the breath of life itself" and "the light in death". Harrison also lists some of the names by which the deity is popularly referred: Christ, Vishnu, Buddha, Jehovah and "Our Lord". He finds further common ground in all faiths by saying that God, as "the One", is Govindam, Bismillah and "Creator of All". Regardless of the characterisations adopted by specific religions, the song depicts love as the essential quality in Harrison's vision of a deity.

== Recording ==
Harrison first taped a demo of "Life Itself" at his FPSHOT studio in Henley, Oxfordshire, shortly before beginning the recording of Somewhere in England in March 1980. Harrison played all the instruments on this early version, including electric guitars and ukulele. He then recorded the track during the main sessions for the album, held at FPSHOT through to September 1980. Aside from Harrison, who also served as producer, the musicians at the sessions were Neil Larsen and Gary Brooker (both on keyboards), Ray Cooper (percussion), Willie Weeks (bass) and Jim Keltner (drums). The latter's presence marked the first time he had played on a Harrison album since 1975, since when Keltner had become a key member in Dylan's backing band, as well as sharing Dylan's evangelical Christian beliefs.

The arrangement of Harrison's electric guitar parts – which include picked rhythm parts, slide riffs, and a separate slide part playing the solos and fills – changed little between the demo and the formal recording. Leng suggests that the latter was in fact built up from Harrison's demo.

After submitting Somewhere in England to Warner Bros. Records, the distributor of his Dark Horse record label, in late September 1980, Harrison was forced to rework the content of the album – including replacing four of the original songs – to ensure the release had more commercial appeal. Harrison chose to retain "Life Itself" and worked with Ray Cooper on a second version of the album. For these sessions, beginning in November, Harrison enlisted keyboardist Al Kooper to complete the recordings. Kooper overdubbed a Hammond organ part, adding to Brooker's original contribution. In Leng's description, the gospel inflections of this final addition combine with Harrison's backing vocals and "guitar choir" to "convey his spiritual vision in music". The mix of the song changed significantly between the original submission and the reworked album, for which Cooper was credited as a co-producer.

== Release and reception ==
Somewhere in England was released on 1 June 1981. "Life Itself" was sequenced as the third track, between "Unconsciousness Rules" and "All Those Years Ago", which was Harrison's tribute to his former Beatles bandmate John Lennon and another song to which Kooper added a key musical contribution. (Note: Kooper subsequently replaced the keyboard player in Dylan's tour band in late 1981, for a US tour that marked Dylan's gradual return to a more secular repertoire, in reaction to an unfavourable reaction from many critics and fans to his religious proselytising. According to Kooper, it was Harrison who recommended him to Dylan as a result of his playing on Somewhere in England.) The album was a relative commercial success, an outcome that was due largely to a public outpouring of grief in reaction to Lennon's murder in December 1980.

Although the album received mixed reviews, music critics responded favourably towards "Life Itself". Harry Thomas of Rolling Stone described the song as "an explicit paean to 'the One' in all His guises ... With beautifully filigreed overdubs of breathy, echoing voices and poignant slide-guitar figures ... the music conjures up a magical temple of mirrors." While less impressed with Somewhere in England generally, Thomas also wrote of "Life Itself" as "gorgeous and haunting" and a track that "sums up what [Harrison] does best and – judging from the care he lavishes on it – what he loves best". People magazine's reviewer admired the album as "a musical giant's defiant tribute to the value of life" and described the song as "a moving, warming ballad".

Conversely, writing in Creem, Mitchell Cohen cited the track as an example of the album's diminishing quality after the opening song, "Blood from a Clone", in which Harrison criticised Warner's, and he added: "'Life Itself' is God's resume, complete with noms d'omnipotence. ('You are the real love that I've got' George sings, as Olivia chalks up evidence for future alienation of affection charges.)" NME critic Bob Woffinden welcomed the song as an example of how the album's subject matter ranged beyond the "humdrum". He found it "only characteristic of [Harrison] to embrace more universal themes", adding that "probably only he could have composed a song entitled 'Life Itself'."

== Retrospective assessment and legacy ==
Elliot Huntley writes that Harrison clearly "had a soft spot" for "Life Itself". He included the song on his 1989 compilation album Best of Dark Horse, and his 1980 demo was the opening track on the EP accompanying Songs by George Harrison 2 in 1992. In an act that Leng terms "unprecedented", Harrison authorised the inclusion of "Life Itself", along with "Writing's on the Wall" and "That Which I Have Lost", on the audio book release of Deepak Chopra's bestseller Ageless Body Timeless Mind. It was also one of the Harrison compositions adapted in the Tibetan folk style by composers Steve Wood and Daniel May for the soundtrack to the 1998 IMAX documentary Everest. According to Huntley, Greg MacGillivray, the film's director, chose Harrison's music for its "spiritual quality" and "his ties to eastern religion". (Note: In a 1992 interview coinciding with his receiving the inaugural Billboard Century Award, Harrison named "Life Itself" first when Timothy White asked if he had a favourite, "overlooked" composition. Harrison said it was "one I liked a lot ... But it's not a rock and roll song; it's a mystical kind of lyric.")

Having interviewed Harrison for Guitar World magazine in 1987, Rip Rense admired the song's guitar parts as evidence of how effectively Harrison composed his solos. Rense added: "The conversational duet-solos in 'Life Itself' and 'Beautiful Girl' – where his solo guitars overlap and answer one another – are impressively imaginative, virtuosic."

In his review of the 2004 reissue of Somewhere in England, John Metzger of The Music Box described "Life Itself" as the highlight of the album and "a devotional ballad of utmost beauty". Writing for Blender that year, Paul Du Noyer recognised the song as the album's "standout track". James Griffiths of The Guardian paired "Life Itself" with the 1979 ballad "Your Love Is Forever" as two "transcendentally lovely" songs, and examples of how Harrison's Dark Horse releases were often unjustly overlooked. Simon Leng cites the same pair of songs as works that are "the closest to his musical 'soul'", whereby "[Harrison's] meticulous craftsmanship as a singer, guitar player, and arranger was used to create aural replicas of grace." Author Ian Inglis includes "Life Itself" among Harrison songs that possess "great charm, energy, and beauty" yet may be little known due to the lack of critical acclaim afforded their respective parent album. Inglis praises the song for its "gorgeous melody of rising and falling phrases" and adds: "It is a beautifully crafted and gently sung track ... his spiritual certainty is fixed, unchanging, and permanent."

== Personnel ==
According to authors Chip Madinger and Mark Easter (except where noted):

- George Harrison – vocals, electric guitars, slide guitars, backing vocals
- Neil Larsen – keyboards
- Gary Brooker – organ
- Al Kooper – Hammond organ
- Willie Weeks – bass
- Jim Keltner – drums
- Ray Cooper – percussion

== Sources ==
- Dale C. Allison Jr, The Love There That's Sleeping: The Art and Spirituality of George Harrison, Continuum (New York, NY, 2006; ISBN 978-0-8264-1917-0).
- Keith Badman, The Beatles Diary Volume 2: After the Break-Up 1970–2001, Omnibus Press (London, 2001; ISBN 0-7119-8307-0).
- Alan Clayson, George Harrison, Sanctuary (London, 2003; ISBN 1-86074-489-3).
- Peter Doggett, You Never Give Me Your Money: The Beatles After the Breakup, It Books (New York, NY, 2011; ISBN 978-0-06-177418-8).
- The Editors of Rolling Stone, Harrison, Rolling Stone Press/Simon & Schuster (New York, NY, 2002; ISBN 0-7432-3581-9).
- Bill Harry, The George Harrison Encyclopedia, Virgin Books (London, 2003; ISBN 978-0753508220).
- Clinton Heylin, Bob Dylan: Behind the Shades (20th Anniversary Edition), Faber and Faber (London, 2011; ISBN 978-0-571-27240-2).
- Elliot J. Huntley, Mystical One: George Harrison – After the Break-up of the Beatles, Guernica Editions (Toronto, ON, 2006; ISBN 1-55071-197-0).
- Chris Ingham, The Rough Guide to the Beatles, Rough Guides/Penguin (London, 2006; 2nd edn; ISBN 978-1-8483-6525-4).
- Ian Inglis, The Words and Music of George Harrison, Praeger (Santa Barbara, CA, 2010; ISBN 978-0-313-37532-3).
- Ashley Kahn (ed.), George Harrison on George Harrison: Interviews and Encounters, Chicago Review Press (Chicago, IL, 2020; ISBN 978-1-64160-051-4).
- Al Kooper, Backstage Passes & Backstabbing Bastards: Memoirs of a Rock 'n' Roll Survivor, Backbeat Books (New York, NY, 2008; ISBN 978-0-87930-922-0).
- Peter Lavezzoli, The Dawn of Indian Music in the West, Continuum (New York, NY, 2006; ISBN 0-8264-2819-3).
- Simon Leng, While My Guitar Gently Weeps: The Music of George Harrison, Hal Leonard (Milwaukee, WI, 2006; ISBN 1-4234-0609-5).
- Chip Madinger & Mark Easter, Eight Arms to Hold You: The Solo Beatles Compendium, 44.1 Productions (Chesterfield, MO, 2000; ISBN 0-615-11724-4).
- Robert Rodriguez, Fab Four FAQ 2.0: The Beatles' Solo Years, 1970–1980, Backbeat Books (Milwaukee, WI, 2010; ISBN 978-1-4165-9093-4).
- Mat Snow, The Beatles Solo: The Illustrated Chronicles of John, Paul, George, and Ringo After The Beatles (Volume 3: George), Race Point Publishing (New York, NY, 2013; ISBN 978-1-937994-26-6).
- Howard Sounes, Down the Highway: The Life of Bob Dylan, Doubleday (London, 2001; ISBN 0385-601255).
- Gary Tillery, Working Class Mystic: A Spiritual Biography of George Harrison, Quest Books (Wheaton, IL, 2011; ISBN 978-0-8356-0900-5).
- Bob Woffinden, The Beatles Apart, Proteus (London, 1981; ISBN 0-906071-89-5).
