= Save the World (George Harrison song) =

- US B-side face label

Song by George Harrison

from the album Somewhere in England
- Released: 1 June 1981
- Genre: Rock
- Length: 4:54
- Label: Dark Horse
- Songwriter: George Harrison
- Producers: George Harrison, Ray Cooper

Somewhere in England track listing
- 10 tracks Side one: 1. "Blood from a Clone"; 2. "Unconsciousness Rules"; 3. "Life Itself"; 4. "All Those Years Ago"; 5. "Baltimore Oriole"; Side two: 6. "Teardrops"; 7. "That Which I Have Lost"; 8. "Writing's on the Wall"; 9. "Hong Kong Blues"; 10. "Save the World"

"Save the World" is a song by English rock musician George Harrison, released as the final track of his 1981 album Somewhere in England. It was also the B-side of "Teardrops", which was the second single off the album. An environmental protest song, "Save the World" was Harrison's first composition to directly address topical issues such as the nuclear arms race, rainforest and wildlife devastation and the ecologically irresponsible practices of corporate concerns. Musically, the song partly recalls the style of the comedy troupe Monty Python.

Harrison recorded "Save the World" at his Friar Park studio in England in 1980. The recording includes sound effects that support the song's message of a world heading towards self-destruction, including bombs falling, a cash register, a street demonstration, and a nuclear explosion. In 1985, Harrison contributed a version of the song with amended lyrics to Greenpeace's self-titled fundraising album. "Save the World" also appeared on the home video Greenpeace: Non-Toxic Video Hits.

Since its release, the song has had a mixed reception from several music critics and biographers. While some writers recognise the track as imaginative and sincere, others highlight the disparity between the serious message and the quirky musical backing, or find it heavy-handed. In line with Harrison's wishes, a demo of "Save the World" appeared as the sole bonus track on the posthumously reissued Somewhere in England in 2004.

== Background and inspiration ==
As reproduced in the 2017 book I, Me, Mine – The Extended Edition, George Harrison dated the lyrics of "Save the World" to 24 February 1978, with Hana, Maui as the location. During that visit to Hawaii, Harrison completed the writing for his 1979 album George Harrison, which, as with its predecessor, Thirty Three & 1/3, reflected a light-heartedness that had been lacking in much of his work. He returned to the song when working on his album Somewhere in England, most of which was written between mid 1979 and the early part of 1980. As with a track Harrison wrote for Somewhere in England, "Tears of the World", "Save the World" conveys his disapproval at the ecological issues and political machinations threatening the world in the early 1980s.

During 1980, Harrison became a member of Greenpeace and CND; he also protested against the use of nuclear energy with Friends of the Earth, in London, and helped finance Vole, a green magazine launched by Monty Python member Terry Jones. Author Simon Leng describes "Save the World" as Harrison's first attempt at ecology-focused songwriting and a "quirky protest song" that marked "the culmination of the Pythonization of Harrison's music" at a time when he was increasingly associated with members of the Monty Python comedy troupe through his film company HandMade Films. While recognising "Save the World" as indicative of its composer's disillusion with the 1980s, Leng comments that Harrison had long valued the "madness" of Monty Python's comedy as "a mirror to the insanity of world events", and that his adoption of humour was a "peculiarly British" reaction to a grave situation.

== Composition ==
"Save the World" begins with a chorus, rather than a verse. In musicologist Thomas MacFarlane's view, the chord progression recalls Harrison's 1976 song "Crackerbox Palace". He finds the structure surprising since the verses and choruses "seem deliberately set off from one another", as if the writer is breaking the fourth wall, a device often employed by Harrison.

In the lyrics, Harrison sings of "This planet's rape, how we've abused it". He first addresses the nuclear arms race being waged between the United States and the Soviet Union, and laments the introduction of intergalactic weapons. He then addresses the devastation of the world's rainforests for commercial gain and the threat to wildlife. He refers to the Save the Whales environmental campaign and how Greenpeace's attempts to limit whale hunting had been thwarted by the interests of "dog food salesmen". He also laments the irresponsibility of arms manufacturers and, with regard to plutonium stockpiles, concludes: "Now you can make your own H-bomb / Right in the kitchen with your mom." He then denigrates the use of nuclear power as a "half-wit's answer to a need" that causes cancer. In the final verse, Harrison attributes the world's environmental problems to just a few profit-seeking individuals. He ends on what he promises to be "a happy note" by stating that a simple solution lies in the realisation that "God [lives] in your heart".

In a 1987 interview, Harrison said that "Save the World" was meant to be "serious and funny at the same time". (Note: His handwritten lyrics include a verse that was omitted from the published song: "Those people in the military / All need a dose of LSD / Then send them to a yoga class / To find their souls [and] forget their ass.") Contrasting with the subject matter, the music recalls the comedy songs of Monty Python. In the description of Harrison biographer Alan Clayson, the style is "quasi-reggae", while author Ian Inglis refers to it being sung on the official recording "in a deceptively sweet voice to a march tempo". Leng also likens the song's musical aspects to Harrison's 1975 tribute to comedian Legs Larry Smith, "His Name Is Legs (Ladies and Gentlemen)", in terms of its groove and musical arrangement. (Note: MacFarlane likens the arrangement to "Crackerbox Palace", and to Harrison's 1968 Beatles track "Savoy Truffle" in the use of compressed horn sounds.)

== Recording ==
Harrison recorded "Save the World" during the main sessions for Somewhere in England, held at his FPSHOT studio in Henley, Oxfordshire, between March and September 1980. Aside from Harrison, who played guitars and self-produced the sessions, the musicians on the track were Neil Larsen and Gary Brooker (both on keyboards), Willie Weeks (bass), Jim Keltner (drums), Ray Cooper (percussion) and Tom Scott (horns). Harrison added various sound effects throughout the recording, including the sound of bombs being dropped, a cash register, an army on the march, gunfire, and a street demonstration. The majority of these effects appear midway through the song, accompanied by a Moog synthesizer solo, after which the section concludes with the sound of a nuclear explosion. A baby's cry then accompanies the song's return. MacFarlane describes the effects over the instrumental break as a foray into musique concrète, but he also sees them as representing excerpts from a film soundtrack in their vividness. He adds that aside from drawing on elements of Monty Python and the Beatles, the combination of lyrical imagery and sound effects gives the song the identity of a "mini movie".

At the end of the track, Harrison edited in the faint sound of a bow-played Indian string instrument, the tar shehnai. This part was taken from "Crying", an instrumental piece performed by Vinayak Vora and released on Harrison's 1968 soundtrack album Wonderwall Music. When asked about its inclusion in "Save the World", Harrison told Musician magazine in 1987: "I just wanted to let the whole song go out with something sad, to touch that nerve and maybe make you think, 'Ohhh shit.'" (Note: Harrison added, with the regard to the tar shehnai: "It's like a one-string fiddle, a bowed instrument with the sympathetic strings resting over a stretched skin, so it has that hollow, echoey resonance, a wailing, crying sound.")

After submitting Somewhere in England to Warner Bros. Records, the distributor of his Dark Horse record label, in late September 1980, Harrison was forced to rework the content of the album – including replacing four of the original songs – to ensure the release had more commercial appeal. Harrison chose to retain "Save the World" in the revised track listing and worked with Ray Cooper on a second version of the album. Although the mix for the re-submitted "Save the World" differed little from Harrison's original, Cooper was credited as a co-producer.

== Release and reception ==
Somewhere in England was released on 1 June 1981, with "Save the World" sequenced as the final track. It was the only song from Harrison's initial submission to Warner Bros. to retain its position in the running order of the official release. The album was a relative commercial success, an outcome that was due largely to a public outpouring of grief in reaction to the murder of Harrison's former bandmate John Lennon in December 1980. As a follow-up single to Harrison's tribute to Lennon, "All Those Years Ago", Warner's released "Teardrops", which was another of the album's four replacement tracks. This release took place on 20 July 1981, with "Save the World" appearing as the single's B-side.

In his album review for Creem magazine, Mitchell Cohen called Harrison a "C– thinker" and ridiculed the lyrics of "Save the World" with the comment: "Harrison comes out against paper towels (!!) (expect a rebuttal on the next Nancy Walker album) and whalemeat used as dogfood (ditto Lorne Greene)." In another unfavourable review, Harry Thomas of Rolling Stone opined that "Social commentary and ironic wit clearly remain outside the scope of Harrison's very real talents" and wrote of "Save the World": "Veering uncertainly between whimsy and dour warnings, the song ultimately fails either to galvanize or amuse." Conversely, Joel Vance of Stereo Review said it was "almost a vaudeville number" and, like "Blood from a Clone", contained "some very funny lines".

NME critic Bob Woffinden welcomed "Save the World" as an example of how the album's subject matter ranged beyond the "humdrum", and he found it "only characteristic of [Harrison] to embrace more universal themes". Record Mirror's Mike Nicholls described the lyrics as "conscience delegating" and wondered whether, given Harrison's warning of the devastation of rainforests through the demand for paper towels, the message was "Boycott bog rolls". He said the song nevertheless had "a catchy little tune" and was "cutely-constructed".

== Greenpeace version ==
Harrison revisited "Save the World" in 1985 when Greenpeace UK approached him for a contribution to an album intended to raise funds for their environmental efforts. Harrison amended the lyrics slightly to include further references to Greenpeace, along with a spoken comment that conveyed his disgust with the power of corporations: "You greedy bastards". In addition to recording a new vocal, he remixed the musical backing, giving more prominence to some of the guitar parts.

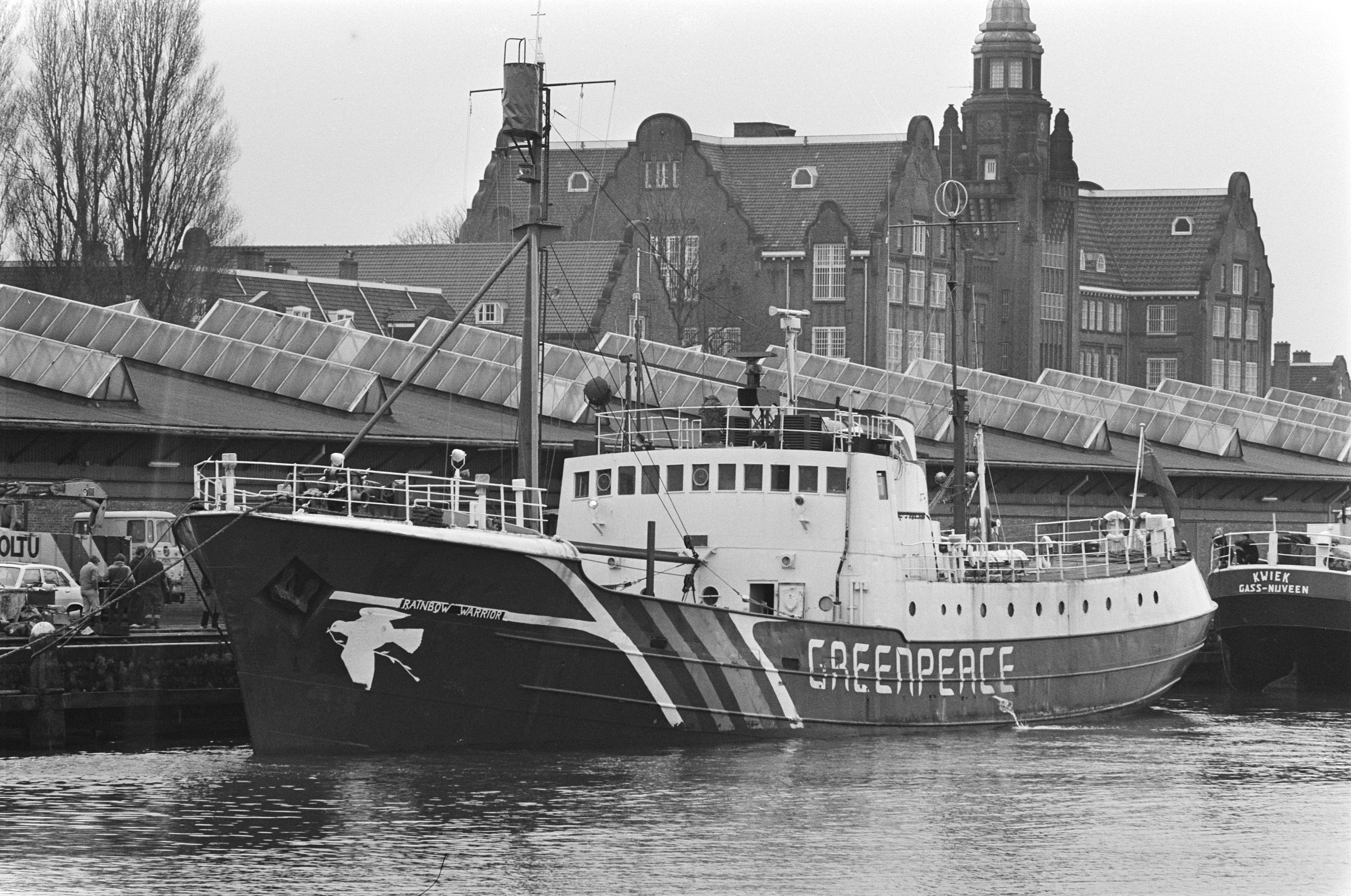
Greenpeace's Rainbow Warrior. The video clip for "Save the World" used footage of the ship and of Greenpeace's activities to protect the environment.

Titled Greenpeace – The Album, and including contributions from fifteen other British artists, the album was released in the UK by EMI on 4 June 1985. (Note: The album was issued by A&M Records in the United States, in August 1985.) The inclusion of "Save the World" on Greenpeace marked a rare new musical release for Harrison between 1983 and 1986, when he was otherwise engaged in film production with the continued success of HandMade. Over the same period, however, he became increasingly involved in environmental matters; these activities included attending an anti-nuclear demonstration in London's Trafalgar Square, voicing support for the British Green Party, and inspiring a successful campaign to stop the John Lewis Partnership from demolishing Henley's Regal Cinema and building a supermarket complex.

The song was also included in the video compilation Greenpeace: Non-Toxic Video Hits, released in December 1985, five months after the French intelligence services' sinking of the Greenpeace flagship Rainbow Warrior. Produced by Ian Weiner, the clip for "Save the World" consisted of scenes of Rainbow Warrior and Greenpeace personnel at work on their international activist campaigns.

== Retrospective assessments and legacy ==
Until his death in November 2001, Harrison continued to express alarm at the ecological issues facing the world. He dedicated his 1989 compilation album Best of Dark Horse to Greenpeace, Friends of the Earth and "anyone interested in saving our planet"; in the revised artwork for the 2001 reissue of All Things Must Pass, he included a series of images showing the gradual encroachment of pollution and industry onto the Friar Park scene depicted on that album's 1970 cover photo. As a songwriter, he revisited the themes of "Save the World" in "Cockamamie Business", a new song issued on Best of Dark Horse, and in the title track to his final studio album, the posthumously released Brainwashed. (Note: In addition, Harrison considered titling that album Your Planet Is Doomed – Volume One.)

In the 1990s, Harrison's elder sister, Louise, used "Save the World" as the soundtrack for a series of public service radio segments she produced, titled Good Earthkeeping Tips, which offered information on environmental issues. In keeping with Harrison's instructions for the reissuing of his Dark Horse catalogue, a demo of the song appeared as the sole bonus track on the 2004 reissue of Somewhere in England. Writing for Uncut in March 2017, Neil Spencer highlighted "Save the World" as one of the "[unexpected] delights" among Harrison's 1980s releases, and said that while it was dismissed as "soft protest" originally, the song is "beautifully played and never more relevant than today".

Among Harrison and Beatles biographers, Chip Madinger and Mark Easter describe "Save the World" as "a wholly unappealing track" on which the "heavyhandedness" of the lyrics is completely at odds with the musical mood. Ian Inglis echoes this view, deeming the lyrics "trite to the point of being risible" and the combination of an unfocused narrative and the overuse of sound effects to be as unsuccessful as the Beatles' work during the Magical Mystery Tour era. Although he says that the scarcity of environmental songs in the early 1980s, relative to the 1990s, might be a mitigating factor, Inglis dismisses the song as a "hopelessly vague indictment of the perils we are inflicting around the globe", adding: "The problem with such a general attack is that it lacks focus and, therefore, force."

Alan Clayson views Harrison's conservationist sentiments as "laudable" and considers the track to be a protest song in the mould of Barry McGuire's 1965 hit "Eve of Destruction", yet he also identifies the lack of subtlety as betraying "the impartiality of one long and, perhaps, guiltily isolated from the everyday". Dale Allison recognises it as "the most extensive expression of George's ecological anxiety" and a sincere statement, particularly as Harrison chose to revisit the track for the Greenpeace album. Allison calls it a "strange song", however, with a "jarring disjunction between lyric and sound", and he says that as with Harrison's other songs about pollution and environmental issues, his message reflects a romanticism that was born out of 1960s radicalism but fails to convince in the manner of Neil Young's "After the Gold Rush".

Simon Leng finds "Save the World" closer in style to Monty Python's "Eric the Half-a-Bee" than to a genuine environmental song such as "Mercy Mercy Me (The Ecology)" by Marvin Gaye. He views the Somewhere in England version as "horribly overproduced" next to the "charming" demo, which "is more Dylan than Monty Python". Thomas MacFarlane describes the song as "a curious track that arguably has the makings of a masterpiece". He recognises the production and performances as "exceptional" and credits Harrison with using "biting humor to make some rather serious points".

== Personnel ==
According to Simon Leng:

- George Harrison – vocals, electric guitars, slide guitars, synthesizer, sound effects, backing vocals
- Neil Larsen – keyboards
- Gary Brooker – synthesizer
- Tom Scott – saxophones
- Willie Weeks – bass
- Jim Keltner – drums
- Ray Cooper – percussion

== Sources ==
- Dale C. Allison Jr, The Love There That's Sleeping: The Art and Spirituality of George Harrison, Continuum (New York, NY, 2006; ISBN 978-0-8264-1917-0).
- Keith Badman, The Beatles Diary Volume 2: After the Break-Up 1970–2001, Omnibus Press (London, 2001; ISBN 0-7119-8307-0).
- Alan Clayson, George Harrison, Sanctuary (London, 2003; ISBN 1-86074-489-3).
- Peter Doggett, You Never Give Me Your Money: The Beatles After the Breakup, It Books (New York, NY, 2011; ISBN 978-0-06-177418-8).
- The Editors of Rolling Stone, Harrison, Rolling Stone Press/Simon & Schuster (New York, NY, 2002; ISBN 0-7432-3581-9).
- George Harrison (with Derek Taylor & Olivia Harrison), I, Me, Mine – The Extended Edition, Genesis Publications (Guildford, UK, 2017; ISBN 978-1-905662-40-1).
- Bill Harry, The George Harrison Encyclopedia, Virgin Books (London, 2003; ISBN 978-0753508220).
- Elliot J. Huntley, Mystical One: George Harrison – After the Break-up of the Beatles, Guernica Editions (Toronto, ON, 2006; ISBN 1-55071-197-0).
- Chris Ingham, The Rough Guide to the Beatles, Rough Guides/Penguin (London, 2006; 2nd edn; ISBN 978-1-8483-6525-4).
- Ian Inglis, The Words and Music of George Harrison, Praeger (Santa Barbara, CA, 2010; ISBN 978-0-313-37532-3).
- Colin Larkin, The Encyclopedia of Popular Music (5th edn), Omnibus Press (London, 2011; ISBN 978-0-85712-595-8).
- Simon Leng, While My Guitar Gently Weeps: The Music of George Harrison, Hal Leonard (Milwaukee, WI, 2006; ISBN 1-4234-0609-5).
- Thomas MacFarlane, The Music of George Harrison, Routledge (Abingdon, UK, 2019; ISBN 978-1-138-59910-9).
- Chip Madinger & Mark Easter, Eight Arms to Hold You: The Solo Beatles Compendium, 44.1 Productions (Chesterfield, MO, 2000; ISBN 0-615-11724-4).
- Robert Rodriguez, Fab Four FAQ 2.0: The Beatles' Solo Years, 1970–1980, Backbeat Books (Milwaukee, WI, 2010; ISBN 978-1-4165-9093-4).
- Gary Tillery, Working Class Mystic: A Spiritual Biography of George Harrison, Quest Books (Wheaton, IL, 2011; ISBN 978-0-8356-0900-5).
- Bob Woffinden, The Beatles Apart, Proteus (London, 1981; ISBN 0-906071-89-5).
