= Writing's on the Wall (George Harrison song) =

- US B-side face label

Song by George Harrison

from the album Somewhere in England
- Published: Oops/Ganga
- Released: 1 June 1981
- Genre: Raga rock
- Length: 3:59
- Label: Dark Horse
- Songwriter: George Harrison
- Producers: George Harrison, Ray Cooper

Somewhere in England track listing
- 10 tracks Side one: 1. "Blood from a Clone"; 2. "Unconsciousness Rules"; 3. "Life Itself"; 4. "All Those Years Ago"; 5. "Baltimore Oriole"; Side two: 6. "Teardrops"; 7. "That Which I Have Lost"; 8. "Writing's on the Wall"; 9. "Hong Kong Blues"; 10. "Save the World"

"Writing's on the Wall" is a song by English musician George Harrison from his 1981 album Somewhere in England. It was also the B-side of the album's lead single, "All Those Years Ago", which Harrison wrote as a tribute to his former Beatles bandmate John Lennon. In his lyrics, Harrison sings of the transient nature of life and the importance of recognising a spiritual purpose. Although the song was written long before Lennon's murder in New York in December 1980, the lyrics' reference to how easily friends can be shot down and killed led listeners to interpret it as a further comment on Lennon's death.

Harrison recorded "Writing's on the Wall" at his Friar Park studio in England in 1980. A sombre and meditative track, it includes Indian classical instrumentation alongside the Western rock backing. The musicians on the recording include Ray Cooper, who plays various percussion instruments, keyboardist Gary Brooker, and Alla Rakha on tabla.

Along with "Life Itself", "Writing's on the Wall" marked Harrison's return to philosophical songwriting after his more subtle and light-hearted work since the mid 1970s. Several music critics and commentators recognise the song as a highlight of the otherwise disappointing Somewhere in England album. Harrison agreed to its use in the 1993 audio-book format of author Deepak Chopra's Ageless Body, Timeless Mind, where the track accompanies a passage read by Chopra.

== Background and inspiration ==
Along with the Somewhere in England track "Life Itself", "Writing's on the Wall" represented a return by George Harrison to directly addressing spiritual and philosophical issues in his songwriting. In his two previous albums, Thirty Three & 1/3 (1976) and George Harrison (1979), Harrison had conveyed his spirituality in subtle terms, whereby his lyrics in praise of the Hindu deity Krishna regularly invited interpretation as standard love songs directed towards a romantic partner. This subtle approach had continued a precedent set after his 1974 North American tour with Ravi Shankar, when Harrison's spiritual pronouncements had attracted scorn from many music critics. As an additional factor by the late 1970s, Harrison had chosen to distance himself from the Hare Krishna Movement following the death of the movement's founder, A.C. Bhaktivedanta Swami Prabhupada, in November 1977.

The song's title is a phrase from the biblical Book of Daniel. While acknowledging that the phrase is commonplace in its own right, theologian Dale Allison cites Harrison's use of it as one of many examples of his acceptance of Christian teaching beside the Hindu influences with which he was more typically associated. This recognition of Christ was in keeping with a concept espoused by the late Indian yogi Paramahansa Yogananda, whose teachings had had a significant influence on Harrison since 1966.

== Composition ==
Allison describes "Writing's on the Wall" as "musically idiosyncratic". According to author Simon Leng, the song shares the same contemplative musical mood as two earlier Harrison compositions, "Be Here Now" and "Long, Long, Long", both of which carry their melody over an Indian music-style drone, recalling Harrison's period as a sitar student under Shankar in the 1960s. Leng adds that, such was Harrison's disinterest in contemporary musical genres such as disco, new wave and heavy metal, the song represented "a genus all its own".

In his lyrics, Harrison sings of the transient nature of existence and warns against relying on material things. Leng considers "Writing's on the Wall" to be the first song in which Harrison "equates music with spirituality" and explicitly evokes Nada Brahma, a concept espoused by Indian classical musicians such as Shankar that means "sound is God".

Amid his warning of life's fleeting qualities, Harrison sings of friends who are "drunk away, shot away, or die away from you". (Note: Allison writes that, for Harrison in 1980, the mention of a friend's downfall through alcohol or drugs might apply to fellow musicians such as John Lennon, Ringo Starr and Eric Clapton, without distracting from his own past excesses.) Author Ian Inglis likens the song's message, regarding the need to accept and prepare for death, to a philosophical point espoused by Argentinian author Jorge Luis Borges. Inglis writes that, like Borges in his poem "Limits", Harrison fully accepts the impermanence of life and so challenges Dylan Thomas's contention (in "Do Not Go Gentle Into That Good Night") that the inevitability of death should be defied until the end.

== Recording ==
Harrison recorded "Writing's on the Wall" during the main sessions for Somewhere in England, held at his FPSHOT studio in Oxfordshire between March and September 1980. Aside from Harrison, who also served as producer, the musicians at the sessions were Neil Larsen and Gary Brooker (both on keyboards), Ray Cooper (percussion), Willie Weeks (bass) and Jim Keltner (drums).

In July that year, Harrison was planning to produce an album by Shankar, a project that would have been their first collaboration since recording the Music Festival from India album in 1974 and their subsequent North American tour. Although the 1980 project did not take place, the song includes a rare contribution to a Western rock recording by tabla player Alla Rakha, Shankar's longtime accompanist. Harrison added other Indian instrumentation to the track, including gubgubbi, a gut-stringed instrument he had also used on the song "It Is 'He' (Jai Sri Krishna)" in 1974.

Harrison submitted Somewhere in England to Warner Bros. Records, the distributor of his Dark Horse record label, in late September 1980, with "Writing's on the Wall" sequenced as the second song, following his cover of Hoagy Carmichael's "Hong Kong Blues". Warner's were unimpressed with the album and asked Harrison to rework the content – including replacing four of the original songs – to ensure the release had more commercial appeal. Harrison chose to retain "Writing's on the Wall" over more upbeat and commercial-sounding tracks such as "Flying Hour" and "Lay His Head". The song was remixed during the additional sessions for Somewhere in England. Ray Cooper was credited as co-producer on the second version of the album.

== Release and reception ==
Somewhere in England was released on 1 June 1981. "Writing's on the Wall" appeared as the eighth track, between the newly recorded "That Which I Have Lost" and "Hong Kong Blues". The song was also issued as the B-side of the lead single, "All Those Years Ago", which Harrison wrote as a tribute to his former Beatles bandmate John Lennon, who had been fatally shot in New York City on 8 December 1980. Its inclusion on the single led many listeners to assume that "Writing's on the Wall" also addressed Lennon's murder, particularly with the line referring to friends who are unexpectedly "shot away". Author Robert Rodriguez comments that, had the scheduled release of Somewhere in England taken place in late 1980, "listeners would doubtless have been chilled by the song's prescience".

Coinciding with the public's outpouring of grief in reaction to Lennon's death, the single was a top-ten hit in many countries around the world and became Harrison's most successful single since "Give Me Love (Give Me Peace on Earth)" in 1973. Among the people he thanked on the inner sleeve of Somewhere in England was Yogananda, and he dedicated the album to Lennon's memory with a quote from Krishna in the Bhagavad Gita: "There was never a time when I did not exist, nor you. Nor will there be any future when we cease to be." (Note: One of Harrison's favourite quotes, it also appears on the artwork of his final, posthumously released, studio album, Brainwashed (2002).) The quote was followed by Lennon's initials and accompanied by both the Hindu Om symbol and a Christian cross.

Although unimpressed with Somewhere in England generally, Harry Thomas of Rolling Stone wrote: "Harrison has achieved the supreme gift of communicating, through the abstract medium of music (the words are secondary), a vision of the spiritual world he's glimpsed in his mystical explorations. Side two's "Writing's on the Wall," which makes discreet use of Indian instruments, is very nearly as gorgeous and haunting as 'Life Itself,' and a far more imaginative exercise in raga-rock than anything Harrison ever managed as a Beatle." People magazine's reviewer said that "thoughts of eternity haunt even the jauntiest of these tunes … In Writing's on the Wall, Harrison writes that 'death holds on to us much more with every passing hour.' This record is both entertainment and a musical giant's defiant tribute to the value of life." Record Mirror's Mike Nicholls paired the song with "That Which I Have Lost", saying their lyrics were "righteous homilies advocating his own God-head – one Sri Krishna, apparently", although he still found the tracks "simple yet unpatronising" and recognised a "quiet, inoffensive unpretentiousness" throughout the album.

== Retrospective assessment and legacy ==
In a gesture that Simon Leng terms "unprecedented", Harrison authorised the inclusion of "Writing's on the Wall", together with "Life Itself" and "That Which I Have Lost", on the 1993 audio release of Deepak Chopra's bestselling book Ageless Body, Timeless Mind. The track accompanies a passage read by Chopra, who became a friend of Harrison's in the mid 1980s and helped effect a reconciliation between the singer and his former meditation teacher, Maharishi Mahesh Yogi, in 1991. (Note: Since 1968, when the Beatles studied Transcendental Meditation in India with the Maharishi, Harrison had long been troubled by how he and Lennon had abruptly left their teacher and then publicly denounced him.) Having interviewed Harrison for Guitar World magazine in 1987, Rip Rense cited the song as an example of the high standard that Harrison consistently applied to his songwriting as a solo artist, such that "his work is my choice for best among the ex-Fabs for being the most substantial in melody, structure, and content."

While he considers both the 1980 and the 1981 versions of the album to be "mixed bags", former Mojo editor Mat Snow pairs "the gentle, thoughtful 'Writing's on the Wall'" with "Life Itself", as the two tracks that "stand out as deeply felt returns to singing of his spirituality". Leng recognises the same pair of songs as "about the only reason to look into the 1981 Somewhere in England", with "Writing's on the Wall" representing "the ultimate expression of [Harrison's] introverted music in an extroverted age". In his comments on the media attention afforded Harrison after his near-fatal stabbing in December 1999, Leng also remarks on the irony that the issues Harrison had addressed in songs such as "Writing's on the Wall" "were played out before his eyes, with himself as the leading man".

Ian Inglis admires the synergistic aspect of the song's music and lyrics, a quality that he finds lacking in other tracks on Harrison's most artistically compromised album. Inglis adds that the "poetic properties of his lyrics are seen here at their best" and reflect Harrison's continued ability to "use language in expressive ways". Author Elliot Huntley describes the track as "pleasant" but seemingly "unfinished", and suggests that it would have been better served with a full Indian classical arrangement in the style of Harrison's Beatles composition "Within You Without You".

== Personnel ==
According to Simon Leng:

- George Harrison – vocals, electric guitars, gubgubbi, backing vocals
- Neil Larsen – keyboards
- Gary Brooker – synthesizer
- Willie Weeks – bass
- Jim Keltner – drums
- Ray Cooper – percussion, congas
- Alla Rakha – tabla

== Sources ==
- Dale C. Allison Jr., The Love There That's Sleeping: The Art and Spirituality of George Harrison, Continuum (New York, NY, 2006; ISBN 978-0-8264-1917-0).
- Keith Badman, The Beatles Diary Volume 2: After the Break-Up 1970–2001, Omnibus Press (London, 2001; ISBN 0-7119-8307-0).
- Alan Clayson, George Harrison, Sanctuary (London, 2003; ISBN 1-86074-489-3).
- Peter Doggett, You Never Give Me Your Money: The Beatles After the Breakup, It Books (New York, NY, 2011; ISBN 978-0-06-177418-8).
- The Editors of Rolling Stone, Harrison, Rolling Stone Press/Simon & Schuster (New York, NY, 2002; ISBN 0-7432-3581-9).
- Bill Harry, The George Harrison Encyclopedia, Virgin Books (London, 2003; ISBN 978-0753508220).
- Elliot J. Huntley, Mystical One: George Harrison – After the Break-up of the Beatles, Guernica Editions (Toronto, ON, 2006; ISBN 1-55071-197-0).
- Ian Inglis, The Words and Music of George Harrison, Praeger (Santa Barbara, CA, 2010; ISBN 978-0-313-37532-3).
- Peter Lavezzoli, The Dawn of Indian Music in the West, Continuum (New York, NY, 2006; ISBN 0-8264-2819-3).
- Simon Leng, While My Guitar Gently Weeps: The Music of George Harrison, Hal Leonard (Milwaukee, WI, 2006; ISBN 1-4234-0609-5).
- Chip Madinger & Mark Easter, Eight Arms to Hold You: The Solo Beatles Compendium, 44.1 Productions (Chesterfield, MO, 2000; ISBN 0-615-11724-4).
- Robert Rodriguez, Fab Four FAQ 2.0: The Beatles' Solo Years, 1970–1980, Backbeat Books (Milwaukee, WI, 2010; ISBN 978-1-4165-9093-4).
- Nicholas Schaffner, The Beatles Forever, McGraw-Hill (New York, NY, 1978; ISBN 0-07-055087-5).
- Ravi Shankar, Raga Mala: The Autobiography of Ravi Shankar, Welcome Rain (New York, NY, 1999; ISBN 1-56649-104-5).
- Mat Snow, The Beatles Solo: The Illustrated Chronicles of John, Paul, George, and Ringo After The Beatles (Volume 3: George), Race Point Publishing (New York, NY, 2013; ISBN 978-1-937994-26-6).
- Gary Tillery, Working Class Mystic: A Spiritual Biography of George Harrison, Quest Books (Wheaton, IL, 2011; ISBN 978-0-8356-0900-5).
- Bob Woffinden, The Beatles Apart, Proteus (London, 1981; ISBN 0-906071-89-5).
