= Blood from a Clone =

Song by George Harrison

from the album Somewhere in England
- Released: 1 June 1981
- Recorded: November 1980—February 1981
- Studio: FPSHOT (Oxfordshire)
- Genre: Ska
- Length: 4:03
- Label: Dark Horse
- Songwriter: George Harrison
- Producers: George Harrison; Ray Cooper

Somewhere in England track listing
- 10 tracks Side one: 1. "Blood from a Clone"; 2. "Unconsciousness Rules"; 3. "Life Itself"; 4. "All Those Years Ago"; 5. "Baltimore Oriole"; Side two: 6. "Teardrops"; 7. "That Which I Have Lost"; 8. "Writing's on the Wall"; 9. "Hong Kong Blues"; 10. "Save the World"

Licensed audio
- "Blood from a Clone" on YouTube

"Blood from a Clone" is a song by the English musician and former Beatles guitarist George Harrison from his ninth studio album Somewhere in England (1981). The song saw a re-release on The Dark Horse Years 1976–1992 (2004).

== Background ==
In 1980, Harrison had finished recording the original track listing for Somewhere in England and was ready to present it to Warner Bros. Records. Executive Mo Ostin rejected his original version of the album, because the label thought none of the songs were radio ready, which made Harrison upset, so he decided to write the song after the occasion. Harrison's original plan was to write songs that were aimed at "14-20-year-olds", but he had to write another song.

== Critical reception ==
Elliot J. Huntley said that "Blood from a Clone", "That Which I Have Lost", "Teardrops" and "All Those Years Ago" were "certainly more commercial but were also more throwaway and unbalanced than Harrison's original vision of the album". AllMusic's Lindsay Planer called it a "biting satire that relates the difficulty the former Beatle was concurrently having with his record company" and goes on to state that it "became one of the submitted alternates. The lyrics that accompany the bopping and otherwise affable midtempo melody were nothing short of a stab at the age-old 'artist versus suits' dilemma". Author Peter Doggett called it "an assault on the shortsightedness of record executives". Author Andrew Jackson Grant called it "bitter". Authors Chip Madinger and Mark Easter notes that it "had fairly witty lyrics slamming the industry that forces him to amend his art, tied to a snappy, yet somewhat awkward backing track"

== Personnel ==
According to author Simon Leng

- George Harrison – vocals, guitar
- Herbie Flowers – bass guitar
- Dave Mattacks – drums, percussion
- Mike Moran – keyboards

== Sources ==
- Alan Clayson, George Harrison, Sanctuary (London, 2003; ISBN 1-86074-489-3).
- Peter Doggett, You Never Give Me Your Money: The Beatles After the Breakup, It Books (New York City, New York, 2011; ISBN 978-0-06-177418-8).
- Elliot J. Huntley, Mystical One: George Harrison – After the Break-up of the Beatles, Guernica Editions (Toronto, Ontario, 2006; ISBN 1-55071-197-0).
- Ian Inglis, The Words and Music of George Harrison, Praeger Publishing (Santa Barbara, California, 2010; ISBN 978-0-313-37532-3).
- Andrew Grant Jackson, Still the Greatest: The Essential Solo Beatles Songs, Scarecrow Press (Lanham, Maryland, 2012; ISBN 978-0-8108-8222-5).
- Simon Leng, While My Guitar Gently Weeps: The Music of George Harrison, Hal Leonard (Milwaukee, Wisconsin, 2006; ISBN 1-4234-0609-5).
- Chip Madinger & Mark Easter, Eight Arms to Hold You: The Solo Beatles Compendium, 44.1 Productions (Chesterfield, MO, 2000; ISBN 0-615-11724-4).
