= All Those Years Ago =

- UK picture sleeve

Single by George Harrison

from the album Somewhere in England
- B-side: "Writing's on the Wall"
- Released: 11 May 1981
- Recorded: 19–25 November 1980; 6 February 1981
- Studio: FPSHOT, Henley-on-Thames
- Genre: Pop rock; soft rock; blues rock; pop soul
- Length: 3:42
- Label: Dark Horse
- Songwriter: George Harrison
- Producers: George Harrison, Ray Cooper

George Harrison singles chronology
"Faster" (1979)	"All Those Years Ago" (1981)	"Teardrops" (1981)

Somewhere in England track listing
- 10 tracks Side one: 1. "Blood from a Clone"; 2. "Unconsciousness Rules"; 3. "Life Itself"; 4. "All Those Years Ago"; 5. "Baltimore Oriole"; Side two: 6. "Teardrops"; 7. "That Which I Have Lost"; 8. "Writing's on the Wall"; 9. "Hong Kong Blues"; 10. "Save the World"

"All Those Years Ago" is a song by the English rock musician George Harrison, released in May 1981 as a single from his ninth studio album Somewhere in England. Having previously recorded the music for the song, Harrison tailored the lyrics to serve as a personal tribute to his former Beatles bandmate John Lennon, following the latter's murder in 1980. Ringo Starr played drums, and Paul McCartney (along with his Wings bandmates Linda McCartney and Denny Laine) overdubbed backing vocals onto the basic track. The single spent three weeks at number 2 on the US Billboard Hot 100, behind "Bette Davis Eyes" by Kim Carnes, and it peaked at number 13 on the UK Singles Chart. It also topped Canada's RPM singles chart and spent one week at number 1 on Billboard's Adult Contemporary listings.

"All Those Years Ago" was the first recording on which Harrison, McCartney and Starr all appeared since the Beatles' "I Me Mine" (1970), and their last recording together until "Free as a Bird" (1995). Other musicians performing on the track include Al Kooper and Ray Cooper. The song has appeared on the Harrison compilations Best of Dark Horse 1976–1989 and Let It Roll, and a live version recorded in 1991 with Eric Clapton was included on Harrison's Live in Japan double album.

== Origins ==
Prior to Lennon's death, Harrison originally wrote the song with different lyrics for Ringo Starr to record. Although he recorded it, Starr felt the vocal was too high for his range and disliked the lyrics. Harrison took the track back and, after Lennon's death, the lyrics were changed to reflect a tribute to him. In the song, Harrison makes reference to the Lennon-penned Beatles song "All You Need Is Love" and the Lennon song "Imagine" ("you were the one who Imagined it all").

== Band line-up ==
The recording of the song featured all three remaining Beatles (Harrison, Starr and Paul McCartney), though this was expressly a Harrison single. It is one of only a few non-Beatles songs to feature three members of the band. Harrison and Starr recorded the song at Harrison's Friar Park studio between 19 November and 25 November 1980. The lineup was rounded out by Al Kooper on keyboards, Herbie Flowers on bass and percussionist Ray Cooper. Harrison co-produced the recording with Cooper.

After Lennon's death the following month, Harrison removed Starr's vocals (but kept Starr's drumming track) and recorded his own vocals with rewritten lyrics honouring Lennon. McCartney, his wife Linda and their Wings bandmate Denny Laine visited Friar Park and recorded backing vocals as an overdub to the original track. The album's liner notes also thank the Beatles' former producer George Martin and engineer Geoff Emerick, who were present at the session where the backing vocals were recorded. Martin, Emerick and the members of Wings were working on McCartney's Tug of War album at the time, and had traveled to Harrison's studio to record a Harrison guitar overdub for that album. The session instead turned into a vocal session for "All Those Years Ago", and Harrison's guitar piece for McCartney's album was never recorded.

== Critical reception ==
Record World described the song as a "buoyant reminiscence [that] features George's fluid guitar lines with help from Paul, Ringo and Linda."

== Music video ==
The music video features a slide show-type presentation of stills and short archival video clips. The emphasis is on Lennon and, to a lesser degree, Harrison. The post-Beatles stills of Lennon at older ages are countered with stills of Harrison from the same time frame.

== Personnel ==
- George Harrison – lead vocals, electric guitars, synthesizer, backing vocals
- Al Kooper – electric piano
- Herbie Flowers – bass
- Ringo Starr – drums
- Ray Cooper – tambourine
- Paul McCartney – backing vocals
- Linda McCartney – backing vocals
- Denny Laine – backing vocals

== Chart performance ==
=== Weekly charts ===
Chart (1981)	Peak position
Australian Kent Music Report	9
Austrian Singles Chart	14
Belgian Ultratop Singles Chart	38
Canadian RPM Top Singles	1
Dutch MegaChart Singles	43
Irish Singles Chart	4
Italy (FIMI)	20
New Zealand Singles Chart	14
Norwegian VG-lista Singles	2
Swiss Singles Chart	8
Swedish Singles Chart	11
UK Singles Chart	13
US Billboard Adult Contemporary	1
US Billboard Hot 100	2
US Billboard Mainstream Rock	6
US Cash Box Top 100	3
West German Media Control Singles	44

=== Year-end charts ===
Chart (1981)	Rank
Australia (Kent Music Report)	73
Canadian RPM Singles	30
Italy (FIMI)	67
US Billboard Hot 100	74
US Cash Box	38

== See also ==
- List of Billboard Adult Contemporary number ones of 1981
- "Here Today", Paul McCartney's 1982 tribute song to Lennon
