= Jimmy Page by Jimmy Page =

2010 autobiography by Jimmy Page

- Cover
- Author: Jimmy Page
- Language: English
- Genre: Autobiography
- Publisher: Genesis Publications (England)
- Publication date: September 2010
- Publication place: United States
- Media type: Print (hardcover)
- ISBN: 978-1-905662-17-3

Jimmy Page by Jimmy Page is a coffee table autobiography written by Led Zeppelin guitarist Jimmy Page. It was published by Genesis Publications in September 2010.

The book includes rare photos, selected by Page, along with handwritten captions describing the subjects in the images. The book is described as "a career in pictures". The selection of photos is meant to represent Page's musical career. The book was updated and re-released in 2014 to catch up on what happened since 2010.

== Background ==
At the time of publication the author was 66 years old. Only 2,500 copies of the book were published during its first run. All of these are personally signed by the author. The book is 512 pages, with more than 700 images printed on fine art paper.
