= Life Itself =

Life Itself may refer to:

== Films ==
- Life Itself (2014 film), a documentary, film adaptation of film critic Roger Ebert's memoir
- Life Itself (2018 film), an English-language romance drama film

== Songs ==
- "Life Itself" (George Harrison song), a song by George Harrison from Somewhere in England
- "Life Itself", a song by Glass Animals from How to Be a Human Being
- "Life Itself", a song by Bruce Springsteen from Working on a Dream

== Books ==
- Life Itself: A Memoir, a 2011 memoir by film critic Roger Ebert
- Life Itself: Its Origin and Nature, a 1981 book by Francis Crick
- Life Itself: A Comprehensive Inquiry Into the Nature, Origin, and Fabrication of Life, a 1991 book by Robert Rosen

== Other ==
- Life Itself with Sanjay Gupta and Marc Hodosh, a health conference
- "Life, Itself", a Star Trek: Discovery season 5 episode
