= Somewhere in England =

Studio album by George Harrison
- Released: 1 June 1981
- Recorded: March–September 1980, November 1980 – February 1981
- Studio: FPSHOT (Oxfordshire)
- Genre: Rock
- Length: 39:43
- Label: Dark Horse
- Producers: George Harrison; Ray Cooper

George Harrison chronology
George Harrison (1979)	Somewhere in England (1981)	Gone Troppo (1982)

Alternative cover
- 2004 reissue cover, rejected by Warner Bros. in 1980

Singles from Somewhere in England
- 1. "All Those Years Ago" Released: 11 May 1981; 2. "Teardrops" Released: 15 July 1981

Somewhere in England is the ninth studio album by English musician George Harrison, released on 1 June 1981 by Dark Horse Records. The album was recorded during a period in which Harrison was becoming increasingly frustrated with the music industry. Its production was lengthy and marked by conflicts with Warner Bros. Records.

Somewhere in England was Harrison's first album released after the murder of John Lennon, his former bandmate in the Beatles. The lyrics of the album's lead single, "All Those Years Ago", serve as a tribute to Lennon.

== Recording ==
Harrison began recording Somewhere in England in March 1980 and continued sporadically, finally delivering the album to Warner Bros. Records, the distributor of his Dark Horse record label, in late September that year. However, the executives at Warner Bros. rejected the album, feeling it was "too laid back" and not sufficiently commercial. Harrison agreed to rework the album and to record new material. Harrison's original cover art, featuring his profile against a map of Great Britain, was also vetoed by Warner Bros.

Returning to the project in November, Harrison was joined in his FPSHOT studio in Henley-on-Thames by Ringo Starr, who arrived specifically to have Harrison produce some songs for him. They recorded two Harrison originals – "Wrack My Brain" and "All Those Years Ago" – plus a cover version of Paul Weston's "You Belong to Me" for Starr's eighth studio album Can't Fight Lightning (later released as Stop and Smell the Roses). The two other songs were completed but "All Those Years Ago" was left unfinished. Starr later admitted that the key was too high for him to sing.

On 8 December 1980, John Lennon was shot dead outside his apartment building, the Dakota. After the shock and devastation of Lennon's murder, Harrison decided to utilise the unfinished recording of "All Those Years Ago". He changed the lyrics of the song to reflect the Lennon tragedy. With Starr's pre-recorded drum track in place, Harrison invited Paul and Linda McCartney, and their Wings bandmate Denny Laine, to record backing vocals in early 1981.

Along with "All Those Years Ago", three more songs were added to the album: "Blood from a Clone" (a criticism of the WB executives who had rejected his original album), "Teardrops" and "That Which I Have Lost". To make room for the new songs, Harrison elected to drop four tracks from the original line-up: "Tears of the World", "Sat Singing", "Lay His Head" and "Flying Hour". A new cover was then shot in the Tate Gallery in London, and Somewhere in England was resubmitted and accepted.

== Release and critical reception ==
Professional ratings
Review scores
Source	Rating
AllMusic	3.5/5 stars
Elsewhere	2/5 stars
The Encyclopedia of Popular Music	3/5 stars
Goldmine	(favourable)
Mojo	3/5 stars
The Music Box	3.5/5 stars
Music Story	3/5 stars
Rolling Stone	2/5 stars
Uncut	2/5 stars
The Village Voice	C−

"All Those Years Ago" was released as the lead single in May 1981 to a strong response, reaching number 13 in the United Kingdom and number 2 in the United States. It was Harrison's biggest hit since "Give Me Love (Give Me Peace on Earth)" in 1973, and Somewhere in England benefited from the song's popularity. The album was released on June 1 in the US and June 5 in the UK. It peaked at number 11 in the US, and at number 13 in the UK, giving the artist his highest-charting album there since 1973.

Somewhere in England's chart run was relatively brief in America, however, and it became Harrison's first album since the Beatles' break-up not to reach gold status there. The second single, "Teardrops", peaked at only number 102 on Billboard's singles listings.

Reviewing the album favourably in 1981, People magazine called it one of Harrison's best and highlighted the "moving" tribute to Lennon. Robert Christgau was less receptive in The Village Voice, dismissing the songs as "sappy plaints". He applauded "All Those Years Ago" as Harrison's "catchiest tune in years", however, although he said that Lennon had yet to comment from the grave on the album sleeve's Krishna-esque message of eternal life.

== Aftermath and later releases ==
"Lay His Head" was first issued in October 1987 as the B-side of Harrison's "Got My Mind Set on You" single. The song was remixed for this release. All four songs omitted from the 1981 Somewhere in England were then included on the EPs accompanying the Genesis Publications books Songs by George Harrison and Songs by George Harrison 2. These two titles were available only in deluxe limited editions, published in 1988 and 1992, respectively.

In 2004, Somewhere in England was remastered and reissued, both separately and as part of the box set The Dark Horse Years 1976–1992, on Dark Horse Records with new distribution by EMI. The reissue included the original mix of "Unconsciousness Rules" and, as a bonus track, Harrison's demo of "Save the World", recorded in early 1980. In addition, the rejected artwork was reinstated, replacing that used for the 1981 release. An alternative mix of "Tears of the World" from that submitted in 1980 was included as a bonus track on the Dark Horse Years reissue of Harrison's seventh studio album Thirty Three & 1/3 (1976).

The iTunes Store's digital version of Somewhere in England includes "Flying Hour" as a second bonus track. Rather than the rendition that Harrison had intended for release in 1980, it is the version that appeared on the Songs by George Harrison EP. With a running time of 4:35, this slower version begins with a studio count-in, is longer, lacks and adds guitar riffs, fades slightly at the end, and plays at the correct speed.

In 2006, a survey was conducted on the GeorgeHarrison.com message boards to find the artist's 50 most popular songs. The results featured only one track from the album: "Life Itself", at number 29. The same survey included three of the four rejected songs: "Flying Hour", at number 14; "Lay His Head", number 27; and "Sat Singing", number 41.

== Track listing ==
=== Official release ===
All songs composed by George Harrison, except where noted.

Side one

1. "Blood from a Clone" – 4:03
2. "Unconsciousness Rules" – 3:05
3. "Life Itself" – 4:25
4. "All Those Years Ago" – 3:45
5. "Baltimore Oriole" (Hoagy Carmichael, Paul Francis Webster) – 3:57

Side two

1. "Teardrops" – 4:09
2. "That Which I Have Lost" – 3:47
3. "Writing's on the Wall" – 3:59
4. "Hong Kong Blues" (Carmichael) – 2:55
5. "Save the World" – 4:54

2004 reissue bonus track

11. "Save the World" (demo version) – 4:31

iTunes-edition bonus track

12. "Flying Hour" (Harrison, Mick Ralphs) – 4:35

=== Original (rejected) track listing ===
1. "Hong Kong Blues" (Carmichael) – 2:53
2. "Writing's on the Wall" – 3:58
3. "Flying Hour" (Harrison, Mick Ralphs) – 4:04
4. "Lay His Head" – 3:43
5. "Unconsciousness Rules" – 3:36
6. "Sat Singing" – 4:28
7. "Life Itself" – 4:24
8. "Tears of the World" – 4:00
9. "Baltimore Oriole" (Carmichael) – 3:57
10. "Save the World" – 4:56

== Personnel ==
Musicians

- George Harrison – lead and backing vocals, electric and acoustic guitar, keyboards, synthesiser, gubguba
- Willie Weeks – bass guitar
- Herbie Flowers – tuba, bass guitar
- Neil Larsen – keyboards, synthesiser
- Al Kooper – keyboards, synthesiser
- Mike Moran – keyboards, synthesiser (6)
- Gary Brooker – keyboards, synthesiser (8)
- Ray Cooper – keyboards, synthesiser, percussion, drums
- Jim Keltner – drums
- Ringo Starr – drums (4)
- Dave Mattacks – drums (6)
- Alla Rakha – tabla
- Tom Scott – Lyricon, horns
- Paul McCartney, Linda McCartney, Denny Laine – backing vocals (4)

== Charts ==
=== Weekly charts ===
Chart (1981)	Peak position
Australia (Kent Music Report)	17
Austrian Albums	15
Canadian 50 Albums (RPM)	14
Dutch Albums (MegaCharts)	42
Japanese LPs (Oricon)	31
New Zealand Albums (RIANZ)	40
Norwegian Albums (VG-lista)	2
Swedish Albums (Sverigetopplistan)	13
UK Albums	13
US Billboard 200	11
US Cash Box Top 200 Albums	11
West German Albums (Media Control)	36

=== Year-end charts ===
Chart (1981)	Position
Australian Albums Chart	98
Canadian RPM Albums	80

== Sources ==
- Badman, Keith (2001), The Beatles Diary Volume 2: After the Break-Up 1970–2001, London: Omnibus Press, ISBN 0-7119-8307-0.
- Christgau, Robert (4 August 1981), "Consumer Guide", The Village Voice.
- Harris, John (November 2011), "Beware of Darkness", Mojo.
- Kent, David (1993), Australian Chart Book 1970–1992, St Ives, NSW: Australian Chart Book, ISBN 0-646-11917-6.
- Larkin, Colin (2011), The Encyclopedia of Popular Music (5th ed.), London: Omnibus Press, ISBN 978-0-85712-595-8.
- Leng, Simon (2006), While My Guitar Gently Weeps: The Music of George Harrison, Milwaukee, WI: Hal Leonard, ISBN 1-4234-0609-5.
- Madinger, Chip; Easter, Mark (2000), Eight Arms to Hold You: The Solo Beatles Compendium, Chesterfield, MO: 44.1 Productions, ISBN 0-615-11724-4.
- {{citation |last=Metzger |first=John "George Harrison The Dark Horse Years (Part Three: Somewhere in England)" Archived 23 November 2016 at the Wayback Machine, The Music Box, vol. 11 (5), May 2004 (retrieved 14 August 2014).
- Oricon Album Chart Book: Complete Edition 1970–2005, Roppongi, Tokyo: Oricon Entertainment, 2006, ISBN 4-87131-077-9.
- Thomas, Harry (6 August 1981), "George Harrison: Somewhere in England", Rolling Stone.
- Williamson, Nigel (February 2002), "All Things Must Pass: George Harrison's post-Beatles solo albums", Uncut.
