= Hawks (film) =

1988 film by Robert Ellis Miller

- VHS cover
- Directed by: Robert Ellis Miller
- Written by: Roy Clarke
- Story by: Barry Gibb; David English
- Produced by: Steve Lanning; Keith Cavele
- Starring: Timothy Dalton; Anthony Edwards; Janet McTeer; Camille Coduri; Geoffrey Palmer
- Music by: Barry Gibb; John Cameron
- Production company: Pinewood Studios
- Distributed by: Rank Film Distributors
- Release dates: August 5, 1988 (UK); November 10, 1989 (United States)
- Country: United Kingdom
- Language: English

Hawks is a 1988 British comedy drama film directed by Robert Ellis Miller and based on a short story written by Barry Gibb of the Bee Gees and David English. The musical score was composed by Gibb.

The plot follows two terminally ill patients, an English lawyer named Bancroft (Timothy Dalton) and young American ex-football player Deckermensky (Anthony Edwards), who decide to sneak out of their hospital rooms and live life to its fullest for whatever time they have left. The film’s screenplay was written by Roy Clarke.

== Premise ==
Bancroft and Deckermensky are two terminally ill cancer patients who sneak out of the hospital for a series of adventures, their main goal being to reach a famed brothel in Amsterdam. In a stolen ambulance, they make their way to Holland. Along the way, the duo stop over at a wedding, where Bancroft’s former flame who abandoned him when he became ill is a bridesmaid. They also encounter various characters, including a pair of misfit British women, Hazel and Maureen. Though Maureen and Decker hit it off, Bancroft sees the women—who are unaware of the men’s terminal condition—as a distraction from his quest with Decker.

== Cast ==
- Timothy Dalton as Bancroft
- Anthony Edwards as Deckermensky a.k.a. "Decker"
- Janet McTeer as Hazel
- Camille Coduri as Maureen
- Jill Bennett as Vivian Bancroft
- Robert Lang as Walter Bancroft
- Bruce Boa as Byron Deckermensky
- Pat Starr as Millie Deckermensky
- Sheila Hancock as Regina
- Geoffrey Palmer as SAAB Salesman
- Caroline Langrishe as Carol
- Benjamin Whitrow as Mr. Granger
- Connie Booth as Nurse Jarvis
- Julie T. Wallace as Ward Sister

== Production ==
Hawks was filmed on location in London's Charing Cross Hospital and in the Netherlands.

The film is rated R16 in New Zealand for nudity, sexual references and offensive language.

Dalton was moved by the impact it made on viewers: "...I was overwhelmed with letters by cancer victims and the husbands, wives, and children of cancer victims who were just saying, 'Thank you so much.' "

== See also ==
- Knockin' on Heaven's Door, a 1997 film with a similar plot
- The Bucket List, a 2007 film with a similar plot
