= Ride Rajbun =

Song by George Harrison

from the album The Bunbury Tails
- Released: 5 October 1992
- Recorded: March 1988; FPSHOT, Oxfordshire; unknown studio, London
- Genre: Indian music, children's song
- Length: 4:59
- Label: Polydor
- Songwriters: George Harrison, David English
- Producer: George Harrison

"Ride Rajbun" is a song by English musician George Harrison. It was released in 1992 on the multi-artist charity album The Bunbury Tails, which was the soundtrack to the British animated television series of the same name. Harrison co-wrote the song's lyrics with Bunbury Tails creator David English. The eponymous Rajbun was a character in the series based on English's friend and cricketer Rajendrasinh Jadeja, one of a team of cricket-playing rabbits – in this case, from Bangalore in India. The composition is in the style of a nursery rhyme or children's song, while the all-Indian instrumentation on the recording recalls some of Harrison's compositions for the Beatles during 1966–68.

Harrison recorded "Ride Rajbun" in March 1988, between the release of his successful comeback album, Cloud Nine, and his formation of the Traveling Wilburys. Harrison's nine-year-old son Dhani and English accompanied him on the recording, as fellow vocalists, and Indian musician and composer Ravi Shankar provided the opening sitar part. The song appeared in the Bunbury Tails episode "Rajbun Story", and on the soundtrack album alongside contributions from Elton John, the Bee Gees and Eric Clapton. Issued briefly in only the UK, "Ride Rajbun" remains one of Harrison's rarest releases.

== Background ==
Whilst playing cricket with George one day at Friar Park a couple of years ago, I told him about my Bunburys, as he had his Wilburys. I suggested that he might like to write a song for the cartoon series, which had been directed by Bob Godfrey, who was involved in [the Beatles' animated film] Yellow Submarine.

– David English

Having previously been averse to most team sports, George Harrison came to appreciate cricket while recording his 1987 comeback album, Cloud Nine, with fellow musicians Jeff Lynne and Elton John, both fans of the game. Author Ian Inglis suggests that Harrison's involvement in The Bunbury Tails – a children's animated TV series about a group of heroic, sports-playing rabbits – partly resulted from his friendship with Eric Clapton, another cricket fan and an occasional player for the Bunbury Cricket Club. The latter was a charity-fundraising team founded in 1986 by writer and former RSO Records executive David English, whose Bunbury Tails cartoon books inspired the TV show. According to English, he suggested to Harrison that he contribute a song to the series while they were playing cricket in the grounds of Friar Park, Harrison's home in Henley-on-Thames, Oxfordshire. English says he likened the "Bunburys" to Harrison's idea for a semi-fictional band, the Traveling Wilburys, which Harrison would soon form with Lynne, Bob Dylan, Tom Petty and Roy Orbison.

Financed by the Bee Gees, production on The Bunburys Tails began in early 1988, although it would not air on British television until 1992. The series was directed by Bob Godfrey, who had worked on the Beatles' 1968 animated film Yellow Submarine. Harrison's participation followed his work on various film soundtracks, particularly for releases by his company HandMade Films, during the five years preceding his return with Cloud Nine. (Note: These soundtrack projects included Water (1985), Porky's Revenge! (1985) and Shanghai Surprise (1986). In addition, Harrison had supplied the soundtrack to HandMade's Time Bandits (1981) and would provide a song, "Cheer Down", for the 1989 film Lethal Weapon 2.) The Bee Gees, Clapton and John were among the other artists who contributed to the Bunbury Tails soundtrack.

Harrison wrote the song "Ride Rajbun" about one of the show's characters, Rajbun, a rabbit who originated from the Indian city of Bangalore. In English's recollection, the night after he had made the request, Harrison called him at home in London and played the tune down the phone. The pair met the next day and co-wrote the song's lyrics.

== Composition ==
Musically, "Ride Rajbun" is in the style of what author Alan Clayson calls "George's Indo-pop productions" for the Beatles, "Love You To" and "The Inner Light", released in 1966 and 1968 respectively. The lyrics take the form of a traditional children's song, author Simon Leng writes, with its refrain sung in rounds, similar to "London's Burning".

In a chorus that Inglis terms "nursery-rhyme-like", Harrison urges Rajbun to cycle away from his home in India and embrace his destiny:

Ride Rajbun, ride Rajbun
Seek your fame and speak your fortune
Go on, Rajbun, ride your Ellie
Cross the mountains, through the valleys.

Inglis draws parallels between Rajbun's journey of discovery and that of nursery-rhyme or folk-tale characters Pinocchio, Dick Whittington and Dorothy Gale, in that he "has a 'quest' that awaits him". On this journey, Harrison sings of Rajbun's adversaries, one of which warns him: "You may think that you have heard the last of Katman / … I'll be watching you 'round ev'ry bend you'll take …" Inglis writes that Rajbun must face his quest "without 'fears' or 'tears'" and cites the verse-one lines "Bunbury stands for freedom / Being young and having fun" as evidence of the song's "overwhelmingly positive" message.

== Recording ==
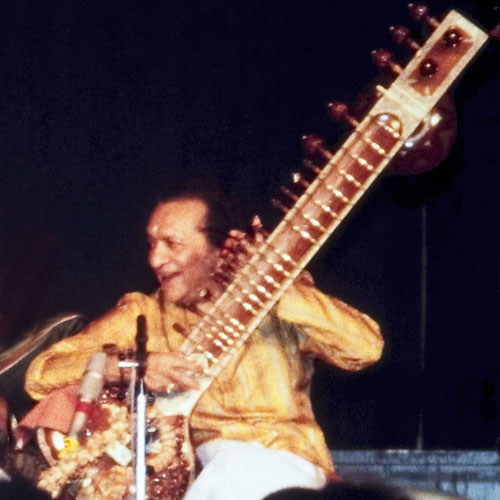
Ravi Shankar (pictured in 1988) performed the song's sitar introduction.

Harrison recorded "Ride Rajbun" in late March 1988, at his Friar Park studio, FPSHOT, and at an unnamed studio in London. The song was his first to feature only Indian instrumentation since "The Inner Light", recorded in Bombay in January 1968. The sitar introduction to "Ride Rabjan" – or alap, in the Indian classical tradition – was performed by Ravi Shankar. According to English, Harrison visited Shankar at the London hotel where the sitarist was staying and taped Shankar's intro in his hotel room. Harrison otherwise played all the sitar parts on the song. As with Harrison's appearance on "Friar Park", a track on Shankar's album Tana Mana (1987), "Ride Rajbun" marked a rare collaboration between the two musicians in the years since their joint North American tour at the end of 1974. (Note: While their formal musical collaboration would not resume until Harrison began compiling the Ravi Shankar: In Celebration box set (1996), he and Shankar, together with tabla player Alla Rakha, also recorded the unreleased song "Dhani'", shortly after the birth of Harrison's son in August 1978.)

Harrison sung the choruses with his son Dhani, and English (in the role of Katman) provided what Leng calls a "cameo vocal" part. According to author Bill Harry, Ray Cooper played percussion on the track; in English's description, all the other contributors were "top Indian musicians", none of whom are credited by name. Besides sitar, the Indian instruments on the recording include tabla, shehnai and bansuri (flute). From writing the song to the finished recording, work on "Ride Rajbun" lasted for four days. Harrison then left for Los Angeles, a trip that resulted in the formation of the Traveling Wilburys.

== Release and reception ==
"Ride Rajbun" appeared in the Bunbury Tails episode "Rajbun Story". After the show's broadcast in 1992, on Britain's Channel 4 network, Polydor Records included the song on its soundtrack album from the series. The UK-only album was released on 5 October that year, on the same day that Harrison joined guitarist Gary Moore on stage at London's Royal Albert Hall. While Harrison made a number of concert appearances throughout 1992, this period marked the end of his successful return to full-time music-making, after Cloud Nine and two albums with the Traveling Wilburys. Although he would continue to record privately as a solo artist, "Ride Rajbun" was the last new Harrison song to be commercially released until "Horse to the Water" in 2001. (Note: "Horse to the Water" was issued ten days before Harrison's death in November 2001, on Jools Holland's Small World, Big Band album. A number of Harrison's recordings from the 1990s appeared on his posthumously released album Brainwashed (2002).) Proceeds from the Bunbury Tails album went to the Bunbury Cricket Club for dispersal to charity.

The "Rajbun Story" episode was included on the home video of the series, although a narrator's voice renders Harrison's song almost inaudible. With the album and video only available in the UK for a short time, "Ride Rajbun" has become one of Harrison's rarest recordings. The song has since appeared on bootleg compilations such as Artifacts III.

Among Harrison's biographers, Elliot Huntley views "Ride Rajbun" as "another truly great 'lost' Harrison gem" alongside tracks released privately on the two Songs by George Harrison discs, in 1988 and 1992. Huntley laments the unavailability of "Ride Rajbun", since "the song is excellent, with a delightful melody, earnest vocals, and some great sitar work by Ravi Shankar". Simon Leng similarly admires Shankar's "characteristically precious" alap; Leng writes that while the song "will never be regarded as a Harrison classic", it is significant within the artist's work as the first "purely Indian piece issued under his name since 'The Inner Light'". Ian Inglis notes the precedents set in the 1960s by Beatle songs such as "Yellow Submarine" and "Cry Baby Cry", which had reflected the band's "fascination with the conventions of the children's nursery rhyme", and comments on The Bunbury Tails' "eccentric combination" of rabbits and cricket.

== Personnel ==
- George Harrison – vocals, sitars, backing vocals
- Dhani Harrison – vocals
- Ravi Shankar – sitar intro
- David English – vocals
- uncredited musicians – tabla, shehnai, flute, tambura, percussion
- Ray Cooper – percussion

== Sources ==
- Dale C. Allison Jr., The Love There That's Sleeping: The Art and Spirituality of George Harrison, Continuum (New York, NY, 2006; ISBN 978-0-8264-1917-0).
- Keith Badman, The Beatles Diary Volume 2: After the Break-Up 1970–2001, Omnibus Press (London, 2001; ISBN 0-7119-8307-0).
- Eric Clapton, Clapton: The Autobiography, Broadway Books (New York, NY, 2007; ISBN 978-0-7679-2536-5).
- Alan Clayson, George Harrison, Sanctuary (London, 2003; ISBN 1-86074-489-3).
- The Editors of Rolling Stone, Harrison, Rolling Stone Press/Simon & Schuster (New York, NY, 2002; ISBN 0-7432-3581-9).
- Bill Harry, The George Harrison Encyclopedia, Virgin Books (London, 2003; ISBN 978-0-7535-0822-0).
- Elliot J. Huntley, Mystical One: George Harrison – After the Break-up of the Beatles, Guernica Editions (Toronto, ON, 2006; ISBN 1-55071-197-0).
- Ian Inglis, The Words and Music of George Harrison, Praeger (Santa Barbara, CA, 2010; ISBN 978-0-313-37532-3).
- Peter Lavezzoli, The Dawn of Indian Music in the West, Continuum (New York, NY, 2006; ISBN 0-8264-2819-3).
- Simon Leng, While My Guitar Gently Weeps: The Music of George Harrison, Hal Leonard (Milwaukee, WI, 2006; ISBN 1-4234-0609-5).
- Chip Madinger & Mark Easter, Eight Arms to Hold You: The Solo Beatles Compendium, 44.1 Productions (Chesterfield, MO, 2000; ISBN 0-615-11724-4).
- Ravi Shankar, Raga Mala: The Autobiography of Ravi Shankar, Welcome Rain (New York, NY, 1999; ISBN 1-56649-104-5).
- Gary Tillery, Working Class Mystic: A Spiritual Biography of George Harrison, Quest Books (Wheaton, IL, 2011; ISBN 978-0-8356-0900-5).
