= Songs by George Harrison 2 =

1992 book by George Harrison

- Author: George Harrison
- Illustrator: Keith West
- Genre: Music, art
- Publisher: Genesis Publications
- Publication date: 22 June 1992
- Media type: Book with musical disc (vinyl or CD; running time: 16:45)
- ISBN: 0904351394
- Preceded by: Songs by George Harrison

Songs by George Harrison 2 is a book of song lyrics and commentary by English musician George Harrison, with illustrations by Keith West and an accompanying EP of previously unreleased Harrison recordings. It was published in June 1992, in a limited run of 2500 copies, by Genesis Publications. As with Harrison and West's first volume, published in 1988, each copy was hand-bound and available only by direct order through Genesis in England.

The musical disc includes "Tears of the World", a song that Warner Bros. Records had rejected in 1980 for inclusion on Harrison's album Somewhere in England, together with a live version of "Hari's on Tour (Express)". The latter remains a rare officially released recording from Harrison's 1974 North American tour. Also appearing on the disc is "Hottest Gong in Town", one of the songs that Harrison contributed to the soundtrack of his 1986 HandMade Films production Shanghai Surprise.

With Genesis undertaking only a single print run for the book, Songs by George Harrison 2 has become a collector's item. Aside from an alternative mix of "Tears of the World" that appeared as a bonus track on the 2004 reissue of Thirty Three & 1/3, none of the EP's four selections has been reissued on an official release.

== Background ==
George Harrison began working with New Zealand-born artist Keith West in 1985, overseeing West's illustrations to accompany the song lyrics included in Songs by George Harrison, published in February 1988. Limited to a single print run of 2500 copies, and available at considerable expense directly from Genesis Publications in England, the book soon sold out. Although Harrison had discussed a second volume during his late-1987 interview with Musician magazine, its publication did not take place until midway through 1992. In the intervening years, Harrison followed up his 1987 comeback album, Cloud Nine, with two similarly successful albums with the Traveling Wilburys, released in 1988 and 1990, before returning to the collaboration with West.

== Book production ==
Songs by George Harrison 2 contains the lyrics to 59 Harrison compositions, following the 60 included in the first book. Among the songs were "Something", "My Sweet Lord" and "All Things Must Pass". West again supplied a series of watercolours designed to complement the song themes, in addition to hand-lettering the words. The pages, measuring 175 by 250 millimetres, were hand-bound by Genesis inside a black leather cover. On the cover's spine, two gold-leaf stars differentiated the book from the 1988 volume, which carried a single star.

Following the first book's inclusion of a foreword by Jeff Lynne and a "middleword" by Elton John, the new volume featured contributions from other musical associates of Harrison – former Beatles bandmate Ringo Starr and American singer Harry Nilsson. As before, an accompanying music EP was offered in either vinyl or CD format, with the disc housed beside the book in a handmade Solander box.

== Musical content ==
=== "Life Itself" ===
The opening track on the EP is a demo of "Life Itself", which Harrison would re-record with a full band for release on his 1981 album Somewhere in England. Harrison biographer Simon Leng describes the composition as the singer's "love song to his God" and contrasts Harrison's spiritual message with that of Bob Dylan during the same period; unlike Dylan's song "Every Grain of Sand", Leng concludes, "'Life Itself' is the work of a man who has arrived at his destination."

The demo, which features Harrison playing all the musical instruments (accompanied by a drum machine), was made in the months before the album sessions began in March 1980. The musical arrangement differs little from the album version. Noting Harrison's more "delicate performance" on the demo, however, author Ian Inglis views it as "a reminder that, in their formative stages, songs can possess a natural simplicity that is sometimes lost on later versions".

=== "Hottest Gong in Town" ===
"Hottest Gong in Town" was one of five songs that Harrison supplied for his 1986 HandMade Films production Shanghai Surprise. He wrote the track after being told on the film set, in Hong Kong, that two 1937-era songs were required before the shooting schedule moved on to a UK studio, in a matter of days. A pastiche in the style of Cab Calloway, the jazz-influenced composition plays on the slang term for opium – "gong".

Harrison recorded the track at his home studio in Oxfordshire, FPSHOT, in July 1986. The musical backing is credited to "the Zig-Zaggers", a reference to the fictional Zig Zag nightclub, where he performs the song in an early scene in the film. The recording features Harrison on banjo and singing in the jazz scat style he had used on earlier songs such as "The Answer's at the End" and "Not Guilty", and a piano part that recalls the playing of Jelly Roll Morton. Although a soundtrack album was scheduled, it was cancelled after the film's poor critical reception; in 1987, Harrison also cited the "rotten" experience of working with Hollywood actors Madonna and Sean Penn as a reason, and described Shanghai Surprise as the only film that HandMade had not enjoyed making. In December 1987, he suggested that the B-side to his upcoming single, "When We Was Fab", would be "Hottest Gong in Town", but "Zig Zag" (the second period song he provided for Shanghai Surprise) appeared instead.

=== "Tears of the World" ===
"Tears of the World" was recorded for Somewhere in England in April 1980, but was deemed too uncommercial for release by Warner Bros. Records, the distributor of Harrison's Dark Horse label. After the inclusion of "Sat Singing", "Lay His Head" and "Flying Hour" on the Songs by George Harrison EP in 1988, the song's appearance in 1992 marked the last of the four tracks that Warner's had rejected.

Harrison recorded "Tears of the World" at FPSHOT, with musicians including Tom Scott, Neil Larsen, Willie Weeks and Jim Keltner. In his lyrics, Harrison bemoans the actions of politicians, military leaders and business concerns, who conspire to pollute the environment and maintain an ever-present threat of nuclear disaster. Late in the song, he asks "Where's your love been sleeping?", so recalling a line from "While My Guitar Gently Weeps", another song in which Harrison expresses his sadness at the world's apparent failure to consider the consequences of its actions.

=== "Hari's on Tour (Express)" ===
An instrumental, "Hari's on Tour (Express)" was the opening track of Harrison's 1974 album Dark Horse and the opening song throughout his North American tour with Ravi Shankar, held over November–December 1974. The live version on the Songs by George Harrison 2 EP was taken from a 13 December performance at the Capital Centre near Washington, DC, according to the disc's credits. Authors Chip Madinger and Mark Easter suggest that the track was in fact a composite of this 13 December evening performance and the afternoon concert at Toronto's Maple Leaf Gardens on 6 December.

"Hari's on Tour" was only the second recording to be officially released from this tour, after "For You Blue" had appeared on the EP accompanying Harrison and West's 1988 book. Harrison's band again included Scott, Weeks and Keltner, along with musicians such as Billy Preston, Andy Newmark and Jim Horn.

== Release and legacy ==
Songs by George Harrison 2 was published on 22 June 1992, with the Genesis Publications catalogue number SGH 778. As with the first volume, the print run was limited to 2500, with each copy signed by Harrison and West. A deluxe publication, the book was available from Genesis via mail order, with a price equivalent to $US510 at contemporary exchange rates. The arrival of this second volume preceded the release of Harrison's Live in Japan double album, for which he and Genesis issued another limited-edition book the following year.

As with the first volume of Songs, the exclusivity of the publication ensured that the four recordings remained inaccessible to most Harrison fans. While focusing on each book as primarily a Harrison EP release, Ian Inglis views the format as "surprising", and bemoans that "instead of being available to all, the EP was sold as a limited-edition, high-cost package that remained unheard, unseen, and unavailable to the vast majority of international audiences." In his 1987 Musician interview, Harrison had discussed the two Songs by George Harrison volumes in the context of artistic works, with each accompanying disc serving as a "free record"; Harrison added: "It could only be done in a limited edition because if you printed it cheap, you'd lose the value of it."

Another Harrison biographer, Elliot Huntley, describes Songs by George Harrison 2 as "once again, an instantly collectible thing of beauty". While remarking also on the set's prohibitive price – together with the fact that the only new Harrison song available to the average consumer in 1992 was the similarly rare "Ride Rajbun" – Huntley writes that the tracks from the two Genesis EPs could have been combined to "form the spine of a nice little album".

All four tracks from the EP became available in 1995 on the Vigotone Records bootleg compilation Pirate Songs. Apart from an alternative mix of "Tears of the World" appearing as a bonus track on the 2004 reissue of Harrison's Thirty Three & 1/3 album, the Songs by George Harrison 2 EP remains the only official release for the four recordings. In addition, other than "Hari's on Tour" and "For You Blue", no Harrison song from his 1974 North American tour has received an official release.

== Track listing ==
All songs written by George Harrison.

1. "Life Itself" [demo] – 4:25
2. "Hottest Gong in Town" – 3:39
3. "Tears of the World" – 3:48
4. "Hari's on Tour (Express)" [live] – 4:53

== Personnel ==
- George Harrison – vocals, electric and acoustic guitars, bass, banjo, percussion, backing vocals
- "the Zig-Zaggers" – piano, drums, saxophones, clarinets, tuba, trombone, percussion (track 2)
- Neil Larsen – piano (track 3)
- Gary Brooker – synthesizer (3)
- Tom Scott – saxophones (tracks 3, 4)
- Willie Weeks – bass (tracks 3, 4)
- Jim Keltner – drums (tracks 3, 4)
- Ray Cooper – percussion (tracks 3, 4)
- Robben Ford – electric guitar (track 4)
- Billy Preston – organ (track 4)
- Jim Horn – saxophone (track 4)
- Chuck Findley – trumpet (track 4)
- Andy Newmark – drums (track 4)
- Emil Richards – percussion (track 4)

== Sources ==
- Dale C. Allison Jr., The Love There That's Sleeping: The Art and Spirituality of George Harrison, Continuum (New York, NY, 2006; ISBN 978-0-8264-1917-0).
- Keith Badman, The Beatles Diary Volume 2: After the Break-Up 1970–2001, Omnibus Press (London, 2001; ISBN 0-7119-8307-0).
- Alan Clayson, George Harrison, Sanctuary (London, 2003; ISBN 1-86074-489-3).
- The Editors of Rolling Stone, Harrison, Rolling Stone Press/Simon & Schuster (New York, NY, 2002; ISBN 0-7432-3581-9).
- Bill Harry, The George Harrison Encyclopedia, Virgin Books (London, 2003; ISBN 978-0753508220).
- Elliot J. Huntley, Mystical One: George Harrison – After the Break-up of the Beatles, Guernica Editions (Toronto, ON, 2006; ISBN 1-55071-197-0).
- Ian Inglis, The Words and Music of George Harrison, Praeger (Santa Barbara, CA, 2010; ISBN 978-0-313-37532-3).
- Peter Lavezzoli, The Dawn of Indian Music in the West, Continuum (New York, NY, 2006; ISBN 0-8264-2819-3).
- Simon Leng, While My Guitar Gently Weeps: The Music of George Harrison, Hal Leonard (Milwaukee, WI, 2006; ISBN 1-4234-0609-5).
- Chip Madinger & Mark Easter, Eight Arms to Hold You: The Solo Beatles Compendium, 44.1 Productions (Chesterfield, MO, 2000; ISBN 0-615-11724-4).
- The New Rolling Stone Encyclopedia of Rock & Roll, Fireside/Rolling Stone Press (New York, NY, 1995; ISBN 0-684-81044-1).
- Robert Rodriguez, Fab Four FAQ 2.0: The Beatles' Solo Years, 1970–1980, Backbeat Books (Milwaukee, WI, 2010; ISBN 978-1-4165-9093-4).
- Timothy White, "George Harrison – Reconsidered", Musician, November 1987, pp. 50–67.
