= Hong Kong Blues =

1939 song written by Hoagy Carmichael

"Hong Kong Blues" is a popular song composed by American songwriter Hoagy Carmichael in 1939. It was featured in the 1944 film To Have and Have Not, an adaptation of Ernest Hemingway's novel by the same name.

== George Harrison version ==
"Hong Kong Blues"

Song by George Harrison

from the album Somewhere in England
- Released: 5 June 1981
- Recorded: 1980–1981
- Genre: Rock
- Length: 2:55
- Label: Dark Horse
- Songwriter: Hoagy Carmichael
- Producers: George Harrison, Ray Cooper

Somewhere in England track listing
- 10 tracks Side one: 1. "Blood from a Clone"; 2. "Unconsciousness Rules"; 3. "Life Itself"; 4. "All Those Years Ago"; 5. "Baltimore Oriole"; Side two: 6. "Teardrops"; 7. "That Which I Have Lost"; 8. "Writing's on the Wall"; 9. "Hong Kong Blues"; 10. "Save the World"

Former Beatle George Harrison covered the tune on his 1981 album Somewhere in England. It was later featured as a b-side to "This Is Love" single in 1988.

== Other versions ==
- Martin Denny covered it on his 1957 album Exotica.
- In 1964 it was a UK single from Kenny Ball and his Jazzmen. This version was included on 2002, LP The Pye Jazz Anthology.
- Spanky and Our Gang covered "Hong Kong Blues" on their third album, Anything You Choose/Without Rhyme or Reason, 1969.
- Japanese musician Haruomi Hosono, who was influenced by Denny to found the Yellow Magic Orchestra, covered the song on his 1976 album Bon Voyage co., as well as on two live albums, Harry Hosono and Tin Pan Alley in Chinatown, recorded in Yokohama the same year, and America, recorded in Los Angeles in 2019.
- The Quebecer Dédé Fortin presented his cover of "Hong Kong Blues" with Les Colocs on their 1995 album Atrocetomique.
