= Bunbury Festival (cricket) =

Cricket tournament

The Bunbury Festival, formally known as the ECB David English Bunbury Festival, is an annual cricket tournament for the best under-15 boys players in England.

== History ==
The tournament was founded as a successor to the England Schools Under-15s Festival. Without funds and facing cancellation, David English, a former manager of the Bee Gees and Eric Clapton, was asked to finance the tournament and agreed to on the condition he could name the tournament after his Bunbury Tales children's books.

The festival was first held in 1987, remaining under the management of the English Schools Cricket Association. The England and Wales Cricket Board took over the running of the tournament in 2018, renaming the festival to include the name of its founder. The event also became the first stage in the ECB's Player Pathway to the England cricket team.

The current format sees 56 players divided into four squads based on their county of origin: London & East, South & West, Midlands and North. The squads compete in 50-over and Twenty20 competitions.

As of 2018, 91 of the cricketers who have played at the tournament have gone on to play for England, including national team captains Michael Vaughan, Andrew Flintoff and Joe Root, while 10 of 11 England players in 2019 Cricket World Cup final played at the event. England football internationals Joe Hart and Phil Neville have also played at the festival.

The tournament was not held in 2020 due to the COVID-19 pandemic.
