= Greenpeace – The Album =

Compilation album by Various Artists
- Released: 4 June 1985
- Genres: Pop, rock, new wave
- Label: Greenpeace
- Producer: Matthew Davis (exec.)

Greenpeace – The Album is a multi-artist compilation album that was released in June 1985 to raise funds and awareness for the environmental organisation Greenpeace. It was compiled by the UK branch of the organisation and issued on Greenpeace Records with distribution by EMI. The album includes songs by British contemporary new wave artists such as Depeche Mode, Tears for Fears, Eurythmics, Howard Jones, Madness and Heaven 17, and others by rock or pop artists including Peter Gabriel, George Harrison, Kate Bush, Queen and the Pretenders.

The album was released in North America by A&M Records on 19 August 1985, over a month after the sinking of Greenpeace's flagship, the Rainbow Warrior. The album cover contains a photo of the ship taken by Dutch freelance photographer Fernando Pereira, who was killed in the sinking.

== Background ==
Greenpeace – The Album was inspired by two similar multi-artist musical projects compiled in Denmark and West Germany. According to Greenpeace activist Tom Campbell, the UK project was conceived as a relatively minor undertaking, but "the thing snowballed, with more and more acts volunteering songs for the record." Explaining their support in a 1985 interview, Suggs and Carl Smyth of Madness said that they admired the activists' boldness in dealing directly with environmental problems around the world; Suggs said: "Greenpeace are ecologists but they do things. They don't have debates, they don't have marches, they just do things."

The majority of the 16 contributions to the album were previously released songs and, in some cases, had become chart hits. An exception was "Push and Shove" by Hazel O'Connor and Chris Thompson, which was recorded for the compilation and produced by Haydn Bendall, who also oversaw technical coordination for the album. Also exclusive to the 1985 release, George Harrison remixed his 1981 track "Save the World" and recorded a new vocal with the lyrics tailored more to Greenpeace's cause. The Pretenders' contribution, "Show Me", was a live version of their 1984 single, recorded in Detroit.

== Video release and sequel ==
The album was followed by a home video compilation, titled Greenpeace: Non-Toxic Video Hits, which included videos for many of the songs from the album. The release took place on 5 December 1985 in the UK and 16 April 1986 in the US.

A second fundraising album, Greenpeace: Rainbow Warriors, was released in the summer of 1989. Among its 31 tracks were further contributions from Peter Gabriel, U2, R.E.M, and Grateful Dead. The album was first released in March 1989 through the Melodiya record label in the Soviet Union, where four million copies of the album were pressed and later distributed. According to the San Francisco Chronicle, it was the "first Western pop album to be widely distributed in the Soviet Union". Three months later, Geffen Records released the album in North America. Proceeds from albums sales were directed to Greenpeace.

== Track listing ==
Side one
No.	Title	Performer(s)	Length
1.	"Shock the Monkey"	Peter Gabriel	5:45
2.	"Is This the World We Created?"	Queen	2:11
3.	"Turn Your Back on Me"	Kajagoogoo	2:28
4.	"Windpower"	Thomas Dolby	3:49
5.	"Mad World"	Tears for Fears	3:32
6.	"Breathing"	Kate Bush	5:31
7.	"Let's All Make a Bomb"	Heaven 17	4:05
8.	"Show Me [live]"	The Pretenders	4:29

Side two
No.	Title	Performer(s)	Length
9.	"Push and Shove"	Hazel O'Connor & Chris Thompson	4:15
10.	"Equality"	Howard Jones	4:30
11.	"Wings of a Dove"	Madness	3:02
12.	"Human Racing"	Nik Kershaw	4:26
13.	"Save the World"	George Harrison	4:58
14.	"Killing Time"	Roger Taylor	4:58
15.	"Blasphemous Rumours"	Depeche Mode	5:07
16.	"No Fear, No Hate, No Pain (No Broken Hearts)"	Eurythmics	5:32
