= Postcards from the Boys =

2004 book by Ringo Starr

- Author: Ringo Starr
- Genre: Non-fiction
- Publisher: Genesis
- Publication date: 9 September 2004
- ISBN: 9780811846134

Postcards from the Boys is a book by Ringo Starr released in 2004. It features reproductions of postcards sent to Starr by the other three members of the Beatles, along with his commentary. The postcards range from the mid-1960s to the 1990s.

The first printing was a limited, signed collector's edition of 2,500 copies, with proceeds going to charity.

According to a review in The Guardian, the cards are of pop cultural interest "not least for the glimpses they afford of each of the Beatles' characters. Paul is the most informative, George the most oblique, Lennon the most sarcastic and surreal." A review in The New York Times stated: "The postcards in the book are often amusing, sometimes touching and occasionally trite. But in their whimsy, they offer a fresh, unfiltered look at the goings-on of the Beatles at the peak of their popularity and beyond."
