= David English (cricketer) =

British cricketer (1946–2022)

David Stuart English, CBE (4 March 1946 – 12 November 2022) was a British charity fundraiser, cricketer, actor, writer and former president of RSO Records. He was appointed MBE in the 2003 Birthday Honours, and CBE in the 2010 Birthday Honours for services to cricket and charity.

English founded the Bunbury Cricket Club, through which he raised £14m for charity. He was involved in the creation of the Bunbury Festival, a British under-15s cricket tournament that has helped the careers of over 1000 first-class cricketers, and over 125 international players.

English was a journalist on the Daily Sketch and then worked for Decca Records. At Decca he was press officer, handling publicity for artists including the Rolling Stones and Tom Jones. He became President of RSO Records, signing artists including the Bee Gees and Eric Clapton. English had a career in acting, appearing in the films A Bridge Too Far (1977) and Lisztomania (1975). He wrote a series of children's books called Bunbury Tails and a spin off animated series called The Bunbury Tails.

== Early life ==
English was born in London on 4 March 1946, and grew up in Hendon. After leaving school, he worked on the ground staff at Lord's Cricket Ground. He later played cricket for the Marylebone Cricket Club.

== Bunbury cricket club ==
English set up Bunbury cricket club as a vehicle to raise funds for charity through which he raised £14m. The club recruited celebrities and former cricketers to play matches. English was appointed CBE in the 2010 Birthday Honours for services to cricket and charity. He had previously been appointed MBE in the 2003 Birthday Honours for services to charity.

== Bunbury Festival ==
In 1987, English was asked to fund the ECB annual schools cricket competition. In return the competition was renamed The Bunbury Festival after his series of children's books. In 2019, the England cricket team won the one day world cup and had ten players who had attended the Bunbury Festival as youths. The festival supported the careers of over 1000 first-class cricketers, and over 125 international players.

== Music, media and acting career ==
English was a journalist on the Daily Mail and worked for Decca Records. At Decca he was press officer, handling publicity for artists including the Rolling Stones and Tom Jones. He became President of RSO Records, signing artists including the Bee Gees and Eric Clapton. English had a career in acting, appearing in the films A Bridge Too Far and Lisztomania.

== Bunbury Tails ==
Bunbury Tails is a series of children's books written by David English. The plot for the books focussed on the exploits of a rabbit cricket team. The characters from the books were later used for an animated series called The Bunbury Tails.

The characters in the books are rabbit puns on sporting personalities, mainly but not exclusively cricketers. Characters include: Ian Buntham (Ian Botham), Goldenhare Gower (David Gower), Dennis Lettuce (Dennis Lillee), Viv Radish (Viv Richards), Frank Buno (Frank Bruno) and Rajbun (Rajendrasinh Jadeja).

== The Bunbury Tails ==
The Bunbury Tails is a 1992 children's British animated TV series based upon the books. It was created by David English and Jan Brychta, and broadcast on Channel 4. Five episodes were made, with a theme song by David English and Barry Gibb and additional music by Elton John, Eric Clapton, The Bee Gees and George Harrison, who contributed the track "Ride Rajbun". An album of the music was also released with the same name with proceeds going to charity.

== Death ==
English died of a heart attack on 12 November 2022, at the age of 76. He was survived by his children (Amy and David Jr) and his partner Lia Lanaja.

The day after his death, the England cricket team playing in the 2022 ICC Men's T20 World Cup Final wore black armbands as a mark of respect.

The England and Wales Cricket Board wrote: "The ECB is saddened to learn of the loss of David English CBE. He did so much for the game, and for charity, and he played a part in the rise of many England Men’s cricketers. Our thoughts at this time are with his friends and family."

== Autobiographies ==
English wrote two autobiographies;

- English, David (2006). Confessions of a dedicated Englishman : the hilarious, heartwarming and heady world of the actor, music producer and 'Godfather of English cricket'. London: Macmillan. ISBN 1-4050-5361-5.
- English, David (2003). Mad dogs and the Englishman : confessions of a loon. London: Virgin. ISBN 978-0753508169.
