= Songs by George Harrison =

Book by George Harrison

- Cover of the book
- Author: George Harrison
- Illustrator: Keith West
- Genre: Music, art
- Publisher: Genesis Publications
- Publication date: 15 February 1988
- Media type: Book with musical disc (vinyl or CD; running time: 17:10)
- Pages: 176
- ISBN: 0-904351-36-X
- Followed by: Songs by George Harrison 2

Songs by George Harrison is a book of song lyrics and commentary by English musician George Harrison, with illustrations by New Zealand artist Keith West. It was published in February 1988, in a limited run of 2500 copies, by Genesis Publications, and included an EP of rare or previously unreleased Harrison recordings. Intended as a luxury item, each copy was hand-bound and boxed, and available only by direct order through Genesis in England. The book contains the lyrics to 60 Harrison compositions, the themes of which West represents visually with watercolour paintings. Starting in 1985, Harrison and West worked on the project for two years, during which Harrison returned to music-making with his album Cloud Nine, after focusing on film production for much of the early 1980s. The book includes a foreword by his Cloud Nine co-producer, Jeff Lynne, and a written contribution from Elton John.

The musical disc contains three songs that Warner Bros. Records had rejected in 1980 for inclusion on Harrison's album Somewhere in England, together with a live version of his Beatles track "For You Blue". This last song was recorded during Harrison's controversial 1974 North American tour, when his singing was marred by the effects of laryngitis; it remains the only vocal performance from that tour to have been made available outside of concert bootlegs. While "Lay His Head" was issued as the B-side to his 1987 single "Got My Mind Set on You", the Songs by George Harrison EP remains the sole official release for this live version of "For You Blue" and for the studio tracks "Sat Singing" and "Flying Hour".

Genesis undertook a single print run for the book, after which Songs by George Harrison became a highly priced collector's item. It was followed by a second volume, published in 1992. AllMusic describes the EP as "remarkable" and "classic Harrison".

== Background ==
George Harrison first worked with Genesis Publications on his 1980 autobiography, I Me Mine, for which his friend Derek Taylor served as editor and narrator. Harrison subsequently edited Taylor's memoir, Fifty Years Adrift, which Genesis published in its customary, limited-edition, deluxe format in 1984. That year, Brian Roylance, the owner of Genesis Publications, met a New Zealand-based botanical artist named Keith West, whose work Roylance considered might be suitable for a proposed illustrated book of Harrison's songs.

Since 1982, when he released the little-promoted Gone Troppo album, Harrison had minimised his musical activities in favour of a role as a film producer, with the success of his company HandMade Films. The content of his previous album, Somewhere in England, had been the subject of scrutiny by Warner Bros. Records, the distributor of Harrison's Dark Horse record label; as a result, Harrison was obliged to replace four of the songs intended for that album with more commercial-sounding recordings for its eventual release, in mid 1981. On the musical disc accompanying the Songs by George Harrison book, Harrison decided to include three of the tracks that Warner Bros. had rejected. The fourth of those 1980 recordings, "Tears of the World", would appear on the EP accompanying Harrison and West's 1992 illustrated book, Songs by George Harrison 2.

== Production ==
Having relocated to north Wales by 1985, West met with Harrison regularly over a period of two years at the latter's Oxfordshire estate, Friar Park. The pair discussed the images required for all of Harrison's songs, in order to ensure empathy between the illustrations and the message behind the lyrics. West worked up pencil sketches, which he would submit to Harrison, before completing the final watercolour illustrations.

Songs by George Harrison contains the lyrics to 60 of Harrison's compositions, for each of which West hand-lettered the words. Harrison provided text commenting on the story behind some of the songs, along with facsimiles of his original lyric sheets. The book was bound inside a black leather cover, and ran to 176 pages, measuring 175 by 250 millimetres.

During the two-year period of production, Harrison resumed a more active musical career, which included working with producer Jeff Lynne on the soundtrack to HandMade Films' Shanghai Surprise in 1986 before recording his first album in five years, Cloud Nine. The book includes a foreword by Lynne, a "middleword" by Elton John, and a "backword" by Harrison. The accompanying EP was offered in either vinyl or CD format, with the disc housed beside the book in a handmade Solander box.

== Musical content ==
=== "Sat Singing" ===
The opening track on the EP, the 1979-copyright "Sat Singing", was recorded at Harrison's Friar Park studio, FPSHOT, in March 1980. Among Harrison biographers, Simon Leng views the song as a "pivotal composition" in the artist's career, while Dale Allison considers it to be "a crucial song for interpreting George's religiosity". The lyrics document an afternoon spent immersed in meditation, during which the singer surrenders the distractions of the physical world for a communion with his deity. The title references the Sanskrit term sat-sang, which means time spent in the company of "the highest truth", such as with one's guru. Leng describes the song as "a companion piece" to the Beatles' "Tomorrow Never Knows", in that "Sat Singing" represents the "attainment" of John Lennon's earlier exhortation to "Turn off your mind, relax and float downstream".

=== "Lay His Head" ===
Like "Sat Singing", "Lay His Head" was recorded during the sessions for Somewhere in England, in April 1980. The title refers to a phrase from the gospels of St Matthew and St Luke that Harrison had taken to quoting when referring to the lack of privacy afforded him and his Beatles bandmates during the 1960s. In his adaptation, the phrase became: "Foxes have holes and birds have nests, but Beatles have nowhere to lay their heads." Leng views the song as a reflection on "what a man loses when he becomes a media entity: a connection with other people that everyone else takes for granted".

Harrison carried out further work on the recording in August 1987. In October that year, "Lay His Head" was released as the B-side to "Got My Mind Set on You", the lead single from Cloud Nine. The version on Songs by George Harrison used the same mix as that issued on the single, which differed from the 1980 recording through the increased presence of percussion and drums. Percussionist Ray Cooper was credited as co-producer with Harrison.

=== "For You Blue" ===
Originally recorded by the Beatles and released on their 1970 album Let It Be, "For You Blue" was one of the relatively few Beatles songs that Harrison chose to perform on his 1974 North American tour with Ravi Shankar. The live version issued on Songs by George Harrison was the first recording from these 1974 concerts to receive an official release, despite Harrison's statements post-tour that a full live album would be made available.

Although the EP credits read "Live in Washington DC", the song was recorded in nearby Largo, Maryland, on 13 December 1974. The performance features solos from Robben Ford (on electric guitar), Emil Richards (marimba) and Willie Weeks (bass). During the tour, many reviewers had criticised Harrison for, variously, giving over stage-time to his fellow musicians, being scornful of his audience's nostalgia for the Beatles, and performing with a voice ravaged by the effects of laryngitis. In response, Leng writes that this live version of "For You Blue" contradicts the "'given' view" espoused by Rolling Stone magazine that Harrison's 1974 concerts were a "calamity". In 2001, Record Collector editor Peter Doggett similarly commented on the track, with regard to the singer's vocal issues: "Thankfully, the solitary official evidence of the tour ... showed little evidence of the strain."

=== "Flying Hour" ===
Although Harrison had intended it for inclusion on Somewhere in England, "Flying Hour" dated from the sessions for his previous album, George Harrison (1979), and was recorded in April 1978. He wrote the song with Bad Company guitarist Mick Ralphs, who was among a coterie of local rock musicians, known informally as "the Henley Music Mafia", with whom Harrison played and socialised from the late 1970s onwards. The lyrics recall the theme of Harrison's 1973 track "Be Here Now", by advocating focusing only on the present. He adapted part of the words from an inscription on a clock tower at Friar Park, a legacy of the property's original owner, Frank Crisp. According to Harrison's wife, Olivia, each time they walked past the clock tower, he made a point of reading the inscription aloud:

Past is gone, thou canst not that recall
Future is not, may not be at all
Present is, [so] improve the flying hour
Present only is within thy power.

Among the changes carried out when Harrison revisited "Flying Hour" in 1987, the track has a longer running time than the 1980 mix, partly through the reinstating of a 20-second instrumental break late in the song, and Harrison's slide guitar features less prominently. It also plays at the proper speed which gives the song a much more dull feel. The track is driven by Weeks' bassline and includes Polymoog synthesizer soloing from Steve Winwood. In Leng's opinion, "Flying Hour" typifies Harrison's predicament with Warner's in 1980, in that the song would have been "a sure-fire hit in 1973" but was deemed unsuitable for commercial release seven years later.

== Publication ==
[The book] could only be done in a limited edition because if you printed it cheap, you'd lose the value of it ... It's expensive, yes, but in a world of crass, disposable junk, it's meant to be a lovely thing.

— George Harrison, 1987

Songs by George Harrison was published on 15 February 1988, with the Genesis Publications catalogue number SGH 777. The print run was limited to 2500, with each copy signed by Harrison and West. The book was priced at £235 and available via mail order only. Genesis also offered the book as a limited-edition series of enlarged prints.

The release coincided with Harrison's uncharacteristically high-profile publicity for Cloud Nine, which was a critical and commercial success when issued in November 1987. In an interview published in Musician magazine that same month, Harrison spoke of a planned second volume with West, and he defended the exclusivity of Songs by George Harrison by saying, "in a world of crass, disposable junk, it's meant to be a lovely thing."

Harrison and his wife returned to England from California for the book's publication. He subsequently promoted Songs by George Harrison during his Cloud Nine publicity activities in Europe.

== Reception and legacy ==
Despite its high price, Songs by George Harrison sold well. Typically for a Genesis title, however, the publication's availability was confined to its initial print run.

In a four-star rating for the EP, J.T. Griffith of AllMusic describes it as "one of the essential additions to any serious Beatles or George Harrison collection" and he concludes: "Songs By George Harrison is remarkable ... the songs are classic Harrison." Writing for Rolling Stone in 2002, Greg Kot highlighted "Sat Singing" and "Lay His Head" among the "gems" offered on the disc. That same year, Dave Thompson of Goldmine similarly admired the 1980-recorded tracks; he said that their rejection had been "a criminal decision on the label's part" since otherwise Somewhere in England "could easily have taken its place among the elite of solo Beatledom".

While lamenting that Songs by George Harrison was "an heirloom-quality item (with a price to match)", and so prohibitive to the majority of Harrison's audience, author Robert Rodriguez considers that Warner Bros. "displayed appalling judgment" in overlooking "Sat Singing" and particularly "Flying Hour", which he describes as "a breezy tune filled to the brim with hooks". Simon Leng admires the reinterpretation of "For You Blue" as a rhythm and blues "jam track" and praises "Sat Singing" for its "melody of some beauty, colored by warm, golden slide guitar". Leng adds that "As a musical essay on serenity and joy, ['Sat Singing'] is one of Harrison's best", yet he also identifies an isolationist perspective on the three 1980 recordings that reflected the singer's failure to appreciate the market forces with which Warner's had to contend.

The 1988 Genesis publication remains the only formal release for "Sat Singing", "Flying Hour" and the live "For You Blue", although all four tracks from the EP became available in 1995 on the bootleg compilation Pirate Songs. While a live version of the instrumental "Hari's on Tour (Express)" from Harrison's 1974 tour appeared on the Songs by George Harrison 2 EP, "For You Blue" remains the only vocal track from that tour to receive an official release.

In December 2006, Record Collector magazine ranked Songs by George Harrison 122nd in its list of "The 250 Most Valuable Records of Our Time", with an estimated value of £800 for the book and disc set. Dale Allison describes it as "obscure, hard-to-get, and very expensive".

== Track listing ==
All songs written by George Harrison, except where noted. All track-list information per CD label.

1. "Sat Singing" – 4:30
2. "Lay His Head" – 3:50
3. "For You Blue" [live] – 4:08
4. "Flying Hour" (Harrison, Mick Ralphs) – 4:32

== Sources ==
- Dale C. Allison Jr., The Love There That's Sleeping: The Art and Spirituality of George Harrison, Continuum (New York, NY, 2006; ISBN 978-0-8264-1917-0).
- Keith Badman, The Beatles Diary Volume 2: After the Break-Up 1970–2001, Omnibus Press (London, 2001; ISBN 0-7119-8307-0).
- Alan Clayson, George Harrison, Sanctuary (London, 2003; ISBN 1-86074-489-3).
- The Editors of Rolling Stone, Harrison, Rolling Stone Press/Simon & Schuster (New York, NY, 2002; ISBN 0-7432-3581-9).
- Joshua M. Greene, Here Comes the Sun: The Spiritual and Musical Journey of George Harrison, John Wiley & Sons (Hoboken, NJ, 2006; ISBN 978-0-470-12780-3).
- Olivia Harrison, George Harrison: Living in the Material World, Abrams (New York, NY, 2011; ISBN 978-1-4197-0220-4).
- Bill Harry, The George Harrison Encyclopedia, Virgin Books (London, 2003; ISBN 978-0-7535-0822-0).
- Elliot J. Huntley, Mystical One: George Harrison – After the Break-up of the Beatles, Guernica Editions (Toronto, ON, 2006; ISBN 1-55071-197-0).
- Ian Inglis, The Words and Music of George Harrison, Praeger (Santa Barbara, CA, 2010; ISBN 978-0-313-37532-3).
- Colin Larkin, The Encyclopedia of Popular Music (5th edn), Omnibus Press (London, 2011; ISBN 978-0-85712-595-8).
- Simon Leng, While My Guitar Gently Weeps: The Music of George Harrison, Hal Leonard (Milwaukee, WI, 2006; ISBN 1-4234-0609-5).
- Chip Madinger & Mark Easter, Eight Arms to Hold You: The Solo Beatles Compendium, 44.1 Productions (Chesterfield, MO, 2000; ISBN 0-615-11724-4).
- Robert Rodriguez, Fab Four FAQ 2.0: The Beatles' Solo Years, 1970–1980, Backbeat Books (Milwaukee, WI, 2010; ISBN 978-1-4165-9093-4).
- Nicholas Schaffner, The Beatles Forever, McGraw-Hill (New York, NY, 1978; ISBN 0-07-055087-5).
- Gary Tillery, Working Class Mystic: A Spiritual Biography of George Harrison, Quest Books (Wheaton, IL, 2011; ISBN 978-0-8356-0900-5).
