= Genesis Publications =

British publisher

- Founded: 1974
- Founder: Brian Roylance
- Country of origin: United Kingdom
- Nonfiction topics: Historical volumes; popular music; modern culture
- Owners: Nick Roylance; Catherine Roylance
- Official website: www.genesis-publications.com

Genesis Publications Limited is a British publishing company founded in 1974 by Brian Roylance, a former student of the London College of Printing. His aim was to create a company in the traditions of the private press, true to the arts of printing and book binding. Headed today by his son and daughter, Nick and Catherine Roylance (also a former student of the London College of Printing), Genesis Publications produces signed, limited edition books that are created in close collaboration with authors and artists.

First known for specialising in historical volumes, Genesis is now known as an art house publisher in the fields of modern music and culture. The company's first title to depart from historical reproductions was former Beatle George Harrison's autobiography, I, Me, Mine, published in 1980. The 2017 Extended Edition of the latter title, compiled by Harrison's widow Olivia, was the 100th book published by Genesis.

== Bibliography ==
=== Beatles ===
- 1980 I, Me, Mine by George Harrison (edited by Derek Taylor)
- 1984 Fifty Years Adrift by Derek Taylor (edited by George Harrison)
- 1987 It Was Twenty Years Ago Today by Derek Taylor
- 1988 Songs by George Harrison by George Harrison (illustrations by Keith West)
- 1992 Songs by George Harrison 2 by George Harrison (illustrations by Keith West)
- 1993 Live in Japan 1991 by George Harrison
- 1994 Liverpool Days by Max Scheler with Astrid Kirchherr
- 1995 Paul McCartney: Yesterday & Today by Ray Coleman
- 1995 Sometime in New York City by Bob Gruen with Yoko Ono
- 1996 Stuart: The Life and Art of Stuart Sutcliffe by Kay Williams and Pauline Sutcliffe
- 1996 Golden Dreams by Max Scheler with Astrid Kirchherr
- 1997 Raga Mala by Ravi Shankar (edited by George Harrison)
- 1997 From Hamburg to Hollywood by Jürgen Vollmer
- 1997 BIG: Beatles in Germany by Günter Zint (with Ulf Krüger and Tony Sheridan)
- 1999 Hamburg days by Klaus Voormann and Astrid Kirchherr
- 2000 Mania Days by Curt Gunther
- 2002 Playback by George Martin
- 2003 Postcards From the Boys by Ringo Starr
- 2003 When We Was Fab by Astrid Kirchherr
- 2004 Concert for George by Olivia Harrison
- 2006 Now These Days Are Gone by Michael Peto
- 2006 Summer of Love by George Martin
- 2006 A Day in the Life: Photographs of the Beatles by Michael Ward
- 2014 Yoko Ono: Infinite Universe at Dawn by Yoko Ono
- 2014 Photograph by Ringo Starr
- 2016 Hello Goodbye: The Beatles in Tokyo, 1966 by Shimpei Asai
- 2017 I Me Mine – The Extended Edition by George Harrison with Derek Taylor and Olivia Harrison

=== Rolling Stones ===
- 1990 Blinds and Shutters by Michael Cooper
- 1995 Masons Yard to Primrose Hill 65–67 by Gered Mankowitz
- 1997 Crossfire Hurricane by Bob Gruen
- 1998 Wyman Shoots Chagall by Bill Wyman
- 1998 Wood on Canvas: Every Picture Tells a Story by Ronnie Wood
- 1999 I Contact: The Gered Mankowitz Archives by Gered Mankowitz
- 1999 Pleased to Meet You by Michael Putland
- 2001 Exile by Dominique Tarlé with Keith Richards
- 2005 T.O.T.A. '75 – Tour of the Americas 1975 by The Rolling Stones and Christopher Simon Sykes
- 2015 How Can It Be? A Rock & Roll Diary by Ronnie Wood

=== Bob Dylan ===
- 1999 Early Dylan (with Arlo Guthrie)
- 2000 Dylan in Woodstock by Elliott Landy
- 2006 Thin Wild Mercury by Jerry Schatzberg
- 2008 Real Moments: Photographs of Bob Dylan 1966–1974 by Barry Feinstein

=== Pink Floyd ===
- 2001 Psychedelic Renegades by Syd Barrett with Mick Rock
- 2004 Inside Out: A Personal History of Pink Floyd by Nick Mason
- 2007 Taken by Storm by Storm Thorgerson

=== David Bowie ===
- 2002 Moonage Daydream: The Life and Times of Ziggy Stardust by Mick Rock with David Bowie
- 2007 From Station to Station by Geoff McCormack and David Bowie
- 2012 Bowie: Speed of Life by Sukita and David Bowie

=== Others ===
- 1979 Alice's Adventures Underground by Lewis Carroll
- 1991 24 Nights by Eric Clapton; scrapbook by Peter Blake
- 2000 The Greatest Live Rock 'n' Roll Band in the World: The Who Live at Leeds by Ross Halfin with Pete Townshend
- 2000 Lovers & Other Strangers by Jack Vettriano with Anthony Quinn
- 2002 Maximum Who by Ross Halfin with Roger Daltrey and John Entwistle
- 2002 A Time to Live (with Michael Palin)
- 2003 Killer Queen by Brian May with Roger Taylor and Mick Rock
- 2004 Classic Hendrix by Ross Halfin
- 2004 Rebel Music: Bob Marley & Roots Reggae by Kate Simon
- 2005 Heroes & Villains by David Steen with Roger Moore
- 2007 Elvis & the Birth of Rock by Lew Allen
- 2007 California Dreaming: Memories and Visions of LA: 1966–1975 by Henry Diltz
- 2008 A Thousand Things by Paul Weller
- 2009 Ray Charles – Yes Indeed! by Joe Adams
- 2009 Woodstock Experience by Michael Lang, Dan Garson and Henry Diltz
- 2009 That Lucky Old Sun by Brian Wilson and Peter Blake
- 2009 The Traveling Wilburys by the Traveling Wilburys
- 2010 Jimmy Page by Jimmy Page
- 2011 Faces, 1969–75 by Ronnie Wood, Ian McLagan and Kenney Jones
- 2011 Six-String Stories: The Crossroads guitars by Eric Clapton
- 2011 Sojourner by Ross Halfin
- 2013 Transformer by Lou Reed with Mick Rock
- 2014 Into Tomorrow by Paul Weller and Lawrence Watson
