= Baltimore Oriole (song) =

1942 song by Hoagy Carmichael and Paul Francis Webster

"Baltimore Oriole" is a 1942 song written by American composer Hoagy Carmichael with lyrics by Paul Francis Webster and Carmichael.

Like those of Carmichael's composition "Skylark", the lyrics of "Baltimore Oriole" convey a love affair in terms of a bird–in this case the Baltimore oriole. In the description of his biographer Richard Sudhalter, the song is "one of Carmichael's most evocative of the time" and addresses "the effects of a wayward eye on an avian love relationship". The song was one of three Carmichael compositions due to be featured in the 1944 film To Have and Have Not, starring Humphrey Bogart, Carmichael and Lauren Bacall. According to Bacall, Howard Hawks, the film's director, envisioned the song becoming her signature tune. Instead, Bacall sang the less vocally demanding "How Little We Know", and "Baltimore Oriole" was relegated to serving as background music in the film. Carmichael recorded the song for his 1956 album Hoagy Sings Carmichael and again for his final album, Ole Buttermilk Sky.

Australian composer Andrew Ford, writing for The Sydney Morning Herald in 2002, said that "Baltimore Oriole" was his personal favorite of Carmichael's songs. Regarding the lyrics, he added: "I am delighted to report ... [that] my favourite line turns out to be by Hoagy himself: 'Forgivin' is easy, it's a woman-like now-and-then-could-happen-to thing.'"

A jazz instrumental version was released in 1964 by Maynard Ferguson on The Blues Roar.

A lifelong fan of Carmichael, George Harrison covered the song and Carmichael's "Hong Kong Blues" on his 1981 album Somewhere in England. In 2007, Rachel Gould and Luigi Tessarollo included "Baltimore Oriole" among the ten Carmichael songs on their album Tribute to Hoagy Carmichael.

== Sources ==
- Leng, Simon (2006). While My Guitar Gently Weeps: The Music of George Harrison. Milwaukee, WI: Hal Leonard. ISBN 1-4234-0609-5.
