= Ray Cooper =

English percussionist (born 1947)

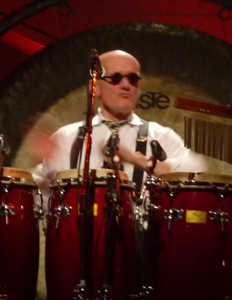
- Cooper on tour with Elton John in January 2010 at a concert in Hawaii

Background information
- Born: 19 September 1947 (age 79); Watford, Hertfordshire, England
- Genre: Rock
- Occupation: Musician
- Instrument: Percussion
- Years active: 1960s–present

Raymond Cooper (born 19 September 1947) is an English musician who has worked as a session and road-tour percussionist. During his career, Cooper has worked and toured with numerous musically diverse bands and artists including Elton John (as a duo and as a member of his band), Harry Nilsson, Billy Joel, George Harrison, Paul McCartney, Ringo Starr, Pink Floyd, the Rolling Stones, Eric Clapton, Mark Knopfler, David Gilmour, Roger Waters and Art Garfunkel. Cooper absorbed the influence of rock drummers from the 1960s and 1970s such as Ginger Baker, Carmine Appice and John Bonham.

Incorporation of unusual instruments for rock drummers of the time such as cowbells, glockenspiel and tubular bells, along with several standard kit elements, helped create a highly varied setup.

== Early life ==
Cooper was born in Watford, Hertfordshire. In addition to percussion, Cooper studied classical piano, strings and woodwind, as well as theatre.

== Career ==
Cooper later joined the band Blue Mink, and as a session musician he played on records for artists such as America, Carly Simon and David Essex. He played on and co-produced the album Somewhere in England by George Harrison in 1981.

Cooper has long been associated with Elton John's career, playing on more than 90 recordings, and performing in more than 800 concerts with John both as a duo and in the Elton John Band. His first appearance with John was during the sessions for Madman Across the Water, and he played his first live show with him in early 1972. Cooper had a short stint with the Rolling Stones, playing percussion for their 1974 It's Only Rock 'n Roll album. After contributing to various Elton John albums, Cooper joined the Elton John Band full-time in 1974 and spent the next two years recording and touring with the group.

During John's semi-retirement in the late 1970s, Cooper played on various singles and albums for John, and recorded with George Harrison, the Kinks, Wings and Art Garfunkel. In 1977 and again in 1979, Cooper toured with Elton John as a duo in which John would play a solo set and then be joined by Cooper on percussion for the second half of the concerts.

Cooper's relationship with the Rolling Stones continued into the 1980s. In 1981, he contributed to Bill Wyman's third solo album.

In 1983, he participated in a short tour for the Ronnie Lane ARMS Charity Concert along with Eric Clapton, Jimmy Page, Jeff Beck and other artists, including Bill Wyman and Charlie Watts.

In the early 80s he also played in "Il tuffatore" (The diver) and "Marco Polo", two concept albums of an Italian indie songwriter, Flavio Giurato.

Throughout the decade Cooper continued to record and tour periodically with Elton John. In 1986, he joined John's touring band for the Tour De Force tour concerts in Australia with the Melbourne Symphony Orchestra, augmenting Jody Linscott, who was the band's percussionist on the rest of John's world tour.

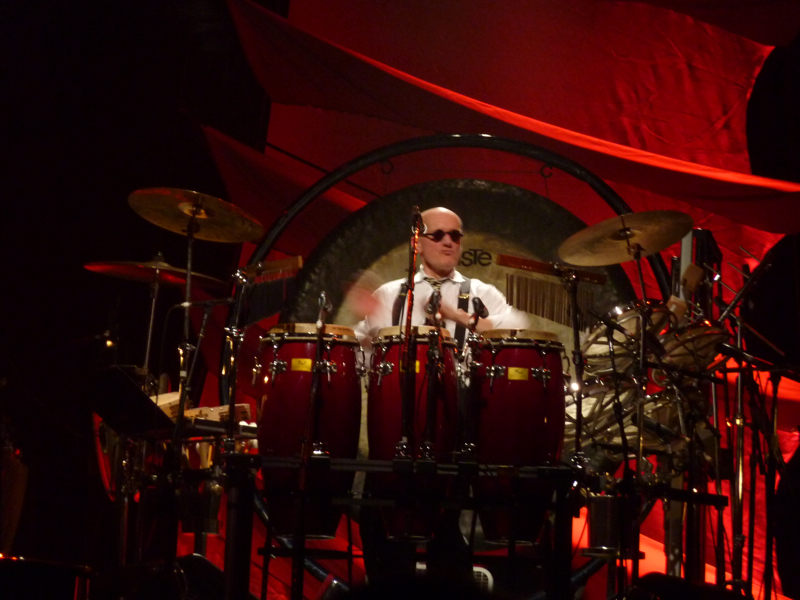
Cooper performing in 2010

Cooper showed up on Christine McVie's self-titled solo album in 1984. In 1985, Cooper appeared on both Mick Jagger's She's the Boss album and Bill Wyman's Willie & The Poor Boys. Also in 1985, Cooper performed as percussionist for a number of artists during the charity event Live Aid. In 1997, he guested with Bill Wyman's Rhythm Kings for Struttin' Our Stuff.

In every tour during 1990, Eric Clapton and the band played "Sunshine of Your Love", which then flowed into a short one-minute drum solo by Steve Ferrone (drummer for Clapton's band on the tour), then into a seven-minute percussion solo by Cooper on the tambourine, congas and gong. On 16 January 1992, he played percussion for Clapton's instalment of the MTV Unplugged television series.

During 1994 and 1995 Face to Face tours with Billy Joel, and during Elton John's tours in 1995, John played "Saturday Night's Alright for Fighting", which then flowed into a solo by Cooper on percussion. In the 1995 "Evening With Elton John and Ray Cooper" tour, the two men performed in Argentina, Brazil, Colombia, Venezuela and Costa Rica, where John performed a solo set, then was joined by Cooper on percussion for the second half of the show. On 15 September 1997, Cooper was the principal percussionist along with Phil Collins at the Music for Montserrat fund raiser concert at the Royal Albert Hall. Cooper was part of the band at the Concert for George, the memorial concert for George Harrison, held at the Royal Albert Hall in 2002. He contributed to the tribute concert for Jim Capaldi in January 2007. He worked on Katie Melua's album Pictures (2007).

== Film work ==
In the 1980s, Cooper got involved in film as a musician, actor and producer. His work in film production included work for HandMade Films, which was owned by his friend George Harrison.

Cooper has played small roles such as the preacher in Robert Altman's feature film Popeye (1980) starring Robin Williams and Shelley Duvall. He has performed music in several of Terry Gilliam's productions, appearing on-screen in quirky roles like the technician who swats the beetle at the beginning of Gilliam's 1985 film Brazil (1985), and as the functionary whispering in the ear of Jonathan Pryce's Right Ordinary Horatio Jackson character in 1989's The Adventures of Baron Munchausen. He appeared as a member of the old soldiers' band in Bullshot (1983) and in the Concert for Cascara in the 1985 film Water, as well as appearing as a street commercial for The Zero Theorem.

== Recent work ==
Cooper has continued recording and performing with Elton John on various albums and tours, including John's The Million Dollar Piano show in Las Vegas. In 2009, John and Cooper performed a small exclusive series of shows, mostly in the UK and Europe, the first time since 1995 that the two had toured together without a band.

Amongst their performances was one at the Royal Albert Hall to raise funds for a new organ which the Royal Academy of Music would assemble in their Duke's Hall. They raised further funds with a further performance at the Royal Opera House in 2011. The organ was constructed by Orgelbau Kuhn and has been named the Sir Elton John and Ray Cooper Organ. It was heard for the first time on 7 October 2013. In a greeting to Cooper on his 70th birthday, John's website stated that when Elton composed the song "Tambourine" for his 2016 Wonderful Crazy Night album, he made sure to bring in Cooper to play the instrument on the track. In 2023, Cooper toured with John as part of his Farewell Yellow Brick Road farewell tour.

In February 2024 Cooper was the guest of Michael Berkeley on the BBC Radio 3 programme Private Passions.

== Discography ==
With Joan Armatrading

- Whatever's for Us (A&M Records, 1972)
- Walk Under Ladders (A&M Records, 1981)
- Sleight of Hand (A&M Records, 1986)

With America

- America (Warner Bros. Records, 1971)

With Madeline Bell

- This is One Girl (Pye Records, 1976)

With Colin Blunstone

- Planes (Epic Records, 1976)
- Never Even Thought (Epic Records, 1978)

With Teresa Brewer

- Music, Music, Music (Amsterdam, 1973)

With Chanter Sisters

- Shoulder to Shoulder (Safari, 1978)

With Roger Chapman

- Chappo (Arista Records, 1979)

With Eric Clapton

- Behind the Sun (Warner Bros. Records, 1985)

With Rosemary Clooney

- Nice to Be Around (United Artists Records, 1977)

With Kiki Dee

- Kiki Dee (Rocket, 1977)

With Donovan

- Essence to Essence (Epic Records, 1973)

With Ian Dury

- Laughter (Stiff Records, 1980)
- 4,000 Weeks' Holiday (Polydor Records, 1984)
- Apples (WEA Records, 1989)
- The Bus Driver's Prayer & Other Stories (Demon Records, 1992)

With Yvonne Elliman

- Food of Love (Purple Records, 1973)

With Cass Elliot

- The Road Is No Place for a Lady (RCA Records, 1972)

With David Essex

- Rock On (Columbia Records, 1973)
- David Essex (CBS Records, 1974)
- Imperial Wizard (Mercury Records, 1978)
- Stage - Struck (Metronome Records, 1982)
- The Whisper (Mercury Records, 1983)

With Bryan Ferry

- In Your Mind (EG Records, 1977)

With Pink Floyd

- The Final Cut (Harvest Records, 1983)

With Art Garfunkel

- Fate for Breakfast (Columbia Records, 1979)
- Scissors Cut (Columbia Records, 1981)

With Dana Gillespie

- Weren't Born a Man (MCA Records, 1973)

With David Gilmour

- About Face (Columbia Records, 1984)

With Tony Hadley

- Passing Strangers (Curb Records, 2006)
- The Mood I'm In (Revolver, 2024)

With George Harrison

- George Harrison (Dark Horse Records, 1979)
- Somewhere in England (Dark Horse Records, 1981)
- Gone Troppo (Dark Horse Records, 1982)
- Cloud Nine (Dark Horse Records, 1987)
- Brainwashed (Dark Horse Records, 2002)

With Murray Head

- Nigel Lived (CBS Records, 1972)

With Mick Jagger

- She's the Boss (Columbia Records, 1985)

With Elton John

- Madman Across the Water (Uni Records, 1971)
- Honky Château (Uni Records, 1972)
- Goodbye Yellow Brick Road (MCA Records, 1973)
- Caribou (MCA Records, 1974)
- Captain Fantastic and the Brown Dirt Cowboy (MCA Records, 1975)
- Rock of the Westies (MCA Records, 1975)
- Blue Moves (Rocket, 1976)
- A Single Man (Rocket Records, 1978)
- Too Low for Zero (Geffen, 1983)
- Reg Strikes Back (MCA Records, 1988)
- Made in England (Island Records, 1995)
- Wonderful Crazy Night (Mercury Records, 2016)

With Davey Johnstone

- Smiling Face (Rocket, 1973)

With Lulu

- Don't Take Love for Granted (The Rocket Record Company, 1979)
- Lulu (Alfa Records, 1981)

With Katie Melua

- Pictures (Dramatico, 2007)

With Paul McCartney

- Press to Play (Parlophone, 1986)

With Christine McVie

- Christine McVie (Warner Bros. Records, 1984)

With Harry Nilsson

- Son of Schmilsson (RCA Records, 1972)

With Nigel Olsson

- Nigel Olsson (The Rocket Record Company, 1975)
- Nigel Olsson (Columbia Records, 1978)
- Nigel (Bang Records, 1979)

With Roy Orbison

- Mystery Girl (Virgin Records, 1989)

With Bill Quateman

- Bill Quateman (Columbia Records, 1973)

With Chris Rea

- Chris Rea (Magnet Records, 1981)

With Cliff Richard

- Silver (EMI, 1983)

With Carly Simon

- No Secrets (Elektra Records, 1972)

With Chris Spedding

- Hurt (EMI, 1977)
- Guitar Graffiti (RAK, 1978)

With Ringo Starr

- Stop and Smell the Roses (RCA Records, 1981)
- Old Wave (RCA Records, 1983)

With Rod Stewart

- Smiler (Mercury Records, 1974)

With Sting

- The Soul Cages (A&M Records, 1991)

With The Rolling Stones

- It's Only Rock 'n Roll (Rolling Stones Records, 1974)

With Rick Wakeman

- The Six Wives of Henry VIII (A&M Records, 1973)

With Roger Waters

- The Pros and Cons of Hitch Hiking (Columbia Records, 1984)

With Bill Wyman

- Stuff (Victor Records, 1992)
