= Kamala Chakravarty =

Indian dancer, classical musician, and longterm partner of Ravi Shankar (born 1928)

Kamala Chakravarty (born Saraswati Kamala Shastri, 1928) is an Indian classical musician and former dancer, known for her association with sitar maestro Ravi Shankar. From 1967 until the late 1970s, she accompanied Shankar, in the role of tanpura player and singer, in a number of acclaimed performances, including the Monterey International Pop Festival (1967), his Human Rights Day duet with violinist Yehudi Menuhin (1967), the Concert for Bangladesh (1971) and the Music Festival from India (1974). She lived with Shankar as his "wife" from 1967 to 1981, while he was still married to musician and teacher Annapurna Devi.

While in her teens, Chakravarty trained and performed with Uday Shankar's dance company. She is the younger sister of noted Hindustani classical vocalist Lakshmi Shankar. She was married to Bombay film director Amiya Chakravarty from 1945 until Amiya's death in 1957.

== Biography ==
=== Early years and participation in Uday Shankar's dance company ===
Kamala Chakravarty was born in Madras, south India, in 1928. Her father was R.V. Shastri, editor of Mahatma Gandhi's reformist newspaper Harijan. Along with her elder sister, Lakshmi Shastri, she studied at dance pioneer Uday Shankar's India Culture Centre, an academy based at Almora, in the remote north Indian state of Uttarakhand. Her teachers in the various classical dance traditions included Sankaran Namboodri (for Kathakali), Kandappan Pillai (Bharata Natyam) and Amobi Sinha (Manipuri).

At Almora in 1941, Chakravarty attended the wedding of Lakshmi, then aged fifteen, to Uday's brother Rajendra, where she met the youngest of the Shankar brothers, the future sitar virtuoso Ravi Shankar. The latter recalls in his second autobiography, Raga Mala (1997), that Chakravarty was known as Saraswati Shastri at this time and only later began using Kamala as her first name.

=== Bombay and marriage to Amiya Chakravarty ===
The economic effects of World War II forced the academy's closure in 1944, after which Chakravarty moved to Calcutta and then joined her sister and brothers-in-law in Malad, near Bombay. There, Rajendra worked as a scriptwriter, and Ravi tried to establish himself as a musician and composer. In 2012, The Times of India wrote of Ravi Shankar, his wife Annapurna Devi and the Shastri sisters as "more or less contemporaries with a burning interest in music and dance".

A physical attraction grew between Shankar and Chakravarty, causing his family to hastily arrange a marriage between her and Bombay film director Amiya Chakravarty. After the wedding in September 1945, Chakravarty's professional ambitions were sidelined, while Shankar relocated to Andheri.

=== International years with Ravi Shankar ===
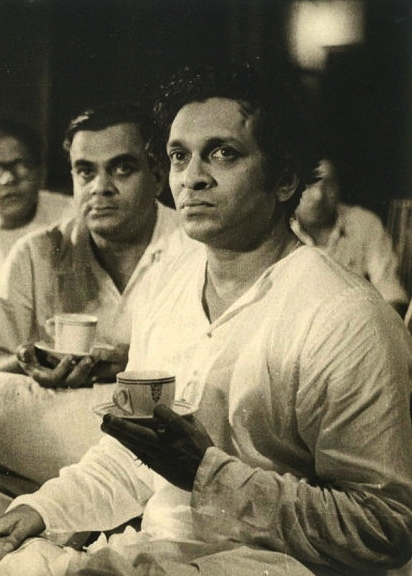
Chakravarty's longtime romantic partner Ravi Shankar, pictured in Bombay during the recording of his score for the 1955 film Pather Panchali

Following Amiya Chakravarty's death in 1957, Shankar and Chakravarty renewed their relationship. She helped run his Kinnara School of Music from 1963 onwards, and after Shankar left Devi in 1967, they lived together until 1981, for much of the time in the United States.

Chakravarty accompanied Shankar, on tanpura or as a singer, on several of his recordings and international performances. These included his warmly received set with tabla player Alla Rakha at the Monterey International Pop Festival, in June 1967, the live album from which remains Shankar's highest-charting work on the Billboard pop albums chart. In December that year, she and Rakha accompanied Shankar and American violinist Yehudi Menuhin during their Human Rights Day duet in New York, which was the first recital of Indian classical music to be broadcast globally. Chakravarty subsequently contributed to the recording of the same piece, "Raga Piloo", for Menuhin and Shankar's album West Meets East, Volume 2 (1968).

Also over 1967–68, she participated in filming for the Raga documentary (1971), appearing in footage of Shankar's performances from the period and as his companion in off-stage scenes filmed at the Monterey festival and (with Lakshmi) at the Los Angeles branch of his Kinnara School. Among other Shankar albums, she plays tambura on In San Francisco (1967) and Transmigration Macabre (1973), a soundtrack recorded in 1968 with French experimental percussionists Les Structures Sonores for the art film Viola. Later in 1968, she, Lakshmi and Jitendra Abhisheki were the singers in Shankar's Festival from India ensemble, which recorded an eponymous double album in Los Angeles before touring the United States.

In August 1971, Chakravarty accompanied Shankar, sarod master Ali Akbar Khan and Rakha at the Concert for Bangladesh, held at New York's Madison Square Garden. The success of the resulting live album and concert film gained Indian music its largest audience up to that point. Although she provided a minor role in the performance, as the tambura player, George Harrison's introduction of Chakravarty to the New York audience ensured that her name became linked to the event.

In 1973, Chakravarty was among the chorus singers at the Los Angeles sessions for Shankar's genre-fusing album Shankar Family & Friends (1974). The album was produced by Harrison and featured Lakshmi as lead vocalist and Shubho Shankar (Shankar's son by Devi) on sitar. In 1974, Chakravarty, Lakshmi and the latter's daughter Viji performed in Europe as part of Ravi Shankar's Music Festival from India, the first Indian orchestra to play in Europe. Her contributions, on tambura and as a backing singer, also appeared on the Music Festival's studio album, recorded in England at Harrison's Friar Park and released in 1976. That same year, Chakravarty participated in the recording of the third volume of Shankar and Menuhin's West Meets East series, issued in 1977. The album included "Morning Love", featuring Shankar and French flautist Jean-Pierre Rampal backed by Rakha and Chakravarty – a piece that Shankar later named as a favourite among his various collaborative works.

=== Subsequent relationship with the Shankar family ===
By the time that Annapoorna finally granted Shankar a divorce in 1982, he and Chakravarty had split up. Having nursed Uday in the weeks before his death in September 1977 and similarly cared for Shubho after the latter had attempted suicide in 1970, she remained a close friend of the musician's extended family. According to Shankar in Raga Mala, Chakravarty accepted and was welcoming towards his second wife, Sukanya, and their daughter, Anoushka.

== Sources ==
- Harry Castleman & Walter J. Podrazik, All Together Now: The First Complete Beatles Discography 1961–1975, Ballantine Books (New York, NY, 1976; ISBN 0-345-25680-8).
- Collaborations, book accompanying Ravi Shankar–George Harrison Collaborations box set (Dark Horse Records, 2010; produced by Olivia Harrison; package design by Drew Lorimer & Olivia Harrison).
- In Celebration, booklet accompanying Ravi Shankar: In Celebration box set (Angel/Dark Horse, 1995; produced by George Harrison & Alan Kozlowski; package design by Rick Ward/The Team Design Consultants).
- Peter Lavezzoli, The Dawn of Indian Music in the West, Continuum (New York, NY, 2006; ISBN 0-8264-2819-3).
- Simon Leng, While My Guitar Gently Weeps: The Music of George Harrison, Hal Leonard (Milwaukee, WI, 2006; ISBN 1-4234-0609-5).
- Reginald Massey, India's Dances: Their History, Technique, and Repertoire, Abhinav Publications (New Delhi, NCT, 2004; ISBN 81-7017-434-1).
- Ravi Shankar, My Music, My Life, Mandala Publishing (San Rafael, CA, 2007; ISBN 978-1-60109-005-8).
- Ravi Shankar, Raga Mala: The Autobiography of Ravi Shankar, Welcome Rain (New York, NY, 1999; ISBN 1-56649-104-5).
- World Music: The Rough Guide (Volume 2: Latin and North America, Caribbean, India, Asia and Pacific), Rough Guides/Penguin (London, 2000; ISBN 1-85828-636-0).
