= East Meets West =

East Meets West may refer to:

== Film and television ==
- East Meets West (1936 film), a British film
- East Meets West (1995 film), a Japanese film
- East Meets West (2011 film), a Hong Kong film
- East Meets West (TV series), a cooking show on the Food Network
- "East Meets West", the first five episodes of Ninja Turtles: The Next Mutation

== Music ==
- East Meets West Music, the record label of the Ravi Shankar Foundation
- East Meets West (Ahmed Abdul-Malik album), 1960
- East Meets West (John Scofield album), 1977
- "East Meets West", a song by Frankie Valli and the Four Seasons and the Beach Boys, 1984
- "East Meets West", a song by Sam and the Womp, 2016

== Other uses ==
- East Meets West (non-governmental organization), a U.S.-based medical and health charity operating in Asia and Africa
- East Meets West, a podcast by Roger Chang and Tom Merritt

== See also ==
- West Meets East, 1967 studio album by Yehudi Menuhin and Ravi Shankar
- West Meets East, Volume 2, 1968 studio album by Yehudi Menuhin and Ravi Shankar
