= Concerto for Sitar & Orchestra =

1971 studio album by Ravi Shankar with the London Symphony Orchestra

Studio album by Ravi Shankar with the London Symphony Orchestra conducted by André Previn
- Released: November 1971
- Recorded: January 1971
- Studio: EMI, London
- Genre: Indian classical
- Length: 39:53
- Label: His Master's Voice (UK), Angel Records (US)
- Producer: Christopher Bishop

Concerto for Sitar & Orchestra is a studio album by Indian musician and composer Ravi Shankar with the London Symphony Orchestra (LSO) conducted by André Previn. The concerto was premiered at London's Royal Festival Hall on 28 January 1971, and subsequently released in Britain and America.

== Composition and recording ==
Ravi Shankar began composing the work, his first concerto, after receiving a commission from the LSO in mid November 1970. The idea of creating an Indian classical work for a full Western orchestra, accompanied by his sitar, appealed to Shankar following his forays into chamber music with violinist Yehudi Menuhin – issued on West Meets East (1967) and West Meets East, Volume 2 (1968).

He dedicated the concerto to his music guru (teacher) Allauddin Khan, who was in poor health at the time. Khan's composition Raga Manj Khamaj was one of the four ragas that Shankar adapted for the project. The album was produced by Christopher Bishop and recorded at EMI Studios (now Abbey Road Studios) in London.

== Release and reception ==
Concerto for Sitar & Orchestra was released in 1971 on the EMI-owned record labels His Master's Voice and Angel, in Britain and America, respectively. The US release took place in November 1971 and coincided with the world premiere of Shankar's autobiographical film Raga.

The album received acclaim from some reviewers. In America, the LP cover carried a quote from The Guardian's music critic, Edward Greenfield, that read: "If East has to meet West, then few musicians have achieved it with such open joy as Ravi Shankar." According to author Peter Lavezzoli, however, other critics considered it to be "a bastardization of two distinct forms of music".

The album peaked at number 6 on the Billboard Best Selling Classical LP's chart in February 1972. In November that year, EMI's US affiliate, Capitol Records, described the commercial performance of the album as the company's "biggest surprise" of 1972, adding that it had "sold like a pop record".

== Aftermath and legacy ==
The LSO project led to further collaborations between Shankar and Western classical musicians, such as Zubin Mehta, who conducted his concerto Raga Mala in 1981.

The second and third movements – based on the ragas Sindhi Bhairavi and Adana – were included on the four-disc box set Ravi Shankar: In Celebration (1996).

In addition to performances by Shankar, the concerto has been performed in concert by his daughter Anoushka Shankar.

== Track listing ==
All selections adapted by Ravi Shankar.

Side one

1. "1st Movement: Rāga Khamāj" – 14:23
2. "2nd Movement: Rāga Sindhi Bhairavi" – 6:19

Side two

3. "3rd Movement: Rāga Adanā" – 3:37
4. "4th Movement: Rāga Mānj Khamāj" – 15:34

== Personnel ==
- Ravi Shankar – sitar
- André Previn – orchestral direction
- Terence Emery – bongos
- London Symphony Orchestra – strings, brass and woodwinds

== Sources ==
- Lavezzoli, Peter (2006). The Dawn of Indian Music in the West. New York, NY: Continuum. ISBN 0-8264-2819-3.
- Shankar, Ravi (1999). Raga Mala: The Autobiography of Ravi Shankar. New York, NY: Welcome Rain. ISBN 1-56649-104-5.
- World Music: The Rough Guide (Volume 2: Latin and North America, Caribbean, India, Asia and Pacific) (2000). London: Rough Guides/Penguin. ISBN 1-85828-636-0.
