= In San Francisco =

Live album by Ravi Shankar
- Released: 1967 (LP); September 11, 2001 (CD)
- Venue: San Francisco, California
- Genre: Hindustani classical music
- Label: World Pacific (LP); Angel (CD)
- Producer: Richard Bock

Ravi Shankar chronology
West Meets East (1967)	In San Francisco (1967)	Live: Ravi Shankar at the Monterey International Pop Festival (1967)

Professional ratings
Review scores
Source	Rating
AllMusic	4/5 stars
Encyclopedia of Popular Music	3/5 stars
Music Story	4.5/5 stars

In San Francisco is a live album by Hindustani classical musician Ravi Shankar. It was released in 1967 on vinyl. It was later digitally remastered and released in CD format through Angel Records.

== Track listing ==
1. "Raga Bhupal Todi - Tala Ardha Jaital" (Live) – 16:50
2. "Spoken Introduction by Ravi Shankar (Part 1)" – 0:23
3. "Tabla Solo in Shikhar Tal" (Live) – 7:14
4. "Spoken Introduction by Ravi Shankar (Part 2)" – 1:02
5. "Dhun: Tala Dadra" (Live) – 24:47
