= Hiren Roy =

Indian sitar maker

Hiren Roy (1920–1992) was for many years considered to be the best sitar maker in India. Many great musicians, including Nikhil Banerjee, Vilayat Khan, Annapurna Devi, and Ravi Shankar, have sworn by his creations.

== Early life ==
Born in Bengal, India (in the part of the province which later became Bangladesh) in 1920, Roy went to Kolkata at the age of 12 to learn the art of sitar playing. However, he didn't have money enough to buy his own instrument and pay for his lessons, so he took a job in the instrument shop of Yogesh Chandra Chakraborty. He started making his own sitars and soon found that local musicians praised his work.

== Career ==
Roy started his own shop in 1942 and spent his whole life researching the various aspects of sound, design, and composition as they impacted the sitar. His brief studies in different styles of playing gave him not only a craftsman's eye for the making of a sitar, but also a player's ear for its sound, and he quickly developed original avenues in terms of look and tonal quality. For instance, he made the tabli (wooden cover on top of the gourd) and the Dandi (the neck) strong enough to withstand heavier strokes and tapings on thicker strings, thus making it more appropriate for meend (bending), an essential element of Hindustani classical music.

== Honors ==
For his lifetime achievements, Roy was honoured in 1971 by the cultural forum called "Nikkon" in Kolkata. In the 1980s, he was selected by Vishwabharati University as a member of their interview board.

Roy died in December 1992, but his tradition has been carried on by his sons. Oldest son Himangshu ran the business until his own early demise in 1997. Fourth son Amit pursued a career as a sitarist, leaving the shop to now be run by third son Barun. Like his father a musician and an innovator, Barun has won praise from great musicians for maintaining the family quality and also adapting to changing times. The Hiren Roy shop also produces other Indian instruments, including the surbahar and tanpura.

== See also ==
- Sitar
- Tanpura
- Surbahar
- Indian musical instruments
- Vilayat Khan
- Ravi Shankar
