= West Meets East, Volume 2 =

Studio album by Yehudi Menuhin and Ravi Shankar
- Released: 15 July 1968
- Recorded: 1967–68; Angel Records, New York City
- Genre: Indian classical
- Length: 1:03:34
- Label: His Master's Voice (UK), Angel Records (US)

Yehudi Menuhin and Ravi Shankar chronology
West Meets East (1967)	West Meets East, Volume 2 (1968)	West Meets East, Volume 3 (1976)

Professional ratings
Review scores
Source	Rating
AllMusic	4.5/5 stars

West Meets East, Volume 2 is an album by American violinist Yehudi Menuhin and Indian sitar virtuoso Ravi Shankar, released in 1968. It is the second album in a trilogy of collaborations between the two artists, after the Grammy Award-winning West Meets East (1967).

The release followed Menuhin and Shankar's duet on 10 December 1967 at the United Nations in New York, celebrating the twentieth anniversary of the Universal Declaration of Human Rights. As part of his utopian ideal, international human rights was a cause long supported by Menuhin in his work, while for Indian classical music, this Human Rights Day recital marked the first time that a performance had received a worldwide television broadcast.

Reflecting the celebrity status afforded the sitarist during this period, particularly as a result of his association with George Harrison of the Beatles, Shankar's activities were filmed for a documentary on his life, released as Raga in 1971, and his autobiography My Music, My Life (1968) became a bestseller. Although West Meets East, Volume 2 was another popular success for Menuhin and Shankar, their work together drew further criticism from purists in India, who considered that Shankar was westernising and thus diluting Indian classical music.

== Recording and musical content ==
The follow-up to West Meets East was announced in February 1968, when Billboard magazine reported that Menuhin and Shankar had been recording new material together at Angel Records' New York studios. While their first album continued to top that magazine's Best Selling Classical LP's listings, Shankar had also achieved mainstream success with the recently released Live: Ravi Shankar at the Monterey International Pop Festival, which peaked at number 43 on the Billboard Top LP's chart – the highest US chart placing he would achieve throughout his career. Angel released the new Menuhin–Shankar set on 15 July that year. The album peaked at number 3 on the Classical LP's listings.

West Meets East, Volume 2 contains a version of the piece played at the United Nations, an interpretation of Raga Piloo. According to Shankar's comments in a March 1968 issue of Rolling Stone magazine, they recorded this selection "just a few days ago". As at the recital, Menuhin and Shankar were accompanied by Alla Rakha on tabla and Kamala Chakravarty, Shankar's female companion, on tambura. The second piece is "Raga Ananda Bhairava", performed by Shankar with his regular accompanist and instrument-maker, Nodu Mullick, on tambura, and Rakha again on tabla.

Side two in the original LP format consists of Menuhin and his sister Hephzibah performing Bartók's Sonata No. 1 for Violin and Piano.

== Track listing ==
All selections by Ravi Shankar except where noted.

Side one

1. "Raga Piloo" – 14:44
2. "Raga Ananda Bhairava" – 15:37

Side two

3. "Sonata for Violin & Piano No. 1" (Béla Bartók) – 33:13

== Personnel ==
- Yehudi Menuhin – violin
- Ravi Shankar – sitar
- Alla Rakha – tabla
- Hephzibah Menuhin – piano
- N.C. Mullick – tambura
- Kamala Chakravarty – tambura

== See also ==
- Hindustani music

== Sources ==
- Peter Lavezzoli, The Dawn of Indian Music in the West, Continuum (New York, NY, 2006; ISBN 0-8264-2819-3).
- Reginald Massey, The Music of India, Abhinav Publications (New Delhi, NCT, 1996; ISBN 81-7017-332-9).
- Ravi Shankar, My Music, My Life, Mandala Publishing (San Rafael, CA, 2007; ISBN 978-1-60109-005-8).
- Ravi Shankar, Raga Mala: The Autobiography of Ravi Shankar, Welcome Rain (New York, NY, 1999; ISBN 1-56649-104-5).
- World Music: The Rough Guide (Volume 2: Latin and North America, Caribbean, India, Asia and Pacific), Rough Guides/Penguin (London, 2000; ISBN 1-85828-636-0).
