= Raga (film) =

- Theatrical release poster
- Directed by: Howard Worth
- Written by: Nancy Bacal
- Produced by: Howard Worth
- Starring: Ravi Shankar; Allauddin Khan; Yehudi Menuhin; George Harrison; Alla Rakha; Kamala Chakravarty; Lakshmi Shankar
- Cinematography: James Allen
- Edited by: Merle Worth
- Music by: Ravi Shankar
- Production company: Apple Films
- Distributed by: Apple Films
- Release date: 23 November 1971
- Running time: 97 minutes
- Country: United States
- Languages: English; Hindi

Raga is a 1971 documentary film about the life and music of Indian sitarist Ravi Shankar, produced and directed by Howard Worth. It includes scenes featuring Western musicians Yehudi Menuhin and George Harrison, as well as footage of Shankar returning to Maihar in central India, where as a young man he trained under the mentorship of Allauddin Khan. The film also features a portion of Shankar and tabla player Alla Rakha's acclaimed performance at the 1967 Monterey Pop Festival.

The majority of the documentary was shot in the late 1960s, during a period when Shankar's growing popularity saw Indian classical music embraced by rock and pop musicians and their audiences. Financial problems then delayed production until Harrison provided assistance through the Beatles' company Apple Films. In addition to actively promoting Raga, Harrison produced the soundtrack album – a project that led directly to Harrison and Shankar staging the Concert for Bangladesh in August 1971.

The film's working title was alternately East Meets West and Messenger Out of the East. In 2010, to coincide with celebrations for Shankar's 90th birthday, East Meets West Music released a fully remastered version on DVD, titled Raga: A Film Journey into the Soul of India. The expanded soundtrack album was also made available, via digital download.

== Production ==
New York film-maker Howard Worth began work on Raga, a documentary film on Indian classical musician Ravi Shankar, in 1967, during the height of what Shankar describes in My Music, My Life (1968), the first of his two autobiographies, as "the great sitar explosion". The latter term reflected the interest that had grown in the West for Indian music and its extended works, known as ragas, over 1966–67, following the Beatles and other rock bands' adoption of the multi-stringed sitar into their sound. Aided by his befriending George Harrison of the Beatles, this phenomenon resulted in Shankar achieving pop star status. Music critic Ken Hunt describes him as having become "the most famous Indian musician on the planet" in 1966. (Note: Hunt adds that within "two decades" of Shankar's debut performances in Western Europe and America, in 1956, he was "probably the most famous Indian alive".) Shankar was uncomfortable with this development, since his training had instilled in him a sacred purpose for India's musical heritage – namely, Nada Brahma ("Sound is God"). The film documents Shankar's concern that while old traditions were dying in India, they were simultaneously being misappropriated by America's youth culture, particularly through many in the West choosing to associate Indian classical music with psychedelic drugs.

Speaking in 2010 of his involvement in Raga, Worth recalled that he disliked Indian music initially, but soon changed his view. At the request of Canadian television producer Nancy Bacal, he attended a private recital by Shankar, in the company of singers Judy Collins and Leonard Cohen, a performance that convinced Worth that he wanted to direct the planned Shankar documentary after all. Worth also served as producer, and he and Bacal worked on a script at Collins's house in California.

The film was originally called East Meets West, according to author Peter Lavezzoli; Messenger Out of the East was an alternative working title. The first of these titles referenced West Meets East, Shankar's 1966 album with American violinist Yehudi Menuhin, and the winner of the 1967 Grammy Award for Best Chamber Music Performance.

=== Filming ===
To be received like this in a foreign land – my God, it is overwhelming. I never felt so much warmth and openness, so much love for our music ... But I wonder how much they can understand, and where all this will lead to.

— Shankar's opening narrative in Raga

Much of Raga was shot during the first half of 1968 in India, particularly Bombay, home to Shankar's Kinnara School of Music since 1963. Among the scenes filmed in India, Shankar directs musicians such as Shivkumar Sharma, Hariprasad Chaurasia and Kartick Kumar in a Bombay studio and, in a scene titled "Vinus House", enjoys a casual musical get-together with singer Vinay Bharat Ram and violinist Satyadev Pawar.

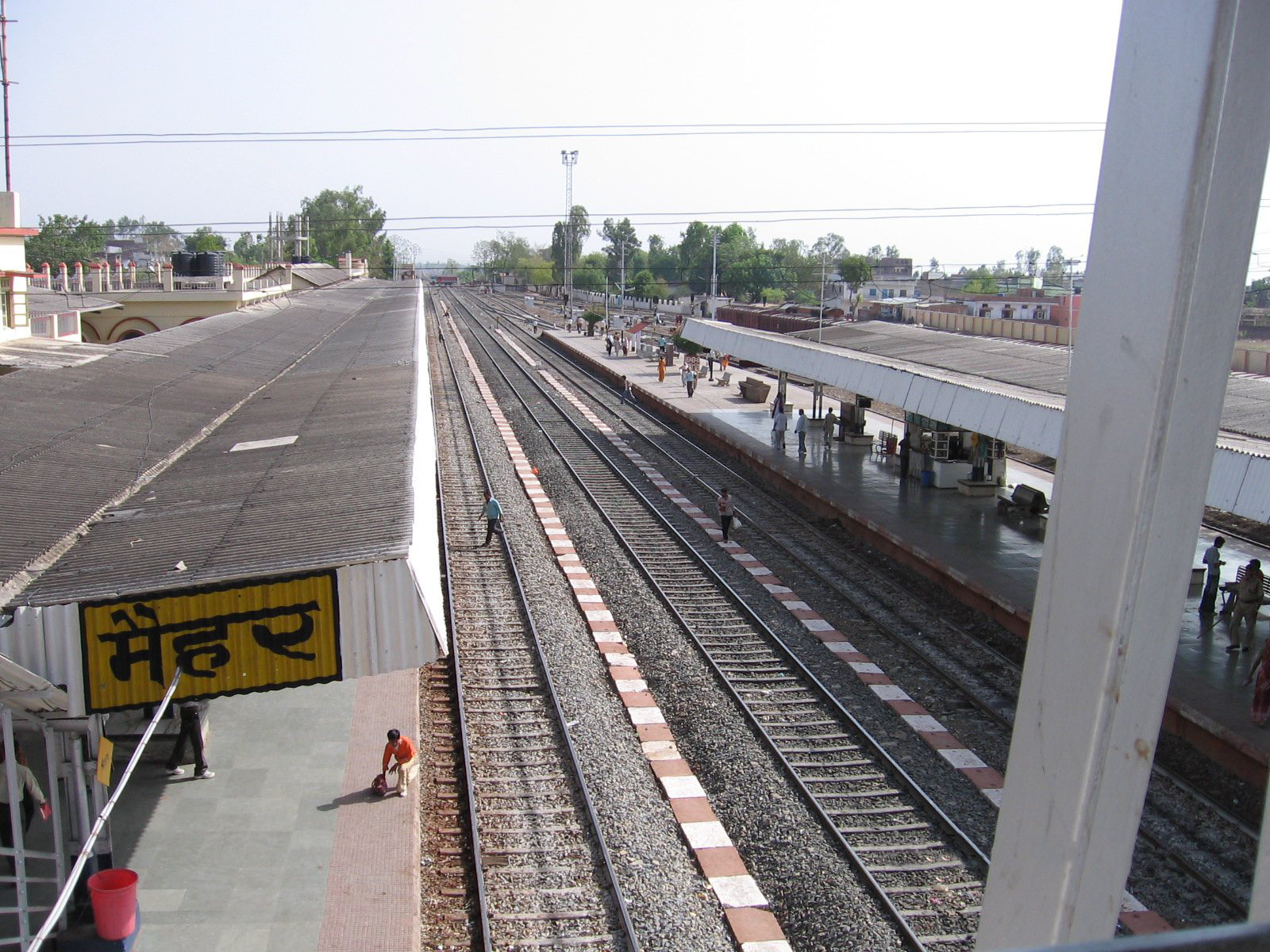
Maihar Railway Station in 2009. In Raga, Shankar journeys by train to Maihar as part of his reaffirmation of his cultural roots.

Early in the film, Shankar travels by train to the Madhya Pradesh town of Maihar, to see his father-in-law and esteemed music teacher (or guru), Allauddin Khan, known affectionately as "Baba". Worth recalls this visit as a nervous occasion for Shankar, who states in his role as narrator: "Whenever I think of [Baba], I have a mixture of fear and awe. For us, guru is sometimes greater even than God." (Note: In his 1997 autobiography, Raga Mala, Shankar comments on the difficult relationship he had with his father-in-law, due to longstanding marital problems between himself and Baba's daughter, Annapurna Devi.) Another scene features dancers from the South Indian kathakali tradition, reflecting Shankar's early career as a dancer with elder brother Uday's pioneering troupe during the 1930s.

According to Worth, the emotional highpoint of filming was when Shankar visited his spiritual guru, named Tat Baba. In his own teaching activities, Shankar is shown mentoring students at Kinnara, adhering to the strict guru-shishya tradition he had experienced under Allauddin Khan. Shankar later reflects on the comparative rush to master the intricacies of Indian music by his Western students in Los Angeles, where he opened a branch of the Kinnara School in May 1967.

Raga includes footage of a pair of celebrated live performances by Shankar from 1967, a year that Lavezzoli describes as the "annus mirabilis" for Indian music in the West. The first performance was from the Monterey Pop Festival in northern California on 18 June, where Shankar was accompanied by his longtime tabla player, Alla Rakha. The film shows Shankar and his companion Kamala Chakravarty circulating among the crowd before his performance, and American musicians Jerry Garcia and Jimi Hendrix among "the enthralled spectators" while he plays, according to Lavezzoli. The second of these 1967 performances, a recital featuring Menuhin and Shankar, was filmed six months later on Human Rights Day, at the United Nations building in New York. (Note: This event took place on 10 December 1967 and included accompaniment from Rakha and Chakravarty (the latter on tambura). Adding to its significance, the Human Rights Day recital was the first time that Indian classical musicians had been seen by a global television audience.)

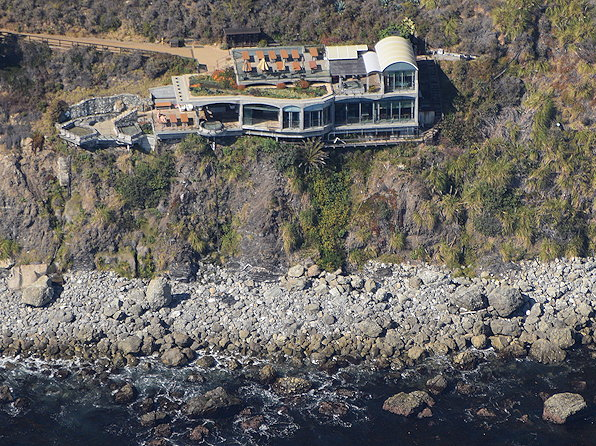
Shankar's scenes with George Harrison were filmed at the Esalen Institute in California.

Another milestone for the popularity of Indian music was the June 1967 release of the Beatles' Sgt. Pepper's Lonely Hearts Club Band album, the "spiritual centerpiece" of which, Lavezzoli writes, was George Harrison's Indian composition "Within You, Without You". Harrison joined Shankar in Madras in April 1968, following the Beatles' stay at Maharishi Mahesh Yogi's meditation ashram in Rishikesh, but a bout of dysentery prevented him from participating in filming for Raga. Worth subsequently filmed Harrison's contributions at the Esalen Institute in Big Sur, California, on 10–11 June 1968. In one of the scenes, Harrison receives sitar tuition from Shankar; in another, they both participate in a singing class with students from Kinnara. While his immersion in Indian music had been the most significant factor behind Shankar's recent rise to international fame, Harrison would later cite this visit to Esalen as presaging the end of his commitment to the sitar. (Note: Part of Harrison's reason for abandoning the sitar was his realisation that mastering the instrument demanded years of intense dedication. In his 1980 autobiography, Harrison explains: "By this time I had met a few hundred sitar players who were all sensational, yet Ravi had hopes for only one of them that he would be a really great sitar player.) As of 2006, the scene in Raga featuring Shankar instructing Harrison was the only known film footage of Harrison playing the sitar during his years as a member of the Beatles.

California was also the location for the film's penultimate scene, in which Shankar, looking out over a windswept beach, questions the validity of his attempts to bring Indian culture to America. In his narration for the scene, he reads out a passage adapted from My Music, My Life, reaffirming his belief in Nada Brahma.

=== Apple Films' involvement ===
After the main filming over 1967–68 in India and the United States, financial and technical problems interrupted production on Raga. According to Worth's recollection, the original financier for the project, whom he describes as "Ravi's manager", was forced to back out, having been committed to a psychiatric ward. In Raga Mala, Shankar says that he financed the film himself, adding: "which was rather sad because it cost a large amount and I only realised this later!"

Once back in New York, Worth contacted Harrison, hoping to secure support from United Artists, the film studio responsible for the Beatles' feature films A Hard Day's Night, Help! and Yellow Submarine. Late in 1970, (Note: Worth does not give a date as such yet mentions Apple's New York office and Harrison asking him to pick his favourite of five recordings, one of which was "My Sweet Lord". Apple's New York office did not open until April 1970, and Harrison recorded "My Sweet Lord" in London in May–August 1970, before arriving in New York on 28 October with the master tapes for his All Things Must Pass album.) Harrison attended a special screening of the assembled footage and was so moved, according to Worth, that within days he offered the services of the Beatles' own Apple Films as a distributor. Worth credits Harrison with saving the production and thereby "chang[ing] my life".

== Soundtrack ==
Raga

Soundtrack album by Ravi Shankar
- Released: 7 December 1971 (US)
- Recorded: April–July 1968; June–July 1971
- Genre: Hindustani classical
- Length: 39:34
- Label: Apple
- Producer: George Harrison

The majority of Raga's musical soundtrack was recorded between April and July 1968. Aside from the recitals featured in the film, Shankar provided incidental music, the co-ordination of which was credited to his sister-in-law Lakshmi Shankar (for pieces classed as "East") and American musician Collin Walcott ("West"). (Note: Walcott studied under Shankar at Kinnara in Los Angeles. In a 2006 interview with Peter Lavezzoli, Shankar singled him out as "my first American disciple" and the most dedicated of all his students in Los Angeles – the majority of whom "were not sure of what they were really looking for" and "were mostly interested in getting stoned".) Among the notable Indian musicians contributing to the soundtrack were Bismillah Khan (shehnai), Shivkumar Sharma (santoor), Hariprasad Chaurasia (bansuri), Aashish Khan (sarod), Shankar Ghosh and Zakir Hussain (both tabla), and singer Jitendra Abhisheki. For a scene that Shankar describes in Raga Mala as "reflect[ing] all the distortions in that period – Indian music mixed up with rock, hippies and drugs", Walcott created a piece titled "Frenzy and Distortion", using "a profusion of electronic sounds".

In June and through to July 1971, Harrison, as producer, prepared the recordings for release in conjunction with the movie. While Shankar and Harrison were working in Los Angeles, news broke of the atrocities being committed by West Pakistan against the people of Bangladesh (formerly East Pakistan, and before that, East Bengal). In response to a plea for assistance from Shankar, a Bengali by birth, Harrison set about organising the Concert for Bangladesh, held at Madison Square Garden, New York, on 1 August. Work on the Raga soundtrack was completed in mid July, around the time of sessions for Shankar's Apple Records EP Joi Bangla.

== Release ==
Raga received a limited release in November 1971, solely in the United States. Harrison helped promote the film, starting with an interview for New York's WPLJ Radio, and he attended a press screening at Carnegie Hall Cinema on 22 November, along with former bandmate John Lennon and their wives. While Shankar attended the premiere there the following night, Harrison instead appeared on The Dick Cavett Show, discussing Raga and bemoaning the delay surrounding the release of the live album from the Concert for Bangladesh. (Note: The Concert for Bangladesh, featuring Shankar's performance of "Bangla Dhun" with Ali Akbar Khan and Rakha, would finally be issued in America four weeks after Raga opened.) Shankar joined him late in the show, during which Harrison also plugged Concerto for Sitar & Orchestra, Shankar's recently released collaboration with André Previn and the London Symphony Orchestra.

On 24 November, Shankar and Harrison filmed an appearance on The David Frost Show, where they again discussed the film and Harrison gave a rare demonstration on sitar. Two days later, Shankar performed at Carnegie Hall, accompanied by Rakha and Chakravarty, giving his first New York concert since the Concert for Bangladesh shows in August. Writing in The New York Times in November 1971, film critic Howard Thompson described Raga as "quietly penetrating" and "beautifully made", adding: "Everything about it is admirable."

On 7 December 1971, Apple Records released the soundtrack album (as Apple SWAO 3384) – like the film, in America only. Billboard's album reviewer commented on the packaging's "superb photo folio showing the sitarist's career" but said that, due to the fact that only portions of ragas were present, the soundtrack's "greatest attractiveness may be to those who see the movie or are Shankar collectors".

In August 1972, Harrison screened Raga for select guests at a cinema in Mayfair, London, to coincide with Shankar's upcoming appearance at Southwark Cathedral. According to a report in Record Mirror in early November 1973, the film was due to open in London later that same month.

When asked at the press conference for his and Shankar's 1974 North American tour whether the attendant publicity was likely to lead to a re-release for Raga in the US, Harrison expressed his hope that it would, but lamented that the restrictions imposed on cinema operators by film distributors were "like the way the record industry was ten years ago". He added: "If you don't work on Maggie's farm, you don't get your movie on, you know?"

== Reissue ==
Raga was released on home video in 1991, distributed by Mystic Fire Video. The Shankar-affiliated East Meets West Music (EMWMusic) remastered the film and released it on DVD in October 2010, with the new title Raga: A Film Journey into the Soul of India. The release was part of EMWMusic's celebrations for Shankar's 90th birthday. Shankar said of his reasons for reissuing the film: "It was a very special period of my life. I really want today's generation to see what it was like for me to be in such a unique and exciting position – to be the first to bridge the gap between the East and the West and to devise a new way to attract, educate, initiate and draw those in the West to the exceptional world of Indian classical music and culture."

On 1 November 2010, the film was screened at the New York headquarters of the Asia Society, which had promoted Shankar's first US appearances in 1957 and now honoured the artist with its Cultural Legacy Award. The event was introduced by composer Philip Glass and attended by Anoushka Shankar (representing her father, who was too sick to attend), along with people involved in the original production such as Worth, Gary Haber and Merle Worth. Writing in Songlines magazine, Jeff Kaliss gave the Raga DVD a five-star review and described the film as an "honest, entertaining portrait of a maestro" that was "[as] satisfying musically as it is visually". In an article on the 2015–16 Grammy Museum exhibit on Shankar, music historian Harvey Kubernik said the DVD was "recommended viewing".

In place of the 1971 promotional image for Raga, which showed a silhouette of a cow against a backdrop of a sunset, the new cover consisted of a still of Shankar playing sitar during the 1960s. This photo, taken by Canadian portrait photographer Yousuf Karsh, shows a portion of the seven-played-string model of sitar that Shankar had popularised over the more traditional six-string model favoured by musicians such as Vilayat Khan. (Note: In addition to the six or seven played strings, sitars have between nine and thirteen sympathetic strings, and the number of frets on the neck similarly varies. In My Music, My Life, Shanker recommends having twenty frets, rather than the standard nineteen.)

For the 2010 reissue, EMWMusic expanded the soundtrack album from thirteen selections to seventeen, with all recordings fully remastered. The Raga soundtrack was available via digital download with the documentary film.

== Album track listing ==
=== Original 1971 release ===
All songs by Ravi Shankar, except where noted.

Side one

1. "Dawn to Dusk" – 3:38
2. "Vedic Hymns" (PD) – 1:30
3. "Baba Teaching" (PD) – 1:08
4. "Birth to Death" – 3:10
5. "Vinus House" – 2:37
6. "Guru Bramha" – 1:10
7. "United Nations" (Shankar, Yehudi Menuhin) – 4:33

Side two

8. "Medley: Raga Parameshwari / Rangeswhari" – 4:31
9. "Banaras Ghat" – 2:45
10. "Bombay Studio" – 1:51
11. "Kinnara School" – 1:51
12. "Frenzy and Distortion" – 1:06
13. "Raga Desh" – 8:50

=== 2010 digital download version ===
1. "East/West Introductions" – 3:08
2. "Dawn to Dusk" – 3:41
3. "Vedic Hymns" – 1:36
4. "Baba Teaching" – 1:17
5. "Birth to Death" – 3:15
6. "Vinus House" – 2:41
7. "Gurur Bramha" – 1:15
8. "United Nations" – 4:41
9. "Medley: Raga Parameshwari / Raga Rangeshwari" – 2:54
10. "Banaras Ghat" – 1:49
11. "Bombay Studio" – 2:48
12. "Kinnara School" – 1:34
13. "Frenzy and Distortion" – 1:56
14. "Raga Desh" – 9:02
15. "The Spirit of the Raga" – 2:33
16. "What Is a Raga?" – 1:41
17. "The Seriousness of It" – 3:15

== Sources ==
- Keith Badman, The Beatles Diary Volume 2: After the Break-Up 1970–2001, Omnibus Press (London, 2001; ISBN 0-7119-8307-0).
- Harry Castleman & Walter J. Podrazik, All Together Now: The First Complete Beatles Discography 1961–1975, Ballantine Books (New York, NY, 1976; ISBN 0-345-25680-8).
- Alan Clayson, George Harrison, Sanctuary (London, 2003; ISBN 1-86074-489-3).
- George Harrison, I Me Mine, Chronicle Books (San Francisco, CA, 2002; ISBN 0-8118-3793-9).
- Olivia Harrison, George Harrison: Living in the Material World, Abrams (New York, NY, 2011; ISBN 978-1-4197-0220-4).
- Peter Lavezzoli, The Dawn of Indian Music in the West, Continuum (New York, NY, 2006; ISBN 0-8264-2819-3).
- Simon Leng, While My Guitar Gently Weeps: The Music of George Harrison, Hal Leonard (Milwaukee, WI, 2006; ISBN 1-4234-0609-5).
- Chip Madinger & Mark Easter, Eight Arms to Hold You: The Solo Beatles Compendium, 44.1 Productions (Chesterfield, MO, 2000; ISBN 0-615-11724-4).
- Barry Miles, The Beatles Diary Volume 1: The Beatles Years, Omnibus Press (London, 2001; ISBN 0-7119-8308-9).
- Raga: A Film Journey into the Soul of India DVD, East Meets West/Apple Films, 2010 (produced and directed by Howard Worth; reissue produced by Shyama Priya & Cat Celebrezze).
- Robert Rodriguez, Fab Four FAQ 2.0: The Beatles' Solo Years, 1970–1980, Backbeat Books (Milwaukee, WI, 2010; ISBN 978-1-4165-9093-4).
- Ravi Shankar, My Music, My Life, Mandala Publishing (San Rafael, CA, 2007; ISBN 978-1-60109-005-8).
- Ravi Shankar, Raga Mala: The Autobiography of Ravi Shankar, Welcome Rain (New York, NY, 1999; ISBN 1-56649-104-5).
- Bruce Spizer, The Beatles Solo on Apple Records, 498 Productions (New Orleans, LA, 2005; ISBN 0-9662649-5-9).
- Richie Unterberger, The Unreleased Beatles: Music & Film, Backbeat Books (San Francisco, CA, 2006; ISBN 978-0-8793-0892-6).
- World Music: The Rough Guide (Volume 2: Latin and North America, Caribbean, India, Asia and Pacific), Rough Guides/Penguin (London, 2000; ISBN 1-85828-636-0).
