= The Concert for Bangladesh (album) =

Live album by George Harrison & Friends
- Released: 20 December 1971
- Recorded: 1 August 1971
- Venues: Madison Square Garden, New York
- Genres: Rock; Hindustani classical; folk; gospel
- Length: 99:32
- Label: Apple
- Producers: George Harrison; Phil Spector

George Harrison chronology
All Things Must Pass (1970)	The Concert for Bangladesh (1971)	Living in the Material World (1973)

Alternative cover
- Cover for the 2005 remastered release

The Concert for Bangladesh (originally spelt The Concert for Bangla Desh) is a live triple album credited to "George Harrison & Friends" and released on Apple Records in December 1971 in the United States and January 1972 in the United Kingdom. The album followed the two concerts of the same name, held on 1 August 1971 at New York's Madison Square Garden, featuring Harrison, Bob Dylan, Ravi Shankar, Ali Akbar Khan, Ringo Starr, Billy Preston, Leon Russell, Eric Clapton and all members from Badfinger. The shows were a pioneering charity event, in aid of the displaced Bengali refugees of the Bangladesh Liberation War, and set the model for future multi-artist rock benefits such as Live Aid (1985) and the Concert for New York City (2001). The event brought Harrison and Starr together on a concert stage for the first time since 1966, when the Beatles retired from live performance, and represented Dylan's first major concert appearance in the U.S. in five years.

Co-produced by Phil Spector, The Concert for Bangladesh features his Wall of Sound approach in a live setting. Besides the main performers, the musicians and singers include Badfinger, Jim Horn, Klaus Voormann, Alla Rakha, Jim Keltner, Jesse Ed Davis and Claudia Lennear. Minimal post-production was carried out on the recordings, ensuring that the album was a faithful document of the event. The box set's packaging included a 64-page book containing photos from the concerts; the album cover, designed by Tom Wilkes, consisted of an image of a malnourished child sitting beside an empty food bowl. The album was delayed for three months due to protracted negotiations between Harrison and two record companies keen to protect their business interests, Capitol and Columbia/CBS.

On release, The Concert for Bangladesh was a major critical and commercial success. It topped albums charts in several countries and went on to win the Grammy Award for Album of the Year in March 1973. Together with the 1972 Apple concert film directed by Saul Swimmer, the album gained Indian classical music its largest Western audience up until that time. It was reissued in 2005, four years after Harrison's death, with revised artwork. As of 2011, sales of the album continue to benefit the George Harrison Fund for UNICEF, which raised $1.2 million for children in the Horn of Africa, in a campaign marking the album's 40th anniversary.

== Concerts ==
That whole show was a stroke of luck. I'd rehearsed some with Ringo, the horn players and the guys from Badfinger, but it was all happening so fast it's amazing we managed to get anything on tape.

— George Harrison to Musician magazine, November 1987

While in Los Angeles in June 1971, and after being made aware of the gravity of the situation in what was then known as East Pakistan by friend and musician Ravi Shankar, George Harrison set about organising two fundraising concerts at Madison Square Garden, New York, to aid the war-ravaged and disaster-stricken country. In the middle of these hurried preparations, he composed the song "Bangla Desh" in order to call further attention to the Bengalis' cause, and rush-released it as a charity single four days before the shows. The recent success of his All Things Must Pass triple album allowed Harrison to headline the all-star UNICEF benefit concerts, backed by a 24-piece band of musicians and singers, on Sunday, 1 August 1971. The shows marked the first time that Harrison and Ringo Starr had performed on stage together since the Beatles quit touring in 1966; since then, they, like Bob Dylan, had been mostly unavailable to concert audiences. In Dylan's case, it was his first appearance at a major US concert in five years, although his participation had been uncertain until he walked on for his segment midway through the afternoon show.

The concerts were highly successful in raising international awareness of the plight of the refugees – thought to number up to 10 million – and a cheque for over US$243,000 was soon sent to UNICEF for relief. The media lavished praise on Harrison as an ambassador for rock altruism; Rolling Stone magazine hailed the event as proof that "the Utopian spirit of the Sixties was still flickering". With concert recording having been carried out at Madison Square Garden by Gary Kellgren, using the Record Plant's 16-track mobile unit, Harrison intended to raise significantly more money via a live album of the event, to be issued on the Beatles' Apple Records label, followed by Apple Films' concert documentary, also to be titled The Concert for Bangladesh.

== Album preparation ==
=== Concert recordings ===
Speaking in 2011, Spector identified two problems that prolonged the live album's preparation, both of them reflective of the haste with which the concerts came together: "It was chaos [setting up at Madison Square Garden] – we had three hours to mic the band, then the audience came in, and we didn't know how to mic the audience." Rather than a standard band, this was a full Wall of Sound orchestra, as Spector re-created his Wall of Sound approach in concert. The large ensemble consisted of two drummers (Ringo Starr and Jim Keltner), two keyboard players (Billy Preston and Leon Russell), six horn players (led by Jim Horn), three electric guitarists (Harrison, Eric Clapton and Jesse Ed Davis), a trio of acoustic guitars to be "felt but not heard" (Badfinger's Pete Ham, Tom Evans and Joey Molland), the seven members of Don Nix's "Soul Choir", together with bassist Klaus Voormann and a dedicated percussion player, Mike Gibbins of Badfinger. In his review of the Concert for Bangladesh film, John Pidgeon described the scene as "a roadie's nightmare of instruments, mikes, amps and speakers".

Before the Western portion of the concerts, there were the traditionally hard-to-record Indian string instruments of Ravi Shankar and Ali Akbar Khan to amplify, together with Alla Rakha's tabla and the drone-enhancing tambura, played by Kamala Chakravarty – each offering natural musical tones so easily lost in the "cavernous Garden". An additional challenge for Kellgren had been the need to capture the dynamics of a well-paced show designed around professionally presented hit songs, rather than a loose superstar jam. (Note: To this end, Harrison had insisted that Dylan's set feature the singer's best-known composition, "Blowin' in the Wind", even though Dylan had not performed it live for eight years.)

=== Post-production ===
During his and Shankar's press conference in New York on 27 July, Harrison had stated that a live album might be ready for release within ten days of the shows. Although this estimate would turn out to be highly optimistic, the following year, in an effort to foil concert bootleggers, Elvis Presley succeeded in delivering a live album just eight days after his own, much-publicised Madison Square Garden shows.

Harrison and co-producer Phil Spector began working on the Bangladesh recordings on 2 August, and work continued there at the Record Plant for around a week. Spector later talked of them spending "six months" mixing what amounted to a total of four hours of music; Harrison later claimed to talk-show host Dick Cavett that the process took just over a month. In their book Eight Arms to Hold You, Chip Madinger and Mark Easter question the extent of Spector's involvement, citing Harrison's subsequent lauding of Kellgren's role in "capturing the performances" on 1 August, as well as the fact that Spector was "in and out of hospital" during this time, similar to his erratic attendance at the All Things Must Pass sessions in 1970.

With ongoing friendships a priority, Harrison had promised the main participants that, should things turn out badly on 1 August, they could be excluded from any album or film release. According to Madinger and Easter, he took early mixes of the concert tapes to Dylan for the latter's approval. (Note: Dylan also assisted Harrison with editing the film footage in New York.) Of all the featured performers, only Leon Russell chose to intervene, necessitating a reworking of his "Jumpin' Jack Flash/Youngblood" medley, which he apparently remixed himself. Post-production on the Madison Square Garden recordings was minimal, the known examples being Harrison's double-tracked lead vocal on the bridges of "While My Guitar Gently Weeps", and a composite edit of his opening song, "Wah-Wah", which was assembled from both the shows. In addition, it is possible that Shankar and Khan's "Bangla Dhun" was severely edited down: Harrison later described their set as having lasted 45 minutes, yet the running time on the album is under 17 minutes and in the film just 15 minutes.

The final mix down of the recordings, for album and film use, was carried out in Los Angeles in September, by A&M Studios engineers Norman Kinney and Steve Mitchell. In their joint interview for the 2005 Concert for Bangladesh Revisited documentary, Kinney and Mitchell confirm that music from both the afternoon (matinee) and evening performances was used for the concert film and live album; they also state that Spector repeatedly instructed them to increase the volume of the audience in the mixes, in a search for more "feel of the room" in the result. The second show was preferred when it came to selecting the best concert audio. The exceptions are as follows: "Wah-Wah", which starts off with the evening version but cuts to the matinee at 2:53; (Note: This edit on "Wah-Wah" is more noticeable in the Concert for Bangladesh film, due to the inclusion there of Jim Horn's sax solo, which was cut from the album.) Harrison's band introduction and "While My Guitar Gently Weeps", both sourced from the first show; and Russell's medley, which is also from the matinee on the album, but in the concert film, the audio cuts to the evening show during "Youngblood".

Harrison's geniality as a host was well represented on the recordings. As with Shankar's pre-"Bangla Dhun" address, Harrison's band introductions, with Russell and Voormann breaking into "Yellow Submarine" when Starr's name is mentioned, and his other on-stage dialogue would become as integral to the legacy of the event as the music itself.

== Record company obstruction ==
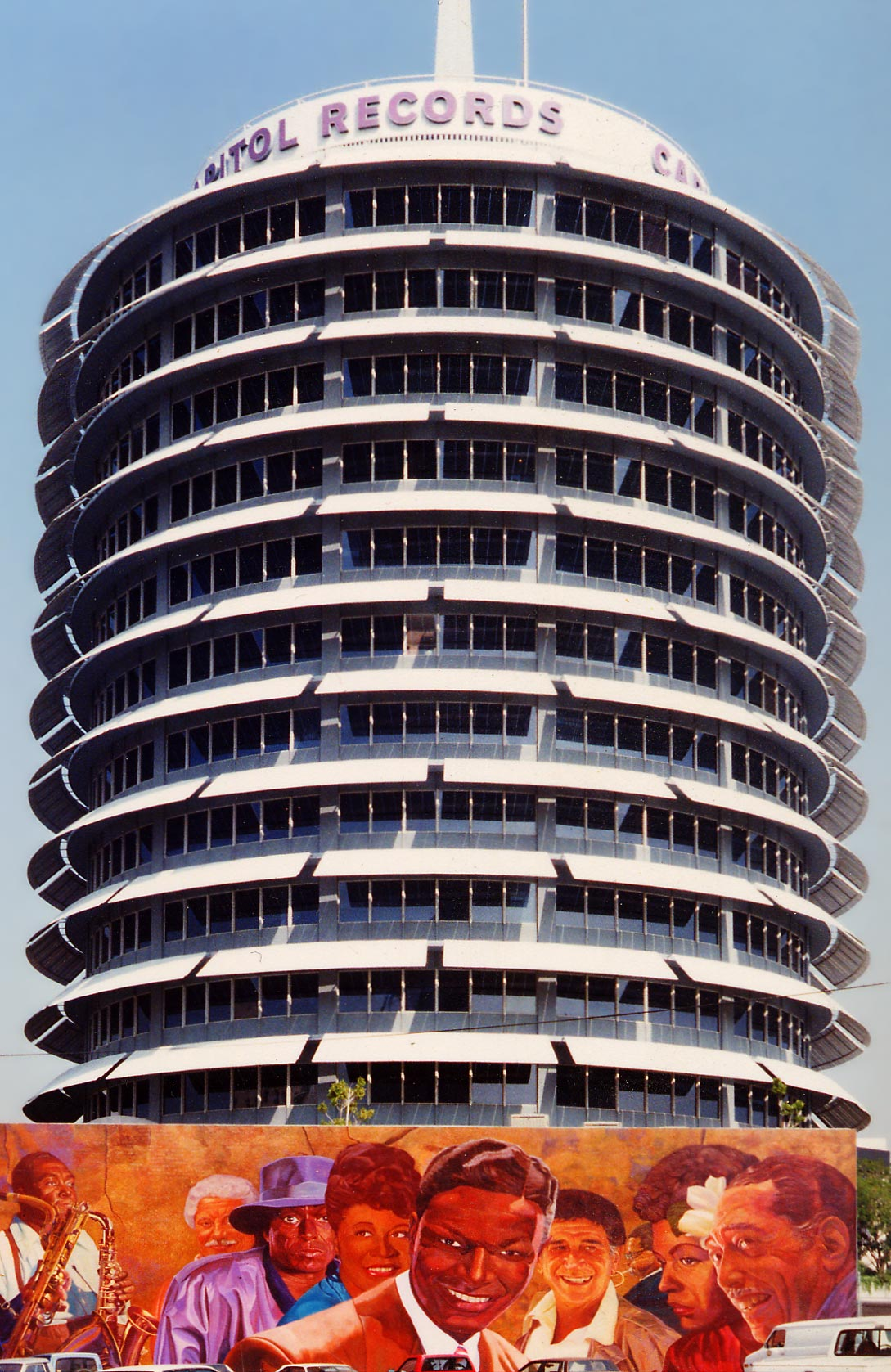
Capitol Records' headquarters, in Hollywood, California

On 23 August, press reports appeared citing "legal problems" as the reason behind the delaying of the much-anticipated live album – problems that would turn out to be a disagreement between EMI-owned Capitol Records (Apple's US distributor) and Columbia Records (Dylan's label) over who had a rightful claim to release the album. Columbia/CBS were eventually mollified with the granting of tape distribution rights in North America, and record and tape distribution in the rest of the world. Another stumbling block was Capitol's insistence that they receive monetary compensation, thought to be around $400,000, for what the company perceived to be vast production and distribution costs for the boxed three-record set. It was a position from which EMI chairman Bhaskar Menon refused to budge, while Harrison was equally adamant that, since all the artists were providing their services for free and Apple was supplying the album packaging at no charge, the record company "must give up something" also.

With the sound mix being completed in LA, Harrison spent most of September 1971 in New York working on the problematic film footage of the concert, before heading to London. There he attended the re-opening of Apple Studio on 30 September and produced new signing Lon & Derrek Van Eaton's debut single, as well as enduring a fruitless meeting with the British Treasury's financial secretary – the latter activity in an attempt to have the government waive its standard purchase tax, and so keep the album affordable to record-buyers. Harrison returned to New York on 5 October and announced that the Bangladesh live album would be issued during the following month. At this time, with concert bootlegs now on the market, posters were placed in record shops bearing the slogan: "Save a starving child. Don't buy a bootleg!"

This record should've been out a month ago really ... and the problem is with our distributor [Capitol Records] ... I mean, I'll just put it out with CBS and, you know, Bhaskar will have to sue me. [raises fist] Bhaskar Menon!

— Harrison discussing the album's delay on The Dick Cavett Show, 23 November 1971

In the fourth week of November – well into the lucrative Christmas sales period and close to four months after the concerts – Harrison voiced his frustration at the stalemate with Capitol on ABC's late-night chat show, The Dick Cavett Show. Harrison was on the program to promote the Raga documentary with Shankar, but after making a surprise guest performance with Gary Wright's new band Wonderwheel, he launched into a complaint about his US record company's interference and threatened to take the whole album package to Columbia. With the outburst attracting unfavourable attention in the press, where Capitol were viewed as "profiteering on the backs of famine victims", the company eventually backed down and agreed to release the album on Harrison's terms. Of all the labels involved, only Columbia would make any money from The Concert for Bangladesh – 25 cents on every copy sold. Although none of these royalties went to the artist, Dylan and his record company were already benefiting from the exposure provided by the Bangladesh concerts, through the timely release of Bob Dylan's Greatest Hits Vol. II. (Note: This compilation, sporting a cover photo of Dylan taken from the concert, included the original version of "A Hard Rain's A-Gonna Fall" and went on to become the best-selling album in the artist's catalogue.) Of the other featured artists at the Concert for Bangladesh, the careers of both Preston (A&M Records) and Russell (Shelter) likewise prospered as a result of their participation, but their record companies imposed no such conditions on Apple and Capitol. (Note: For Billy Preston, a former Apple artist and protégé of Harrison's, this benefit came in the form of a career breakthrough with his first album on A&M, I Wrote a Simple Song, released in November 1971. Harrison played dobro on the album's title track, while the instrumental "Outa-Space", originally the B-side of "I Wrote a Simple Song", became the first of four million-selling singles for Preston in the US between 1972 and 1974.) In January 1972, Melody Maker's Richard Williams remarked in his Concert for Bangladesh album review: "Between them, Capitol and CBS have proved that, when it comes to awareness and enlightenment, the business is still several years behind the musicians."

Once the album had been granted a release date, Apple's financial terms ensured that as much money as possible would be raised from each copy sold, but that it would be difficult for retailers to profit financially. Some retailers responded with "shameless price gouging" on the three-record set, apparently at Capitol's recommendation. Following the protracted negotiations surrounding the live album's distribution, Harrison's disaffection with EMI/Capitol was a key factor in his leaving the company. (Note: Upon founding his own label Dark Horse Records in 1974, Harrison arranged that the label's product would be distributed by A&M Records and not EMI, even though his own artist contract with EMI was still in force. When Harrison's EMI contract lapsed in 1976, he would move Dark Horse's distribution to Warner Bros. Records, and release his own recordings on Dark Horse going forward.) (Note: Harrison's disenchantment with record companies' "avaricious dithering", as well as apathy on the part of Western governments towards the problems in Bangladesh, inspired songs on his Living in the Material World album (1973), notably "The Day the World Gets 'Round".)

== Artwork ==
The album booklet's back cover, showing a cheque for the concerts' box-office takings above a guitar case packed with emergency supplies; copyright Apple Records

The album's packaging was designed by Camouflage Productions partners Tom Wilkes and Barry Feinstein, the same team responsible for All Things Must Pass, rock music's first boxed triple album. Along with Alan Pariser, both Wilkes and Feinstein had taken stills photographs at Madison Square Garden, at the soundcheck on 31 July and during the concerts the next day, the results filling the 64-page full-colour booklet accompanying the original album. Also used as the Concert for Bangladesh film poster, the album-cover photograph – the "haunting" image of a malnourished young child sitting naked behind a wide, empty food bowl, author Bruce Spizer writes – was a still taken from news agency film footage and airbrushed extensively by Wilkes. Having created the provocative, headline-filled picture sleeve for Harrison's "Bangla Desh" single earlier in the year, Wilkes was keen to capture "real human compassion" in this cover and poster image.

The booklet's back-cover picture showed an open guitar case filled with food and medical supplies, below a copy of the cheque for the Madison Square Garden box-office takings. Wilkes intended this image to convey a sense of hope, signifying the completion of the task that the participants had set out to achieve for the refugees from East Pakistan. The record's liner note essay accused the West Pakistanis of undertaking "a deliberate reign of terror" that represented "undoubtedly the greatest atrocity since Hitler's extermination of the Jews".

The three LPs and booklet were housed inside a deep orange-coloured box. According to Jon Taplin, who served as production manager at the Madison Square concerts, Capitol executives were concerned that the cover image was too "depressing" and uncommercial. Harrison was resolute, however, and so Wilkes's design was used.

== Release ==
The Concert for Bangladesh was released in the United States on 20 December 1971, and in Britain on 10 January 1972, with the same Apple Records catalogue number (STCX 3385) in both territories. The retail price for the lavishly packaged triple album was set at $12.98 in America and an extraordinarily high £5.50 in the UK, due to the purchase tax surcharge there. The prices drew some criticism, from Harrison for one, even if it was accepted that the proceeds were going to those in desperate need – or, as Beatles Forever author Nicholas Schaffner wrote in 1977, to "a nation still viewed as the worst pocket of misery on earth". Similarly, the relief project's funds controversy and tax problems, which came to light shortly after the release of the live album, were a source of frustration to Harrison, but commentators have noted that these problems took nothing away from the "resounding success" of Harrison and Shankar's Bangladesh relief project.

Despite the cost, the album was an immediate commercial success. In America, it spent six weeks at number 2 on the Billboard Top LPs chart. On the other US charts, compiled by Cash Box and Record World, the live album peaked at number 2 and number 1, respectively. It was certified gold by the Recording Industry Association of America on 4 January 1972 for sales of over 500,000 units and almost 1.500.000 units sold globally in the United States. In the UK, The Concert for Bangladesh became Harrison's second number 1 album, after All Things Must Pass in early 1971. In Melody Maker's readers poll for 1972, it was ranked second in the "World" album category.

The album was similarly successful on charts around the world with over 5 million units sold globally. In Pakistan, the government banned the record. The government also advised its embassies and other foreign diplomatic offices that the album contained "hostile propaganda against Pakistan" and that they should pressure their local contacts to stop the music being played on the radio.

In March 1973, The Concert for Bangladesh won the Grammy Award for Album of the Year. In Harrison's absence, Ringo Starr attended the awards ceremony in Nashville and carried off a tray of Grammys, one for each of the featured performers. (Note: In The New Rolling Stone Encyclopedia of Rock & Roll, the editors say that the National Academy of Recording Arts and Sciences "inexplicably" failed to acknowledge Harrison with a second award for this win. They comment that Fleetwood Mac and Stevie Wonder both received dual awards, as artist/performer and producer, when those acts won "Album of the Year" Grammys in the 1970s.) Author Peter Lavezzoli writes that, with the success of the live album and Saul Swimmer's concert documentary, which opened in US cinemas in March 1972, Indian classical music reached its largest Western audience to date through the Concert for Bangladesh.

== Critical reception ==
=== Contemporary reviews ===
Cash Box's reviewer described The Concert for Bangladesh as "the most eagerly awaited album of 1971" and "every bit as breathtaking as we hoped". The reviewer deemed the sound "flawless" and the booklet "stunning", and concluded: "listen to the records and hear music history." Don Heckman of The New York Times similarly commented that the album lived up to expectation, and that Harrison's statements on The Dick Cavett Show had seemingly had the desired effect. For Heckman, the live album confirmed the concerts' standing as a distillation of pop music's growth and maturity throughout the 1960s, thereby offering "a decade's music in microcosm". In addition to praising the structure and pacing of the live records, he admired Harrison for continuing his post-Beatles "optimism-with‐energy attitude", which Heckman recognised as an effective counter to the Nixon-inspired apathy permeating rock music at the time. (Note: Heckman located this apathy as the aftermath to "rip-offs" such as the Woodstock, Altamont and Powder Ridge festivals, John Lennon's campaigns of self-promotion, and "the death of rock and the birth of the Jesus‐freaks".)

Having attended the concerts in August, Ed Kelleher of Circus magazine wrote that the live album not only conveyed the "magic ... the sheer joy" of the event, but the music "practically jumps right out into your life". He singled out songs by Dylan, Russell and Harrison, along with Shankar's performance, but admitted to the futility of naming "individual highlights" since the album was "one consistent high". Rolling Stone continued its near-deification of the concerts as a defining moment in the evolution of rock 'n' roll. Jon Landau wrote of Harrison: "the spirit he creates through his own demeanor is inspirational. From the personal point of view, Concert for Bangla Desh was George's moment. He put it together; and he pulled it off ..." Landau lauded the pacing and professionalism of the entire show, and recognised the highpoint as the album-closing "Bangla Desh", the lyrics of which were no longer "an expression of intent but of an accomplished mission". In The Village Voice's inaugural Pazz & Jop poll, critics voted The Concert for Bangladesh the eighth best album of 1971.

Among UK reviewers, Geoffrey Cannon of The Guardian wrote: "What Woodstock was said to be, the Madison Square Garden Bangladesh concert was. It's on record. The concert will stand as the greatest act of magnanimity rock music has yet achieved." In Melody Maker, Richard Williams began his review by saying, "If you buy only one LP in 1972, make it this one." He likened Shankar and Khan's interplay on "Bangla Dhun" to "Charlie Parker trading licks with Johnny Hodges", and found Harrison's opening trio of All Things Must Pass tracks "[u]nbelievably ... in some ways even better" than the originals, and Preston's "That's the Way God Planned It" "feverishly exciting". Williams named Dylan's "Just Like a Woman" as "the masterpiece".

In a causerie-style piece for New Statesman, Michael Nyman wrote that the music failed to support the claim that the concerts had educated listeners on the plight of the Bangladeshi refugees. He admired many of the performances but detected an "aloofness" in Shankar's sincerity and bemoaned that Dylan's outdated repertoire surpassed some of the more recent pop selections by Harrison and Preston, and that the lavish LP booklet "must have cost money which could have been channelled elsewhere". (Note: Nyman compared the live album with the Deben Bhattacharya-compiled The Living Tradition – Music from Bangladesh, which contained locally recorded Bangladeshi folk music with new, topical lyrics. He said that the folk collection also demonstrated no immediate connection with the cause, but neither did it make "extravagant claims" to be raising funds and international awareness.)

The NME's Roy Carr and Tony Tyler deemed the concerts "probably the greatest indoor rock 'n' roll event ever held", adding that Dylan's five-song set "easily justified" the album's price tag. As at the time of the concerts, much was made by music journalists of the change in Dylan's singing voice, as well as his choice of songs, which harked back to the so-called protest period of 1962–64 and the creative zenith that culminated in his 1966 album Blonde on Blonde. "While My Guitar Gently Weeps" was another track that received significant attention, thanks to the guitar "duelling" between Harrison and Clapton. (Note: Writing in Rolling Stone Press' Harrison tribute, Greg Kot views the performance as "a snapshot of early-Seventies rock royalty". Simon Leng comments that their joint soloing was about friendship, rather than the "six-string ego battles" or "macho showdowns" so typical of that decade.)

=== Retrospective assessments and legacy ===
Professional ratings
Review scores
Source	Rating
AllMusic	4.5/5 stars
Blender	4/5 stars
Christgau's Record Guide	B−
Mojo	4/5 stars
MusicHound Rock	4/5
Pitchfork	9.0/10
Q	4/5 stars
Record Collector	4/5 stars
Rolling Stone	5/5 stars
Uncut	5/5 stars

In the description of author Ian Inglis, The Concert for Bangladesh "established the artistic legitimacy of the charity album". While the technical imperfections of the concert recordings were overlooked in 1972 – or even applauded for their adding to the "honesty" of the moment, in the case of Starr forgetting the lyrics to "It Don't Come Easy" – reviewers of the first CD-format album remarked on the relatively poor sound quality. (Note: Simon Leng goes so far as to rate The Concert for Bangladesh second only to the "awful" Beatles at the Hollywood Bowl (1977) in terms of poor-sounding live albums.) In his review for AllMusic in 2001, Bruce Eder commented on the "less-than-perfect sound" while still viewing the album as a "unique live document showcasing Harrison near his best". Paul Du Noyer of Blender wrote that some of the performances are unpolished yet "the occasion still crackles with drama", and he named "Wah-Wah", "While My Guitar Gently Weeps" and "Mr. Tambourine Man" as the standout songs.

Another point of contention, though mainly among Harrison's biographers, concerns Leon Russell. Alan Clayson bristles at the omnipresence of the Oklahoman singer and musician; he describes Russell as "the epitome of the self-satisfied sexism of the Delaney and Bonnie super-sidemen" and rues that his turn in the spotlight so blatantly became "The Leon Russell Show". Leng similarly bemoans Russell's "consciously extreme hollerin'", and finds his delivery pales beside the "unaffected naïveté" of Preston and particularly the "knife-edge emotions" of Harrison and Shankar, which only Dylan can match. By contrast, Paul Evans, writing in the 1992 Rolling Stone Album Guide, gave the record three stars and preferred the Dylan set over Harrison's songs.

Among reviews of the 2005 reissue, Mojo described the remastered sound as "sumptuous" while AllMusic's Richard Ginell wrote: "Hands down, this epochal concert ... was the crowning event of George Harrison's public life, a gesture of great goodwill that captured the moment in history and, not incidentally, produced some rousing music as a permanent legacy." Writing in Rolling Stone that year, Anthony DeCurtis said: "The Concert for Bangladesh is rightly enshrined in rock history as the model for Band Aid, Live Aid, Live 8 and every other superstar benefit concert of the last three decades ... In emphasizing the concert's idealism, however, it's easy to overlook what a musical gem this two-disc set is." Dan Ouellette of Billboard considered that "The star-studded package holds up well as a live greatest-hits collection", before concluding: "But the revelation is the exhilarating concert lift-off, the improv-laced eastern Indian classical tune 'Bangla Dhun,' featuring sitar master Ravi Shankar." Record Collector's Joe Shooman began his review by saying, "Still great, so buy it – again", adding that "the saddest part is that the cash is still badly needed [in Bangladesh]."

In his entry for the album in the book 1,000 Recordings to Hear Before You Die, Tom Moon recognises the concerts as "the first large-scale example of rock activism", saying that Harrison and his fellow performers provided the blueprint for celebrities to employ their fame for charitable causes. (Note: He also writes that while many charitable projects have followed the 1971 event, "few have been as musically consequential as The Concert for Bangladesh.") Moon advises listeners to "Pull this out whenever your faith in the power of music begins to wane", and suggests Preston's "That's the Way God Planned It" as a primer track. Pitchfork's Quinn Moreland deems the Bangladesh relief project "a musical triumph and a momentous collaborative effort". He writes that while subsequent benefit concerts might encourage a suspicion that celebrity musicians merely "play philanthropist for a day", the Concert for Bangladesh was the realisation of Harrison's commitment to the Indian subcontinent, beyond the cultural appropriation suggested by his initial alliance with Shankar in the mid-1960s. Nigel Williamson of Uncut compliments Harrison and Spector for retaining the imperfections of the live recordings and thereby conveying the spirit of the all-star concerts. He views Dylan's set as "spellbinding" and a final reprise of the singer's "mythic voice-of-a-generation image", and concludes of the album: "seldom before or since has rock music sounded so honest, so caring – and so capable of making us smile and cry at the same time."

The Concert for Bangladesh also features in Sean Egan's 2006 book 100 Albums That Changed Music and in The Mojo Collection: The Ultimate Music Collection. It was ranked number 1 in Spanish Rolling Stone's list of "The 30 Greatest Live Albums of All Time", published in 2013.

== Reissues ==
The Concert for Bangladesh was first issued on CD on 30 July 1991 in America and 19 August in Britain. It was presented as a two-disc set, with significant editing of the breaks between songs. The downsizing to CD dimensions meant that much of the effectiveness of the booklet photography was lost; in addition, the contents were trimmed down to 36 pages. Having stated his disappointment in a 1988 interview that the album had been allowed to go out of print, Harrison recorded a promotional interview on the 20th anniversary of the concerts, to accompany the CD release.

Harrison was working on a reissue of the album and film before his death in November 2001. Although the project was due for release the following year, the new editions were not issued until 25 October 2005. The remastered releases appeared with a photo of Harrison on the cover, although the special-edition DVD retained the original image. The reissue was the 1972 concert film's first international release on DVD. It was accompanied by the Concert for Bangladesh Revisited with George Harrison and Friends making-of documentary, which was directed by Claire Ferguson and co-produced by Olivia Harrison. (Note: While promoting the release in October 2005, Olivia said that part of the reason for the reissue not taking place in 2001 was that Harrison had been sent the wrong master tapes to work on. She added that he had then contacted Spector, who supplied the correct version.)

The revised packaging was credited to Wherefore Art? As a bonus track, the album included "Love Minus Zero/No Limit", which Dylan had performed during the afternoon show (i.e. the matinee performance) at Madison Square Garden. (Note: Among other changes in the running order after the matinee performance, Dylan replaced "Love Minus Zero" with "Mr. Tambourine Man" for the evening show and Harrison dropped "Hear Me Lord". The latter remains the only song played at the Concert for Bangladesh that has not received an official release.)

Sales of the Concert for Bangladesh album and DVD continue to benefit the George Harrison Fund for UNICEF. In 2011, as one of the fund's projects to mark the 40th anniversary of the concerts and the live album's release, and in conjunction with UNICEF's "Month of Giving" campaign, the George Harrison Fund for UNICEF raised over $1.2 million in emergency relief for children in famine- and drought-stricken areas of the Horn of Africa.

On August 9, 2024, The Concert for Bangladesh was made available to stream across all major digital streaming platforms.

== Track listing ==
=== Original release ===
Side one
No.	Title	Writer(s)	Performer(s)	Length
1.	"George Harrison/Ravi Shankar Introduction"	—	George Harrison, Ravi Shankar	5:19
2.	"Bangla Dhun"	Shankar	Shankar, Ali Akbar Khan, Alla Rakha, Kamala Chakravarty	16:40

Side two
No.	Title	Writer(s)	Performer(s)	Length
1.	"Wah-Wah"	Harrison	Harrison	3:30
2.	"My Sweet Lord"	Harrison	Harrison	4:36
3.	"Awaiting on You All"	Harrison	Harrison	3:00
4.	"That's the Way God Planned It"	Billy Preston	Preston	4:20

Side three
No.	Title	Writer(s)	Performer(s)	Length
1.	"It Don't Come Easy"	Richard Starkey	Ringo Starr	3:01
2.	"Beware of Darkness"	Harrison	Harrison, Leon Russell	3:36
3.	"Band Introduction"	—	Harrison	2:39
4.	"While My Guitar Gently Weeps"	Harrison	Harrison	4:53

Side four
No.	Title	Writer(s)	Performer(s)	Length
1.	"Medley: Jumpin' Jack Flash/Young Blood"	Mick Jagger, Keith Richards/Jerry Leiber, Mike Stoller, Doc Pomus	Russell	9:27
2.	"Here Comes the Sun"	Harrison	Harrison, Pete Ham	2:59

Side five
No.	Title	Writer(s)	Performer(s)	Length
1.	"A Hard Rain's a-Gonna Fall"	Bob Dylan	Dylan	5:44
2.	"It Takes a Lot to Laugh, It Takes a Train to Cry"	Dylan	Dylan	3:07
3.	"Blowin' in the Wind"	Dylan	Dylan	4:07
4.	"Mr. Tambourine Man"	Dylan	Dylan	4:45
5.	"Just Like a Woman"	Dylan	Dylan	4:49

Side six
No.	Title	Writer(s)	Performer(s)	Length
1.	"Something"	Harrison	Harrison	3:42
2.	"Bangla Desh"	Harrison	Harrison	4:55

=== 2005 remaster ===
Disc one

The first disc contains the ten tracks from side one to side three of the original release.

Disc two

The second disc contains the nine tracks from side four to side six of the original release, together with:

No.	Title	Writer(s)	Performer(s)	Length
10.	"Love Minus Zero/No Limit"	Dylan	Dylan	4:19

=== 2011 40th anniversary reissue ===
A download-only version of the album per the 2005 remaster, with a second bonus track exclusive to iTunes:

No.	Title	Writer(s)	Performer(s)	Length
11.	"Bangla Desh" (studio version)	Harrison	Harrison	4:00

== Personnel ==
"The Artists"

- George Harrison – vocals, electric and acoustic guitars, backing vocals
- Ravi Shankar – sitar
- Bob Dylan – vocals, acoustic guitar, harmonica
- Leon Russell – piano, vocals, bass, backing vocals
- Ringo Starr – drums, vocals, tambourine
- Billy Preston – Hammond organ, vocals
- Eric Clapton – electric guitar
- Ali Akbar Khan – sarod
- Alla Rakha – tabla
- Kamala Chakravarty – tambura

"The Band"

- Jesse Ed Davis – electric guitar
- Klaus Voormann – bass
- Jim Keltner – drums
- Pete Ham – acoustic guitar
- Tom Evans – twelve-string acoustic guitar
- Joey Molland – acoustic guitar
- Mike Gibbins – tambourine, maracas
- Don Preston – electric guitar, vocals (on "Jumpin' Jack Flash"/"Young Blood" and "Bangla Desh" only)
- Carl Radle – bass (on "Jumpin' Jack Flash"/"Young Blood" only)

The Hollywood Horns

- Jim Horn – saxophones, horn arrangements
- Chuck Findley – trumpet
- Jackie Kelso – saxophones
- Allan Beutler – saxophones
- Lou McCreary – trombone
- Ollie Mitchell – trumpet

The Soul Choir

- Claudia Lennear, Joe Greene, Jeanie Greene, Marlin Greene, Dolores Hall, Don Nix, Don Preston – backing vocals, percussion

== Accolades ==
Year	Nominee / work	Award	Result
1973	The Concert for Bangladesh	Grammy Award for Album of the Year	Won

== Charts and certifications ==
=== Weekly charts ===
Original release

Chart (1972)	Peak position
Australian Go-Set Top 20 Albums	3
Australian Kent Music Report	5
Canada Top Albums/CDs (RPM)	2
Dutch MegaChart Albums	1
Japanese Oricon LPs Chart	2
Norwegian VG-lista Albums	1
Spanish Albums Chart	5
Swedish Kvällstoppen Chart	2
UK Albums Chart	1
UK Melody Maker Pop 30 Albums	4
US Billboard Top LPs	2
US Cash Box Top 100 Albums	2
US Record World Album Chart	1
West German Media Control Albums	29

2005 reissue

Chart (2005)	Peak position
Japanese Oricon Albums Chart	116
US Billboard Top Pop Catalog	8
Chart (2011)	Peak position
US Billboard 200	116
Chart (2026)	Peak position
French Rock & Metal Albums (SNEP)	42

=== Year-end charts ===
Chart (1972)	Position
Dutch Albums Chart	5
US Billboard Year-End	16

=== Certifications ===
Region	Certification
United States (RIAA)	Gold

== Sources ==
- Badman, Keith (2001), The Beatles Diary Volume 2: After the Break-Up 1970–2001, London: Omnibus Press, ISBN 0-7119-8307-0.
- Bogdanov, Vladimir; Woodstra, Chris; Erlewine, Stephen Thomas, eds. (2001), All Music Guide: The Definitive Guide to Popular Music (4th ed.), San Francisco, CA: Backbeat Books, ISBN 0-87930-627-0.
- Carr, Roy; Tyler, Tony (1978), The Beatles: An Illustrated Record, London: Trewin Copplestone Publishing, ISBN 0-450-04170-0.
- Castleman, Harry; Podrazik, Walter J. (1976), All Together Now: The First Complete Beatles Discography 1961–1975, New York, NY: Ballantine Books, ISBN 0-345-25680-8.
- Clayson, Alan (2003), George Harrison, London: Sanctuary, ISBN 1-86074-489-3.
- Ferguson, Claire (director) (2005). The Concert for Bangladesh Revisited with George Harrison and Friends (DVD). Produced by Olivia Harrison, Jonathan Clyde & Jo Human. Apple Corps.
- The Editors of Rolling Stone (2002), Harrison, New York, NY: Rolling Stone Press/Simon & Schuster, ISBN 0-7432-3581-9.
- Graff, Gary; Durchholz, Daniel, eds. (1999), MusicHound Rock: The Essential Album Guide, Farmington Hills, MI: Visible Ink Press, ISBN 1-57859-061-2.
- Greene, Joshua M. (2006), Here Comes the Sun: The Spiritual and Musical Journey of George Harrison, Hoboken, NJ: John Wiley & Sons, ISBN 978-0-470-12780-3.
- Guralnick, Paul (2002), Careless Love: The Unmaking of Elvis Presley, London: Abacus, ISBN 0-349-11168-5.
- Harris, John (July 2001), "A Quiet Storm", Mojo.
- Harrison, George (2002), I Me Mine, San Francisco, CA: Chronicle Books, ISBN 0-8118-3793-9.
- Harrison, Olivia (2011), George Harrison: Living in the Material World, New York, NY: Abrams, ISBN 978-1-4197-0220-4.
- Harry, Bill (2003), The George Harrison Encyclopedia, London: Virgin Books, ISBN 978-0-7535-0822-0.
- Heylin, Clinton (2011), Bob Dylan: Behind the Shades ((20th Anniversary ed.), London: Faber and Faber, ISBN 978-0-571-27240-2.
- Inglis, Ian (2010), The Words and Music of George Harrison, Santa Barbara, CA: Praeger, ISBN 978-0-313-37532-3.
- Larkin, Colin (2011), The Encyclopedia of Popular Music (5th ed.), London: Omnibus Press, ISBN 978-0-85712-595-8.
- Lavezzoli, Peter (2006), The Dawn of Indian Music in the West, New York, NY: Continuum, ISBN 0-8264-2819-3.
- Leng, Simon (2006), While My Guitar Gently Weeps: The Music of George Harrison, Milwaukee, WI: Hal Leonard, ISBN 1-4234-0609-5.
- MacDonald, Ian (1998), Revolution in the Head: The Beatles' Records and the Sixties, London: Pimlico, ISBN 0-7126-6697-4.
- Madinger, Chip; Easter, Mark (2000), Eight Arms to Hold You: The Solo Beatles Compendium, Chesterfield, MO: 44.1 Productions, ISBN 0-615-11724-4.
- Moon, Tom (2008), 1,000 Recordings to Hear Before You Die, New York, NY: Workman Publishing, ISBN 978-0-7611-5385-6.
- O'Dell, Chris; Ketcham, Katherine (2009), Miss O'Dell: My Hard Days and Long Nights with The Beatles, The Stones, Bob Dylan, Eric Clapton, and the Women They Loved, New York, NY: Touchstone, ISBN 978-1-4165-9093-4.
- Raghavan, Srinath (2013), 1971: A Global History of the Creation of Bangladesh, Cambridge, MA: Harvard University Press, ISBN 978-0-674-72864-6, archived from the original on 14 May 2021.
- Rodriguez, Robert (2010), Fab Four FAQ 2.0: The Beatles' Solo Years 1970–1980, Milwaukee, WI: Hal Leonard, ISBN 978-0-87930-968-8.
- Romanowski, Patricia; George-Warren, Holly, eds. (1995), The New Rolling Stone Encyclopedia of Rock & Roll, New York, NY: Fireside/Rolling Stone Press, ISBN 0-684-81044-1.
- Schaffner, Nicholas (1978), The Beatles Forever, New York, NY: McGraw-Hill, ISBN 0-07-055087-5.
- Sounes, Howard (2001), Down the Highway: The Life of Bob Dylan, London: Doubleday, ISBN 0-385-60125-5.
- Spizer, Bruce (2005), The Beatles Solo on Apple Records, New Orleans, LA: 498 Productions, ISBN 0-9662649-5-9.
- Tillery, Gary (2011), Working Class Mystic: A Spiritual Biography of George Harrison, Wheaton, IL: Quest Books, ISBN 978-0-8356-0900-5.
- Woffinden, Bob (1981), The Beatles Apart, London: Proteus, ISBN 0-906071-89-5.
