= Shubhendra Shankar =

Indian musician (1942–1992)

- Born: March 30, 1942
- Died: September 15, 1992 (aged 50); Los Alamitos, California, United States
- Education: Otis College of Art and Design
- Spouse: Linda
- Children: 2
- Parents: Ravi Shankar (father); Annapurna Devi (mother)
- Relatives: Norah Jones (half-sister); Anoushka Shankar (half-sister)

Shubhendra Shankar (30 March 1942 – 15 September 1992), also known as Shubho Shankar, was an Indian graphic artist, musician and composer. He was the only son of musicians Annapurna Devi and Ravi Shankar.

== Early life ==
Shubhendra Shankar was the son of the surbahar virtuoso and teacher Annapurna Devi and sitar maestro Ravi Shankar. Hailing from a gifted Hindustani classical music background, his grandfather was the legendary Ustad Allauddin Khan, the founder of the Maihar Gharana. He was also the nephew of sarod maestro Ali Akbar Khan, and the cousin of sarodists Ashish Khan, Dhyanesh Khan, Alam Khan, and Manik Khan. Through his father's side, he was the older half-brother of Norah Jones and Anoushka Shankar.

Shankar learned the sitar initially from his father, Ravi Shankar. His tutorship was handed over to his mother Annapurna Devi, when Ravi Shankar could not make time due to his hectic work schedule at the All India Radio and concert tours across India. While living at his father's home in Hollywood, he painted and drew, and earned a degree in fine arts from the Otis Art Institute of the Parsons School of Design in Los Angeles.

In 1971, within two years of his arrival in the United States, Shankar performed in a concert for the first time, playing with his father at New York's Carnegie Hall. The performance was titled "Fathers and Sons" and included tabla players Alla Rakha and his son Zakir Hussain.

== Career ==
Shankar performed frequently on concert tours, composed music for films and recorded several albums. He performed with his father, appearing throughout Europe, Asia and the United States, including performances at the Kennedy Center in Washington, D.C.

After marrying, Shankar gradually dropped out of the music scene and stopped playing the sitar for almost eight years. At the age of 40, he took his father's advice to return to his music full-time. He gave lessons in sitar-playing, singing and flute in Orange County, San Diego and Los Angeles.

In 1989–1990, Shankar went on a concert tour of England, Europe and India. On this trip, which also was to be his last visit to India, he met his mother after a gap of 20 years during which the two had had no communication. He resumed learning the sitar under his mother.

Shankar played together with his father at the Sawai Gandharva Festival in Pune in 1990, where some music critics commented that he was out of tune. Shankar was dejected, and refused to stay in India to complete his sitar education, saying it was "too late now". He returned to the US, and in his last few months cut himself off from everyone.

== Personal life ==
At a concert he gave at Whittier College, Shankar met Linda, from North Carolina, soon to be his wife. They had two children, son Somnath and daughter Kaveri. Gradually he lost interest in playing the sitar. He worked as a clerk in a liquor store, painted pictures, and drew illustrations for telephone directories, in order to support his wife and two children.

== Death ==
Shankar died of pneumonia at Los Alamitos Medical Center following an illness of several months at his home in Garden Grove. He was cremated and his remains dispersed in the ocean off Marina del Rey.

== Sources ==
- Bondyopadhyay, Swapan Kumar (2005). Annapurna Devi: An Unheard Melody. Roli Books Private Limited. ISBN 9788174368553.
