= Live: Ravi Shankar at the Monterey International Pop Festival =

Live album by Ravi Shankar
- Released: November 1967
- Recorded: 18 June 1967
- Venues: Monterey County Fairgrounds, Monterey, California
- Genre: Indian classical
- Length: 53:10
- Label: World Pacific
- Producer: Richard Bock

Live: Ravi Shankar at the Monterey International Pop Festival is a live album by Indian sitarist Ravi Shankar, released on the World Pacific record label in November 1967. It consists of part of Shankar's celebrated performance at the Monterey International Pop Festival in California on 18 June 1967. Part of this performance, namely Dhun (Dhadra and Fast Teental), are featured in D.A. Pennebaker's 1968 film Monterrey Pop. Shankar was accompanied throughout by his regular tabla player, Alla Rakha, who performs a frenetic five-minute solo on the recording.

In the United States, the album peaked at number 43 on Billboard's pop LPs listings – the highest placing Shankar achieved on that chart throughout his career.

== Background ==
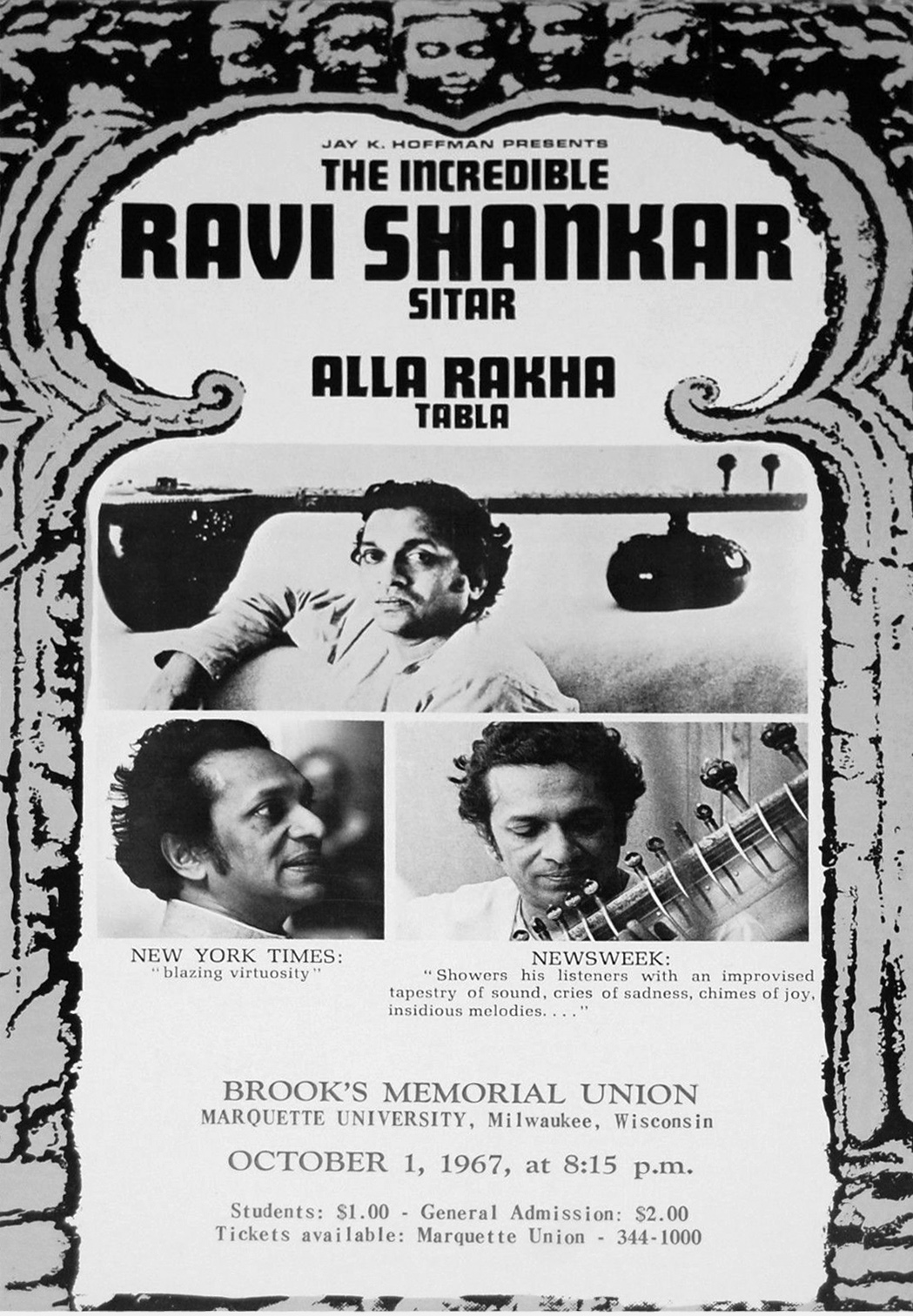
Advertisement for a US concert by Shankar and Rakha, held four months after Monterey

Ravi Shankar's appearance at the Monterey International Pop Festival marked a highpoint in the popularity of Indian classical music in the West, during a period when rock groups such as the Beatles, the Byrds and the Rolling Stones had increasingly adopted aspects of the genre in their work. Adding to Shankar's own standing among Western youth, he had achieved fame for his role as sitar teacher to George Harrison, the Beatles' lead guitarist. Having moved to California in February 1967 due to the demand for his concerts in the United States, the festival was Shankar's first performance at a rock event, as well as the first event to combine the diverse elements of contemporary popular music in a festival setting.

Shankar admired the artistry and musicianship of some of his fellow performers on the three-day program, particularly Simon & Garfunkel, Janis Joplin, Jimi Hendrix and Otis Redding. He was appalled, however, at the sight of Hendrix setting fire to his electric guitar, and by the Who's destruction of their instruments at the end of their set.

== Performance ==
In addition to Rakha on tabla, Shankar was accompanied by tambura player Kamala Chakravarty, his partner at the time. Author Peter Lavezzoli writes of the reception the Indian musicians received: "Shankar gave what he considered to be one of his best performances, and the response of the audience was ecstatic, further catapulting Shankar to stardom." Noting that most of the festival's Western performers were among the crowd also, Lavezzolli describes the Indian music portion as Shankar's "Monterey coup d'etat".

Part of the set was included in the 1968 documentary film Monterey Pop, directed by D.A. Pennebaker. Writing in The Guardian in 2011, Caspar Llewellyn Smith said that the festival was in some ways "of even greater lasting significance" than the larger Woodstock Festival of 1969, adding that Shankar's performance "demonstrat[ed] where the Byrds and the Beatles had recently picked up influences".

== Release and reception ==
Professional ratings
Review scores
Source	Rating
AllMusic	4/5 stars
Q	3/5 stars

Billboard magazine predicted that Live: Ravi Shankar at the Monterey International Pop Festival would become Shankar's "best seller to date", given his popularity over the past year. The album duly climbed to number 43 on the national Top LP's listings (later the Billboard 200), the highest placing Shankar ever achieved on that chart, and reached number 20 on the same magazine's Jazz Albums list. This success coincided with Shankar's continued run at number 1 on Billboard's Best Selling Classical LP's, with West Meets East; in addition, the magazine honoured him as its Artist of the Year for 1967, the first time that an Indian musician had received such an award.

Reviewing the UK release in October 1968, Disc and Music Echo welcomed the live album as "a stone groove!" The writer concluded: "Obviously for the audience Mr Shankar more than held his own with the best of Jimi Hendrix, Big Brother and the Holding Company and the Grateful Dead, plus whoever else was on the incredible bill. Hear this, and you should see why."

Live: Ravi Shankar at the Monterey International Pop Festival was issued on CD in October 1998, on EMI's Angel label. AllMusic's reviewer admires the performance as "finely wrought, intense and hypnotic, and melodically rich". In 2012, Rolling Stone critic David Fricke included the live album among the five best recordings from Shankar's career, writing:

One of the most explosive moments in D.A. Pennenbaker's film, Monterey Pop, comes after [segments featuring] the Who and Jimi Hendrix: the excerpt from Shankar's elegant and blazing Sunday-afternoon set and the sudden, volcanic applause at the end, by a truly stunned audience. There are many live Shankar albums from the Sixties and early Seventies; this one preserves a generous portion of an extraordinary moment in his life – and rock's expanding consciousness.

Anastasia Tsioulcas of NPR Music included it on a similar list and highlighted the synergy between Shankar and Rakha, whose "memorable solo in ektal (a 12-beat rhythmic cycle)" she cited as evidence of "a profound and exciting partnership between equals". The 1998 CD release is ranked at number 81 in Rough Guides' list of "World 100 Essential CDs".

== Track listing ==
All selections traditional, adapted by Ravi Shankar.

Side one

1. "Raga Bhimpalasi" – 27:30

Side two

2. "Tabla Solo in Ektal" – 6:15
3. "Dhun (Dadra and Fast Teental)" – 19:25

== Personnel ==
- Ravi Shankar – sitar
- Alla Rakha – tabla
- Kamala Chakravarty – tambura
- Richard Bock – production
- Wally Heider – engineering

== Sources ==
- Broughton, Simon (2000). The Rough Guide to World 100 Essential CDs (Rough Guide 100 Esntl CD Guide). London: Rough Guides. ISBN 978-1-858285986.
- Clayson, Alan (2003). George Harrison. London: Sanctuary. ISBN 1-86074-489-3.
- Lavezzoli, Peter (2006). The Dawn of Indian Music in the West. New York, NY: Continuum. ISBN 0-8264-2819-3.
- The Mojo Collection (4th edn) (2000). London: Canongate Books. ISBN 978-1-84195-973-3.
- Shankar, Ravi (2007). My Music, My Life. San Rafael, CA: Mandala Publishing. ISBN 978-1-60109-005-8.
- Shankar, Ravi (1999). Raga Mala: The Autobiography of Ravi Shankar. New York, NY: Welcome Rain. ISBN 1-56649-104-5.
- World Music: The Rough Guide (Volume 2: Latin and North America, Caribbean, India, Asia and Pacific) (2000). London: Rough Guides/Penguin. ISBN 1-85828-636-0.
