= Annapurna Devi =

Indian musician (1927–2018)

- Born: Roshanara Khan; 17 April 1927; Maihar, Central India Agency, British India
- Died: 13 October 2018 (aged 91); Mumbai, India
- Occupation: Musician
- Spouse(s): Ravi Shankar (m. 1941; div. 1982) Rooshikumar Pandya (m. 1982; died 2013)
- Children: Shubhendra Shankar
- Father: Allauddin Khan

Annapurna Devi (Bengali pronunciation: [ɔnːopurɳa debi]; 17 April 1927 – 13 October 2018) was an Indian surbahar player of Hindustani classical music and an influential music teacher. The daughter and disciple of Ustad Allauddin Khan and younger sister of sarod maestro Ustad Ali Akbar Khan, she was trained in the Maihar gharana and became a master of the surbahar. Although she gave relatively few public performances and withdrew from the concert stage in the 1950s, she was regarded by musicians and connoisseurs as an exceptional exponent of Hindustani classical music and was described by the Sangeet Natak Akademi as the "doyenne of the Maihar gharana".

Devi performed publicly with her first husband and fellow disciple Ravi Shankar during the 1940s and 1950s. Despite her short performing career and the scarcity of recordings of her playing, her musicianship was held in unusually high regard. Shankar himself described her playing as being of an "extremely advanced order" and her command of Allauddin Khan's repertoire and style as impeccable. Her brother Ali Akbar Khan also placed her musicianship above his own and that of several other leading instrumentalists of their generation. She was the only known female maestro of the surbahar in the twentieth century.

After withdrawing from public performance, Devi devoted herself principally to teaching. Her students included Nikhil Banerjee, Hariprasad Chaurasia, Nityanand Haldipur, Aashish Khan, Basant Kabra and other prominent musicians.

== Biography ==
Annapurna Devi was born on 17 April 1927 at Maihar, a princely state in Madhya Pradesh, India. Her father, Ustad Allauddin Khan, was the royal court musician at the court of Maharaja Brijnath Singh of Maihar State. Since her father was away on the day of her birth, the Maharaja named her 'Annapurna'. Born into a Muslim family, her Islamic name was Roshanara Khan. She was nevertheless known as Annapurna at home, and the name was legally formalised when she converted to Hinduism on the day of her marriage to Ravi Shankar.

Her father, Allauddin Khan, was a disciple of Ustad Mohammad Wazir Khan and went on to found the Senia-Maihar gharana. Devi's elder brother, Ustad Ali Akbar Khan, became one of the foremost exponents of the sarod.

Allauddin Khan discovered when Devi was young that she had exceptional pitch and an unusual ability to remember musical notation. He initially trained her in vocal music and later in the sitar. He subsequently moved her to the surbahar, intending to transmit to her the more complex beenkari tradition he had inherited from Wazir Khan. Devi played the instrument in the Wazirkhani beenkari style and became one of the principal inheritors of her father's musical tradition.

On 15 May 1941, Devi converted to Hinduism and married fellow pupil Ravi Shankar, at the behest of Shankar's eldest brother Uday Shankar. They had a son, Shubhendra Shankar (1942–1992), who became a graphic artist and musician. The marriage deteriorated over the following decades, and they became informally separated during the 1960s. Shankar subsequently left India with Kamala Chakravarty. Devi and Shankar divorced in 1982.

Devi married Rooshikumar Pandya in Bombay on 9 December 1982. Pandya, a communication expert and psychology professor in Canada and the United States, was also an amateur sitarist and had studied with Devi since 1973 at the recommendation of her brother Ali Akbar Khan. He died of cardiac arrest in April 2013 at the age of 73. Annapurna Devi died of age-related causes on 13 October 2018 in Mumbai, aged 91. In her later years, she was cared for by her students, particularly Pandit Nityanand Haldipur.

== Career ==
One of Devi's earliest surbahar performances was given in honour of the Raja of Maihar, who rewarded her with a large tract of land.

From the 1940s through the mid-1950s, Devi appeared publicly both independently and in duet with Ravi Shankar. Their performances included concerts at Talkatora Gardens and the Constitution Club in New Delhi and at Eden Gardens and Park Circus in Kolkata. Devi later recalled that audiences responded strongly to her playing and that she frequently received greater appreciation than Shankar from audiences and critics.

Devi attributed her withdrawal from public performance in part to the effect this reception had on her marriage. In a 2014 interview, she said that Shankar was unhappy when she received greater applause and critical appreciation and that this had a negative effect on their relationship. She said that, although he did not explicitly forbid her from performing, she chose to give up professional recognition in an attempt to preserve the marriage. Shankar disputed her account of their musical rivalry. Devi gave her last public performance in 1956.

After leaving the concert stage, Devi continued an intensive private musical practice and became a highly influential teacher. While teaching at her brother's music college in Calcutta, she occasionally performed, with strict instructions that her playing not be recorded. After moving permanently to Mumbai, she taught for a period at the National Centre for the Performing Arts (NCPA).

For the remainder of her life, Devi was a much sought-after guru for students and practitioners of Hindustani classical music, although she accepted only a small number of pupils. Following her father's practice, she did not charge fees for her teaching. Her pupils studied a range of instruments and included musicians who became major performers in their own right. (Note: Many of her students were also students of her brother Ali Akbar Khan and/or Ravi Shankar.) They included:

Instruments	Students
Sitar	Nikhil Banerjee
	Bahadur Khan
	Hiren Roy
	Kartik Kumar
	Indranil Bhattacharya
	Debi Prasad Chatterji
	Sudhir Phadke
	Sandhya Phadke-Apte
Sarod	Aashish Khan
	Dhyanesh Khan
	Basant Kabra
	Pradeep Barot
	Suresh Vyas
Flute	Hariprasad Chaurasia
	Nityanand Haldipur
Dilruba	Dakshina Mohan Tagore
Violin	Satyadev Pawar
Surbahar	Niloufer Khan
Vocal	Vinay Bharat Ram

She was also the key figure of Acharya Alauddin Music Circle in Mumbai.

== Honours ==
- 1977, she received the Padma Bhushan (India's third highest civilian honour).
- 1991, she received the Sangeet Natak Akademi Award (India's highest honour in performing arts).
- 1999, the Desikottama, an honorary doctorate degree by Visva-Bharati University.
- In 2004, she was made a fellow of the Sangeet Natak Akademi.

== Sources ==
- Bondyopadhyay, Swapan Kumar (2005). Annapurna Devi: An Unheard Melody. Roli Books Private Limited. ISBN 9788174368553.
- Annapūrṇā Devi, The Oxford Encyclopaedia of the Music of India. Oxford University Press. 2011. ISBN 9780195650983.
- Dalal, Roshen (2017). India at 70: snapshots since Independence. Penguin Random House India Private Limited. p. 286. ISBN 9789386815378.
- Lavezzoli, Peter (2006). The Dawn of Indian Music in the West. A&C Black. ISBN 9780826418159.
- Lindgren, Kristina (21 September 1992). "Shubho Shankar Dies After Long Illness at 50". Los Angeles Times.
- Ramanathan, Jaya (28 June 2005). "Unveiling the Mystique of a Reclusive Artiste". The Hindu. Archived from the original on 31 May 2009.
- "Notes from behind a locked door (A rare interview)". The Indian Express. 16 May 2010.
- "Raviji never left her". The Times of India.
