= Ravi Shankar =

Indian musician and sitar player (1920–2012)

Pandit Ravi Shankar
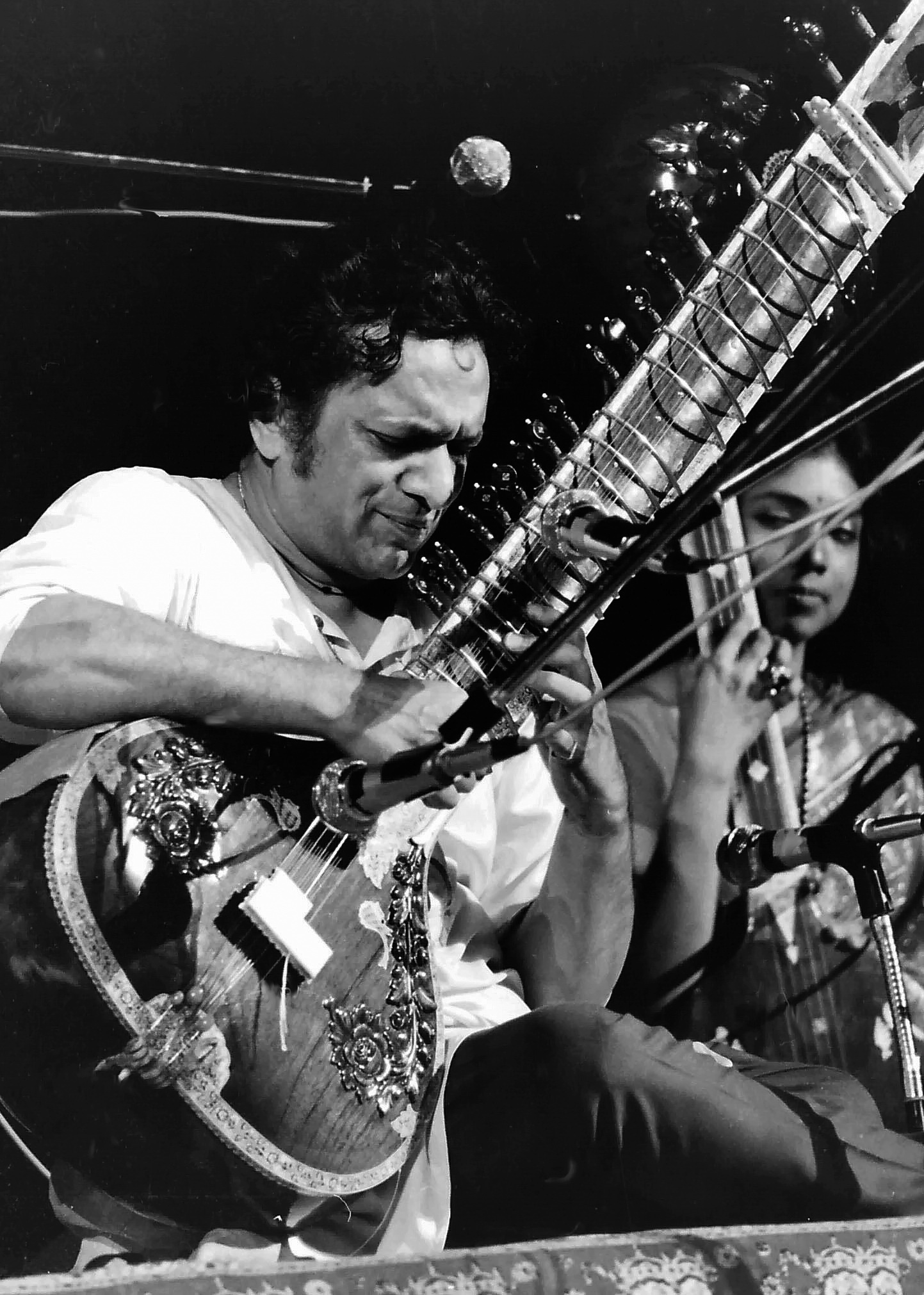
- Shankar performing at Woodstock in 1969
- Born: Robindro Shaunkor Chowdhury; 7 April 1920; Banaras, Banaras State, British India
- Died: 11 December 2012 (aged 92); San Diego, California, U.S.
- Occupations: Musician; composer
- Spouses: Annapurna Devi (m. 1941; div. 1982) Sukanya Rajan (m. 1989)
- Children: Shubhendra Shankar; Norah Jones; Anoushka Shankar

Member of Parliament, Rajya Sabha
- In office 12 May 1986 – 11 May 1992
- Musical career
- Genre: Indian classical music
- Instrument: Sitar
- Years active: 1930–2012
- Labels: World Pacific; Angel; His Master's Voice; Apple; Dark Horse; Private Music; East Meets West
- Website: ravishankar.org

Pandit Ravi Shankar (Bengali: [ˈrobi ˈʃɔŋkor]; born Robindro Shaunkor Chowdhury, sometimes spelled as Ravindra Shankar Chowdhury; 7 April 1920 – 11 December 2012) was an Indian sitarist and composer. Ravi Shankar was born in Banaras. A sitar virtuoso, he was, together with sarod virtuoso Ali Akbar Khan, among the most prominent exponents of Hindustani classical music in the second half of the 20th century, and played a major role in bringing Indian classical music to international audiences. Shankar influenced many musicians in India and throughout the world. He was awarded India's highest civilian honour, the Bharat Ratna, in 1999. He is also the father of American singer Norah Jones and British-American musician and sitar player Anoushka Shankar.

Shankar was born to a Bengali family in India, and spent his youth as a dancer touring India and Europe with the dance group of his brother Uday Shankar. At age 18, he gave up dancing to pursue a career in music, studying the sitar for seven years under court musician Allauddin Khan. After finishing his studies in 1944, Shankar worked as a composer, creating the music for the Apu Trilogy by Satyajit Ray, and was music director of All India Radio, New Delhi, from 1949 to 1956.

In 1956, Shankar began to tour Europe and America, playing Indian classical music. He increased its popularity there in the 1960s through teaching, performance, and his association with violinist Yehudi Menuhin and Beatles guitarist George Harrison. His influence on Harrison helped popularize the use of Indian instruments in Western pop music in the latter half of the 1960s. Shankar engaged Western music by writing compositions for sitar and orchestra and touring the world in the 1970s and 1980s. From 1986 to 1992, he served as a nominated member of Rajya Sabha, the upper house of the Parliament of India. He continued to perform until the end of his life. He was a recipient of numerous prestigious musical accolades, including a Polar Music Prize and four Grammy Awards, including Album of the Year for The Concert for Bangladesh in 1973, as well as an Academy Award nomination for Best Original Score for scoring the blockbuster Gandhi (1982).

== Early life ==
Shankar was born on 7 April 1920 in Benares (now Varanasi), then the capital of the princely state of the same name, in a Bengali Hindu family, as the youngest of seven brothers. His father, Shyam Shankar Chowdhury, was a Middle Temple barrister and scholar who was from Narail district of modern-day Bangladesh (then Jessore district in Bengal, British India). A statesman, lawyer, and politician, he served for several years as dewan (Prime Minister) of Jhalawar State, Rajasthan, and used the Sanskrit spelling of the family name and removed its last part. Shyam was married to Hemangini Devi, who hailed from a small village named Nasrathpur in Mardah block of Ghazipur district, near Benares and her father was a prosperous landlord. Shyam later worked as a lawyer in London, England, and there he married a second time while Devi raised Shankar in Benares, and he did not meet his son until he was eight years old.

Shankar shortened the Sanskrit version of his first name, Ravindra, to Ravi, for "sun". Shankar had five siblings: Uday (who became a choreographer and dancer), Rajendra, Debendra and Bhupendra. Shankar attended the Bengalitola High School in Benares between 1927 and 1928.

At the age of 10, after spending his first decade in Benares, Shankar went to Paris with the dance group of his brother, choreographer Uday Shankar. By the age of 13 he had become a member of the group, accompanied its members on tour and learned to dance, and play various Indian instruments. Uday's dance group travelled Europe and the United States in the early to mid-1930s and Shankar learned French, discovered Western classical music, jazz, cinema and became acquainted with Western customs. Shankar heard Allauddin Khan – the lead musician at the court of the princely state of Maihar – play at a music conference in December 1934 in Calcutta, and Uday persuaded the Maharaja of Maihar H.H. Maharaja Brijnath Singh Judev in 1935 to allow Khan to become his group's soloist for a tour of Europe. Shankar was sporadically trained by Khan on tour, and Khan offered Shankar training to become a serious musician under the condition that he abandon touring and come to Maihar.

== Career ==
=== Musical training and work in India ===
Shankar's parents had died by the time he returned from the European tour, and touring the West had become difficult because of political conflicts that would lead to World War II. In 1938, Shankar decided to leave his dancing career to study Indian classical music under the tutelage of Khan in Maihar. He lived with Khan’s family as part of the traditional gurukul system. Khan was a strict teacher, and during his training, Shankar learned to play the sitar and surbahar. He also studied various ragas and musical styles, including dhrupad, dhamar, and khyal, and received instruction on instruments such as the rudra veena, rubab, and sursingar. He often studied with Khan's children Ali Akbar Khan and Annapurna Devi. Shankar made his public debut on the sitar in December 1939, performing a jugalbandi (duet) with Ali Akbar Khan, who played the string instrument sarod.

Shankar completed his musical training in 1944. He then moved to Mumbai and joined the Indian People's Theatre Association, for whom he composed music for ballets in 1945 and 1946, Dharti Ke Lal, 1946. Shankar recomposed the music for the popular song "Sare Jahan Se Achcha" at the age of 25. He began to record music for His Master's Voice and worked as a music director for All India Radio (AIR), New Delhi, from February 1949 until January 1956. Shankar founded the Indian National Orchestra at AIR and composed for it; in his compositions he combined Western and classical Indian instrumentation. Beginning in the mid-1950s he composed the music for the Apu Trilogy by Satyajit Ray, which became internationally acclaimed. He was music director for several Hindi movies including Godaan and Anuradha.

=== 1956–1969 International performances ===
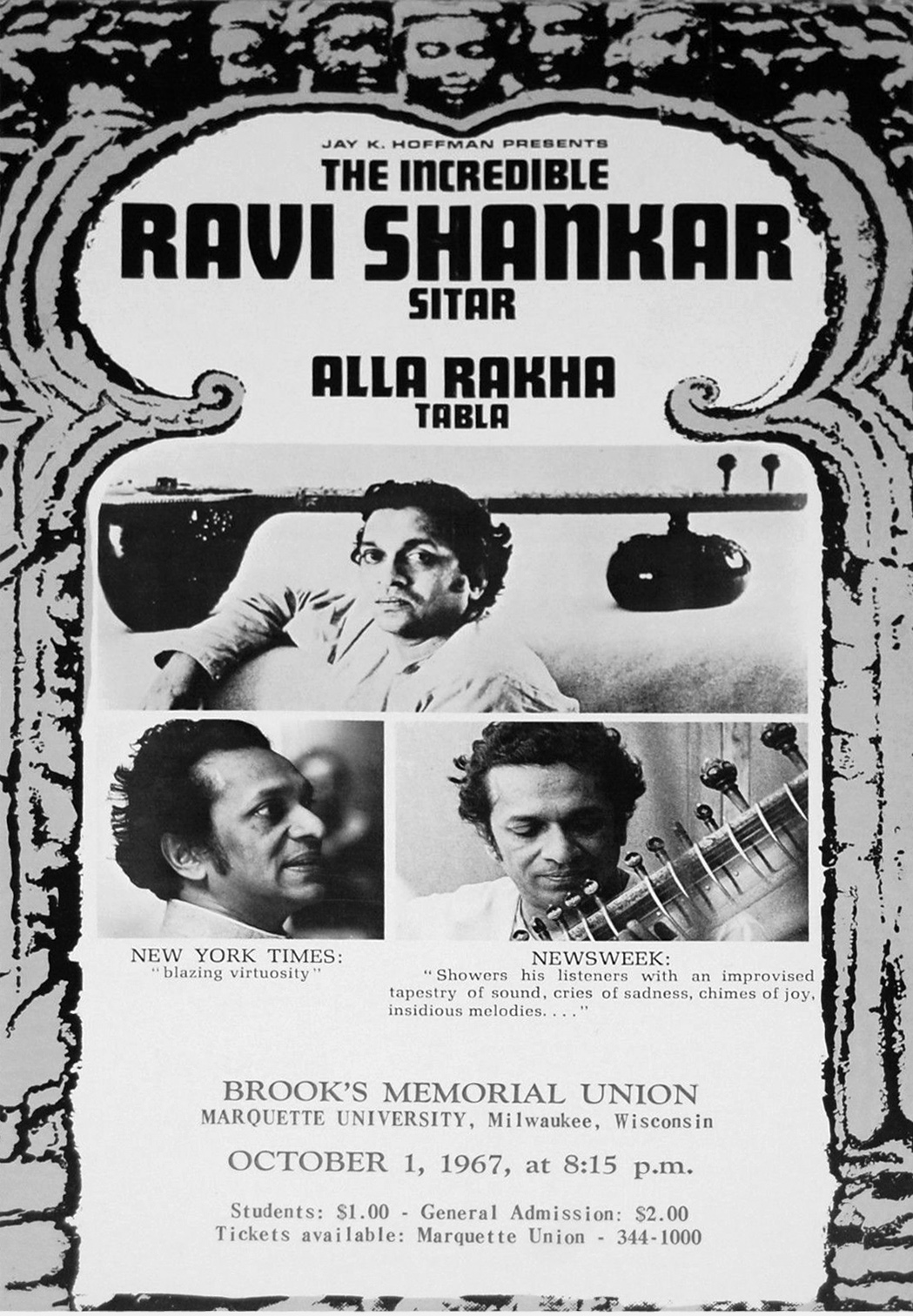
Concert flier, 1967

V. K. Narayana Menon, director of AIR Delhi, introduced the Western violinist Yehudi Menuhin to Shankar during Menuhin's first visit to India in 1952. Shankar had performed as part of a cultural delegation in the Soviet Union in 1954 and Menuhin invited Shankar in 1955 to perform in New York City for a demonstration of Indian classical music, sponsored by the Ford Foundation. (Note: Shankar declined to attend because of problems in his marriage, but recommended Ali Akbar Khan to play instead. Khan reluctantly accepted and performed with tabla (percussion) player Chatur Lal in the Museum of Modern Art, and he later became the first Indian classical musician to perform on American television and record a full raga performance, for Angel Records.)

Shankar heard about the positive response Khan received and resigned from AIR in 1956 to tour the United Kingdom, Germany, and the United States. He played for smaller audiences and educated them about Indian music, incorporating ragas from the South Indian Carnatic music in his performances, and recorded his first LP album Three Ragas in London, released in 1956. In 1958, Shankar participated in the celebrations of the 10th anniversary of the United Nations and UNESCO music festival in Paris. From 1961, he toured Europe, the United States, and Australia, and became the first Indian to compose music for non-Indian films. (Note: Chatur Lal accompanied Shankar on tabla until 1962, when Alla Rakha assumed the role.) Shankar founded the Kinnara School of Music in Mumbai in 1962.

Shankar befriended Richard Bock, founder of World Pacific Records, on his first American tour and recorded most of his albums in the 1950s and 1960s for Bock's label. The Byrds recorded at the same studio and heard Shankar's music, which led them to incorporate some of its elements in theirs, introducing the genre to their friend George Harrison of the Beatles. In 1967, Shankar performed a well-received set at the Monterey Pop Festival. While complimentary of the talents of several of the rock artists at the festival, he said he was "horrified" to see Jimi Hendrix set fire to his guitar on stage: "That was too much for me. In our culture, we have such respect for musical instruments, they are like part of God." Shankar's live album from Monterey peaked at number 43 on Billboard's pop LPs chart in the US, which remains the highest placing he achieved on that chart.

Shankar won a Grammy Award for Best Chamber Music Performance for West Meets East, a collaboration with Yehudi Menuhin. He opened a Western branch of the Kinnara School of Music in Los Angeles, in May 1967, and published an autobiography, My Music, My Life, in 1968. In 1968, he composed the score for the film Charly.

He performed at the Woodstock Festival in August 1969, and found he disliked the venue. In the late 1960s, Shankar distanced himself from the hippie movement and drug culture. He explained during an interview:

It makes me feel rather hurt when I see the association of drugs with our music. The music to us is religion. The quickest way to reach godliness is through music. I don't like the association of one bad thing with the music.

=== 1970–2012: International performances ===
In October 1970, Shankar became chair of the Department of Indian Music of the California Institute of the Arts after previously teaching at the City College of New York, the University of California, Los Angeles, and being guest lecturer at other colleges and universities, including the Ali Akbar College of Music. In late 1970, the London Symphony Orchestra invited Shankar to compose a concerto with sitar. Concerto for Sitar & Orchestra was performed with André Previn as conductor and Shankar playing the sitar. (Note: Hans Neuhoff of Musik in Geschichte und Gegenwart has criticized the usage of the orchestra in this concerto as "amateurish".) Shankar performed at the Concert for Bangladesh in August 1971, held at Madison Square Garden in New York. After the musicians had tuned up on stage for over a minute, the crowd of rock-music fans broke into applause, to which the amused Shankar responded, "If you like our tuning so much, I hope you will enjoy the playing more," which confused the audience. Still, the audience received the subsequent performance well. Although interest in Indian music had decreased in the early 1970s, the live album from the concert became one of the best-selling recordings to feature the genre and won Shankar a second Grammy Award.

As for Shankar and the sitar, they are extensions one of the other, each seeming to enter into the other's soul in one of the world's supreme musical arts. It is a thing inimitable, beyond words and forever new. For, as Shankar explained, 90 percent of all the music played was improvised.

— Paul Hume, music editor for Washington Post

In November and December 1974, Shankar co-headlined a North American tour with George Harrison. The demanding schedule weakened his health, and he suffered a heart attack in Chicago, causing him to miss a portion of the tour. (Note: In his absence, Shankar's sister-in-law, singer Lakshmi Shankar, conducted the touring orchestra.) Harrison, Shankar and members of the touring band visited the White House on invitation of John Gardner Ford, son of US president Gerald Ford. Shankar toured and taught for the remainder of the 1970s and the 1980s and released his second concerto, Raga Mala, conducted by Zubin Mehta, in 1981. Shankar was nominated for an Academy Award for Best Original Music Score for his work on the 1982 movie Gandhi. (Note: Shankar lost to John Williams' ET)

He performed in Moscow in 1988, with 140 musicians, including the Russian Folk Ensemble and members of the Moscow Philharmonic, along with his own group of Indian musicians.

He served as a member of the Rajya Sabha, the upper chamber of the Parliament of India, from 12 May 1986 to 11 May 1992, after being nominated by Indian Prime Minister Rajiv Gandhi. Shankar composed the dance drama Ghanashyam in 1989. His liberal views on musical co-operation led him to contemporary composer Philip Glass, with whom he released an album, Passages, in 1990, in a project initiated by Peter Baumann of the band Tangerine Dream.

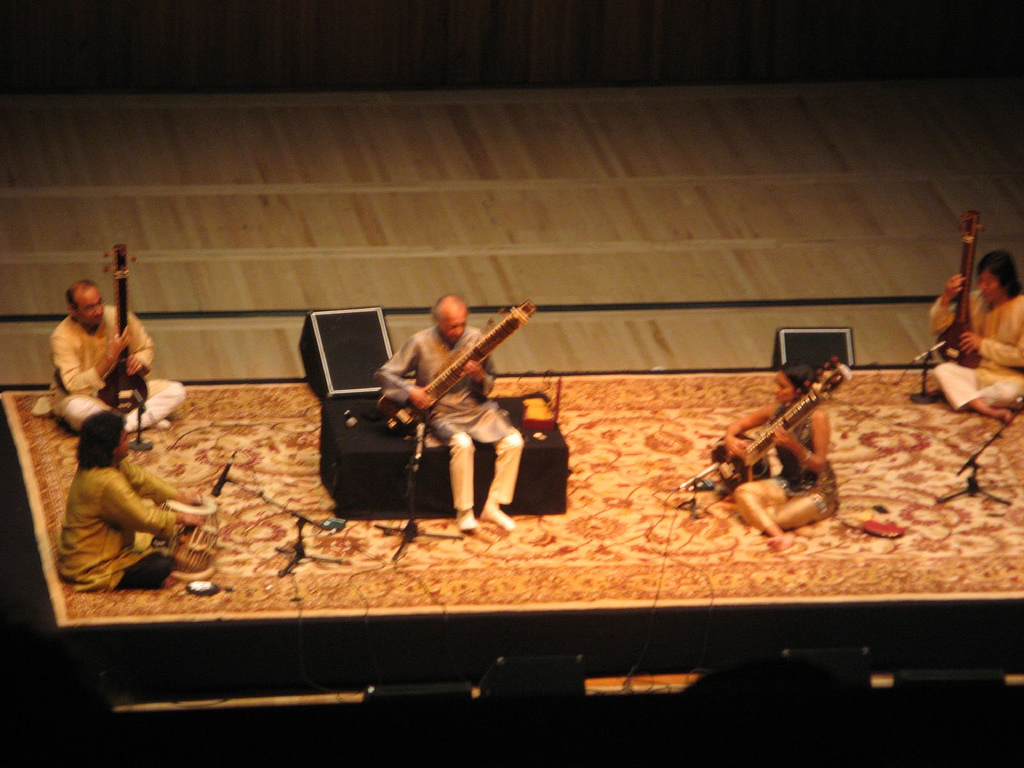
Shankar performing with Anoushka Shankar in 2007

Because of the positive response to Shankar's 1996 career compilation In Celebration, Shankar wrote a second autobiography, Raga Mala. He performed between 25 and 40 concerts every year during the late 1990s. Shankar taught his daughter Anoushka Shankar to play sitar and in 1997 became a Regents' Professor at University of California, San Diego.

He performed with Anoushka for the BBC in 1997 at the Symphony Hall in Birmingham, England. In the 2000s, he won a Grammy Award for Best World Music Album for Full Circle: Carnegie Hall 2000 and toured with Anoushka, who released a book about her father, Bapi: Love of My Life, in 2002. (Note: Anoushka performed a composition by Shankar for the 2002 Harrison memorial Concert for George and Shankar wrote a third concerto for sitar and orchestra for Anoushka and the Orpheus Chamber Orchestra.) After George Harrison's death in 2001, Shankar performed at the Concert for George, a celebration of Harrison's music staged at the Royal Albert Hall in London in 2002.

In June 2008, Shankar played what was billed as his last European concert, but his 2011 tour included dates in the United Kingdom.

On 1 July 2010, at the Southbank Centre's Royal Festival Hall, London, England, Anoushka Shankar, on sitar, performed with the London Philharmonic Orchestra, conducted by David Murphy, which was billed the first Symphony by Ravi Shankar. (Note: This performance was recorded and is available on CD. The website of the Ravi Shankar Foundation provides the information that "The symphony was written in Indian notation in 2010, and has been interpreted by his student and conductor, David Murphy." The information available on the website does not explain this process of "interpretation" of Ravi Shankar's notation by David Murphy, nor how Ravi Shankar's Indian notation could accommodate Western orchestral writing.)

=== Collaboration with George Harrison ===
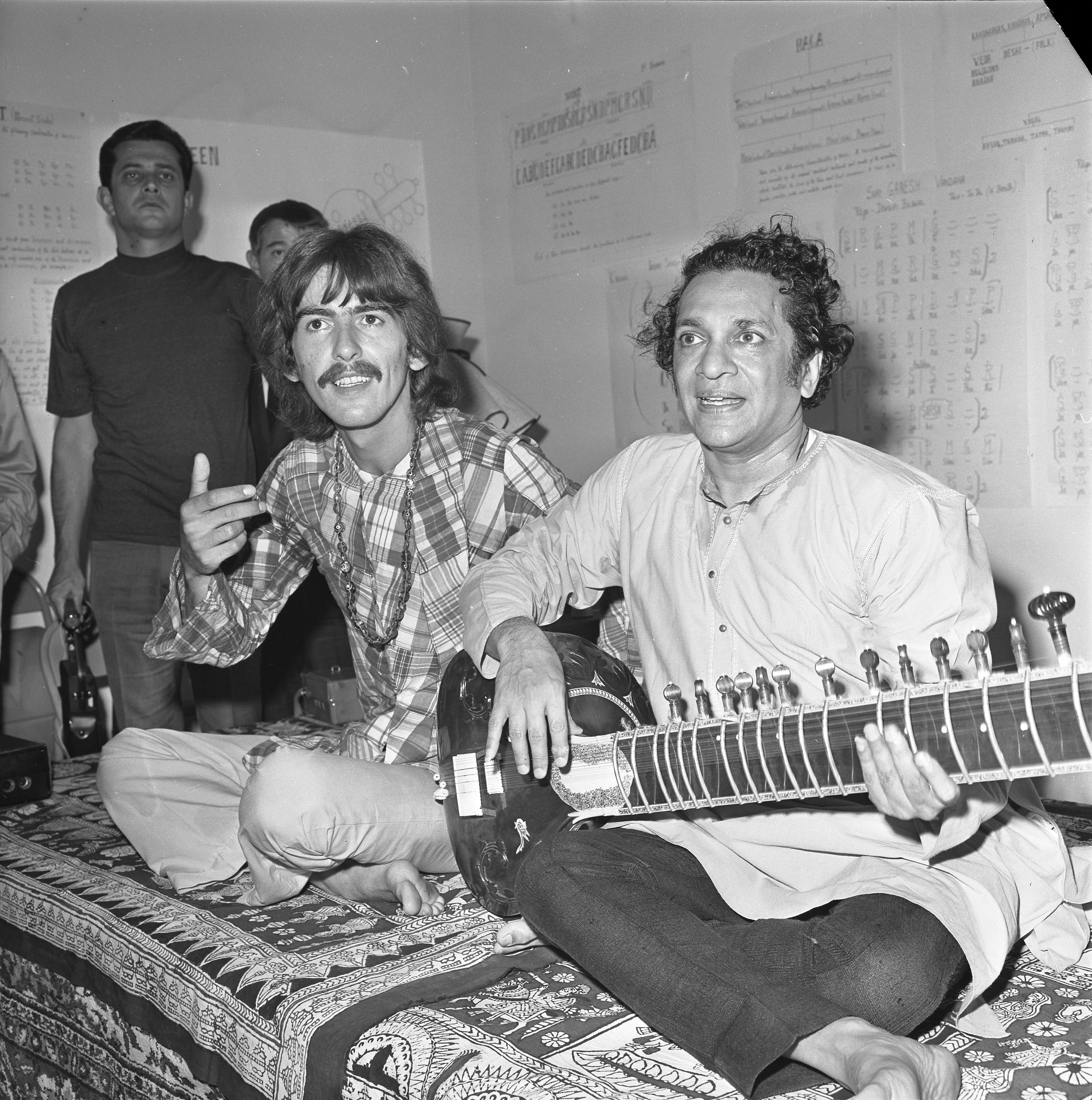
George Harrison and Ravi Shankar in 1967

The Beatles' guitarist George Harrison, who was first introduced to Shankar's music by the American singers Roger McGuinn and David Crosby, themselves big fans of Shankar, became influenced by Shankar's music. Harrison went on to help popularize Shankar and the use of Indian instruments in pop music throughout the 1960s. Olivia Harrison explains:

When George heard Indian music, that really was the trigger, it was like a bell that went off in his head. It not only awakened a desire to hear more music, but also to understand what was going on in Indian philosophy. It was a unique diversion.

Harrison became interested in Indian classical music, bought a sitar and used it to record the song "Norwegian Wood (This Bird Has Flown)". In 1968, he went to India to take lessons from Shankar, some of which were captured on film. This led to the use of Indian music by other musicians and popularised the raga rock trend. As the sitar and Indian music grew in popularity, groups such as the Rolling Stones, the Animals and the Byrds began using it in some of their songs. The influence even extended to blues musicians such as Michael Bloomfield, who created a raga-influenced improvisation number, "East-West" (Bloomfield scholars have cited its working title as "The Raga" when Bloomfield and his collaborator Nick Gravenites began to develop the idea) for the Butterfield Blues Band in 1966.

I think Ravi was rather taken aback, because he was a classical musician, and rock and roll was really out of his sphere. He thought it rather amusing that George took to him so much, but he and George really bonded. Ravi realised that it wasn't just a fashion for George, that he had dedication. Ravi had such integrity, and was someone to be respected, and at the same time huge fun. George hadn't really met anyone like that, and he really encouraged his interest.

— Patti Boyd

Harrison met Shankar in London in June 1966 and visited India later that year for six weeks to study sitar under Shankar in Srinagar. During the visit, a documentary film about Shankar named Raga was shot by Howard Worth and released in 1971. Shankar's association with Harrison greatly increased Shankar's popularity, and decades later Ken Hunt of AllMusic wrote that Shankar had become "the most famous Indian musician on the planet" by 1966.

George Harrison organized the charity Concert for Bangladesh in August 1971, in which Shankar participated. During the 1970s, Shankar and Harrison worked together again, recording Shankar Family & Friends in 1973 and touring North America the following year to a mixed response after Shankar had toured Europe with the Harrison-sponsored Music Festival from India. Shankar wrote a second autobiography, Raga Mala, with Harrison as editor.

== Style and contributions ==
Shankar plays the raga Madhuvanti at the Shiraz Arts Festival in Iran in the 1970s

Shankar developed a style distinct from that of his contemporaries and incorporated influences from rhythm practices of Carnatic music. His performances begin with solo alap, jor, and jhala (introduction and performances with pulse and rapid pulse) influenced by the slow and serious dhrupad genre, followed by a section with tabla accompaniment featuring compositions associated with the prevalent khyal style. Shankar often closed his performances with a piece inspired by the light-classical thumri genre.

Shankar has been considered one of the top sitar players of the second half of the 20th century. He popularised performing on the bass octave of the sitar for the alap section and became known for a distinctive playing style in the middle and high registers that used quick and short deviations of the playing string and his sound creation through stops and strikes on the main playing string. Narayana Menon of The New Grove Dictionary noted Shankar's fondness for rhythmic novelties, among them the use of unconventional rhythmic cycles. Hans Neuhoff of Musik in Geschichte und Gegenwart has argued that Shankar's playing style was not widely adopted and that he was surpassed by other sitar players in the performance of melodic passages. Shankar's interplay with Alla Rakha improved appreciation for tabla playing in Hindustani classical music. Shankar promoted the jugalbandi duet concert style. Shankar introduced at least 31 new ragas, including Nat Bhairav, Ahir Lalit, Rasiya, Yaman Manjh, Gunji Kanhara, Janasanmodini, Tilak Shyam, Bairagi, Mohan Kauns, Manamanjari, Mishra Gara, Pancham Se Gara, Purvi Kalyan, Kameshwari, Gangeshwari, Rangeshwari, Parameshwari, Palas Kafi, Jogeshwari, Charu Kauns, Kaushik Todi, Bairagi Todi, Bhawani Bhairav, Sanjh Kalyan, Shailangi, Suranjani, Rajya Kalyan, Banjara, Piloo Banjara, Suvarna, Doga Kalyan, Nanda Dhwani, and Natacharuka (for Anoushka). In 2011, at a concert recorded and released in 2012 as Tenth Decade in Concert: Ravi Shankar Live in Escondido, Shankar introduced a new percussive sitar technique called Goonga Sitar, whereby the strings are muffled with a cloth.

== Awards ==
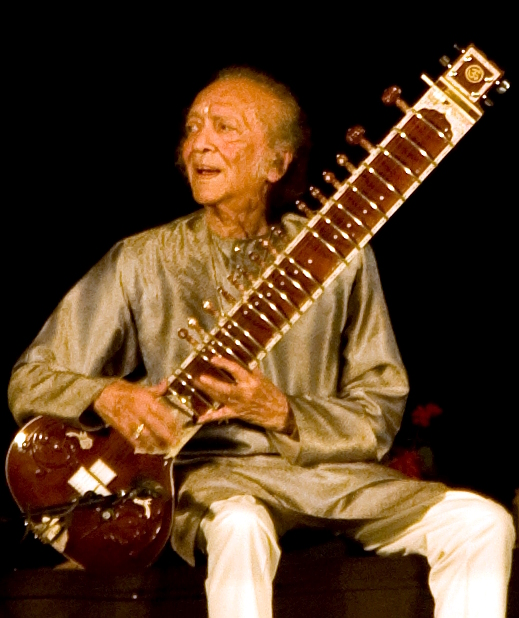
Ravi Shankar in Delhi in 2009

=== Indian government honours ===
- Bharat Ratna (1999)
- Padma Vibhushan (1981)
- Padma Bhushan (1967)
- Sangeet Natak Akademi Award (1962)
- Sangeet Natak Akademi Fellowship (1975)
- Kalidas Samman from the Government of Madhya Pradesh for 1987–88

=== Other governmental and academic honours ===
- Ramon Magsaysay Award (1992)
- Commander of the Legion of Honour of France (2000)
- Honorary Knight Commander of the Order of the British Empire (KBE) for "services to music" (2001)
- Honorary degrees from universities in India and the United States.
- Honorary member of the American Academy of Arts and Letters
- Honorary Doctor of Laws from the University of Melbourne, Australia (2010)

=== Arts awards ===
- 1964 fellowship from the John D. Rockefeller 3rd Fund
- Silver Bear Extraordinary Prize of the Jury at the 1957 Berlin International Film Festival (for composing the music for the movie Kabuliwala).
- UNESCO International Music Council (1975)
- Fukuoka Asian Culture Prize (1991)
- Praemium Imperiale for music from the Japan Art Association (1997)
- Polar Music Prize (1998)
- Four Grammy Awards
  - 1967: Best Chamber Music Performance – West Meets East (with Yehudi Menuhin)
  - 1973: Album of the Year – The Concert for Bangladesh (with George Harrison)
  - 2002: Best World Music Album – Full Circle: Carnegie Hall 2000
  - 2013: Best World Music Album – The Living Room Sessions Pt. 1
  - Lifetime Achievement Award received at the 55th Annual Grammy Awards
- Nominated for an Academy Award for Best Original Score, along with George Fenton, for Gandhi.
- Posthumous nomination in the 56th Annual Grammy Awards for his album "The Living Room Sessions Part 2".
- First recipient of the Tagore Award in recognition of his outstanding contribution to cultural harmony and universal values (2013; posthumous)

=== Other honours and tributes ===
- 1997 James Parks Morton Interfaith Award
- American jazz saxophonist John Coltrane named his son Ravi Coltrane after Shankar.
- On 7 April 2016 (his 96th birthday), Google published a Google Doodle to honour his work. Google commented: "Shankar evangelized the use of Indian instruments in Western music, introducing the atmospheric hum of the sitar to audiences worldwide. Shankar's music popularized the fundamentals of Indian music, including raga, a melodic form and widely influenced popular music in the 1960s and 70s.".
- In September 2014, a postage stamp featuring Shankar was released by India Post commemorating his contributions.

== Personal life and family ==
In 1941, Shankar married Annapurna Devi (Roshanara Khan), daughter of musician Allauddin Khan. Their son, Shubhendra "Shubho" Shankar, was born in 1942. He separated from Devi in 1962 and continued a relationship with dancer Kamala Shastri, a relationship that had begun in the late 1940s.

An affair with Sue Jones, a New York concert producer, led to the birth of Norah Jones in 1979. He separated from Shastri in 1981 and lived with Jones until 1986.

He began an affair in 1978 with married tanpura player Sukanya Rajan, whom he had known since 1972, which led to the birth of their daughter Anoushka Shankar in 1981. In 1989, he married Sukanya Rajan at Chilkur Temple in Hyderabad.

Shankar's son, Shubhendra, often accompanied him on tours. He could play the sitar and surbahar but elected not to pursue a solo career. Shubhendra died of pneumonia in 1992.

Ananda Shankar, the experimental fusion musician, was his nephew.

His daughter Norah Jones became a successful musician, winning five Grammy Awards in 2003 and overall ten Grammy Awards as of 2025.

His daughter Anoushka Shankar was nominated for a Grammy Award for Best World Music Album in 2003. Anoushka and her father were both nominated for Best World Music Album at the 2013 Grammy Awards for separate albums.

Shankar was a Hindu, and a devotee of the Hindu god Hanuman. He was also an "ardent devotee" of the Bengali Hindu saint, Sri Anandamayi Ma. Shankar used to visit Anandamayi Ma frequently and performed for her on various occasions. Shankar wrote of his hometown, Benares (Varanasi) and his initial encounter with "Ma":

Varanasi is the eternal abode of Lord Shiva and one of my favorite temples is that of Lord Hanuman. The city is also where one of the miracles that have happened in my life took place: I met Ma Anandamayi, a great spiritual soul. Seeing the beauty of her face and mind, I became her ardent devotee. Sitting at home now in Encinitas in Southern California at the age of 88, surrounded by the beautiful greens, multi-colored flowers, blue sky, clean air and the Pacific Ocean, I often reminisce about all the wonderful places I have seen in the world. I cherish the memories of Paris, New York and a few other places. But Varanasi seems to be etched in my heart!

Shankar was a vegetarian. He wore a large diamond ring that he said was manifested by Sathya Sai Baba. He lived with Sukanya in Encinitas, California.

Shankar performed his final concert with daughter Anoushka on 4 November 2012 at the Terrace Theater in Long Beach, California. Last Concert

== Illness and death ==
On 9 December 2012, Shankar was admitted to Scripps Memorial Hospital in La Jolla, San Diego, California, after having complained of breathing difficulties. He died on 11 December 2012 at around 16:30 PST at age 92 after undergoing heart valve replacement surgery.

The Swara Samrat festival, organized on 5–6 January 2013 and dedicated to Ravi Shankar and Ali Akbar Khan, included performances by such musicians as Shivkumar Sharma, Birju Maharaj, Hariprasad Chaurasia, Zakir Hussain, and Girija Devi.

== Books ==
- Shankar, Ravi (1968). My Music, My Life. New York: Simon & Schuster. ISBN 0-671-20113-1.
- —— (1979). Learning Indian Music: A Systematic Approach. Lauderdale: Onomatopoeia. OCLC 21376688.
- —— (1997). Raga Mala: The Autobiography of Ravi Shankar. Guildford: Genesis Publications. ISBN 0-904351-46-7.
