= West Meets East =

Studio album by Yehudi Menuhin and Ravi Shankar
- Released: January 1967
- Recorded: 1966
- Genre: Hindustani classical
- Length: 48:47
- Label: His Master's Voice (UK), Angel Records (US)

Yehudi Menuhin and Ravi Shankar chronology
West Meets East (1967)	West Meets East, Volume 2 (1968)

Professional ratings
Review scores
Source	Rating
AllMusic	4.5/5 stars

West Meets East is an album by American violinist Yehudi Menuhin and Indian sitar virtuoso Ravi Shankar, first released in the United Kingdom by His Master's Voice in January 1967. It was recorded following their successful duet in June 1966 at the Bath Musical Festival, where they had played some of the same material.

The album was issued in the United States on EMI's Angel Records imprint in June 1967. West Meets East was number 1 on Billboard's Best Selling Classical LP's list for eighteen weeks in 1967 and continued to top that chart through January the following year. It also placed on the mainstream national chart (later the Billboard 200), where it peaked at number 161. In February 1968, the album won the 1967 Grammy Award for Best Chamber Music Performance, the first time that an Asian musician had won a Grammy. This recognition coincided with a period of heightened interest in Indian classical music, and particularly Shankar, as Western pop and rock bands such as the Beatles, the Byrds, the Rolling Stones and Traffic all adopted sitar or other aspects of the genre into their sound.

In July 1968, Angel Records announced that West Meets East was the fastest selling LP in the history of the label. The album was the first in a trilogy of "West Meets East" collaborations by Menuhin and Shankar, volumes two and three appearing in 1968 and 1976, respectively. The friendship between the two musicians had begun in India in the early 1950s, after which Menuhin had done much to introduce Western audiences to Indian music.

== Musical content ==
On the recording, the main performers are accompanied at various points by tabla player Alla Rakha; Menuhin's sister, pianist Hephzibah Menuhin; and Prodyot Sen, on tambura. In addition to Shankar's and Menuhin's liner notes on the album sleeve, musician John Barham supplied a glossary, explaining musical terms such as alap, gat and tala. At the Bath Festival, Barham had translated Shankar's interpretation of Raga Tilang into Western annotation for Menuhin's benefit. When making West Meets East, Shankar rewrote this Tilang-based piece, recording it with Menuhin as "Swara Kakali". The album's opening selection is "Prabhati", a Shankar composition based on Raga Gunakali, and played by Menuhin and Rakha.

The fourth selection, filling side two in the LP format, is "Sonata for Violin & Piano No. 3 in A minor, Op. 25", featuring Hephzibah Menuhin. This piece was written by Romanian composer George Enescu, who had been Yehudi Menuhin's teacher.

== Track listing ==
All selections by Ravi Shankar except where noted.

=== Side one ===
1. "Prabhati" – 4:08
2. "Raga Puriya Kalyan" – 11:45
3. "Swara Kakali (based on Raga Tilang)" – 8:46

=== Side two ===
1. "Sonata for Violin & Piano No. 3 in A minor, Op. 25" (George Enescu) – 24:08

== Personnel ==
- Yehudi Menuhin – violin
- Ravi Shankar – sitar, musical arrangements
- Alla Rakha – tabla
- Hephzibah Menuhin – piano
- Prodyot Sen – tambura

== See also ==
- Hindustani music

== Sources ==
- Peter Lavezzoli, The Dawn of Indian Music in the West, Continuum (New York, NY, 2006; ISBN 0-8264-2819-3).
- Ravi Shankar, My Music, My Life, Mandala Publishing (San Rafael, CA, 2007; ISBN 978-1-60109-005-8).
- Ravi Shankar, Raga Mala: The Autobiography of Ravi Shankar, Welcome Rain (New York, NY, 1999; ISBN 1-56649-104-5).
- World Music: The Rough Guide (Volume 2: Latin and North America, Caribbean, India, Asia and Pacific), Rough Guides/Penguin (London, 2000; ISBN 1-85828-636-0).
