= Ravi Shankar's Music Festival from India =

1976 album by Ravi Shankar

Ravi Shankar's Music Festival from India tour of Europe
- Tour by Ravi Shankar
- Start date: 23 September 1974
- End date: mid October 1974

Ravi Shankar concert chronology
- Music Festival from India tour of Europe; George Harrison and Ravi Shankar's 1974 North American tour

Ravi Shankar's Music Festival from India

Studio album by Ravi Shankar
- Released: 6 February 1976
- Recorded: August−September 1974
- Studios: FPSHOT, Oxfordshire
- Genre: Hindustani classical
- Length: 47:23
- Label: Dark Horse
- Producer: George Harrison

Ravi Shankar chronology
Shankar Family & Friends (1974)	Ravi Shankar's Music Festival from India (1976)

Ravi Shankar's Music Festival from India was an Indian classical music revue led by sitarist and composer Ravi Shankar intended for Western concert audiences and performed in 1974. Its presentation was the first project undertaken by the Material World Charitable Foundation, set up the previous year by ex-Beatle George Harrison. Long a champion of Indian music, Harrison also produced an eponymous studio album by the Music Festival orchestra, which was released in 1976 on his Dark Horse record label. Both the CD format of the Ravi Shankar's Music Festival from India album and a DVD of their performance at the Royal Albert Hall in London were issued for the first time on the 2010 Shankar–Harrison box set Collaborations.

The sixteen members of Shankar's Music Festival from India included Hariprasad Chaurasia, Shivkumar Sharma, Alla Rakha, T.V. Gopalkrishnan, L. Subramaniam, Sultan Khan and Lakshmi Shankar. Several of the musicians began successful international careers as a result of their participation, and all are recognised as being among the late twentieth century's finest exponents of Indian classical music. The ensemble played in Europe in September and October 1974 before touring North America with Harrison and his band during the final two months of the year.

== Background and concept ==
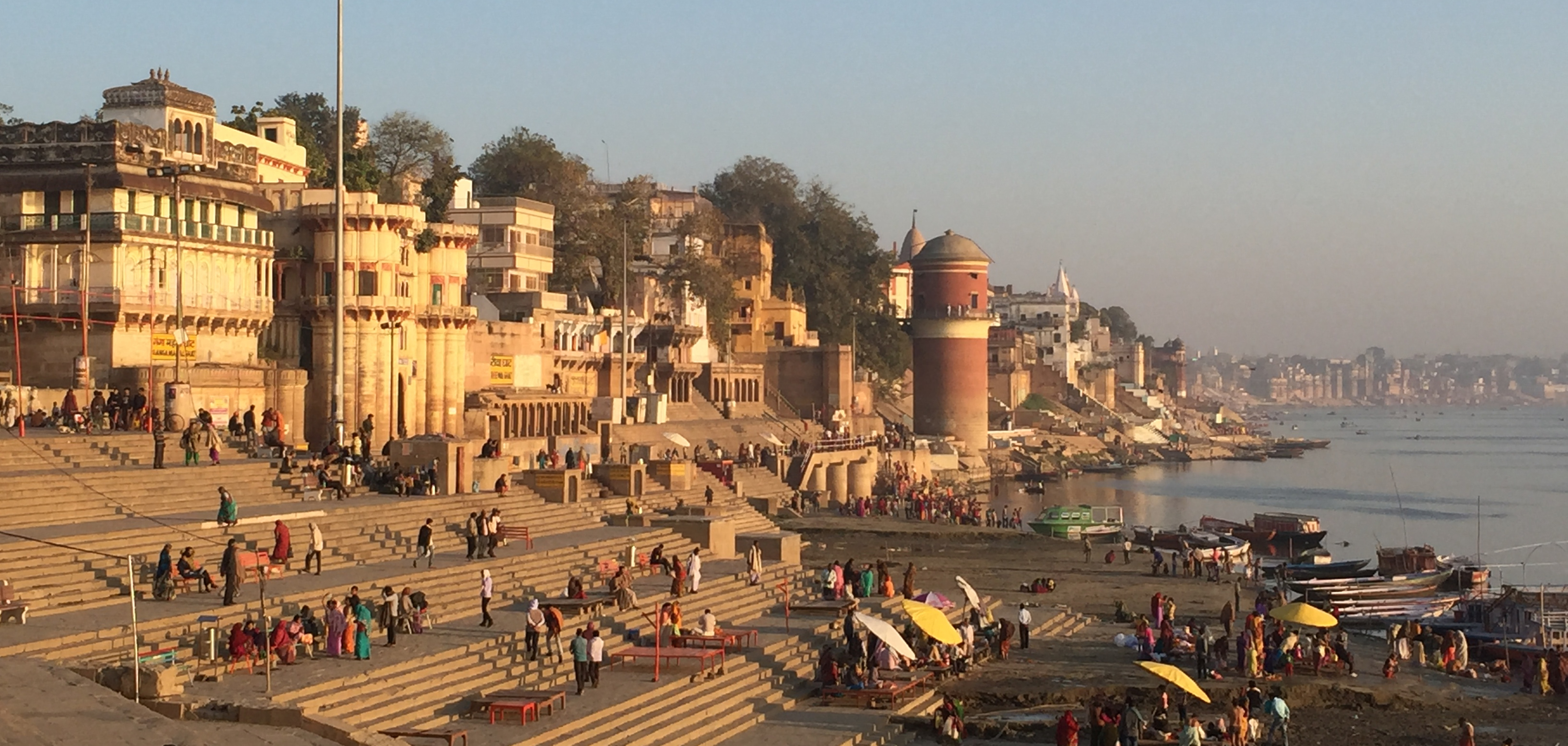
Present-day Benares (Varanasi). The plan for the Music Festival from India came about when George Harrison visited Shankar at his riverfront house in Benares in January 1974.

Although he had composed and performed orchestral works in India, as All India Radio's music director between 1949 and 1956, Ravi Shankar's only similar project for Western audiences had been when he toured America with his Festival from India orchestra in 1968. The tour featured musicians such as Shivkumar Sharma, Jitendra Abhisheki and Palghat Raghu, with Shankar's regular jugalbandi partner, sarodya Ali Akbar Khan, joining the ensemble for their concerts in California. The plan for the larger Music Festival from India took shape in January 1974, when his friend George Harrison visited Shankar in his home town of Benares. Harrison attended a religious ceremony in honour of Shankar's new home, Hemangana, beside the River Ganges at Benares, after which he suggested that Shankar assemble an orchestra for concert tours of Europe and the United States. According to Harrison, the Music Festival was something that he himself had been wanting to stage "since about '67". He was particularly inspired after hearing Shankar's orchestral piece Nava Rasa Ranga while in Bombay, where Harrison had recorded part of his 1968 solo album Wonderwall Music.

Unlike the Harrison-produced Shankar Family & Friends, a cross-cultural project recorded in 1973, the focus behind the new collaboration was to celebrate the traditional aspects of Indian classical music, both in concerts performed by the sixteen-piece Music Festival orchestra and in the studio. Shankar would act as composer and conductor, rather than musician, and only play sitar on his famed ragas during the live performances. The presentation of the Music Festival was the first project undertaken by Harrison under the auspices of his Material World Charitable Foundation, one of the aims of which was to "sponsor diverse forms of artistic expression and to encourage the exploration of alternative life views and philosophies".

== Musicians ==
Shankar collaborated with a mix of new and familiar artists. Many of the players he had a musical history with already. Almost all of the artists in the collaboration had successfully published Indian classical music – flautist Hariprasad Chaurasia, tabla legend Alla Rakha, T.V. Gopalkrishnan on mridangam and vocals, South Indian violin virtuoso L. Subramaniam, sarangi master Sultan Khan, santoor pioneer Shivkumar Sharma, and Gopal Krishan, credited with the emergence of the vichitra veena in that musical genre. A sitarist and percussion player, Harihar Rao had been a student of Shankar's during the 1950s before winning a Fulbright scholarship and taking a position in the ethnomusicology department of the University of California, Los Angeles (UCLA).

The featured singer was once more Lakshmi Shankar, Shankar's sister-in-law and a noted Hindustani vocalist. Like Sharma, Rakha and Lakshmi had been among the members of Shankar's 1968 revue. For the first time in one of his projects, Shankar invited his niece Viji (Lakshmi's daughter), who joined her aunt, Kamala Chakravarty, as second vocalists to Lakshmi.

== Rehearsals and recording ==
Shankar and Harrison met again during the summer of 1974, in England, where Harrison arranged a house in London's Belgravia area for Shankar and the latter's partner, Chakravarty, while the other musicians were accommodated at the Imperial Hotel in Henley-on-Thames, west of London. Harrison had the orchestra personnel picked up from the hotel each day in a Mercedes stretch limousine previously owned by John Lennon and Yoko Ono. He later recalled the amusing sight of Rakha and the other traditionally dressed Indian musicians as they exited the vehicle on arrival at his Henley home, Friar Park.

Shankar composed new material specifically for the Music Festival and recorded it using Harrison's 16-track home studio facility, FPSHOT. Describing himself as "an improviser by nature", every day for three weeks Shankar would leave London and head west on the M4, during which he would write the music to be run through with the musicians that day in Friar Park's grand drawing room. Harrison remarked of the process: "It was amazing, because he'd sit there and say to one person, 'This is where you play,' and the next one, 'And you do this,' and 'You do that,' and they're all going, What? 'OK, one, two, three ...' And you'd think, 'This is going to be a catastrophe' – and it would be the most amazing thing." The principal sound engineer on the sessions, and Harrison's regular engineer at FPSHOT during this period, was Shankar's nephew Kumar, with Phil McDonald assisting on "Raga Jait" and "Naderdani". Kumar Shankar joined the cast for publicity photos taken by Clive Arrowsmith in the house and grounds.

The orchestra rehearsed for their upcoming live performances at Friar Park also. Midway through the proceedings, on 6 September, Harrison held a press conference in London and announced plans for the Ravi Shankar's Music Festival from India tour of Europe, lasting through into October. A co-headlining North American tour would follow, for which Harrison, as the main attraction, was growing increasingly unprepared, such was his dedication to this project, and after having already lavished months of his time on The Place I Love by Splinter, another Dark Horse act.

== Performance history ==
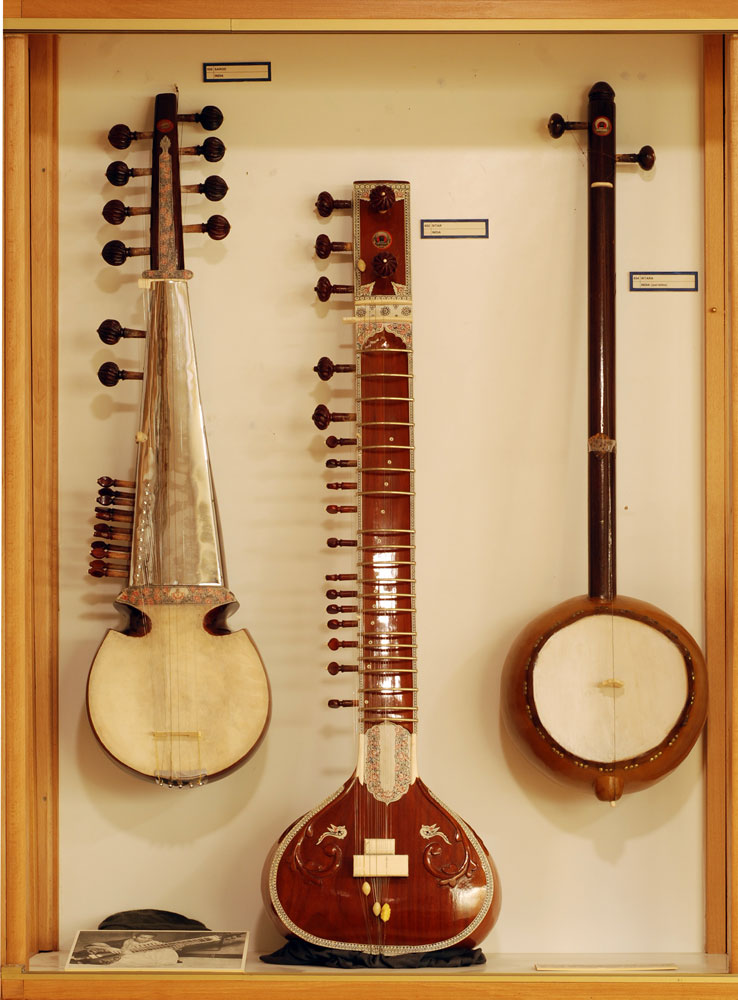
Examples of three of the string instruments used in the Music Festival from India – sarod, sitar and ektara

The programme for the concert performances was divided into two distinct parts. Shankar explained at the time:

The first part is in the form of a panorama, depicting major stages in the evolution of classical and traditional Indian music, starting with the Vedic hymns and the music of the medieval period, and ending with the present day, touching briefly on all the intermediate forms such as alap, dhrupad, dhamar, khyal, tappa, tarana and chaturanga ... The second part begins with the semi-classical forms such as the devotional bhajan and the romantic and erotic thumri, ghazal, dadra, etc. and ends with the very lively and earthy folk style.

True to the festival's title, the folk traditions of all the various regions of India were represented, in what was the first appearance by an Indian orchestra in Europe. Similarly all-encompassing and educational were Naseem Khan's liner notes for the Ravi Shankar's Music Festival from India studio album, serving as an introductory guide to the wide variety of Indian musical instruments on display. The album would be issued long after the European tour, however, due to the release of Shankar Family & Friends in September 1974.

The Royal Albert Hall performance on 23 September was the Music Festival's opening night, after which the tour moved on to Paris, Brussels, Frankfurt, Munich and Copenhagen. Harrison took to the stage in London and admitted to "feeling very nervous ... we're behind schedule", before introducing Shankar to the audience. The Royal Albert Hall concert was filmed by Stuart Cooper, who had recently directed Harrison's Apple Films production Little Malcolm.

The brief European tour ended in October. The orchestra was then pared down to a sixteen-piece – omitting shehnai veteran Anant Lal and Kamala Chakravarty – for Shankar and Harrison's high-profile tour of the United States and Canada, which began at Vancouver's Pacific Coliseum on 2 November. Four days later, the tour played in San Francisco, where some of the Indian musicians were also invited to perform at the Stone House, a historic building in Fairfax in Marin County. Individual performances from this informal concert, by Sultan Khan and Hariprasad Chaurasia, were released on the albums Sarangi: The Music of India (1988) and Venu (1989). (Note: Co-produced by musician and ethnomusicologist Mickey Hart, the two albums were reissued in 2011 as part of his 25-disc Smithsonian Folkways collection.)

Shankar's ensemble faced some hostile audiences in North America, who were more interested in hearing Harrison's music during what was, in 1974, the first tour there by a former Beatle since the band's 1966 visit. Author Peter Lavezzoli views this outcome as "unfortunate", since Shankar "had assembled an outstanding group of musicians". Harrison biographer Simon Leng describes the orchestra as "the greatest collection of Indian musicians ever to tour America". Although the focus of Shankar's set on this tour was to promote Shankar Family & Friends, selections from the Music Festival programme such as "Naderdani" were adapted for American and Canadian audiences. Commenting on the lack of appreciation for the orchestra at some of the concerts, drummer Jim Keltner later said: "Those people saw something very special."

== Album release ==
Dark Horse Records issued the album Ravi Shankar's Music Festival from India in February 1976 (March in the UK), a year and a half after the recording sessions. The cover features a group photo of all the participants taken by Arrowsmith under a large cedar tree in the grounds of Friar Park. The back cover included a reproduction of the Music Festival tour poster designed by Jan Steward, who had created the cover for the 1968 Festival from India double album, among other works by Shankar.

Dark Horse produced a promotional film for the album. The film included footage of Harrison with a voiceover by Shankar discussing his role, and a spinning LP sleeve accompanied by portions of music from the album. The release coincided with a concert by Shankar at the Cathedral of St John the Divine in New York – a dawn-to-dusk recital celebrating twenty years of performances in the West by the artist.

Also in March 1976, the Californian television station KCET broadcast a 30-minute programme titled Ravi Shankar's Music Festival with George Harrison & Don Ellis. Produced by Taylor Hackford and filmed in Los Angeles in 1975, the show was hosted by Don Ellis, a pioneer in Indo jazz who had studied Indian music under Harihar Rao at UCLA. (Note: A trumpeter and composer, Ellis formed the Hindustani Jazz Sextet with Rao in 1964. The sextet also included percussionist Emil Richards, who played in Harrison's 1974 tour band and with Shankar's orchestra when the two ensembles performed together.) During the programme, Harrison discussed the Music Festival project and introduced film clips from the orchestra's Royal Albert Hall performance. Having already watched the film from the London concert in its entirety, Ellis described it as "one of the most extraordinary musical experiences that I've ever heard".

Writing about the 1974-recorded album in his book The Dawn of Indian Music in the West, Lavezzoli recognises the ten-minute "Raga Jait" as being among the highlights of the set. Speaking to Rolling Stone magazine in 1979, Harrison named the album and Shankar Family & Friends among his favourites of all the releases on Dark Horse.

== Reissue and legacy ==
With the album long out of print, selections from Ravi Shankar's Music Festival from India appeared on the Harrison-compiled box set Ravi Shankar: In Celebration (1996), issued by Dark Horse and Angel Records. The box set also featured the previously unreleased "Ta Na Tom", another piece recorded with the Music Festival personnel at Friar Park. Alan Kozlowski, who helped compile the box set, viewed the inclusion of tracks from Music Festival from India among the "prizes" offered by the compilation. In his review of In Celebration, Bruce Eder of AllMusic reserved especial praise for the fourth disc, which contains several of Shankar's collaborations with Harrison, writing: "From the opening 'Vandana', it draws us into a realm of music that is so sublimely beautiful that it makes everything that has come before it, in all its bejeweled splendor, seem almost plain and pale by comparison."

In 2010, Ravi Shankar's Music Festival from India was reissued on CD as part of the Shankar–Harrison box set Collaborations, coinciding with celebrations for Shankar's 90th birthday. Writing for AllMusic, Richie Unterberger considers Collaborations to be a "bountiful gathering of some of Shankar's more accessible recordings" that has "value not just for Beatles completists [through Harrison's involvement], but also for more general appreciators of traditional Indian music". Unterberger describes the Music Festival from India studio album as offering "a more diverse group of arrangements than is heard on many Indian recordings" and "[a] mood [that] is largely one of devout humility interspersed with some low-key, joyful boisterousness".

PopMatters contributing editor Sachyn Mital considers the album to be "lively and instrument focused", and writes of its music content: "'Bhajan' is a joyful chant to Krishna, Gopal and Govind, while 'Naderdani' has ... sitar evoking playfulness with masterful precision. 'Dehati' is a percussion showcase as the tabla players create two minutes of call and response near the end." While noting the "great integrity" behind the 2010 box set, Joe Marchese of The Second Disc writes of Ravi Shankar's Music Festival from India: "The album's sounds are exotic, but immediately transporting. Much of the music is joyful, such as 'Naderdani,' described as 'a contemporary composition for voice and instruments.'" Writing in Goldmine magazine, Gillian Gaar finds the album "mesmerizing", with "the female vocals having an uncanny ability to imitate the sitar (or vice versa)".

Nari, a 2015 multimedia project by singer and violinist Gingger Shankar (the daughter of Viji and L. Subramanium, and granddaughter of Lakshmi), was partly inspired by the 1974 Music Festival and the North American tour with Harrison. She said she created the project out of the belief that Lakshmi and Viji deserved more recognition for their respective roles in helping to popularise Indian music in the West.

== Music Festival from India – Live at the Royal Albert Hall DVD ==
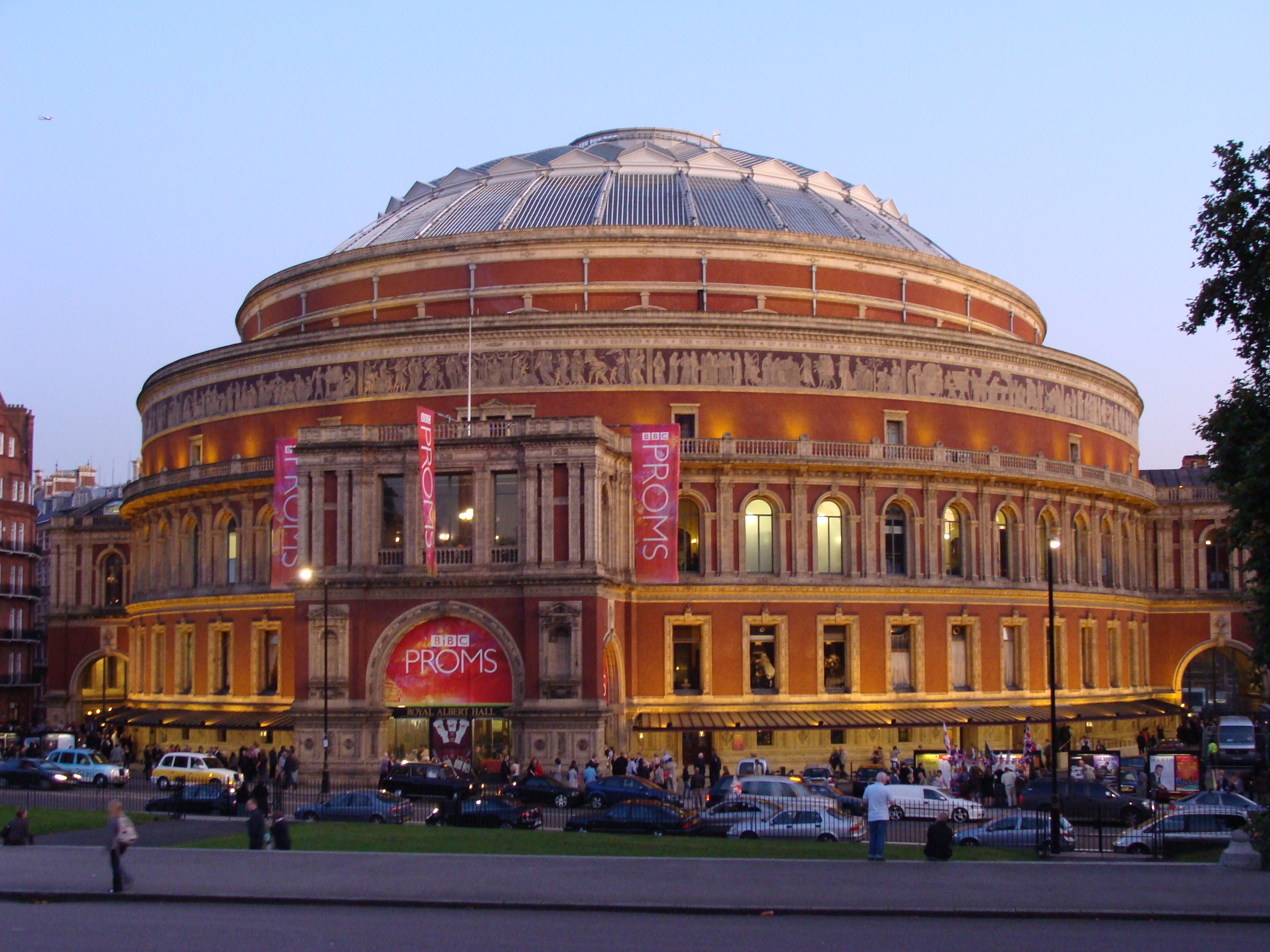
The Royal Albert Hall (pictured in 2008), the venue for the Music Festival's debut performance

Collaborations marked the first release for Stuart Cooper's concert film of the Music Festival from India, issued on DVD as disc four of the box set. The film was shot at the Royal Albert Hall on Monday, 23 September 1974. Text at the start of the DVD's "concert film" section explains that much restoration was needed on both footage and audio, the latter being overseen by producer Paul Hicks and by Shankar's daughter Anoushka Shankar. With some of Cooper's 35-year-old footage having been destroyed or mislaid, the remainder of the concert's sound is included in a separate, "concert audio" section. In her review for Goldmine, Gaar writes that, together with the Music Festival's studio album, the concert DVD features both "the most traditional Indian music" and "the most powerful performances" on Collaborations.

=== Film synopsis ===
The film opens with an image of a large red Om symbol on a yellow sheet, which provides a backdrop to the Albert Hall stage. George Harrison then walks on and gives a brief, warm introduction to Ravi Shankar, after which the Music Festival from India performance begins.

The stage is set with two large risers; the first in the shape of a square, the second, slightly more raised than the first one, is curved around behind it like a half-moon. On the square riser, from left to right, sit singers Viji Shankar, Lakshmi Shankar and Kamala Chakravarty, with percussionist Harihar Rao and bansuri player Hariprasad Chaurasia just behind them. Spread out along the crescent-shaped platform (from left to right) are three bowed string players, L. Subramaniam, Satyadev Pawar and Sultan Khan; Anant Lal, on shehnai; then the four drummers, T.V. Gopalkrishnan, Alla Rakha, Rijram Desad and Kamalesh Maitra, the last two partly surrounded by their tarangs (circles) of hand drums. Completing the ring of musicians along this curved riser is sitarist Kartick Kumar; Gopal Krishan, behind a raised vichitra veena; and finally Shivkumar Sharma, behind the large, harpsichord-like santoor. Shankar conducts the orchestra from just in front of the first riser, his back to the audience.

Midway through the film, the stage is cleared of all musicians except for four members of the orchestra and Shankar, who now plays sitar on the ensuing raga. After the customary slow alap section, Shankar's sitar trades musical phrases with Rakha's tabla, supported by Kumar and Rao, both on sitar, and Viji Shankar, playing the tambura. The whole ensemble then returns for further vocal and orchestral pieces, conducted by Shankar as before.

=== Bonus feature ===
The DVD's bonus feature, directed by David Kew, shows Hicks and Anoushka Shankar at work on the mix for pieces released in this concert film section. They are joined there at StudioWest, in San Diego, by Shankar himself and Harrison's widow, Olivia, allowing the 90-year-old Shankar to offer his input. At one point Anoushka covers her father's eyes playfully – in response, it seems, to his reaction at seeing himself on screen, performing some four decades before.

== Track listing ==
=== Studio album ===
All songs by Ravi Shankar.

Side one

1. "Vandana" – 2:44
2. "Dhamar" – 5:23
3. "Tarana / Chaturang" – 5:33
4. "Raga Jait" – 9:48

Side two

5. "Kajri" – 4:51
6. "Bhajan" – 3:56
7. "Naderdani" – 4:43
8. "Dehati" – 10:09

=== DVD "Concert film" ===
1. "Introduction by George Harrison"
2. "Hymns From the Vedas"
3. "Tappa (Raga Khamaj)"
4. "Tarana (Raga Kirwani)"
5. "Raga Jait"
6. "Vilambit Gat, Drut Gat and Jhala (Raga Yaman Kalyan)"
7. "Naderdani"
8. "Krishna Krishna Bhajan (based on Raga Pancham-se-gara)"
9. "Dehati"

=== DVD "Concert audio" ===
1. "Musicians Introduction"
2. "Vandana"
3. "Alap / Noom / Toom Jor (Raga Abhogi)"
4. "Dhamar (Raga Vasanta in Tala Dhamar)"
5. "Khyal (Raga Kedara in Tala Teental)"
6. "Tarana (Raga Kirwani in Tala Ektal)"
7. "Chaturang (Raga Yaman Kalyan in Tala Teental)"
8. "Kajri"
9. "Pallavi (Thani Avarthanam / Raga Bilahari in Tala Aditala)"
10. "Thumri (Mishra Piloo in Tala Jat)"
11. "Raga Mala (Garland of Ragas, based on Raga Khamaj in Tala Teental)"

== Personnel ==
- Ravi Shankar – direction, arrangements; sitar (DVD only)
- Lakshmi Shankar – vocals, swarmandal
- Alla Rakha – tabla
- T.V. Gopalkrishnan – vocals, mridangam, khanjira
- Hariprasad Chaurasia – bansuri
- Kartick Kumar – sitar
- Sultan Khan – sarangi
- Shivkumar Sharma – santoor, kanoon, backing vocals
- Gopal Krishan – vichitra veena, backing vocals
- L. Subramaniam – South Indian violin
- Satyadev Pawar – North Indian violin
- Rijram Desad – pakavaj, madal-tarang, dholki, nagada, huduk, duff
- Kamalesh Maitra – tabla-tarang, duggi-tarang, sarod, madal, ektara
- Anant Lal – shehnai
- Harihar Rao – kartal, manjira, dholak, gubgubbi, backing vocals; sitar (DVD only)
- Kamala Chakravarty – tambura, backing vocals
- Viji Shankar – tambura, backing vocals

== See also ==
- Raga
- In Concert 1972

== Sources ==
- Keith Badman, The Beatles Diary Volume 2: After the Break-Up 1970–2001, Omnibus Press (London, 2001; ISBN 0-7119-8307-0).
- Collaborations, book accompanying Collaborations box set (Dark Horse Records, 2010; produced by Olivia Harrison; package design by Drew Lorimer & Olivia Harrison).
- The Editors of Rolling Stone, Harrison, Rolling Stone Press/Simon & Schuster (New York, NY, 2002; ISBN 0-7432-3581-9).
- George Harrison, I Me Mine, Chronicle Books (San Francisco, CA, 2002; ISBN 0-8118-3793-9).
- Olivia Harrison, George Harrison: Living in the Material World, Abrams (New York, NY, 2011; ISBN 978-1-4197-0220-4).
- Peter Lavezzoli, The Dawn of Indian Music in the West, Continuum (New York, NY, 2006; ISBN 0-8264-2819-3).
- Simon Leng, While My Guitar Gently Weeps: The Music of George Harrison, Hal Leonard (Milwaukee, WI, 2006; ISBN 1-4234-0609-5).
- Chip Madinger & Mark Easter, Eight Arms to Hold You: The Solo Beatles Compendium, 44.1 Productions (Chesterfield, MO, 2000; ISBN 0-615-11724-4).
- Jörg Pieper, The Solo Beatles Film & TV Chronicle 1971–1980, Premium Förlag (Stockholm, 2012; ISBN 978-1-4092-8301-0).
- Robert Rodriguez, Fab Four FAQ 2.0: The Beatles' Solo Years, 1970–1980, Backbeat Books (Milwaukee, WI, 2010; ISBN 978-1-4165-9093-4).
- Ravi Shankar, Raga Mala: The Autobiography of Ravi Shankar, Welcome Rain (New York, NY, 1999; ISBN 1-56649-104-5).
- Oliver Trager, The American Book of the Dead: The Definitive Grateful Dead Encyclopedia, Fireside (New York, NY, 1997; ISBN 978-0-684-81402-5).
- World Music: The Rough Guide (Volume 2: Latin and North America, Caribbean, India, Asia and Pacific), Rough Guides/Penguin (London, 2000; ISBN 1-85828-636-0).
