= George Harrison and Ravi Shankar's 1974 North American tour =

1974 concert tour by George Harrison and Ravi Shankar

- Tour by George Harrison and Ravi Shankar
- Tour programme
- Location: United States, Canada
- Associated albums: Dark Horse; Shankar Family & Friends
- Start date: 2 November 1974
- End date: 20 December 1974
- Legs: 1
- No. of shows: 45
George Harrison tour chronology
George Harrison and Ravi Shankar's 1974 North American tour	George Harrison–Eric Clapton 1991 Japanese Tour
Ravi Shankar tour chronology
Music Festival from India (1974)	George Harrison and Ravi Shankar's 1974 North American tour

George Harrison and Ravi Shankar's 1974 North American tour was a 45-show concert tour of the United States and Canada, undertaken by English musician George Harrison and Indian sitarist Ravi Shankar in November and December 1974. It is often referred to as the Dark Horse Tour, since the concerts served as a launch for Harrison's record label Dark Horse Records, to which Shankar was one of the inaugural signings, and Harrison's concurrent single was the song "Dark Horse". The release of his delayed album, also titled Dark Horse, followed towards the end of the tour. The shows featured guest spots by Harrison's band members Billy Preston and Tom Scott.

== History ==
The 1974 tour was the first in North America by a former member of the Beatles since the band's 1966 visit. Raising expectations further among fans and the media, it marked the first live performances by Harrison since his successful staging of the 1971 Concert for Bangladesh shows, which had also featured Shankar and Preston. Harrison had no wish to revisit his Beatles past, however. He also stated in his pre-tour press conference in Los Angeles, in October 1974: "it's definitely not going to be a Bangladesh Mark II, if that's what people are thinking."

At the same press conference, in reply to questions about a rumoured Beatles reunion, he said that his former band "[weren't] that good", relative to musicians he had worked with since, and he dismissed the idea of ever being in a group with Paul McCartney again. According to author Peter Doggett, these remarks created "the same sense of shock" as John Lennon's 1970 lyric "I don't believe in Beatles" (from the song "God"). Harrison biographer Simon Leng writes that the ensuing tour represented "a whirlwind of pent-up Beatlemania" in North America, "where the group had a status way beyond that of mere icons".

In his set list for the tour, Harrison included just four Beatles songs: his own compositions "Something", "While My Guitar Gently Weeps" and "For You Blue", and the Lennon–McCartney song "In My Life". Aside from Scott and Preston, the musicians in Harrison's band included the soul/R&B rhythm section of Willie Weeks and Andy Newmark, Scott's L.A. Express bandmate Robben Ford (on guitar), jazz percussionist Emil Richards, and horn players Jim Horn and Chuck Findley.

Among Shankar's orchestra of top Indian classical musicians were Alla Rakha, Shivkumar Sharma, Lakshmi Shankar, Hariprasad Chaurasia, L. Subramaniam and Sultan Khan. All of Shankar's musicians had recently participated in his Music Festival from India tour of Europe, which Harrison presented under the auspices of his Material World Charitable Foundation. Harrison also recorded a studio album by Shankar's orchestra and helped promote his other Dark Horse Records act, Splinter. These commitments left him behind schedule with his own album, Dark Horse, which he was forced to complete in Los Angeles in October, when not rehearsing for the tour. During the concerts in North America, the two ensembles performed separately and as one, mirroring the East–West fusion of Shankar's first Dark Horse album, Shankar Family & Friends.

== Reception ==
The response from music critics varied significantly throughout the tour. Some reviewers were scathing in their assessment: Harrison was criticised for failing to respect the public's nostalgia for the Beatles, his choosing to afford considerable stage-time to Shankar's ensemble, his spiritual pronouncements and on-stage demeanour, and particularly the rough quality of his singing voice, caused by overexertion in the months leading up to the opening concert. Other reviews were highly favourable, admiring Harrison's humility in sharing the spotlight with his fellow musicians and the lack of overly theatrical presentation, and praising the breadth and adventurousness of the musical programme.

Mikal Gilmore of Rolling Stone magazine wrote in 2002 that the tour was "almost universally savaged by the press". Leng, having researched the contemporary coverage for his book While My Guitar Gently Weeps, concludes that "the majority of reviews were positive, in some cases ecstatic …" Leng contends that "the 'given' view of the tour" – namely, that it was "the most calamitous road show in the history of the genre" – has come from a series of unfavourable articles in Rolling Stone, culminating in the magazine's review of Dark Horse. Author Robert Rodriguez summarises the critical reception as follows: "Smaller press outlets without axes to grind tended to review the shows the best, whereas rock establishment coverage, such as Rolling Stone's, tended to spin the tour as something close to an unmitigated disaster (something that George never forgave them for)."

Aside from critics' opinions of the musical content, Harrison took exception to their reports that the shows were not being well received by audiences. Some 750,000 people attended the concerts, which grossed a total of around $4 million. In his 1997 autobiography, Raga Mala, Shankar says that despite the mixed critical reception, "financially it was not a failure", and all the musicians "immensely enjoyed the performing and especially the touring together". A double live album and a documentary film of the tour were planned but neither release took place.

In his 2014 article on the tour, for the website Ultimate Classic Rock, Nick DeRiso writes: "Ultimately, Harrison came to see the tour's issues as more a matter of media perception than anything. Bootlegs, to some degree, back up that notion – as fans appear to receive the dates with no small amount of enthusiasm." Writing for Record Collector in 2001, Peter Doggett said that the available bootlegs reveal the full extent of Harrison's damaged vocal cords, but equally, "tapes of the better nights of the tour prove that the enterprise deserved a better fate." DeRiso quotes Harrison's later recollection that "The public as a whole enjoyed it; it was always standing ovations – even for the Indian section … But they got on my case, the press – some of them anyway."

== Legacy ==
Due to the scrutiny he received from the media, Harrison remained wary of giving live performances. After 1974, he did not tour again until 1991, when he played a series of concerts in Japan with Eric Clapton.

More recently, the 1974 Harrison–Shankar tour has been recognised by some commentators as a forerunner to the 1980s world music genre, popularised by Western artists such as Paul Simon, Peter Gabriel and David Byrne. Referring to critics of the tour in a 1977 BBC Radio interview, Harrison said: "It's a pity that a lot of people missed out on something that went above their heads." Nick Hasted of Uncut views the reworking of the Beatles' "Something" as "unforgivable" but deems the programme "in retrospect, an admirable show" and a precursor to Bob Dylan's Rolling Thunder Revue.

== Tour dates ==
The tour itinerary was as follows:

Date	City	Country	Venue
2 November 1974	Vancouver, British Columbia	Canada	Pacific Coliseum
4 November 1974	Seattle, Washington	United States	Seattle Center Coliseum
6 November 1974	Daly City, California	United States	Cow Palace
7 November 1974	Daly City, California	United States	Cow Palace
8 November 1974 (2 shows)	Oakland, California	United States	Oakland–Alameda County Coliseum Arena
10 November 1974	Long Beach, California	United States	Long Beach Arena
11 November 1974	Inglewood, California	United States	The Forum
12 November 1974 (2 shows)	Inglewood, California	United States	The Forum
14 November 1974 (2 shows)	Tucson, Arizona	United States	Tucson Community Center
16 November 1974	Salt Lake City, Utah	United States	Salt Palace
18 November 1974 (2 shows)	Denver, Colorado	United States	Denver Coliseum
20 November 1974	St. Louis, Missouri	United States	St. Louis Arena
21 November 1974	Tulsa, Oklahoma	United States	Tulsa Assembly Center
22 November 1974	Fort Worth, Texas	United States	Tarrant County Convention Center
24 November 1974 (2 shows)	Houston, Texas	United States	Hofheinz Pavilion
26 November 1974	Baton Rouge, Louisiana	United States	LSU Assembly Center
27 November 1974	Memphis, Tennessee	United States	Mid-South Coliseum
28 November 1974 (2 shows)	Atlanta, Georgia	United States	Omni Coliseum
30 November 1974 (2 shows)	Chicago, Illinois	United States	Chicago Stadium
4 December 1974 (2 shows)	Detroit, Michigan	United States	Olympia Stadium
6 December 1974 (2 shows)	Toronto, Ontario	Canada	Maple Leaf Gardens
8 December 1974 (2 shows)	Montreal, Quebec	Canada	Montreal Forum
10 December 1974 (2 shows)	Boston, Massachusetts	United States	Boston Garden
11 December 1974	Providence, Rhode Island	United States	Providence Civic Center
13 December 1974 (2 shows)	Landover, Maryland	United States	Capital Centre
15 December 1974 (2 shows)	Uniondale, New York	United States	Nassau Coliseum
16 December 1974	Philadelphia, Pennsylvania	United States	Spectrum
17 December 1974 (2 shows)	Philadelphia, Pennsylvania	United States	Spectrum
19 December 1974	New York City	United States	Madison Square Garden
20 December 1974 (2 shows)	New York City	United States	Madison Square Garden

== Setlist ==
The setlist for the shows was taken from the following songs (the name of each selection's main performer appears in parentheses):

- "Hari's on Tour (Express)" (George Harrison)
- "The Lord Loves the One (That Loves the Lord)" (Harrison) (cut from setlist after opening night)
- "Who Can See It" (Harrison) (cut from setlist after opening night)
- "Something" (Harrison)
- "While My Guitar Gently Weeps" (Harrison)
- "Will It Go Round in Circles" (Billy Preston)
- "Sue Me, Sue You Blues" (Harrison)
- "Zoom, Zoom, Zoom" (Ravi Shankar)
- "Naderdani" (Shankar)
- "Cheparte" (Shankar)
- "For You Blue" (Harrison)
- "Give Me Love (Give Me Peace on Earth)" (Harrison)

- "Sound Stage of Mind" (ensemble jam)
- "In My Life" (Harrison)
- "Tom Cat" (Tom Scott)
- "Māya Love" (Harrison)
- "Outa-Space" (Preston)
- "Dark Horse" (Harrison)
- "Nothing from Nothing" (Preston)
- "What Is Life" (Harrison)
- "Anurag" (Shankar)
- "I Am Missing You" (Shankar)
- "Dispute & Violence" (Shankar)
- "My Sweet Lord" (Harrison)

== Tour personnel ==
Harrison's band:

- George Harrison – vocals, electric and acoustic guitars, backing vocals
- Billy Preston – vocals, organ, clavinet, synthesizer, backing vocals
- Tom Scott – saxophones, flute
- Robben Ford – electric and acoustic guitars, backing vocals
- Jim Horn – saxophones, flute
- Chuck Findley – trumpet, flute
- Emil Richards – marimba, percussion
- Willie Weeks – bass
- Andy Newmark – drums
- Jim Keltner – drums (from 27 November)
- Kumar Shankar – percussion, backing vocals
- Leon Russell - clavinet (from 21 November)

Shankar's orchestra:

- Ravi Shankar – sitar, conductor
- Lakshmi Shankar – vocals, swarmandal; conductor (in Ravi Shankar's absence)
- Alla Rakha – tabla
- T.V. Gopalkrishnan – vocals, mridangam, khanjira
- Hariprasad Chaurasia – bansuri
- Shivkumar Sharma – santoor, backing vocals
- Kartick Kumar – sitar
- Sultan Khan – sarangi
- Gopal Krishan – vichitra veena, backing vocals
- L. Subramaniam – South Indian violin
- Satyadev Pawar – North Indian violin
- Rijram Desad – pakavaj, dholki, nagada, huduk, duff
- Kamalesh Maitra – tabla tarang, duggi tarang, madal tarang
- Harihar Rao – kartal, manjira, dholak, gubgubbi, backing vocals
- Viji Shankar – tambura, backing vocals

== Sources ==
- Keith Badman, The Beatles Diary Volume 2: After the Break-Up 1970–2001, Omnibus Press (London, 2001; ISBN 0-7119-8307-0).
- Alan Clayson, George Harrison, Sanctuary (London, 2003; ISBN 1-86074-489-3).
- Peter Doggett, You Never Give Me Your Money: The Beatles After the Breakup, It Books (New York, NY, 2011; ISBN 978-0-06-177418-8).
- The Editors of Rolling Stone, Harrison, Rolling Stone Press/Simon & Schuster (New York, NY, 2002; ISBN 0-7432-3581-9).
- Joshua M. Greene, Here Comes the Sun: The Spiritual and Musical Journey of George Harrison, John Wiley & Sons (Hoboken, NJ, 2006; ISBN 978-0-470-12780-3).
- Olivia Harrison, George Harrison: Living in the Material World, Abrams (New York, NY, 2011; ISBN 978-1-4197-0220-4).
- Bill Harry, The George Harrison Encyclopedia, Virgin Books (London, 2003; ISBN 978-0-7535-0822-0).
- Andrew Grant Jackson, Still the Greatest: The Essential Solo Beatles Songs, Scarecrow Press (Lanham, MD, 2012; ISBN 978-0-8108-8222-5).
- Peter Lavezzoli, The Dawn of Indian Music in the West, Continuum (New York, NY, 2006; ISBN 0-8264-2819-3).
- Simon Leng, While My Guitar Gently Weeps: The Music of George Harrison, Hal Leonard (Milwaukee, WI, 2006; ISBN 1-4234-0609-5).
- Chip Madinger & Mark Easter, Eight Arms to Hold You: The Solo Beatles Compendium, 44.1 Productions (Chesterfield, MO, 2000; ISBN 0-615-11724-4).
- The New Rolling Stone Encyclopedia of Rock & Roll, Fireside/Rolling Stone Press (New York, NY, 1995; ISBN 0-684-81044-1).
- Robert Rodriguez, Fab Four FAQ 2.0: The Beatles' Solo Years, 1970–1980, Backbeat Books (Milwaukee, WI, 2010; ISBN 978-1-4165-9093-4).
- Nicholas Schaffner, The Beatles Forever, McGraw-Hill (New York, NY, 1978; ISBN 0-07-055087-5).
- Ravi Shankar, Raga Mala: The Autobiography of Ravi Shankar, Welcome Rain (New York, NY, 1999; ISBN 1-56649-104-5).
- Bruce Spizer, The Beatles Solo on Apple Records, 498 Productions (New Orleans, LA, 2005; ISBN 0-9662649-5-9).
- Gary Tillery, Working Class Mystic: A Spiritual Biography of George Harrison, Quest Books (Wheaton, IL, 2011; ISBN 978-0-8356-0900-5).
- Bob Woffinden, The Beatles Apart, Proteus (London, 1981; ISBN 0-906071-89-5).
