= It Is 'He' (Jai Sri Krishna) =

Song by George Harrison

from the album Dark Horse
- Released: 9 December 1974
- Genre: Folk rock, gospel
- Length: 4:50
- Label: Apple
- Songwriter: George Harrison
- Producer: George Harrison

"It Is 'He' (Jai Sri Krishna)" is a song by English musician George Harrison, released as the final track of his 1974 album Dark Horse. Harrison was inspired to write the song while in the Hindu holy city of Vrindavan, in northern India, with his friend Ravi Shankar. The composition originated on a day that Harrison describes in his autobiography as "my most fantastic experience", during which his party and their ascetic guide toured the city's temples. The song's choruses were adapted from the Sanskrit chant they sang before visiting Seva Kunj, a park dedicated to Krishna's childhood. The same pilgrimage to India led to Harrison staging Shankar's Music Festival from India in September 1974 and undertaking a joint North American tour with Shankar at the end of that year.

Despite the devotional nature of the song, Harrison wrote it part-way through a period of divergence from the spiritual goals he had espoused in his previous works, particularly Living in the Material World (1973). "It Is 'He'" serves as a rare example of an overtly religious song on Dark Horse. Recorded between August and October 1974, the track features an unusual mix of musical styles and instrumentation – including gospel-style keyboards, folk-rock acoustic guitar, Indian string and percussion instruments, and Moog synthesizer. Besides Harrison, the musicians on the recording include Billy Preston, Tom Scott and Emil Richards, all of whom played in his 1974 tour band and contributed to Shankar's concurrent release, Shankar Family & Friends.

"It Is 'He' (Jai Sri Krishna)" continued Harrison's fusion of the Hindu bhajan tradition with Western pop and rock. The song failed to gain the favourable reception afforded his earlier productions in that style, however, such as "My Sweet Lord", "Hare Krishna Mantra" and "Give Me Love". With his spiritual pronouncements during the tour proving similarly unwelcome to many music critics, Harrison subsequently withdrew from making such public statements of Hindu religiosity until producing Shankar's Chants of India album in 1996. "It Is 'He'" was the last overtly devotional song released under Harrison's name until the posthumously issued "Brainwashed" in 2002.

== Background and inspiration ==
I was a stiff Westerner when we started off, but there was a moment when the atmosphere of [Vrindavan] got to me, melting all the bullshit away ... it became a fantastic, blissful experience for me.

— George Harrison, 1979

In a 1994 interview held at Ravi Shankar's home in California, George Harrison referred to the reluctance he used to feel before visiting Shankar in India or meeting with A.C. Bhaktivedanta Swami Prabhupada, founder of the Hare Krishna movement, or more formally the International Society for Krishna Consciousness (ISKCON). This was due to the "craziness" taking place in his life, Harrison continued, which sat at odds with the spiritual goals represented by these friends. In January and February 1974, he visited India part-way through a period that he describes in his autobiography, I, Me, Mine (1980), as "the naughty years", coinciding with the end of his marriage to Pattie Boyd. The visit led to Harrison writing two songs that would appear on his Dark Horse album later that year: "It Is 'He' (Jai Sri Krishna)" and "Simply Shady". While the latter track reflected the singer's recent indulgences with drugs and alcohol, "It Is 'He'" documented what author Simon Leng terms "a spiritual epiphany for Harrison" in the Hindu holy city of Vrindavan.

Harrison went to India in 1974 to attend a ceremony in honour of Shankar's new home, in Benares, on the banks of the River Ganges. At this time, the two musicians came up with the idea for Ravi Shankar's Music Festival from India – a revue of Indian folk music presented by an orchestra of eighteen pioneers of the genre (Note: Lakshmi Shankar, Hariprasad Chaurasia, L. Subramaniam, T.V. Gopalkrishnan, Shivkumar Sharma, Alla Rakha and Sultan Khan were among the musicians selected by Shankar for his Music Festival orchestra.) – and a subsequent joint tour of North America. From Benares, Harrison and Shankar then travelled across the state of Uttar Pradesh to Vrindavan, where the Hindu deity Krishna is said to have spent his childhood, thousands of years before. Discussing "It Is 'He' (Jai Sri Krishna)" in I, Me, Mine, Harrison recalls that they arrived there at dusk, and adds: "the whole town is Krishna conscious – everyone, everywhere was chanting 'Hare Krishna' and various permutations on that."

=== Touring Vrindavan's temples ===
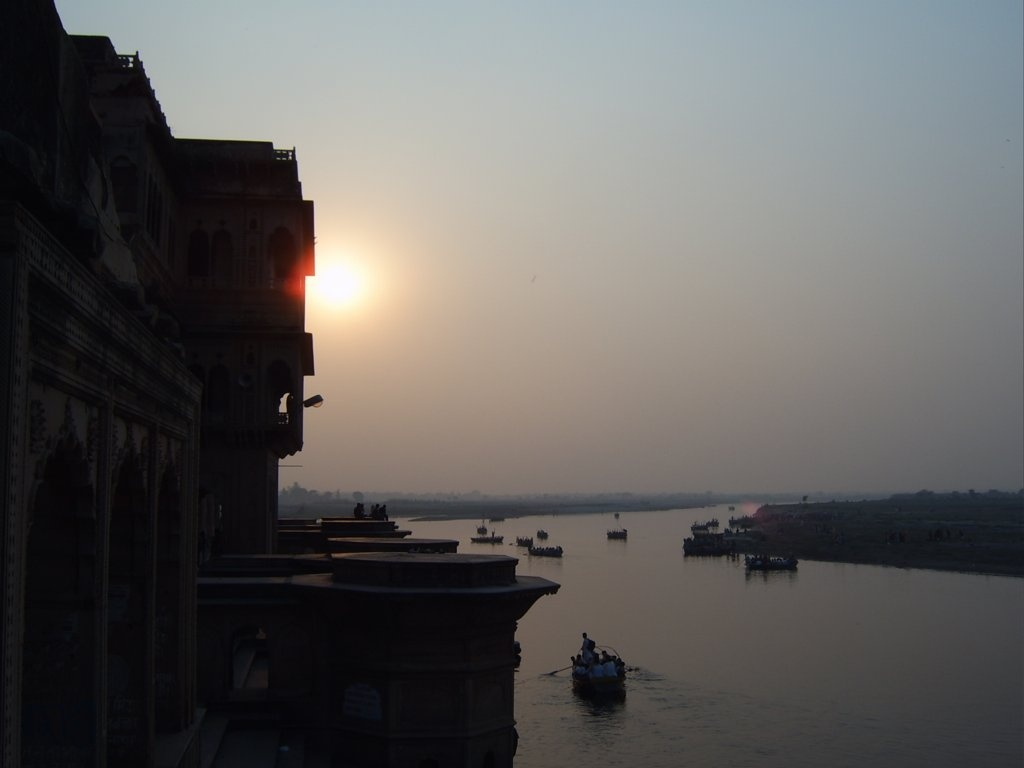
The Yamuna River at Vrindavan, at sunset – Harrison and Shankar stayed at a riverside ashram during their visit to the town.

Shankar had arranged for an English-speaking ascetic named Sripad Maharaj to serve as their guide on a tour of the local temples. Despite the bedraggled appearance of Maharaj, Harrison noticed that throughout the tour, swamis and other passers-by would greet the guide by kissing his feet – a sign of the utmost reverence.

The party slept for a few hours in rooms provided by one of the temples, during which Harrison heard "huge heavenly choirs" in his dreams and experienced "the deepest sleep I had ever had in my life". After they had attended morning puja at this temple, at 4 am, Maharaj began singing a bhajan, a Hindu musical prayer. In the tradition of communal chanting, or kirtana, Harrison and the others there sang in response, repeating Maharaj's lines, for a period lasting up to five hours.

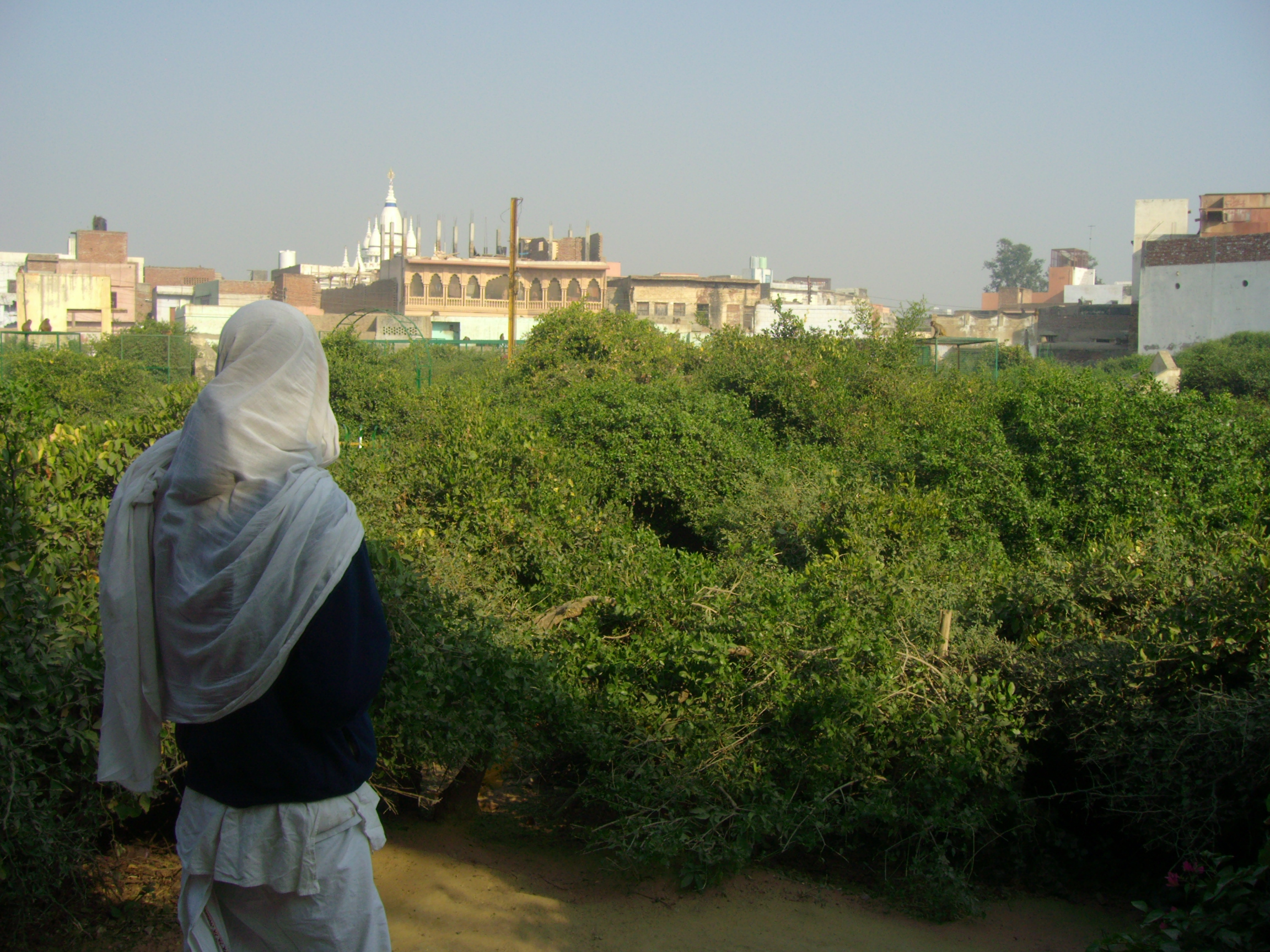
Seva Kunj gardens in Vrindavan, one of the locations that inspired Harrison to write the song

Late that morning, Harrison and Shankar accompanied Maharaj to Seva Kunj, a park that commemorates Krishna's love for all-night dancing with his gopis (cow-herd girls). Harrison later marvelled of Seva Kunj: "All the trees, which are so ancient, bow down and the branches touch the ground. Just to walk in that place is incredible." In I, Me, Mine, he describes the Vrinadavan tour as "my most fantastic experience" and says that, at Maharaj's suggestion, he turned the bhajan into a song, titled "It Is 'He' (Jai Sri Krishna)".

=== Other activities in Vrindavan ===
Harrison and Shankar spent a few days in the city, at the Sri Chaitanya Prema Samastbana ashram, on the banks of the Yamuna River; there, they meditated, wrote music and discussed "the art of devotion". Harrison also met with Prabhupada at this time and reunited with ISKCON disciples Gurudas and Yamuna. The latter couple were among the founding devotees of the London Radha Krishna Temple, whose recordings of chants, including a hit version of the Hare Krishna mantra, Harrison had produced for Apple Records in 1969–70. Theologian Dale Allison writes that "It Is 'He'" resulted from Harrison having "rediscovered his enthusiasm for chanting" while in India.

== Composition ==
Leng describes the mood of the song as "upbeat pseudo-calypso". He views it as a further example of the musical approach that Harrison employed in songs such as "My Sweet Lord" and "Give Me Love (Give Me Peace on Earth)", whereby the Hindu bhajan tradition is fused with Western gospel music. The inclusion of Sanskrit in "It Is 'He' (Jai Sri Krishna)" recalls both "My Sweet Lord", which incorporates part of the Hare Krishna mantra as well as other Hindu prayers, and "Gopala Krishna", an unreleased track that Harrison also recorded for his All Things Must Pass triple album in 1970.

Over a three-chord pattern in the key of G major, Harrison adapted the words sung at the Vrinadavan kirtana, in a repetitive form typical of a mantra:

Jai Krishna, jai Krishna Krishna
Jai Krishna, jai Sri Krishna
Jai radhé, jai radhé radhé
Jai radhé, jai sri radhé.

Aside from offering praise to Krishna, these lines address Radha, his consort and lover, whom ISKCON devotees recognise as the female form of God. The words serve as the song's chorus and translate to mean, "All glories and praise to Lord Krishna; all glories and praise to Goddess Radha."

Similar to Harrison's 1973 song "Living in the Material World" – where he contrasts the Western or "material" parts of the composition with its meditative, "spiritual sky" sections – "It Is 'He' (Jai Sri Krishna)" employs a change in tempo and rhythm, to differentiate between the Sanskrit choruses and the English-language verses. Lyrically, the latter sections outline the "It Is 'He'" element of the song title. In the first of the three verses, Harrison sings of his deity as "He whose eyes have seen / What our lives have been / And who we really are"; in the final verse, the description is: "He who is complete / Three worlds at His feet / Cause of every star ...

== Recording ==
Throughout 1974, progress on Dark Horse was compromised by Harrison's commitment to setting up a new record label, also called Dark Horse, and his dedication to projects by the label's first signings, Shankar and the English duo Splinter. With expectations high for his North American tour, the first by a former member of the Beatles, Harrison later referred to the pressure he had imposed on himself that year as "ridiculous". As a further distraction, his return to less ascetic ways post-Vrinadavan was marked by what he termed "a bit of a bender to make up for all the years I'd been married", as Boyd left him in July. (Note: Recalling a visit he made to the couple's home shortly before Boyd's departure, Pete Townshend has written of the paradox between Harrison's dismissal of all material things as maya (or illusionary), including his use of cocaine, and his dedication to a spiritual path. Townshend adds: "I fell in love with George that night … his spiritual commitment was absolute: yellow-robed Hare Krishna followers living in the house wandered in and out as we chatted.")

Harrison taped an early version of "It Is 'He'" at his Friar Park studio, FPSHOT, in Oxfordshire, with Bobby Purvis and Bill Elliott of Splinter on backing vocals. On the officially released recording, he was backed by members of his 1974 tour band, including Tom Scott (flute), Billy Preston (piano, organ), Willie Weeks (bass) and Andy Newmark (drums). These four American musicians attended the main sessions for Dark Horse, which took place at FPSHOT over August–September, in between rehearsals there for the Music Festival of India's tour of Europe and the recording of a studio album by Shankar's ensemble, which Harrison also produced. (Note: In the liner notes to the 2014 reissue of Dark Horse, Harrison's widow Olivia says that he worked at night on his own album and would wake up to the sound of the Music Festival orchestra rehearsing in the house.) Harrison's own contributions to the track included 12-string acoustic guitar and Moog synthesizer.

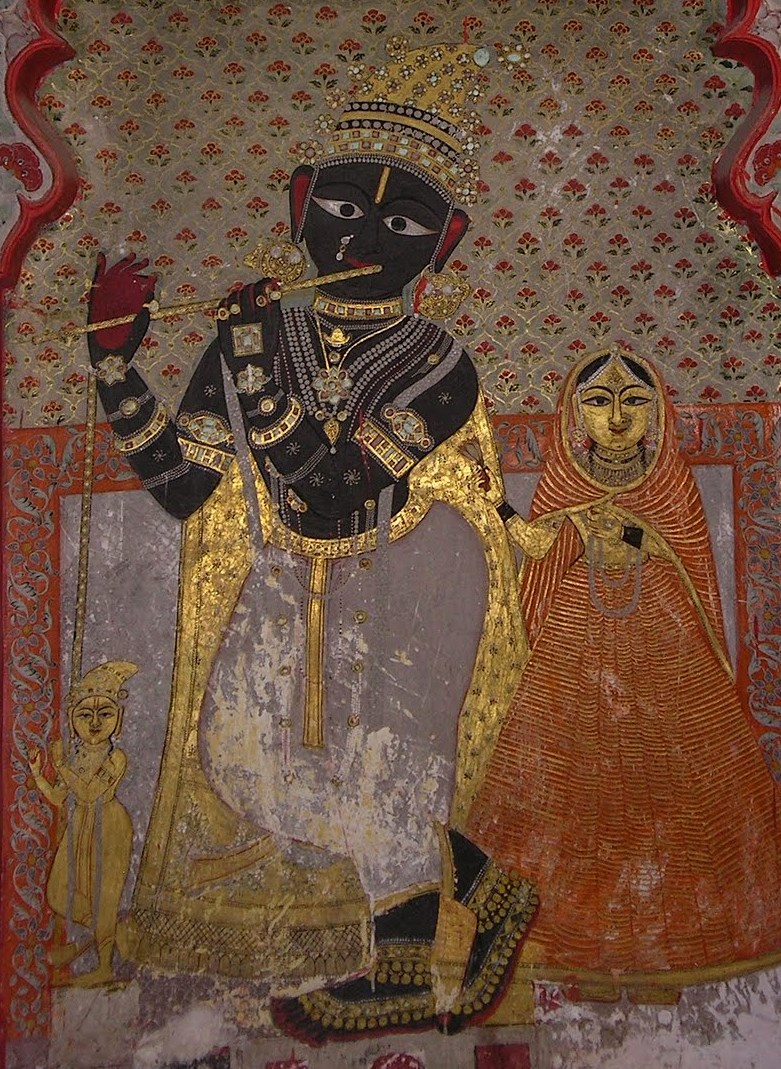
A fourteenth-century fresco showing Krishna playing his flute

In October, with his album still unfinished, Harrison flew to Los Angeles, California, where he rehearsed with his musicians and Shankar's orchestra for the upcoming tour, while carrying out further recording at A&M Studios. As additional members of the tour band, Jim Horn and Chuck Findley played flutes on "It Is 'He'" and Emil Richards overdubbed percussion.

The completed recording features a mix of musical styles, with the R&B-funk rhythm section of Weeks and Newmark, gospel keyboards from Preston, and Richards' wobbleboard recalling pre-rock 'n' roll skiffle. (Note: Along with Scott and Preston, Richards, a jazz percussionist, had similarly contributed to the East–West musical fusion of Shankar's Harrison-produced Shankar Family & Friends album.) Aside from the Western instrumentation he supplied on "It Is 'He'", Harrison provided Indian music textures through his use of the gut-stringed gubgubbi – described by Leng as a "banjo-meets-vocal sound" – as well as small hand-cymbals (or kartal), commonly played by Hare Krishna devotees during kirtana. In addition, according to Leng, the flute parts serve as a musical reference to Krishna, who is often shown playing a flute in scenes depicting his Lila (pastimes) in Vrindavan.

Already suffering from laryngitis, Harrison overtaxed his voice during the weeks of combined recording and rehearsals in Los Angeles, and his hoarse singing would doom his subsequent concerts in the eyes of many observers. Alone among the tracks on Dark Horse, however, "It Is 'He'" contains a lead vocal that is relatively clean and free of the effects of laryngitis. (Note: Given the cleanness of Harrison's singing on "It Is 'He'", author Robert Rodriguez suggests that he may have recorded part of the track before the sessions in August and September. The 2014 Dark Horse CD booklet reproduces Harrison's notes for some rough mixes of a recording of "It Is 'He'", which are dated 11 June 1974.)

== Release ==
Every show was probably hard for him. He was trying sincerely to do something to benefit people. You see, in Indian tradition you cannot separate music from spirituality ... Anyone else under that kind of pressure would have said, "Okay, I'm calling it off ..." I always had the feeling someone very special was occupying that body.

— Indian classical musician L. Subramaniam, on Harrison's commitment throughout the 1974 tour

Dark Horse was issued on 9 December 1974, towards the end of Harrison and Shankar's North American tour, with a UK release following on 20 December. The concerts had attracted scorn from many music critics, partly because of Harrison's decision to feature Indian music so heavily in the program and his frequent statements regarding his Hindu faith. "It Is 'He' (Jai Sri Krishna)" appeared as the final track on Dark Horse, sequenced after "Far East Man", a song that Harrison biographers interpret variously as a tribute to Shankar and India, and a reaffirmation of the humanitarian goals represented by Harrison and Shankar's Bangladesh aid project.

In contrast with Living in the Material World in 1973, "It Is 'He'" was the sole example of a devotional song on the album. Leng considers that Dark Horse coincided with "a crisis of faith" on Harrison's part and that, amid confessionals dealing with the singer's troubled personal life and rock-star excess, the track was "almost a reminder to himself of golden days in India, when he felt comforted by belief". (Note: At the pre-tour press conference on 23 October, Harrison distributed a written Q&A using questions first put to him in 1963 by the New Musical Express. In reply to what his "most thrilling experience" was in 1974, Harrison wrote "Seeking Krishna in [Vrindavan]", where previously the answer had been the immediate success of one of the Beatles' first singles.)

While he identifies a level of religiosity in other songs on Dark Horse, Allison pairs the album with Material World as works that "literally wear their Hinduism on their record sleeves". The front cover of Dark Horse includes a Himalayan landscape, at the top of which the Indian yogi Mahavatar Babaji floats in the sky, representing Krishna. The phrase "All glories to Sri Krsna" appears on the back cover. Among his handwritten notes on the LP's inner sleeve, Harrison included Sripad Maharaj's name in a list headed "Thanks to". The song was published by Oops Publishing (or Ganga in the United States), the new company that Harrison founded in March 1974.

== Critical reception ==
Like the North American tour, Dark Horse was much maligned on release. According to Simon Leng, Harrison's rejection of rock 'n' roll tradition and the Beatles' legacy during the tour was the cause for the album's unfavourable critical reception; in the case of "It Is 'He'", Leng continues, this manifested as "outright hostility" from some reviewers. Bob Woffinden of the NME wrote: "You keep looking for saving graces [on the album], for words of enthusiasm to pass on ... Tracks like 'It Is HE (Jai Sri Krishna)' are more typical. There, the endless repetition of 'Jai Sri Krishna, Jai Sri Radhe' over an enfeebled tune is hardly compelling listening." Writing for Rolling Stone, Jim Miller opined: "[Harrison's] religiosity, once a spacey bauble in the Beatles' panoply, has come to resemble the obsessiveness of a zealot." In a more favourable review, Brian Harrigan of Melody Maker called the song "a bit of a groover" and credited Harrison with the creation of "a new category in music – Country and Eastern".

The song has invited varied opinions among Harrison and Beatles biographers. Ian Inglis describes the deceleration into half-time during the verses as "awkward" and notes the failure of "It Is 'He'" next to Harrison's earlier successes with "My Sweet Lord" and "Hare Krishna Mantra". Inglis concludes: "The gently floating Indian [choruses] are somewhat undermined by the ponderous nature of the rock-oriented interludes, and the evangelical nature of the English words – 'he who is complete' – finally discourage any attempt at participation." Writing in The Rough Guide to the Beatles, Chris Ingham views the track as "George at his happy-clappy nadir" and pairs it with "Ding Dong, Ding Dong", which Harrison released as a hoped-for Christmas–New Year hit in the UK, as "two of the worst songs he ever allowed out".

While also commenting on the underachieving "Ding Dong" single, Alan Clayson writes: "Despite its non-Christian slant, George might have fared better with the wonderful 'It Is "He" (Jai Sri Krishna)'... [The] repeated chorus was so uplifting that it scarcely mattered that it was sung (without laryngitis) entirely in Hindi – no more, anyway, than McCartney breaking into French on 'Michelle' off Rubber Soul." Robert Rodriguez rates "It Is 'He'" among Harrison's most overlooked tracks from the 1970s and describes it as "a joyful delight" and "unrelentingly calming yet catchy". Leng notes the song as a continuation of Harrison's successful bhajan–gospel "formula", now rendered as "Krishna skiffle" and set in a "Kashmiri party atmosphere". Leng views "It Is 'He'" as "charming" and credits Harrison with anticipating the late 1980s world music genre, through his ethnomusicologist's adoption of the Bengali gubgubbi, or khomok.

In a review of the 2014 reissue of Dark Horse, for Paste magazine, Robert Ham cited the song as a highlight of the album, writing: "The giddy 'Is It "He" (Jai Sri Krishna)' ... is a joyous affirmation of [Harrison's] spiritual beliefs that mashes up many of his musical interests, with Indian instruments finding consort with rambling English folk and R&B horn stabs." Blogcritics' Chaz Lipp identified "a lot of rewarding listening [on Dark Horse] for those willing to listen with an open mind", among which, he continues: "'Far East Man' is a smooth soul collaboration with Ron Wood that, once heard, lodges itself in the brain. Even catchier is the closing track, 'It Is "He" (Jai Sri Krishna).'"

== Aftermath and legacy ==
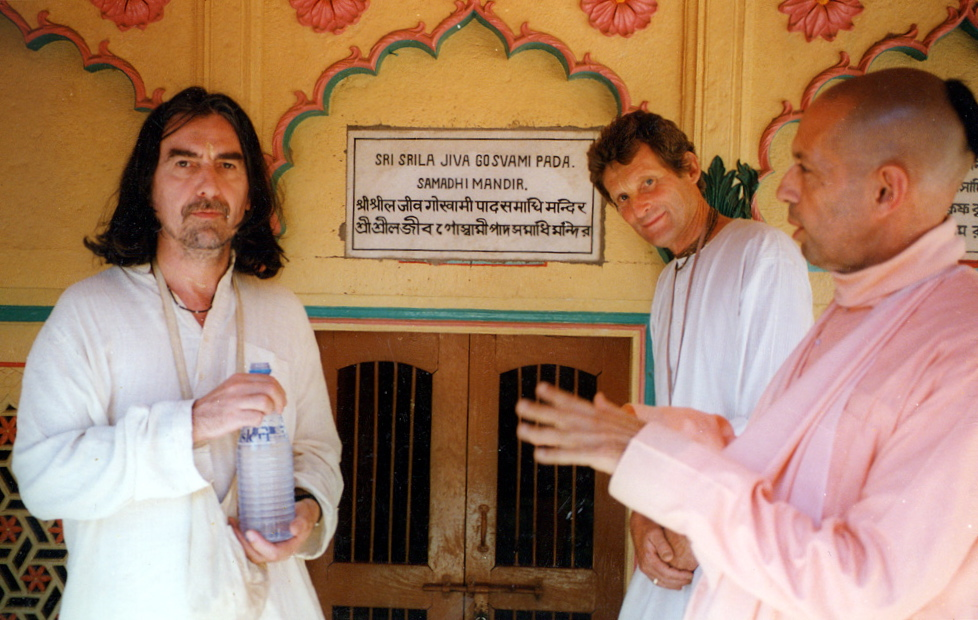
Harrison (left), with his Hare Krishna friends Shyamasundar Das and Mukunda Goswami, in Vrindavan in 1996

First published in August 1980, I, Me, Mine contains two pages of description from Harrison on Vrindavan and the story behind "It Is 'He' (Jai Sri Krishna)". This coverage contrasts with little discussion of his years as a member of the Beatles, and typically brief commentary on each of his songs. In the book, Harrison dedicates "It Is 'He'" to Sripad Maharaj, whom he describes as "a wonderful, humble, Holy man".

After 1974, Harrison no longer wrote songs as obviously Krishna-devotional as "It Is 'He' (Jai Sri Krishna)", although he returned to recording bhajans intermittently, with songs such as "Dear One" in 1976 and "Life Itself", released in 1981. In his book The Dawn of Indian Music in the West, Peter Lavezzoli writes that following Dark Horse and the "ill-fated 1974 tour", Harrison "continued to infuse his work with an implicit spirituality that rarely manifested on the surface". Speaking to ISKCON devotee Mukunda Goswami in 1982, Harrison said:

Back in the sixties, whatever we were all getting into, we tended to broadcast it as loud as we could. I had had certain realizations and went through a period where I was so thrilled about my discoveries and realizations that I wanted to shout and tell it to everybody. But there's a time to shout it out and a time not to shout it out.

Having distanced himself from the Hare Krishna movement after Prabhupada's death in 1977 and through the 1980s, Harrison returned to Vrindavan with Mukunda and other devotees in 1996, while in India working on Shankar's album Chants of India. Leng views the latter project as Harrison returning to the musical statements of his Radha Krishna Temple recordings and "It Is 'He' (Jai Sri Krishna)". During the Friar Park sessions for Chants of India, Harrison taped the Indian music portions of his song "Brainwashed", which ends with the Sanskrit prayer "Namah Parvati". Dale Allison comments that it was not until the release of this chanted mantra, issued posthumously in 2002, that Harrison again made such an "explicit statement" of Hindu religiosity as he had on "It Is 'He'".

== Personnel ==
According to Bruce Spizer:

- George Harrison – lead vocals, acoustic guitars, gubgubbi, Moog synthesizer, percussion, backing vocals
- Billy Preston – piano, organ
- Willie Weeks – bass guitar
- Andy Newmark – drums
- Jim Horn – flute
- Chuck Findley – flute
- Tom Scott – flute
- Emil Richards – wobbleboard

== Sources ==
- Dale C. Allison Jr., The Love There That's Sleeping: The Art and Spirituality of George Harrison, Continuum (New York, NY, 2006; ISBN 978-0-8264-1917-0).
- Keith Badman, The Beatles Diary Volume 2: After the Break-Up 1970–2001, Omnibus Press (London, 2001; ISBN 0-7119-8307-0).
- Harry Castleman & Walter J. Podrazik, All Together Now: The First Complete Beatles Discography 1961–1975, Ballantine Books (New York, NY, 1976; ISBN 0-345-25680-8).
- Chant and Be Happy: The Power of Mantra Meditation, Bhaktivedanta Book Trust (Los Angeles, CA, 1997; ISBN 978-0-89213-118-1).
- Alan Clayson, George Harrison, Sanctuary (London, 2003; ISBN 1-86074-489-3).
- Peter Doggett, You Never Give Me Your Money: The Beatles After the Breakup, It Books (New York, NY, 2011; ISBN 978-0-06-177418-8).
- Graham Dwyer & Richard J. Cole (eds), The Hare Krishna Movement: Forty Years of Chant and Change, I.B. Tauris (London, 2007; ISBN 1-84511-407-8).
- The Editors of Rolling Stone, Harrison, Rolling Stone Press/Simon & Schuster (New York, NY, 2002; ISBN 0-7432-3581-9).
- Joshua M. Greene, Here Comes the Sun: The Spiritual and Musical Journey of George Harrison, John Wiley & Sons (Hoboken, NJ, 2006; ISBN 978-0-470-12780-3).
- George Harrison, I, Me, Mine, Chronicle Books (San Francisco, CA, 2002 [1980]; ISBN 0-8118-3793-9).
- Olivia Harrison, George Harrison: Living in the Material World, Abrams (New York, NY, 2011; ISBN 978-1-4197-0220-4).
- Kevin Howlett, liner notes, Dark Horse CD booklet (Apple Records, 2014; produced by George Harrison).
- Elliot J. Huntley, Mystical One: George Harrison – After the Break-up of the Beatles, Guernica Editions (Toronto, ON, 2006; ISBN 1-55071-197-0).
- Chris Ingham, The Rough Guide to the Beatles (2nd edn), Rough Guides/Penguin (London, 2006; ISBN 978-1-84836-525-4).
- Ian Inglis, The Words and Music of George Harrison, |Praeger (Santa Barbara, CA, 2010; ISBN 978-0-313-37532-3).
- Peter Lavezzoli, The Dawn of Indian Music in the West, Continuum (New York, NY, 2006; ISBN 0-8264-2819-3).
- Simon Leng, While My Guitar Gently Weeps: The Music of George Harrison, Hal Leonard (Milwaukee, WI, 2006; ISBN 1-4234-0609-5).
- Chip Madinger & Mark Easter, Eight Arms to Hold You: The Solo Beatles Compendium, 44.1 Productions (Chesterfield, MO, 2000; ISBN 0-615-11724-4).
- Robert Rodriguez, Fab Four FAQ 2.0: The Beatles' Solo Years, 1970–1980, Backbeat Books (Milwaukee, WI, 2010; ISBN 978-1-4165-9093-4).
- Nicholas Schaffner, The Beatles Forever, McGraw-Hill (New York, NY, 1978; ISBN 0-07-055087-5).
- Ravi Shankar, Raga Mala: The Autobiography of Ravi Shankar, Welcome Rain (New York, NY, 1999; ISBN 1-56649-104-5).
- Mat Snow, "George Harrison: Quiet Storm", Mojo, November 2014, pp. 66–73.
- Bruce Spizer, The Beatles Solo on Apple Records, 498 Productions (New Orleans, LA, 2005; ISBN 0-9662649-5-9).
- Gary Tillery, Working Class Mystic: A Spiritual Biography of George Harrison, Quest Books (Wheaton, IL, 2011; ISBN 978-0-8356-0900-5).
- Pete Townshend, Who I Am, HarperCollins (London, 2012; ISBN 978-0-00-746603-0).
- Bob Woffinden, The Beatles Apart, Proteus (London, 1981; ISBN 0-906071-89-5).
