= Kamalesh Maitra =

- Born: 28 April 1928; Tangail, East Bengal, India
- Died: 22 April 2005 (aged 76) Kreischa, Germany
- Genres: Hindustani classical, world music
- Occupations: Musician, composer, teacher
- Instruments: Tabla tarang, sarod
- Labels: His Master's Voice, Teldec, Wergo, Gramophone Company of India, Smithsonian Folkways, Saregama

Kamalesh Maitra (28 April 1928 – 22 April 2005), often referred to by the title Pandit, was an Indian classical musician, composer and teacher. He is recognised as the last master of the tabla tarang – a melodic percussion instrument consisting of numerous individually tuned hand drums, set in a semicircle. Maitra grew up in Calcutta and played the tabla until joining Uday Shankar's ballet company in 1950 and taking up the tabla tarang. He became the company's musical director and toured internationally with the troupe through to the mid-1970s.

Along with Alla Rakha, Shivkumar Sharma, Hariprasad Chaurasia and others, Maitra was among the musicians that Ravi Shankar selected for his Music Festival from India revue in 1974. He then accompanied Shankar on ex-Beatle George Harrison's North American tour that year – a venture that led to him performing with American jazz musicians Emil Richards and Tom Scott. Maitra settled in Berlin in 1977, where he performed and worked as a music teacher. In 1980, he formed the Ragatala Ensemble, an orchestra that fused elements of Indian and European classical music with jazz and other Western genres. Among his recordings, Tabla Tarang – Melody on Drums (1996) has received critical acclaim, one reviewer describing it as a "milestone" in world music. Maitra developed strong cultural ties with Berlin and continued to live and work in Germany until his death in 2005.

== Background and formative years ==
Kamalesh Maitra was born in Tangail in East Bengal (now Bangladesh) in 1928. His father was an Ayurvedic doctor, and the family lacked the musical lineage commonly associated with Hindustani classical music.

Maitra spent his formative years in Calcutta, absorbing much of the European influence on the city. At the age of twelve, he began playing a variety of hand drums, including tabla.

== Early career ==
In 1950, Maitra joined Uday Shankar's ballet and dance company, as master drummer. Having established himself as a tabla player, he was asked to master the tabla tarang, an instrument made up of between ten and sixteen tablas, specifically the treble-variety dayan. With each hand drum tuned to a different pitch, producing a range of roughly one and a half octaves, Maitra was able to provide a combined melodic–rhythmic role in performances of ragas or ballet and dance compositions.

While developing the potential of the tabla tarang, he continued his advanced musical studies, learning the lute-like sarod under the tutelage of Ali Akbar Khan. From 1955, Maitra was musical director of Shankar's troupe, for whom he composed and directed music for a wide range of stage productions. During a period of over twenty years, he toured the United States, China, Africa and Europe with the company.

== International career and relocation to Berlin ==
In 1974, Uday's brother Ravi Shankar invited Maitra to join his Music Festival from India revue, sponsored by former Beatle George Harrison, a champion of Indian classical music in the West. Maitra's fellow performers included internationally acclaimed musicians such as Alla Rakha, Lakshmi Shankar, Shivkumar Sharma, Hariprasad Chaurasia, Sultan Khan and L. Subramaniam. Maitra recorded a studio album in England with the Music Festival orchestra – released in 1976 on Dark Horse Records – contributing on tabla tarang, sarod and ektara, before they all undertook a short European tour. The Music Festival from India's debut performance, filmed at London's Royal Albert Hall on 23 September 1974, was released on DVD in 2010, as part of the four-disc box set Ravi Shankar–George Harrison, Collaborations.

Maitra then joined the Music Festival personnel for Harrison's North American tour in November–December 1974, performing in the more jazz-inflected style of Shankar's Shankar Family & Friends crossover album. In keeping with Shankar's efforts to elevate the status of Indian percussionists, Maitra combined with Rakha (on tabla), T.V. Gopalkrishnan (mridangam) and Rijram Desad (pakavaj) in extended, four-way drum soloing – the highlight of their set, and a source of fascination for Harrison's rock drummers Jim Keltner and Andy Newmark. For the finale to the Indian portion of each concert, Maitra and the rest of Shankar's ensemble played with Harrison's entire band, which also included jazz percussionist Emil Richards and saxophonist Tom Scott.

Long interested in the possibilities of Indo–European musical fusion, Maitra performed at the 1976 Meta-Music Festival in Berlin. After moving to Berlin the following year, he began teaching Indian classical instrumentation, and in 1980 formed the Ragatala Ensemble with some of his students, including New York-born tablist Laura Patchen. In 2003, Germany's House of World Cultures (HKW) website wrote of Maitra's music with the Ragatala Ensemble: "The group has enabled him to fulfil his old dream of having his compositions played by a mixed European–Indian orchestra. The pieces follow the rules of classical Indian music but are deliberately fused with elements of European classical music, jazz and new music."

Among his subsequent projects, from 1983 to 1988 Maitra participated in the Nada Brahma – the Whole World is Sound initiative by Joachim-Ernst Berendt; in 1992, as part of Berlin's Indian Festival, his orchestral works were performed at the HKW; and in 2000 he contributed to Festival of Vision – Berlin in Hong Kong. He worked again with Shankar on the soundtrack to the film Genesis (1986), recorded in Paris. In his 1997 autobiography, Raga Mala, Shankar describes Maitra as an "extremely versatile" musician, while the Boston Phoenix once said of his playing: "far from an eccentric novelty, (Maitra) is simply one of the great drummers of India to record in this century." He also worked with Charlie Mariano, an American saxophonist who similarly relocated to Europe during the 1970s, and Israeli clarinetist Giora Feidman.

== Recordings ==
Among Maitra's many recordings, starting with Tabla Tarang – Magnificent Percussion of India (1968) for His Master's Voice, in 1993 he released Masters of Raga: Kamalesh Maitra on Germany's Wergo record label. The album features tabla accompaniment from Kumar Bose. The following year, the Gramophone Company of India issued The Voice of Sarod from the Strokes of Drums – Tabla Tarang by Kamalesh Maitra, on which he played three ragas accompanied by Rakha's son Fazal Qureshi on tabla and Laura Patchen on tambura.

This was followed in 1996 by Tabla Tarang – Melody on Drums, issued in America by Smithsonian Folkways. The album features contributions from Indo–jazz percussionist Trilok Gurtu and Patchen again on tambura. Rough Guides' World Music includes Melody on Drums among its recommended recordings, describing the music as "absolutely compelling" and Maitra as "the acknowledged master of this rare but beautiful sounding instrument". Option magazine heralded the album as "[a] historic world music milestone". The 1998 release Tarang – Kamalesh Maitra Live at the House of the Cultures of the World, recorded with the Ragatala Ensemble in November 1993, contains a performance of "Raga Charukeshi" on which music critic Ken Hunt praises Maitra's playing as "phenomenal".

== Final years and legacy ==
In September 2000, Maitra was awarded the "Musicale Vitale" prize at Berlin's Werkstatt der Kulturen festival. He continued to perform and record with the Ragatala Ensemble until 2003, the same year that he premiered his final orchestral work, Raag Symphonia, in Berlin.

Maitra died on 22 April 2005, aged 76, in Kreischa, near the German city of Dresden. Hunt describes him as a "master musician" and attributes much of his musical vision to the pioneering spirit of Uday Shankar, who "painted the backdrops against which many trained musicians learned to deliver traditional music in a new age for people with no grounding or appreciation of traditional styles of dance or music". Maitra is commonly referred to as the "last master" of the comparatively rare tabla tarang.

== See also ==
- Tabla tarang

== Sources ==
- Collaborations, book accompanying Ravi Shankar–George Harrison Collaborations box set (Dark Horse Records, 2010; produced by Olivia Harrison; package design by Drew Lorimer & Olivia Harrison).
- Olivia Harrison, George Harrison: Living in the Material World, Abrams (New York, NY, 2011; ISBN 978-1-4197-0220-4).
- Peter Lavezzoli, The Dawn of Indian Music in the West, Continuum (New York, NY, 2006; ISBN 0-8264-2819-3).
- Simon Leng, While My Guitar Gently Weeps: The Music of George Harrison, Hal Leonard (Milwaukee, WI, 2006; ISBN 1-4234-0609-5).
- Chip Madinger & Mark Easter, Eight Arms to Hold You: The Solo Beatles Compendium, 44.1 Productions (Chesterfield, MO, 2000; ISBN 0-615-11724-4).
- Daniel M. Neuman, The Life of Music in North India: The Organization of an Artistic Tradition, University of Chicago Press (Chicago, IL, 1990; ISBN 978-0-226-57516-2).
- Robert Rodriguez, Fab Four FAQ 2.0: The Beatles' Solo Years, 1970–1980, Backbeat Books (Milwaukee, WI, 2010; ISBN 978-1-4165-9093-4).
- Ravi Shankar, Raga Mala: The Autobiography of Ravi Shankar, Welcome Rain (New York, NY, 1999; ISBN 1-56649-104-5).
- World Music: The Rough Guide (Volume 2: Latin and North America, Caribbean, India, Asia and Pacific), Rough Guides/Penguin (London, 2000; ISBN 1-85828-636-0).
