= Rijram Desad =

Indian classical musician

- Genres: Indian classical, film score
- Occupations: Musician; teacher
- Instrument(s): Jal tarang, various Indian percussion and string instruments
- Years active: 1940s–1970s

Rijram Desad, often credited as Rij Ram Desad, was an Indian classical musician, multi-instrumentalist and teacher, based in Bombay. Beginning in the early 1940s, he performed on many Indian film soundtracks and in ballet presentations. He was known for his versatility as a musician and his ability to master a wide range of percussion and string instruments. According to cultural historian Naseem Khan, his skill on the jal tarang had become "legendary" by the mid-1970s.

Desad worked with the Hindi cinema playback singer Lata Mangeshkar and played santoor on recordings by the Hindustani ghazal, dadra and thumri vocalist Begum Akhtar. Among his contributions to orchestral projects, he played hand drums in an ensemble led by Ravi Shankar and filmed in Bombay in 1968 for the Shankar documentary Raga (1971). In January 1968, he was among the musicians selected by Shambhu Das, who ran Shankar's Kinnara School of Music in Bombay, to appear on the Wonderwall Music soundtrack album by George Harrison of the Beatles. Desad's contributions to the album included Indian harmonium and tabla tarang. As a result of this project, Desad played harmonium on the Beatles song "The Inner Light", which Harrison recorded during the same sessions. In his notes detailing the contributions of the musicians he worked with in Bombay, Harrison listed him as "Rij-Ram (Everything) Desad".

In 1974, Desad was one of the musicians and singers handpicked by Shankar for his Music Festival from India revue. Sponsored by Harrison, the eighteen-piece orchestra toured Europe, playing a musical program that mixed Indian classical and a wide variety of regional folk styles. Among the percussion instruments played by Desad, he performed on pakavaj beside fellow drummers Alla Rakha (tabla), T.V. Gopalkrishnan (mridangam) and Kamalesh Maitra (tabla tarang). Harrison also produced a studio album by the Music Festival from India; released in 1976, it included contributions from Desad on pakavaj, madal tarang, dholki, nagada, huduk and duff. Following the Music Festival's European tour, he played on Harrison and Shankar's joint North American tour in November and December 1974. For the finale to the Indian portion of these concerts, Desad and the rest of Shankar's ensemble performed with Harrison's band, which also included jazz percussionist Emil Richards and rock drummers Jim Keltner and Andy Newmark.

Desad's versatility led to him redesigning old folk musical instruments for use in a more modern and varied musical context. Later a teacher, Desad was a mentor to tablist Lalit Mahant, whom he trained in tabla and the tantra vadhya vocal style.
