= Anant Lal =

- Born: 1927; Varanasi, Uttar Pradesh, India
- Died: 3 March 2011 (aged 84)
- Genre: Hindustani classical
- Occupations: Musician, composer, teacher
- Instruments: Shehnai, bansuri

Anant Lal (1927 – 3 March 2011), often referred to by the title Pandit, was an Indian classical musician who played the shehnai. He worked for All India Radio and played with artists such as Ravi Shankar and Debu Chaudhuri in addition to recording under his own name. Lal was one of the leading exponents of the shehnai in Hindustani classical music. In 1989, he received the Sangeet Natak Akademi Award, the highest recognition afforded artists in India.

== Early life and background ==
Lal was born in Varanasi (or Benares), in the northern Indian province of Uttar Pradesh, in 1927. The oboe-like shehnai had been a musical instrument played in his family for over 200 years. He initially received tuition on the instrument from his father, Pandit Mithai Lal, as well as his uncles from the age of nine. Later, Lal became a student of thumri vocal teacher Pandit Mahadev Prasad Mishra of Varanasi.

In addition to the shehnai, Lal played bamboo flute, known as the bansuri. Following the example of master musician Bismillah Khan, he dedicated his musical career to furthering the role of the shehnai in Hindustani classical music, since the instrument had traditionally been reserved for religious ceremonies.

== Career ==
Lal established himself as a staff artist for All India Radio. He worked with the company until 1987. Among his works as a performer and recording artist in India, he played with sitar virtuosos Ravi Shankar and Debu Chaudhuri.

In 1974, Shankar chose Lal to join his Music Festival from India revue, which was the largest Indian orchestra to perform in Europe up to that time. In addition to recording a studio album in England with Shankar's ensemble, released on George Harrison's Dark Horse Records in 1976, Lal toured Europe with the Music Festival. His fellow performers included several leading figures of Indian classical music – among them, Alla Rakha, Lakshmi Shankar, Shivkumar Sharma, Hariprasad Chaurasia, Sultan Khan and L. Subramaniam. As on the Music Festival from India album, Lal's featured spot as a soloist was on the piece "Kajri". The debut performance by the Music Festival ensemble, filmed at London's Royal Albert Hall on 23 September 1974, was released on DVD in 2010, as part of Shankar and Harrison's four-disc box set Collaborations.

Lal's own recordings include Splendour in Shehnai, issued in 1990 on the T-Series record label. Also a teacher, in the Benares gharana tradition, his students included modern shehnai players Shanjeev Shankar and Daya Shankar (Lal's son). His grandson, Anand Shankar, also trained under Lal, before dedicating himself to the tabla.

In 1984, Lal received the Uttar Pradesh Sangeet Natak Akademi Award. Five years later, he was honoured with a national Sangeet Natak Akademi Award, the highest recognition afforded artists in India.

Lal died on 3 March 2011, aged 84, from a heart attack. Along with Daya Shankar, his musician sons include shehnai player Ashok Kumar and flautist Vijay Kumar.

== Sources ==
- Keith Badman, The Beatles Diary Volume 2: After the Break-Up 1970−2001, Omnibus Press (London, 2001; ISBN 0-7119-8307-0).
- Collaborations, book accompanying Ravi Shankar and George Harrison's Collaborations box set (Dark Horse Records, 2010; produced by Olivia Harrison; package design by Drew Lorimer & Olivia Harrison).
- Peter Lavezzoli, The Dawn of Indian Music in the West, Continuum (New York, NY, 2006; ISBN 0-8264-2819-3).
- Simon Leng, While My Guitar Gently Weeps: The Music of George Harrison, Hal Leonard (Milwaukee, WI, 2006; ISBN 1-4234-0609-5).
- World Music: The Rough Guide (Volume 2: Latin and North America, Caribbean, India, Asia and Pacific), Rough Guides/Penguin (London, 2000; ISBN 1-85828-636-0).
