= Duggi =

Duggi may refer to:

- Duggi, bass drum, part of the tabla duet
- Duggi (drum), traditional drum that accompanies shehnai and bauls musicians
- Duggi (town), a town in Tenerife, Canary Islands, Spain
