= Jan Steward =

American photographer (1929–2020)

- Born: Janis June England; January 2, 1929; Missouri
- Died: July 1, 2020; Van Nuys, California
- Occupation(s): Photographer, artist, writer

Jan Steward (January 2, 1929 – July 1, 2020), born Janis June England, was an American photographer, artist, graphic designer, and writer based in Los Angeles, California.

== Early life ==
Janis June England was born in Missouri and raised in Los Angeles, the daughter of Sherman Alexander England and Pauline Marie Hoppes England. She attended John Marshall High School in Los Feliz. As a young woman, she studied koto with musician Kimio Eto in Little Tokyo. Beginning in 1958, she took night classes in art from Sister Corita Kent at Immaculate Heart College.

== Career ==
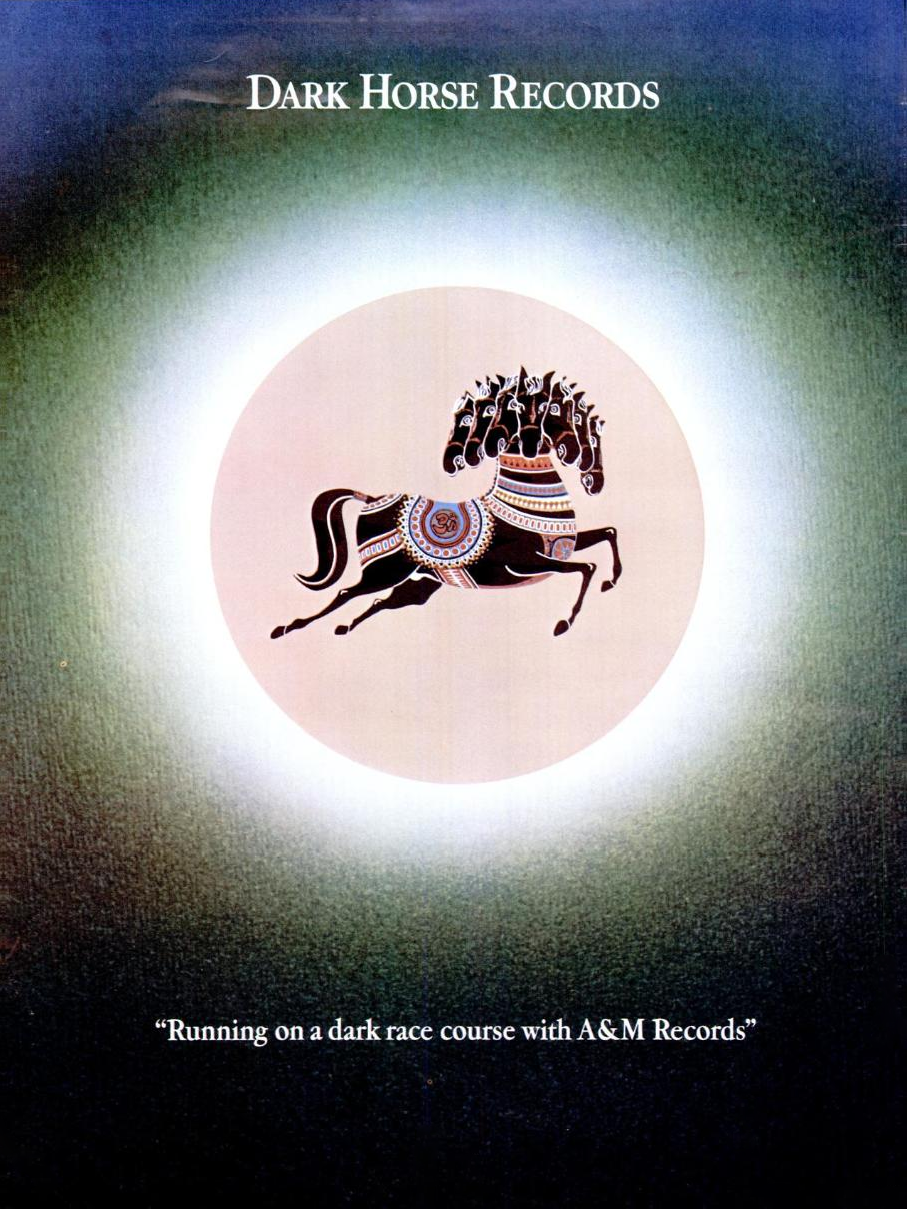
Dark Horse Records ad, 1974; logo designed by Jan Steward.

Steward wrote a book with her mentor Corita Kent, Learning by Heart: Teachings to Free the Creative Spirit (1992, revised 2008), published after Kent's death. Steward's graphic design work included the logo for George Harrison's Dark Horse record label, banners for the 1984 Summer Olympics, and a mural at the Lou Harrison House in Joshua Tree in 2009. She photographed and made cover art for musicians including Harrison, The Mother Hips, Hariprasad Chaurasia, Ravi Shankar, Lakshmi Shankar, and Jitendra Abhisheki, and sometimes accompanied them on recordings. She opened her home in Los Feliz for art exhibits and intimate concerts, and rented studio space to younger artists.

In 1969, Steward spoke at the Pasadena Art Museum about collecting Indian art. In 1970, she and another woman sponsored Indian artist Shanti Dave's sons Mayur and Amul to receive medical care in the United States.

== Personal life ==
Janis England married Frank Herbert "Herb" Steward in 1951. They had two children, Sean and Tina. Herb Steward died in 1992. Jan Steward died in 2020, in Van Nuys, California, aged 91 years. Her memorial service was held at the Senshin Buddhist Temple.
