= Gingger Shankar =

American singer-songwriter

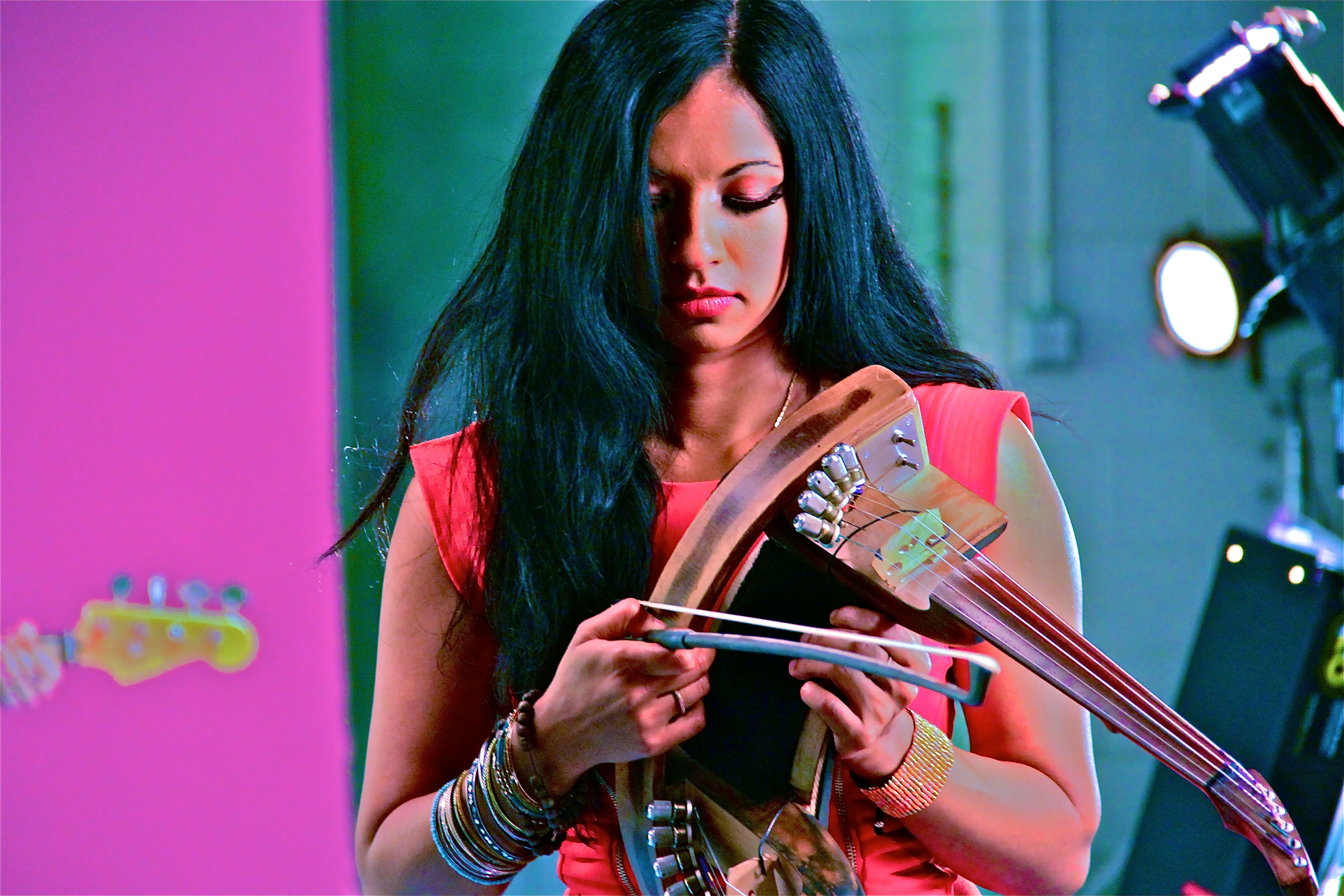

Background information
- Also known as: Gingger Shankar
- Born: Niranjani Subramaniam
- Origin: Los Angeles, United States
- Genres: Pop rock, Rock, Electronic rock, World, Carnatic
- Occupations: Singer-songwriter, violinist, composer
- Instruments: Vocals, double violin, violin, viola
- Years active: 2003—present
- Labels: Sony, Varese Sarabande, Milan Records, Universal
- Website: ginggershankar.com

Gingger Shankar (born Niranjani Subramaniam; in Los Angeles) is an American singer, composer and multi-instrumentalist. She has scored several films, including Circumstance.

== Early life ==
Shankar was born in Los Angeles, California and raised there and in India. She is the eldest daughter of violinist Dr. L. Subramaniam. Her mother, Viji Subramaniam, was a classical singer just like her grandmother Lakshmi Shankar, sister-in-law of noted sitarist Ravi Shankar. As a child, she learned to sing, dance, and play violin and piano and attended the Kalakshetra creative arts school in Chennai, Tamil Nadu. Later, she studied opera vocals with professional opera singer Tantoo Cardinal in Sherman Oaks, California. She also modeled and acted in stage productions. She began performing professionally at age 14.

== Instruments ==
Shankar plays the violin, cello and piano. She is the only woman in the world to play the double violin. This ten-string, stereophonic instrument covers the entire orchestral range, including double bass, cello, viola and violin.

== Career ==
=== Motion pictures ===
In 2004, she performed on the score of composer John Debney for the movie The Passion of the Christ.

She is also credited as a performer on the score the 2007 film Charlie Wilson's War, alongside composer James Newton Howard.

Shankar contributed to the 2008 film The Forbidden Kingdom.

She composed music for the 2011 film, Circumstance, which won the Sundance Audience Choice Award.

In 2012, she debuted her multi-media project Himalaya Song at the Sundance Film Festival. It was a project about climate change in the Himalayas with live film, narration and music created by Gingger, Mridu Chandra and Dave Liang of the Shanghai Restoration Project. It was chosen as one of the 10 Best Music Films at Sundance by Rolling Stone Magazine.

In May 2013, Monsoon Shootout, a thriller she scored for director Amit Kumar premiered at the Cannes Film Festival.

In 2014, Brahmin Bulls, a film she scored for director Mahesh Pailoor opened in the US. Starring Sendhil Ramamurthy, Roshan Seth and Mary Steenburgen, it won film festival awards.

In 2015, she composed the music for the virtual reality 'Project Syria' created by Nonny De La Peña which premiered at the Sundance Film Festival.

=== Musician ===
Shankar has performed in numerous festivals and venues alongside acts such as Smashing Pumpkins, Tony Levin, Steve Vai, Steve Lukather and Sussan Deyhim.

She performs on a track in the 2007 Saul Williams album Niggy Tardust, produced by Trent Reznor.

In July 2008, Shankar appeared in two Sgt. Pepper's 40th-anniversary concerts at the Hollywood Bowl.

On July 16, 2012, she appeared in the music video "Love All Humans" alongside guitarist Anthony Gallo, actress Kate Kelton, model Tara Bre and others.

In 2014, she performed at the George Fest in Los Angeles with the Flaming Lips honoring George Harrison. Other artists included Weird Al Yankovic, Brandon Flowers, Norah Jones, Dhani Harrison, Brian Wilson and more.

In 2014 she released music video cover of U2's Sunday Bloody Sunday directed by Nicholas Bruckman through Paste Magazine.

== Discography ==
=== Original ===
- 2019: Article 15

=== Film scores ===
- 2008: The Forbidden Kingdom
- 2011: Circumstance
- 2011: Homecoming Film
- 2011: Bedouin
- 2012: 419
- 2012: Himalaya Song – Collaboration with Shanghai Restoration Project
- 2013: Dose of Reality
- 2013: The Missing Tomb National Geographic
- 2013: Monsoon Shootout
- 2014: Girl, Adopted Documentary
- 2014: Brahmin Bulls
- 2014: Water & Power
- 2014: Katiyabaaz Documentary
- 2014: Teacher in a Box- ITVS
- 2016: AWOL
- 2016: Six LA Love Stories
- 2018: Heartbeats

=== Music albums ===
- 2003: Enlightenment – L. Shankar, Zakir Hussain, Vikku Vinayakram
- 2008: The Inevitable Rise and Liberation of NiggyTardust! – Saul Williams
- 2010: Anywhere But Here – Solo EP
