= Shrikrishan Sharma =

Indian musician (born 1959)

Pt. Shri Krishan Sharma
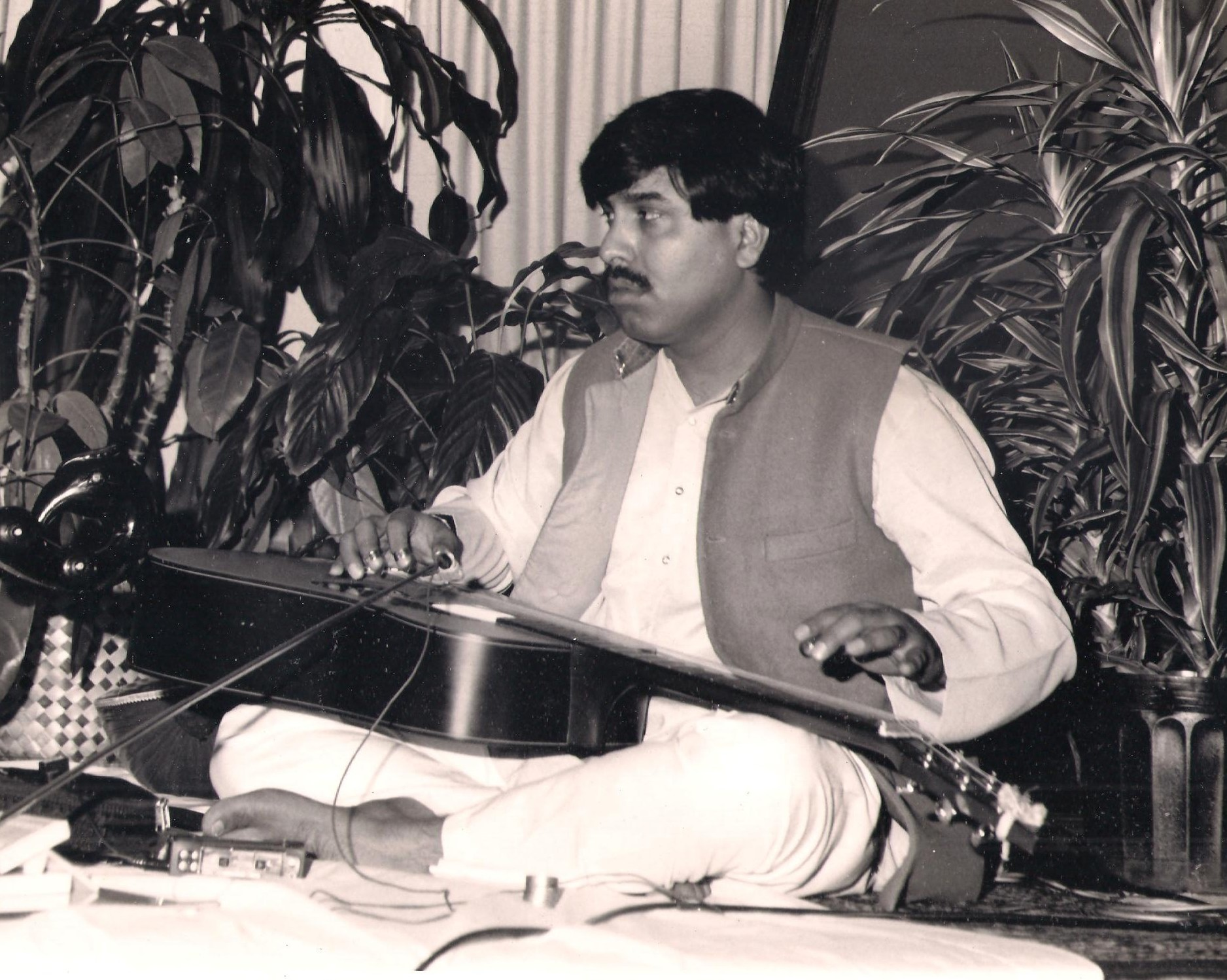
- Concert Performance at Berkeley

Background information
- Born: 23 July 1959 (age 67)
- Origin: Bhiwani, Haryana, Delhi, India
- Genre: Indian classical music
- Occupation: Guitarist
- Instruments: Guitar and Vichitra Veena
- Years active: 1966 - present

Pandit Shri krishan Sharma is an Indian musician. He hails from a family of musicians. His initial training in music came from the "Guru Shishya Parampara" from his father, Pandit Gopal Krishan Sharma the foremost Vichitra Veena maestro. He has given concerts in places such as Delhi, Kolkata, Gwalior, Chennai, Jaipur, Bhopal, Maihar, Lucknow, Banaras, Indore, Pune, Agra, Goa and Shimla. He performed in America, Mauritius, Réunion and the Netherlands.

Prominent in his recital is Gayaki Ang, with imaginative Alap, Jod Jhala, Gatkari and Layakari, in which he excels. He featured in programmes broadcast by All India Radio and on television for over three decades. He is a Top Rank artist of All India Radio. He introduced techniques in his repertoire by redirecting a basically Western instrument to perform Indian Classical Music.

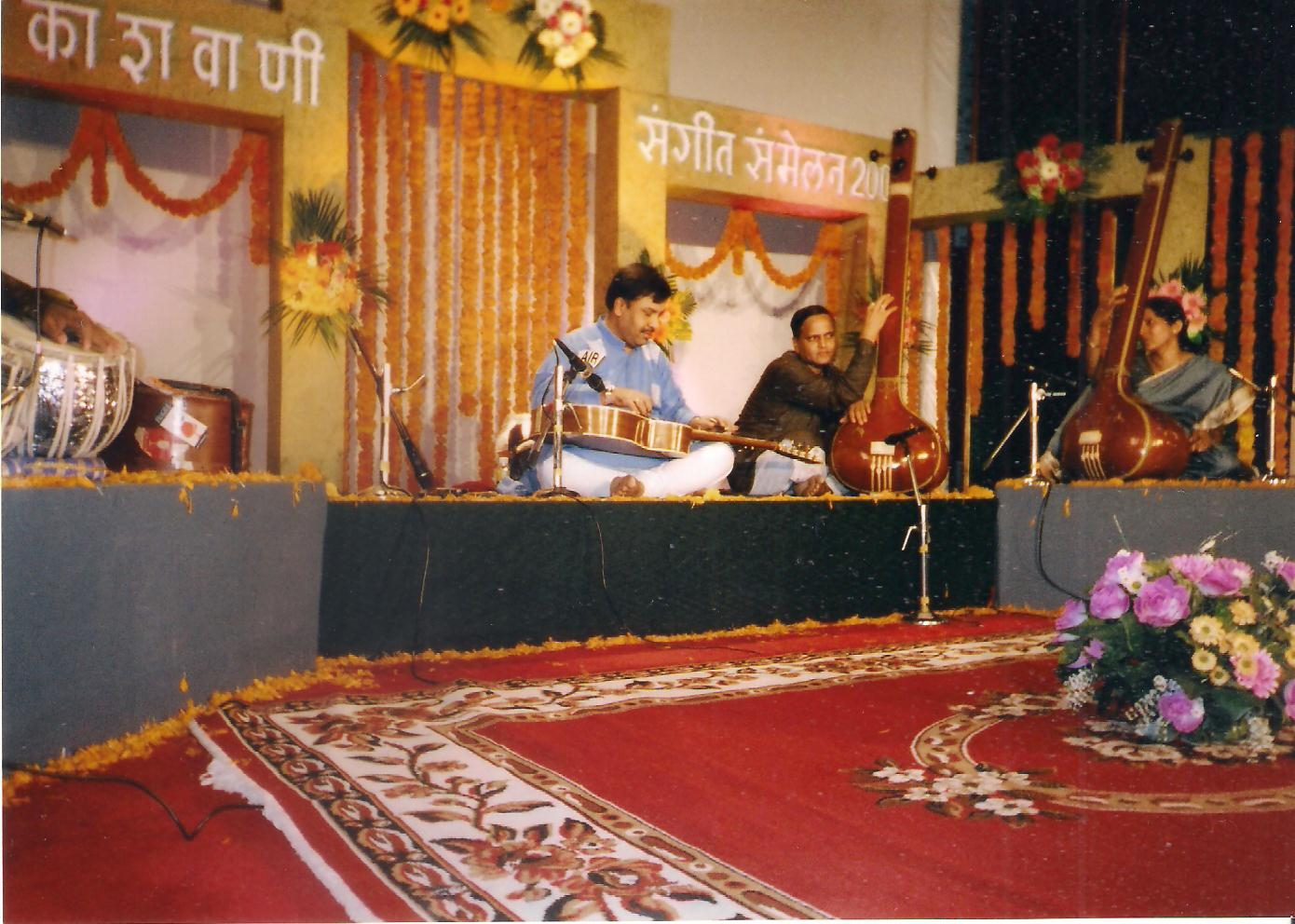
Concert at Pune

== See also ==
- Music of India
