= Viji Subramaniam =

Indian singer (1952–1995)

- Also known as: Viji Shankar
- Born: 15 August 1952; Madras, India
- Died: 10 February 1995 (aged 42) Los Angeles, United States
- Genres: World, Indian classical, film score
- Occupations: Singer, composer
- Instruments: Vocals, tambura

Viji Subramaniam, also known as Viji Shankar, (15 August 1952 – 10 February 1995) was an Indian singer. She was the daughter of singer Lakshmi Shankar (Hindustani vocalist born into a South Indian family) and Rajendra Shankar (elder brother of sitarist Ravi Shankar, a Bengali). Like her mother and uncle, Subramaniam was a musician and trained in both the Indian classical systems.

Subramaniam was born Vijayashree Shankar in Madras into a south Indian Brahmin family and grew up in Bombay. A singer from an early age, she regularly accompanied her mother in concert, often playing tambura also. Among the prizes she received for her performances as a singer on radio and television, Subramaniam won the All India Radio "President of India" medal in 1972. In his 1997 autobiography, Raga Mala, Shankar described her voice as "sweet and lovely".

In addition to performing internationally with Lakshmi, she played tambura at some of Shankar's sitar recitals with tablist Alla Rakha during the early 1970s. In 1974, together with her aunt Kamala Chakravarty and Lakshmi, Viji joined Shankar's Music Festival from India, a revue sponsored by George Harrison. She also sang on the studio album Ravi Shankar's Music Festival from India (1976), produced by Harrison and recorded at his English estate, Friar Park. Following the Music Festival's European concerts in September–October 1974, Subramaniam was among the musicians and singers on Shankar's North American tour with Harrison at the end of that year.

Subramaniam received a master's degree in music from the California Institute of the Arts. She met her husband, Indian classical violinist L. Subramaniam, in London in 1974 while they were both participating in the Music Festival from India. The couple married in 1976, at a three-day ceremony held in Bombay. They had four children: Gingger Shankar, Bindu Subramaniam, Dr. Narayana Subramaniam and Ambi Subramaniam.

With her husband, Viji Subramaniam developed the idea of Global Music, which aims to reduce the dominance of Western music and bring out the importance of other music systems of the world – including Irish, Swedish, Danish, Chinese, African, Japanese and Iranian. It is written for a 100-piece orchestra.

Viji Subramaniam composed and sang on the soundtracks for two films by Indian director Mira Nair: Salaam Bombay! (1988; winner of both the Cannes Film Festival Audience Award and the Academy Award for Best Foreign Language Film) and Mississippi Masala (1991), starring Sarita Choudhary and Denzel Washington.

In 1992 Vijayashree and Subramaniam launched the Lakshminarayana Global Music Festival (LGMF) in memory of her father-in-law. Now an annual feature and held in various cities around the world, this festival brings together eminent Indian and international artists on the same stage. Among those who have performed at LGMF are Yehudi Menuhin, Bismillah Khan, Allah Rakha, Kishan Maharaj, Arve Tellefsen, Malavika Sarukkai and Christian Eggen, in addition to other musicians from countries including India, Norway, Denmark, Sweden, the United States, China, Japan, Cuba, Senegal, Iran and Baluchistan.

Viji Subramaniam died in February 1995 from cancer. Part of one of her vocal performances appears in Violin from the Heart, a 2006 documentary film on L. Subramaniam by French director Jean Henri Meunier. Her daughter Gingger Shakar is a Los Angeles-based violinist and composer of film soundtracks, and has credited Viji's influence in providing her with a diverse musical background, saying: "We'd go to classical concerts and listen to rock music on the way back home. She was a very open-minded person and because of that I was able to soak up so much." Also musicians, Bindu Subramaniam and Ambi Subramaniam were among the featured performers at the 22nd staging of LGMF, held as a six-city Indian tour over December 2013 and January 2014.

== Sources ==
- Collaborations, book accompanying Ravi Shankar–George Harrison Collaborations box set (Dark Horse Records, 2010; produced by Olivia Harrison; package design by Drew Lorimer & Olivia Harrison).
- Olivia Harrison, George Harrison: Living in the Material World, Abrams (New York, NY, 2011; ISBN 978-1-4197-0220-4).
- Peter Lavezzoli, The Dawn of Indian Music in the West, Continuum (New York, NY, 2006; ISBN 0-8264-2819-3).
- Chip Madinger & Mark Easter, Eight Arms to Hold You: The Solo Beatles Compendium, 44.1 Productions (Chesterfield, MO, 2000; ISBN 0-615-11724-4).
- Ravi Shankar, Raga Mala: The Autobiography of Ravi Shankar, Welcome Rain (New York, NY, 1999; ISBN 1-56649-104-5).
