= Kartick Kumar =

Indian Sitarist

- Born: 11 November 1936; Dhaka, Bengal Presidency, British India (now Bangladesh)
- Origin: Kolkata, India
- Genres: Hindustani classical music; Film music
- Occupations: Sitarist; Surbahar player; Music educator
- Instruments: Sitar; Surbahar
- Years active: 1950s–present

Kartick Kumar is an Indian musician and Sitarist, He was also a disciple of Ravi Shankar and father of Niladri Kumar.

In 1958, Kumar was awarded the President's Gold Medal All India Award for sitar at a music competition held by All India Radio. He moved to Mumbai in 1960.
