= Gopal Krishan =

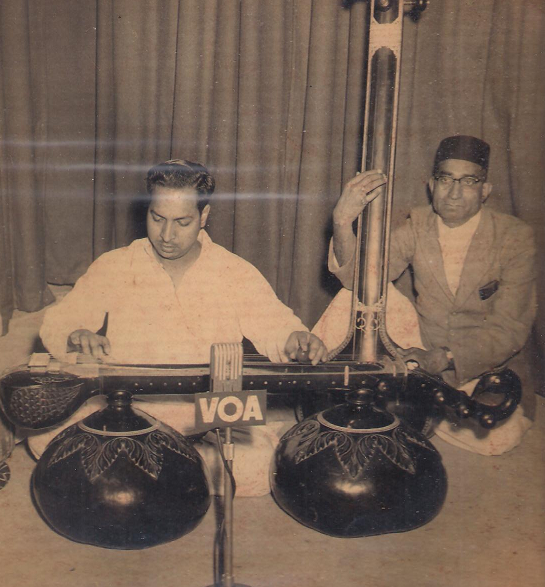
- Pt. Gopal Krishan on Vichitra Veena

Background information
- Born: 26 July 1926; Bhiwani Haryana
- Died: 5 March 2004 (aged 77)
- Genre: Indian classical music
- Occupation: Veenakar
- Instrument: Vichitra veena

Pandit Gopal Krishan Sharma (1926–2004) was an exponent of Vichitra Veena, an ancient Indian musical instrument.

== Early life and Musical Training ==
Gopal Krishan was given initial music lessons by his father, Pandit Nand Kishore, who was himself a noted surbahar player, a vocalist and a student of Pt. Vishnu Digambar Paluskar. After his father's death, Gopal Krishan continued his training in music under the guidance of Pt. Khubchand Bramchari of the Gwalior school of music. He joined All India Radio (AIR) in 1949 and later became an accomplished artist there.

== Skills and Style ==
Gopal Krishan was a versatile musician, possessing the ability to play different instruments like tabla, guitar, and a folk instrument called the ektara. In addition to his musical skill, Gopal Krishan was also a good vocalist. Gopal Krishan was adept at playing ragas in pure forms and skilled with the dhrupad style, aalap, jod and jhala.

His compositions were unique as for the Dhamar as well as the other rhythmic patterns. His jhala playing was a myriad of various patterns of rhythm and mix of strokes of mizrab. This often led to the crescendo which produced a trance like climax before concluding his recital.

He created many new ragas, the most prominent of which being Shiv Onkar, Tilak Malhar and Saraswati Sarang. He composed many orchestra compositions for akashwani, including taar nritya.

== Teaching style and students ==
Gopal Krishnan was known to be a strict guru. His lessons to his disciples were often focused on ensuring the purity of a raga and melodious patterns of rhythm.

His disciples are well known artists. His prominent disciples are— Pandit Shri krishan Sharma (Son, Vichitra Veena & Guitar), Shri Murli Krishan (Sitar), Smt Anubha Banerjee (Sitar), Sh. Rajan Swaroop Rajan (Vocal), Durjoy (vocal), Smriti Madan (sitar), Shruti Kalra (sitar), Smriti Minocha (Vocal), Sh. Umakant Saxena (guitar), Vinay Jain (guitar), Rakesh Jhori (guitar), Sh. Jugal Kishore Jain (jaltarang), Sh. Narendra Lahad (sarod), Pandit Nishindra Kinjalk (Sitar & Surbahar), and Sh. M.C.Gotan (violin).

Gianni Richizzi (Vichitra Veena), Anurag Swarup (Vichitra Veena), Vinay Jain, Ronald Simpson, Doug Bartel and Umesh Chandra are other prominent disciples.

== Awards ==
He was given the Sangeet Natak Academy Award by the Honourable President of India, Dr Shankar Dayal Sharma in the year 1994. He was also conferred the coveted Lichhavi Sangeet Sammaan in 2000.

== See also ==
- Shrikrishan Sharma
