= Gubguba =

Indian percussion string instrument

Guguba
- Other names: guba, gopijantro, gubgubbi, ananda lahari, premtal, khamak, khomok, chonka, jamidika, jamuku
- Classification: Stringed hand percussion instrument
- Hornbostel–Sachs classification: 32 (Composite chordophones)

The gubguba, also known as gabgubagub, guba, gopijantro, gubgubbi, ananda lahari, premtal, khamak, khomok, chonka, jamidika, jamuku and bapang is an Indian percussion string instrument.

It consists of a dried gourd or wooden resonator through which a gut string is attached. The player holds the body of the instrument under the arm and the free end of the string in the fist of the same arm. The string is plucked with a plectrum in the other hand. Some varieties of the gubgubbi, particularly the Bengali khomok or khamak, contain two strings.
