= Duggi (drum) =

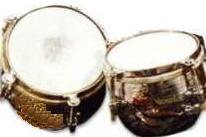
Duggi drums

The duggi, dugi or dukkar is an Indian–Bangladeshi drum, with a kettle drum shape, played with fingers and the palm of the hand. It is used in baul music of the Bengal region (both Bangladesh and India). It is also employed in folk music of Uttar Pradesh (duggi) and Punjab (dukkar).
