= T. V. Gopalakrishnan =

Indian Carnatic and Hindustani musician (born 1932)

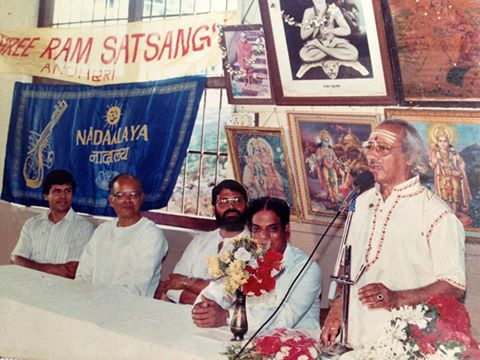
- Picture taken of TVG and T. S. Nandakumar during a speech in Bombay

Background information
- Born: Tripunithura Viswanathan Gopalakrishnan; 11 June 1932 (age 94)
- Origin: Kerala, India
- Occupations: singer, violinist, mridangist

Tripunithura Viswanathan Gopalakrishnan (born 11 June 1932 in Tripunithura, Kerala), known as TVG, is a Carnatic and Hindustani musician from Cochin, Kerala, India. He was awarded the Madras Music Academy's Sangeetha Kalanidhi in 2014.

== Early years ==
Gopalakrishnan was born on 11 June 1932 into a family of musicians with a history spanning over two centuries. His father, T.G. Viswanatha Bhagavathar, was a court musician for the Cochin Royal Family and a professor of music at the S.K.V. College in Thrissur. Gopalakrishnan was the eldest child of his parents, who totally had nine siblings. started playing the mridangam at the age of four and had his arangetram at the Cochin palace at the age of six. He is a disciple of Chembai Vaidyanatha Bhagavathar.

Gopalakrishnan is married to Radha. The couple have 3 children – two sons named Viswanath (Late), Ramanathan, and one daughter named Aparna Raghavan. Ramanathan is a leading saxophone artist who is also a disciple of Kadri Gopalnath. The popular violinist T.V. Ramani and ghatam exponent T. V. Vasan were his siblings.

== Career ==
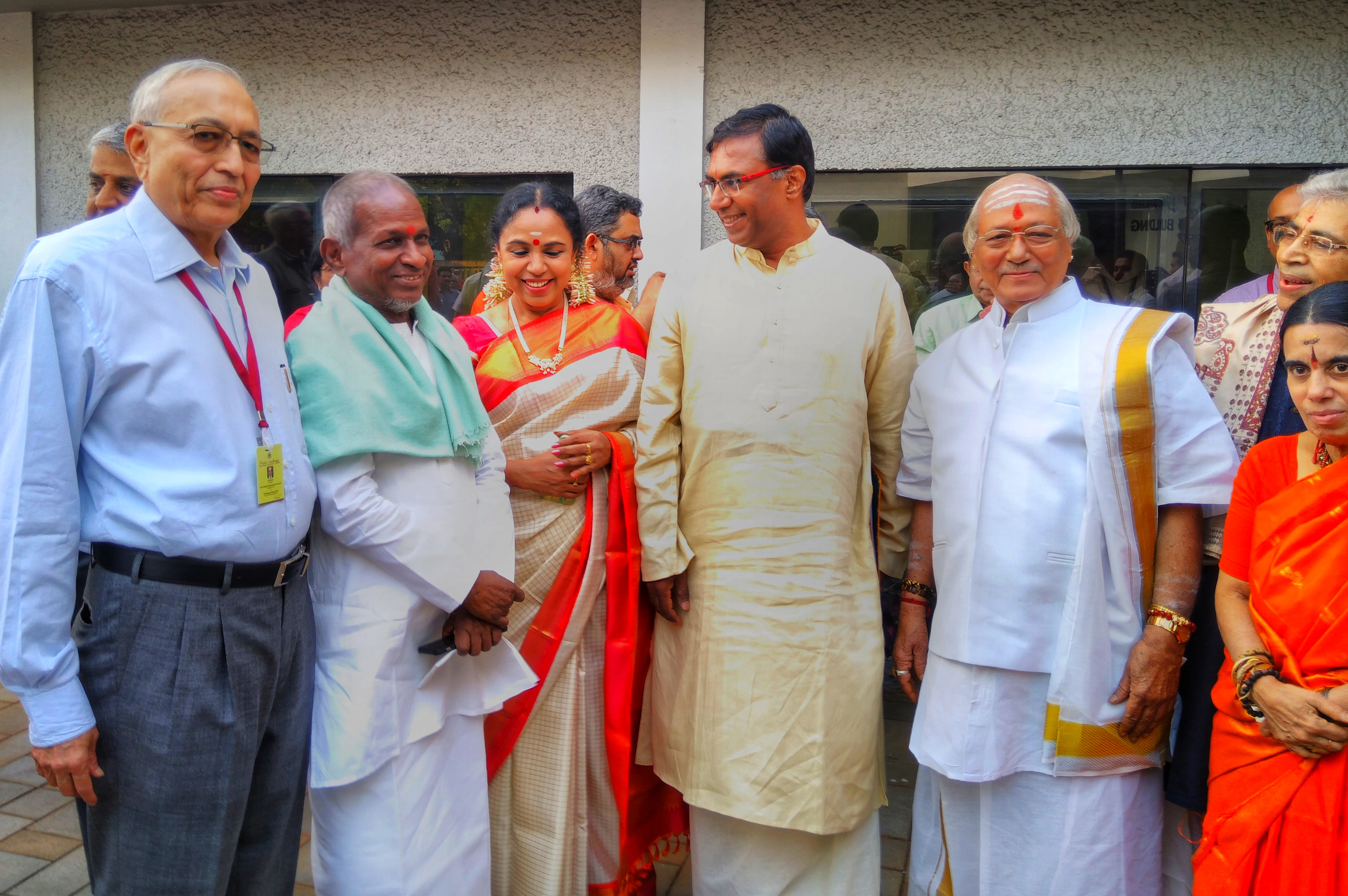
Gopalakrishnan with A. Kanyakumari, Ilaiyaraaja, N. Ravikiran, Sudha Ragunathan, and others

He is a musician who is equally proficient in both Carnatic and Hindustani vocals, mridangam and violin. TVG has toured with George Harrison, Bob Dylan, John Handy, Ravi Shankar, and Ustad Alla Rakha. He has also collaborated with drummer/composer Franklin Kiermyer, Don Peake, Seigfried Kutterer and Carola Grey.

Gopalakrishnan was given the Sangeet Natak Akademi Award in 1990. He has been awarded the Padma Bhushan by the Government of India in the year 2012.

In 2018, he was awarded a doctorate by Bharatidasan University for his research on the topic "Layathwam in Carnatic music".

== Discography ==
This is an incomplete list of releases. The release dates are also not always indicative of the original release date of the associated record.

- Percussion Through the Ages in South India (instructional) (1961)
- Melodious Strings of the Indian Violin (featuring T. N. Krishnan) (1991)
- Eastern Beats (solo mridangam) (1995)
- Meeting Sounds of T.V. Gopalakrishnan (featuring M. S. Gopalakrishnan) (2005)
- Maragadamani (2008)

== Awards ==
In his career spanning over five decades, many honours and awards have been bestowed on Gopalakrishnan. These include:

- Sangeetha Kalanidhi Award from Madras Music Academy, 2014
- Padma Bhushan, 2012
- Kerala Sangeetha Nataka Akademi Fellowship, 2006
- Kerala Sangeetha Nataka Akademi Award, 1983
- Sangeet Natak Akademi Award
- Sangita Laya Samrat
- Rotary International Exemplary Citizen Award
- Kalaimamani
- Life Time Achievement award from Bangalore Ramaseva Mandali
- Swati Tirunall Lifetime Achievement Award
- Sapthagiri Sangeetha Vidwan Mani Award (Tirupathi)
- Legend of India Life Achievement Award
- "Arsha Kala Bhushanam" (H.H. Dayananda Saraswathi Life Time Achievement Award)
- Lifetime National Achievement Sankaracharya Award (Bombay), etc.
- Mudhra Award for excellence
- Lifetime achievement award from Bharath Kalachar, etc.
