= Lakshmi Shankar =

Indian singer (1926–2013)

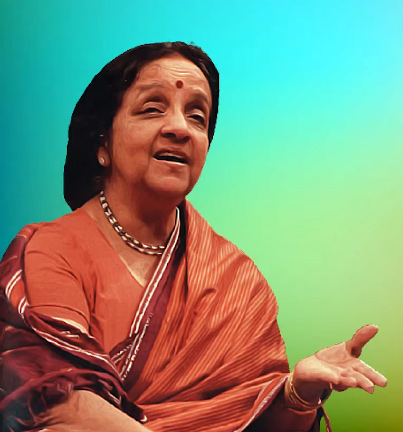
- Lakshmi Shankar singing in a concert

Background information
- Born: Lakshmi Shastri; 16 June 1926; Jamshedpur, Bihar, (now in Jharkhand) British India
- Died: 30 December 2013 (aged 87) Simi Valley, California, United States
- Genres: Hindustani classical
- Occupations: Singer, dancer
- Spouse: Rajendra Shankar (m. 1941)

Lakshmi Shankar (née Shastri, 16 June 1926 – 30 December 2013) was an Indian singer and a noted Hindustani classical. Born into a south Indian Hindu family, she became an outstanding Hindustani vocalist of the Patiala Gharana and married Rajendra Shankar, brother of Uday Shankar, a Bengali by birth. She was known for her performances of khyal, thumri, and bhajan. She was the sister-in-law of sitar player Ravi Shankar and the mother-in-law of violinist L. Subramaniam (her daughter Viji (Vijayashree Shankar) Subramaniam being his first wife).

== Biography ==
Born in 1926, Lakshmi Shankar started her career in dancing. Her father Bhimrao Shastri was a noted Sanskritist who took active participation in India's struggle for freedom and was a close associate of Mahatma Gandhi. She was the co-editor of 'Harijan'. In 1939, when Uday Shankar brought his dance troupe to Madras (recently renamed Chennai), she joined the Almora Centre to learn Shankar's dance style based on the Indian classics, and became a part of the troupe. In 1941, she married Uday Shankar's younger brother, Rajendra (nicknamed Raju). Her sister Kamala was also a dancer at Uday Shankar's ballet troupe.

During a period of illness, Lakshmi Shankar had to give up dancing, and already having had a background of Carnatic music, she undertook learning Hindustani classical music for many years under Ustad Abdul Rehman Khan. Later, she also trained with Ravi Shankar, the sitar maestro and youngest brother of Rajendra and Uday.

In 1974, Lakshmi Shankar performed in Europe as part of Ravi Shankar's Music Festival from India. Late that same year, she toured North America with Ravi Shankar and George Harrison, who produced the Shankar Family & Friends album (1974), including the pop single "I Am Missing You" with vocals by Lakshmi Shankar. Following Ravi Shankar's heart attack during the tour, she conducted his ensemble of musicians.

Lakshmi Shankar has shown her versatility and adaptability by composing music for Bharatanatyam for the leading dance company Shakti School of Bharatanatyam, located in Los Angeles.

Shankar died on 30 December 2013 in California.

== Discography ==
LP records

• Nirmala Devi & Lakshmi Shankar - The Gramophone Company of India, India, 1968

- The Voice of Lakshmi Shankar – World Pacific, US, 1969
- Le chant indien, classique et dévotionnel – Stil discothèque, France, 1976
- Les Heures et les Saisons – Ocora, France, studio 107 de Radio France 1983, 1987

CDs

- Les Heures et les Saisons – Ocora, France, studio 107 de Radio France 1983, 1989
- Chants de dévotion / Songs of Devotion – Auvidis (Ethnic), France, 1990
- Live Concert from Los Angeles – Ravi Shankar Music Circle, US
- Jai Uttal Footprints, featuring Lakshmi Shankar and Don Cherry – Triloka, Los Angeles, California, US, 1990
- Live in London – Navras, UK
- Bhakti Ras (Live in London, Vol. 2, September 1992) – Navras, UK, 1995
- Shringar: Thumris – Music Today, India
- Ecstasy – Audiorec, 1991
- Amrut Ras, Lakshmi Shankar sings songs from the devotional tradition – Audiorec Classics UK (Cat No 766032 1055-2), 2003
- Divine Love – Navras UK, 2005, 2006
- A life of dedication – Navras UK, 2006, 2006
- Dancing in the Light – World Village, recorded live, 9 April 2005 at On the Path Studio, Santa Monica, California, US, 2008

Cassettes

- Live in London – Navras, UK
- Bhakti Ras – Navras, UK
- Songs of the Seasons – Music Today, India
- Shringar: Thumris – Music Today, India
- Thumris – His Master's Voice – India
- Lakshmi Shankar Vocal with Zakir Hussain and L. Subramaniam – His Master's Voice, India
