= Shahid Parvez =

Indian musician (born 1954)

Shahid Parvez Khan
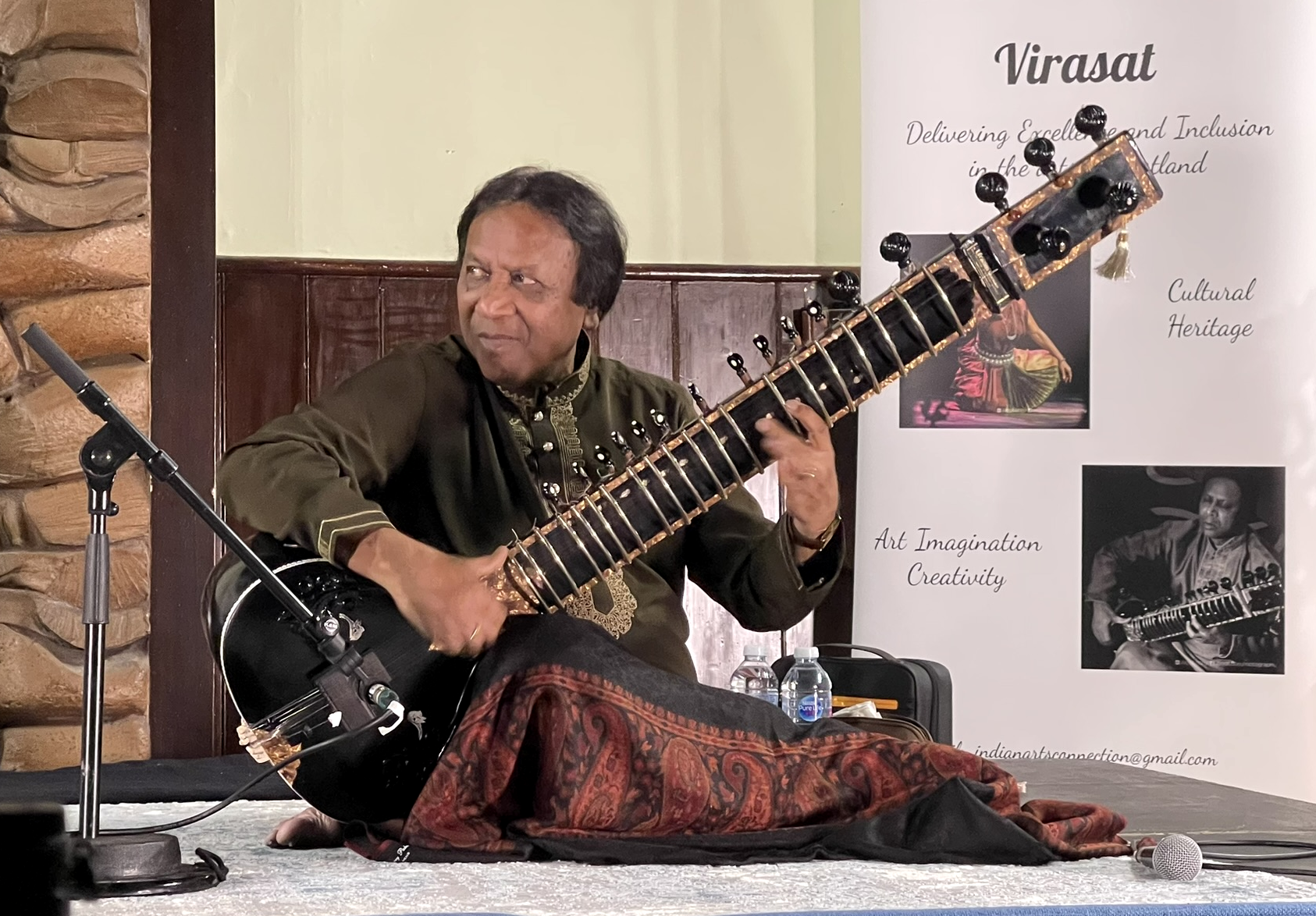
- Shahid Parvez in 2026
- Born: Shahid Parvez Khan; 14 October 1954 (age 71); Mumbai, India
- Occupation: Sitar Maestro for Indian classical music
- Years active: 1965 – present
- Awards: Padma Shri Award in 2012; Sangeet Natak Akademi Award in 2006
- Website: Official site

Shahid Parvez Khan (commonly known as Shahid Parvez; born 14 October 1954) is an Indian classical sitar maestro from the Imdadkhani gharana. He represents the seventh generation of the Etawah Gharana as its primary exponent. He is praised especially for the vocalistic phrasing and quality of his raga improvisations, known as "Gayaki ang". This translates to "singing branch/limb" ("branch" and "limb" referring here to musical style). The sitar legend Ustad Vilayat Khan resurrected and re-introduced Gayaki Ang as a widely accepted sitar genre in India and abroad, and his nephew, Ustad Shahid Parvez Khan, has carried this torch into the present day.

== Early life and musical training ==
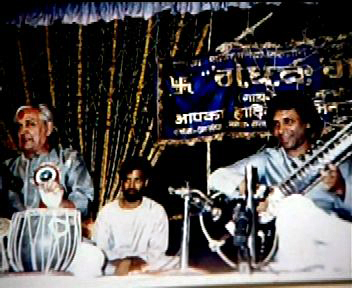
Ustad Shahid Parvez Khan, sitar maestro performing at a concert accompanied by Pandit Kishan Maharaj

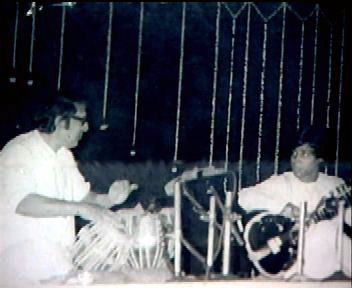
young Shahid Parvez Khan, sitarist performing at a concert accompanied by Pandit Samta Prasad of the Benaras Gharana

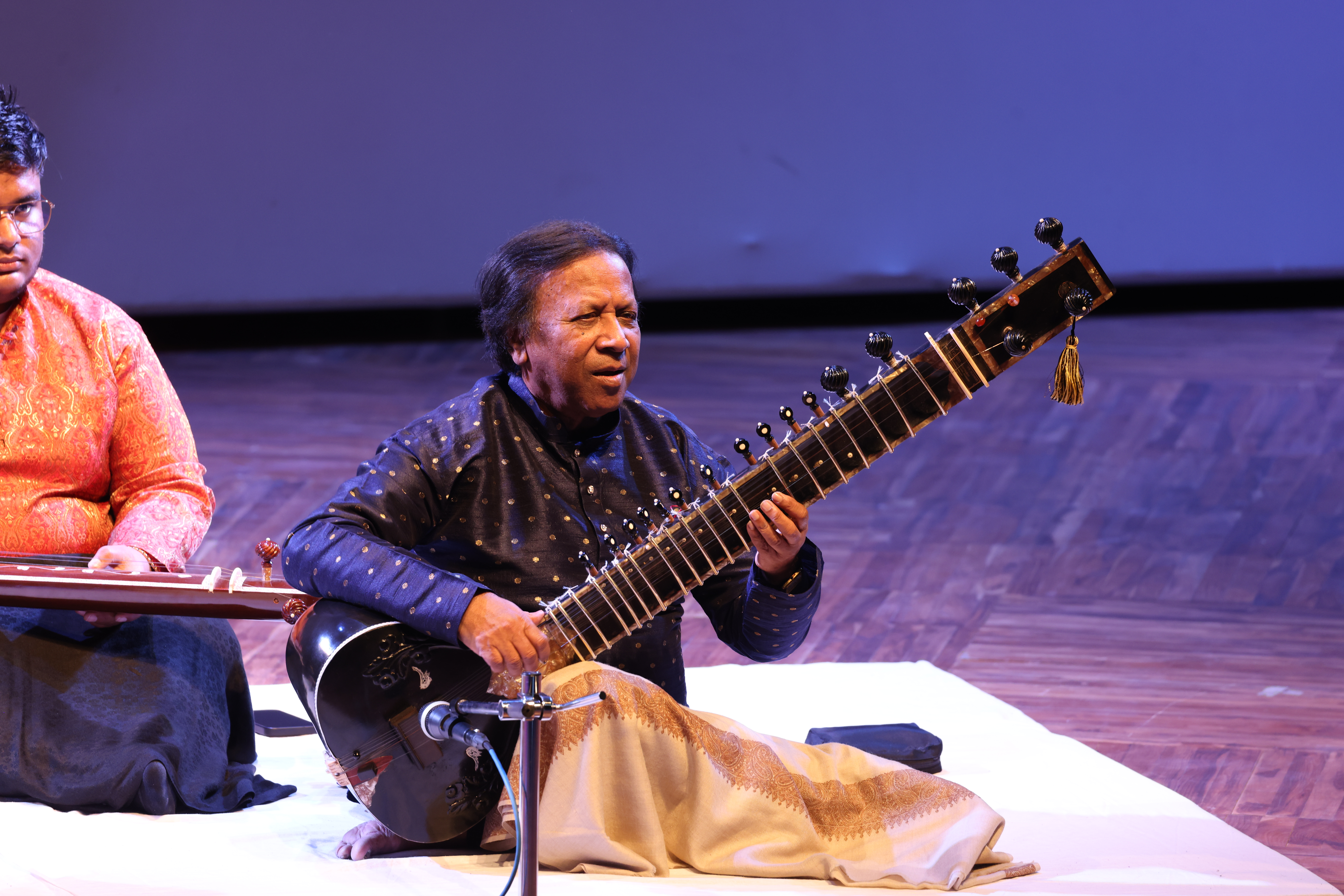
Shahid Parvez performing at IIT Mandi, Himachal Pradesh, 2025

Born in Mumbai, India, Ustad Shahid Parvez Khan was trained by his father Ustad Aziz Khan, who was the son of the sitar and surbahar player Wahid Khan. As is the custom among musical families with a storied lineage, Aziz Khan first initiated his son into vocal music and tabla before training him on the Sitar over many years. Shahid's uncle, Hafeez Khan (a prominent singer and surbahar/sitar player), also trained him. He also trained extensively in the art of tabla for over 10 years under Munnu Khan of the Delhi Gharana.

His family has produced many instrumentalists in Hindustani classical music, including Imdad Khan (his great-grandfather), Enayat Khan, Wahid Khan (his grandfather) and Vilayat Khan.

== Performing career ==
Ustad Shahid Parvez Khan has performed in all major musical festivals in India and abroad, including the Festival of India held in the US, Europe, USSR, Canada, Africa, the Middle East and Australia. He has a distinguished performance career in India and around the world.

A major Indian English-language newspaper says he is "considered Indian classical music personified and a synonym for the sitar. A leading exponent of the Etawah gharana, which produced legends like Imdad Khan, Enayat Khan and Vilayat Khan, Shahid Parvez is known for his rendition".

The French-language publication Le Devoir, based in Montréal, Canada, says this about the Ustad:

The maestro embodies the Etawah Gharana style, which was developed by one of the oldest music schools in India. Here, the particularity is to give an echo to the human voice at the end of the strings, or rather from the resonance chamber of the sitar. Having heard it in 2010, we can say that the effect is striking. The technique makes it possible to tame genres, such as the dhrupad, which is said to be the oldest song in North India, and the khayal, which is that of the great virtuosos. It's all built into the music.

Shahid Parvez Khan marries this with the techniques of tantrakari, which allows him to explore all kinds of rhythmic patterns with the right hand.

== Students ==
Ustad Shahid Parvez's notable students include Shakir Khan and Sameep Kulkarni.

== Awards and honours ==
- Kalajyoti Lifetime Achievement Award (2020)
- Sangeet Natak Akademi Award in 2006
- Padma Shri Award in 2012
- AIR – Top Grade artist
- Sur Shringaar
- Kumar Gandharva Samman
- M. L. Koser Award
