= Ramprapanna Bhattacharya =

Indian classical musician

Ramprapanna Bhattacharya is an Indian classical sitarist of the Etawah Gharana.

== Early life ==
He began his sitar training at the age of six from his father in Kolkata, India. He also received musical training from Kashinath Mukherjee and Arvind Parikh, both senior disciples of Vilayat Khan.

He is the recipient of a scholarship from the Ministry of Culture, India. He has performed and given workshops in different cities in India including Kolkata, Hyderabad, Mumbai, Nagpur, Ahmedabad, Delhi, Bhopal, Puna, Jaipur, Ajmer, Satara and out of India, notably United Kingdom including London, Peterborough, Edinburgh, Glasgow, Chelmsford, Leeds etc. Ramprapanna obtained bachelor's degrees in Electronics & Communication Engineering and also has a corporate job.
