= Mushtaq Ali Khan =

Indian classical sitar player (1911–1989)

Mushtaq Ali Khan (20 June 1911 – 21 July 1989) and was an Indian classical sitar, surbahar (and pakhawaj) player who was born in Banaras.

== Training and lineage ==
Khan learnt music from his father, Ashiq Ali Khan, who had learned sitar from the 19th century player Barkatullah Khan, a descendant of Masit Sen of Delhi, the inventor of the Masitkhani gat (the major style of slow musical composition in sitar playing) His name became synonymous with the Senia style although he may actually have practised an even more austere style than his predecessors in the gharana. He eschewed much of the ornamentation of modern sitar technique (such as murki and zamzama), and embraced a clean, pure sound. His alap was constructed along the lines of a dhrupad alap, and his jod and jhala derived a lot from rudra vina technique. Oddly enough, in spite of being a musical descendant of Masit Sen, he rarely played Masitkhani gats in public, and none of the commercially available examples of his music includes one. He opted to play the faster Rezakhani gats instead, feeling that playing Masitkhani gats to an undiscerning audience would cause them to be devalued.

At first a court musician at Jaunpur, Mushtaq Ali left the court to pursue an independent career. He started playing for All India Radio in 1929, and performed at the 1931 Sangeet Sammelan (music conference) in Allahabad. For all of the 1940s and most of the 1950s he was considered the most prominent sitar player in India, following the demise of Enayat Khan of the Etawah Gharana, and prior to the rise of the young Nikhil Banerjee, Ravi Shankar and Vilayat Khan in the mid-1950s. In 1968 he won the Sangeet Natak Akademi Award, the highest Indian recognition given to practising artists, given by Sangeet Natak Akademi, India's National Academy of Music, Dance and Drama.

Being a purist, Khan-Saheb refused to yield to shifting popular tastes and to adopt the innovations introduced by Ravi Shankar on one hand and Vilayat Khan on the other, which led to a gradual decline in his popularity. At the time of his death he was known as a "musicians' musician". Many of India's best known musicians expressed their appreciation of the purity of his style and musicality in a book published in Delhi after his death

== Instruments ==
Mushtaq Ali Khan belonged to the Senia Gharana. He was the only surbahar player of India who used to play the been-ang with three mizrabs and that too, with the pakhawaj as an accompanying instrument only in pure dhrupad style.

In a rare exclusive interview in the Daily Telegraph on 13 July 1985, Khan Sahab narrated the history of this instrument with historical references in which he has cleared the myth of this instrument. Khan Sahab had his lineage with fifth vani, called Dhandvani named after one of the forefathers. The famous dhrupadiya of Shah Jahans Court, Nayak Dhundhu. It is also called Rasal Vani for its beauty. He said, "... two of my ancestors, Jaggu Khan and Makku Khan. Since Makku Khan was childless, he adopted Waras Ali Khan a great name who learnt the art of playing Been from Bade Mohammed Khan. When my father Ashiq Ali Khan was six years old, my grand father Sadaq Ali Khan, son of Jaggu Khan died so his uncle Waras Ali Khan taught him all intricacies of Beena on the surbahar. That is why we play Surbahar with three Mezrabs. The Surbahar was originally designed to felicitate the playing of Alap. Those days Alap was the exclusive prerogative of the Beenkar. Ghulam Muhammed Khan and his son Sajjad Mohammed Khan the great SurBahar players used to stay at Calcutta in the earliest part of the 20th century and taught many renowned players, including Imdad Khan and Jnanoda Mukherjee. In this instrument two angas played are alap and talparan and that is why the knowledge of pakhawaj is essential to play the Talparan ...".

== Awards ==
Mushtaq Ali Khan was awarded the Sangeet Natak Academy award in 1968 (equivalent to a National Academy Award). In 1973/74 he received the title of D.Litt from Rabindra Bharati University. The Indian government appointed him as the Professor Emeritus in Education and the Cultural Ministry and gave fellowship.

Some of the other musical awards were Sitar Sudhakar – 1932, Tantri Vilas – 1973, Sangeet Ratnakar – 1974, State Academy Award – 1974, Senior fellowship and Emeritus – 1986, Bhuwalka Award – 1987, Tansen Award – 1987, Special Honour University of Delhi – 1987.

== Students ==
He taught many students including Debu Chaudhuri, who has started a cultural Centre in New Delhi under the name of "UMAK (acronym of Ustad Mushtaq Ali Khan) Centre for Culture", with a view to having Mushtaq Ali's music and his ideas alive. His only surbahar student Steven Landsberg lives and teaches in the United States. Mushtaq Ali Khan taught him the technique of three mizrabs and their unique application in tar paran.

== Khan's (late) activities ==
A follower of rasal vani, Khan Sahab was the only surbahar player who maintained the purity of the rasal vani. In 1953 he had a surbahar recital in Raga Puriya, in the First National Programme of the All India Radio New Delhi. It may be recalled that in the year 1953 Pandit Ravi Shankar was instrumental of instituting this National Programme of All India Radio and was present on this memorable occasion.

Mushtag Ali organised conferences where old masters and new artists were introduced to the cognoscenti and the novice. Among the well known names, Ravi Shankar was first presented by him to the public in Calcutta. The Ustad was popular during the early 1930s to the late 1940s.

Mushtaq Ali died on 21 July 1989.
