= Imdad Khan =

Indian sitar and surbahar player (1848–1920)

Ustad Imdad Khan
- Born: 1848; Agra, North-Western Provinces, British Raj
- Died: 1920 (aged 71–72)
- Occupation: Musician
- Style: Hindustani classical music
- Movement: Etawah gharana
- Children: Enayat Khan; Wahid Khan
- Relatives: Vilayat Khan; Imrat Khan; (grandsons): Shahid Parvez; Shujaat Khan; Nishat Khan; Irshad Khan; Wajahat Khan; Shafaatullah Khan; Azmat Ali Khan; Hidayat Khan; (great-grandsons): Zila Khan (great-granddaughter)
- Musical career
- Instruments: Sitar; surbahar

Ustad Imdad Khan (1848–1920) was a sitar and surbahar player. He is notable for being the first sitar player to be recorded.

== Early life and career ==
Imdad Khan was born in Agra, as the fourth generation of what was to become the Imdadkhani Gharana school, or Etawah gharana, named after a village outside Agra where the family soon moved. He was taught by his father, Sahabdad Khan, a trained vocalist and self-taught sitar player, but Khan came to greatly develop and define the family style and techniques. Khan was also trained by Beenkar Bande Ali Khan (disciple and son-in-law of Haddu Khan). In the 19th century, the instrumental classical music of North India was dominated by the Senia style, passed down through the musical dynasty of Tansen's descendants, who played in the dhrupad ang. Khan instead evolved a style based on the newer, more popular, khyal singing. It is said that in his youth in Etawah, Khan practiced on the sitar in a state of chilla (isolation) for some twelve years. When he moved with his family to Kolkata, the house in which they lived was named "Riyaz" (practice).

Sohini Qawwali
Imdad Khan's sitar solo on the Sohini raga (1904)

== Family and background ==
Imdad Khan is considered one of the founders of the Etawah gharana (Imdadkhani gharana) of Hindustani classical music.

His two sons, Enayat and Wahid, his grandsons Vilayat Khan and Imrat Khan, and great-grandsons Shahid Parvez, Shujaat Khan, Nishat Khan, Irshad Khan, Wajahat Khan, Shafaatullah Khan, Azmat Ali Khan and Hidayat Khan, musical luminaries themselves, have upheld his musical tradition.

Zila Khan, the Sufi, classical, and semi-classical singer, is the first female artist from this gharana. She is Vilayat Khan's daughter, whom her father formally made a student also.

Imdad Khan taught the sitar and surbahar to his two sons, Enayat and Wahid, whom he used to refer to as his two hands. Although both of them played the sitar and the surbahar, Enayat specialized in the sitar and Wahid on the surbahar.

== Rajput lineage ==
Khan's family is of Hindu Rajput lineage. The family is of Hindu origin and later converted to Islam. In an informal continuation of his Rajput lineage, Ustad Enayat Khan (father of Ustad Vilayat Khan) kept the Hindu name of Nath Singh. Vilayat Khan himself composed many bandishes using the pen name "Nath Piya".

== Tribute ==
Khan attained great fame in his lifetime: he served as a court musician in Mysore and Indore and was the first sitar player ever to be recorded. Some of these recordings have been released on CD, on the compilatiom Great Gharanas: Imdadkhani within RPG/EMI's Chairman's Choice series.
