= Dhruv Bedi =

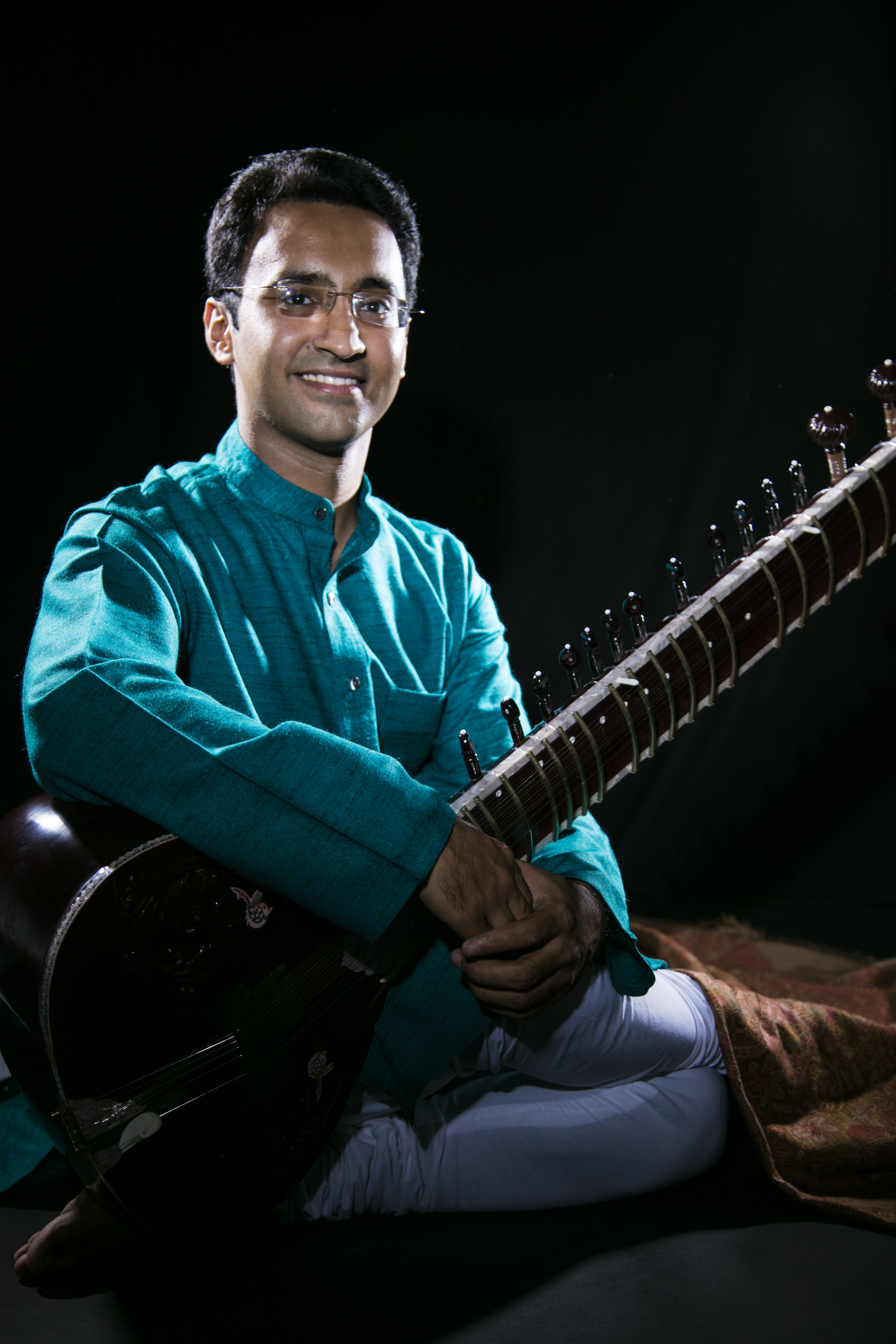

Background information
- Born: 16/09/1990; Delhi, India
- Genres: Hindustani classical music
- Occupation: Instrumentalist
- Instrument: Sitar
- Website: www.dhruvbedi.com

Dhruv Bedi (born c. 1990) is an Indian sitarist and musician associated with the Imdadkhani gharana of Hindustani classical music. He is a recipient of the Ustad Bismillah Khan Yuva Puraskar, a national award presented by the Sangeet Natak Akademi, for his contributions to Hindustani classical music.

== Early life and career ==
Dhruv Bedi was born into a family from Punjab with a tradition of Indian classical music. He began his training in Hindustani classical music under the guidance of his grandfather, Tara Chand Bedi, and his father, Jagdeep Singh Bedi, both of whom were sitar practitioners. He later trained under sitarist Pt. Budhaditya Mukherjee of the Imdadkhani (Etawah) gharana, where he continued his study of the sitar.

Bedi has performed at classical music concerts and cultural events in India and internationally. His performances are rooted in the Hindustani classical tradition and include presentations of various ragas and semi-classical compositions. His performances have included appearances before former President A. P. J. Abdul Kalam and former Prime Minister Manmohan Singh, including events associated with the World Economic Forum in Davos. He has also performed at BRICS-related events and for visiting dignitaries including Bangladesh Prime Minister Sheikh Hasina and Indian Prime Minister Narendra Modi. In addition to solo recitals, he has collaborated with accompanists and fellow musicians at music festivals and concert programmes.

== Awards and recognition ==
- 2018: Ustad Bismillah Khan Yuva Puraskar, presented by the Sangeet Natak Akademi, Ministry of Culture, Government of India.

== Discography ==
Month/Year of Release	Name	Genre	Artist(s)	Type	Label
April 2013	Strings of Wind	Indian Classical	Dhruv Bedi, Ritesh Prasanna & Zuheb Ahemad	Album	Dhruv Bedi
October 2019	Vaishnava Jana To	Indian Classical/Devotional	Dhruv Bedi	Single	Dhruv Bedi
June 2020	Atma Bomb	Indian Fusion	Dhruv Bedi & Ravishankar Collective	Album	Ravishankar Collective
September 2020	Vapourize	World Music	Dhruv Bedi & Parikrama Band	Single	Parikrama.inc
January 2021	Raag Shree	Indian Classical	Dhruv Bedi	Single	Dhruv Bedi
January 2021	Quest	World Music	Dhruv Bedi, Antariksh & Marty Friedman	Single	Antariksh
March 2021	Hori	Folk Fusion	Dhruv Bedi	Single	Dhruv Bedi
March 2021	Live At NCPA	Indian Classical	Dhruv Bedi	Album	Dhruv Bedi
March 2021	Raag Kedar	Indian Classical	Dhruv Bedi	Single	Dhruv Bedi
October 2021	Raag Nand	Indian Classical	Dhruv Bedi	Single	Dhruv Bedi
December 2021	Khamaj Tappa	Indian Classical	Dhruv Bedi	Single	Dhruv Bedi
April 2023	Raag Puriya	Indian Classical	Dhruv Bedi	Single	Dhruv Bedi
November 2023	Raag Kamod	Indian Classical	Dhruv Bedi	Single	Dhruv Bedi
December 2023	Healing Hues	Music for Healing, Yoga and Meditation	Dhruv Bedi	Album	Dhruv Bedi
December 2023	Live in Delhi - Raag Shudh Kalyan & Raag Kafi Tappa	Indian Classical	Dhruv Bedi	Album	Dhruv Bedi
March 2025	Raag Marwa	Indian Classical	Dhruv Bedi & Zuheb Ahemad Khan	Album	Dhruv Bedi
March 2025	Avartan	Indian Classical	Dhruv Bedi & Ut. Akram Khan	Album	Dhruv Bedi
April 2026	Healing Music for Yoga and Meditation	Indian Classical Healing Music	Dhruv Bedi	Album	Dhruv Bedi
