= Shujaat Khan =

Sitar player and musician from India

Shujaat Husain Khan
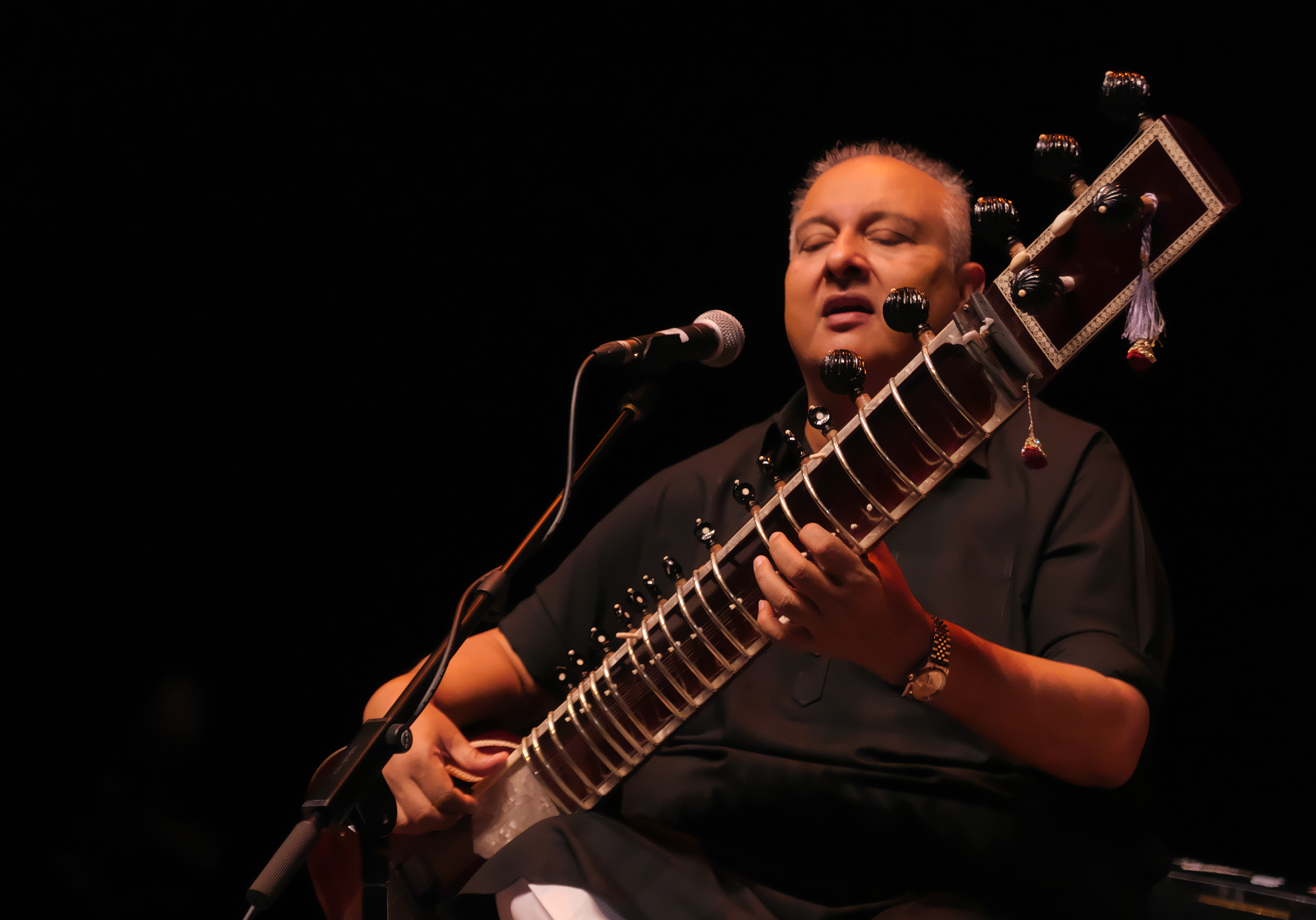
- Shujaat Khan performing in 2025

Background information
- Born: 19 May 1960 (age 66); Kolkata, West Bengal, India
- Genre: Hindustani classical music
- Occupations: composer, musician, Sitar player
- Instrument: sitar
- Years active: 1966 – present
- Website: shujaatkhan.com

Shujaat Husain Khan (born 19 May 1960) is a North Indian musician and sitar player.

He belongs to the Imdadkhani gharana, also known as the Etawah gharana school of music.

He has recorded over 100 albums and was nominated for a Grammy Award for Best World Music Album for his work with the band Ghazal with Iranian musician Kayhan Kalhor. He also sings frequently. His style of sitar playing, known as 'gayaki ang', is imitative of the subtleties of the human voice.

== Early life ==
Born in Kolkata in 1960, Shujaat Khan is the son of sitar player Ustad Vilayat Khan and Monisha Hazra. Shujaat Khan's musical career began at the age of three when he began practicing on a specially made small sitar. By the age of six, he began formal performances. He was influenced by great artists such as Ustaad Ustaad Amir Khan, Pandit Bhimsen Joshi, Vidushi Kishori Amonkar and many more.

His grandfather, Ustad Enayat Khan; his great-grandfather, Ustad Imdad Khan; and his great-great-grandfather, Ustad Sahebdad Khan were musicians and torchbearers of the Etawah gharana with its roots from Naugaon from Uttar Pradesh, India. His forefathers lived in Saharanpur, Agra, Etawah, Varanasi, Indore, Kolkata, Gouripur (now in Bangladesh), Delhi, Lucknow, Mumbai, Shimla and Dehradun. He has a brother, sitarist Hidayat Khan and two sisters Sufi singer, Zila Khan and Yaman Khan. Shujaat Khan is married to Parveen Khan and their son Azaan also is a music composer.

== Performing career ==
Shujaat Husain Khan gave his first concert at the age of 6 at Jehangir Art Gallery, Mumbai. Shujaat Hussain Khan has performed at numerous music festivals in India and has traveled around the world performing in Asia, Africa, North America and Europe. This includes Sawai Gandharva Sangeet Mahotsav, Pandit Jitendra Abhisheki Sangeet Samaroha, Maitra Mahotsav. Shujaat Khan appeared in a program called Classical Studio under the Saregama label.

His approach to rhythm is largely intuitive, fresh and spontaneous, always astonishing his audiences like his father, Vilayat Khan. He is also known for his exceptional voice, which he uses for singing folk songs, including the album Lajo Lajo (1995), as well as poetry, as in Hazaron Khwahishen.

Shujaat Khan was featured in the concerts celebrating India's 60th anniversary of independence in 2007, and performed at the Carnegie Hall, New York City with the Iranian musician Kayhan Kalhor Paramount Theater, Seattle, and Meyers Symphony Theater, Dallas. In a special performance, he also played at the United Nations in the Assembly Hall, Geneva.

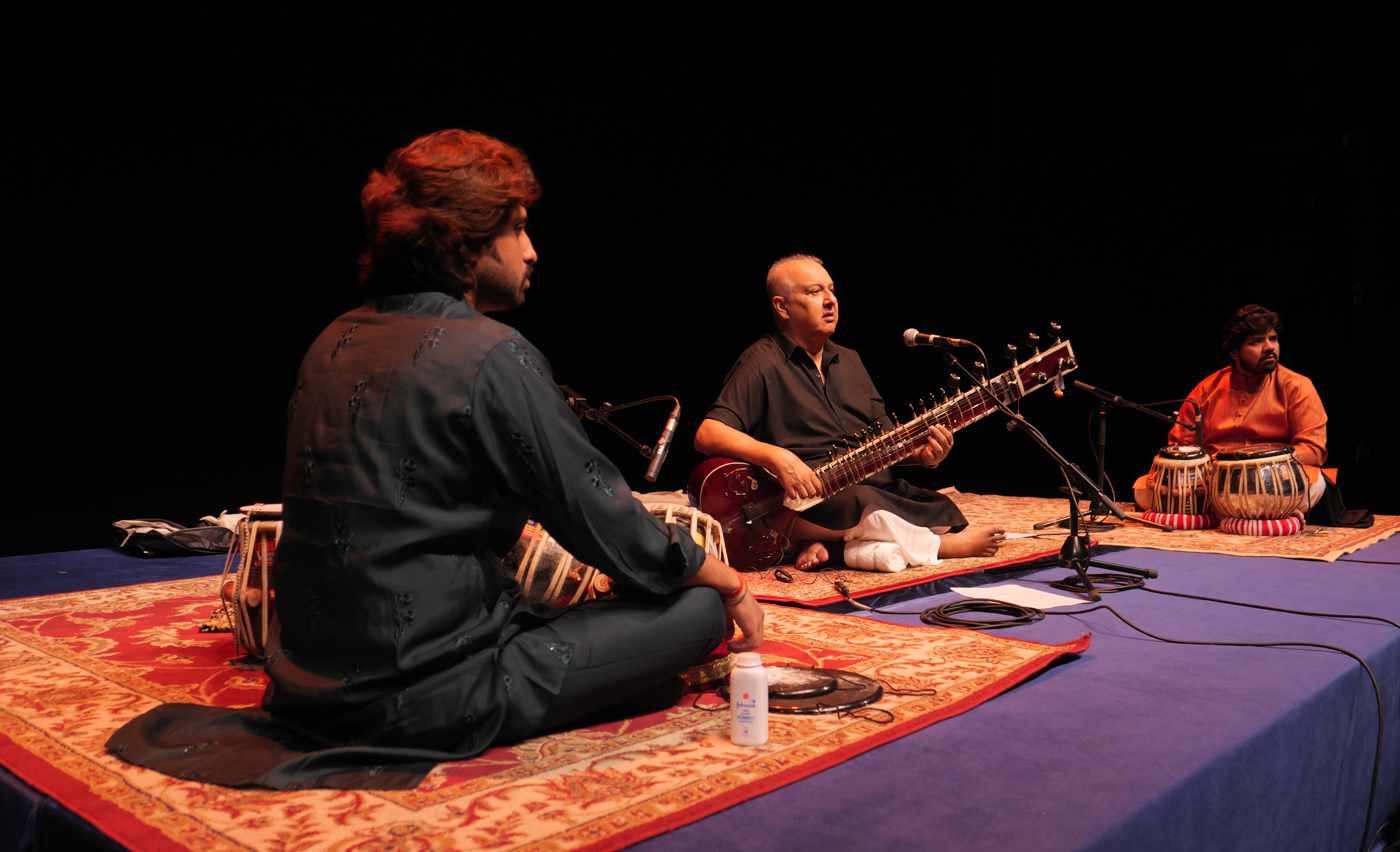
Shujaat Khan with tabla players Shariq Mustafa (L) and Zuheb Ahmed Khan (R)

His appearances include performance at the Royal Albert Hall in London, Royce Hall in Los Angeles and Congress Hall in Berlin. In the summer of 1999, he was the featured soloist with the Edmonton Symphony Orchestra in Canada. His collaboration with different genres of music is evidenced by the Indo-Persian venture, Ghazal. Their album, The Rain, was nominated for a Grammy award in 2004.

In January 2000, the Boston Herald listed Shujaat Khan, along with luminaries like Seiji Ozawa and Luciano Pavarotti among the top 25 upcoming cultural events for the year.

He has been invited as visiting faculty at the Dartington School of Music in England, the University of Washington in Seattle, and at UCLA, Los Angeles.

He has also done concerts with artists such as Karsh Kale to 'Jugalbandi' with Hindustani vocalist Ustad Rashid Khan. One of the collaborations of the year 2009-2010 is Melange. Featuring Tim Ries on the saxophone, Kevin Hays on the piano, Karsh Kale on percussion, Katayoun Goudarzi on vocals, Ustaad Shujaat Khan on sitar, Karl Peters on bass and Yogesh Samsi on tabla, Melange (band) has toured extensively across India.

Ustad Shujaat Khan has recently tied up with Inroom Records, a Mumbai-based experimental / fusion label and artist management company, to handle his collaborative work.

He collaborated in 2014 on Persian traditional music album Beyond Any Form.

== Discography ==
Shujaat Khan has over 100 musical releases on a variety of international labels; and a video called Khandan.

- Lajo lajo (Folk and Sufi music album, 1995)
- Waiting for Love (Shujaat Khan album) (1999)
- Shams (2008) Shujaat Khan (Sitar), Katayoun Goudarzi (Vocal) collaboration
- Delbar (2009) Shujaat Khan (Sitar), Katayoun Goudarzi (Vocal) collaboration
- Ruby (2015) Shujaat Husain Khan (Sitar), Katayoun Goudarzi (Vocal), Ajay Prasanna (Flute), Abhiman Kaushal (Tabla), Ahsan Ali (Sarangi), Prabhat Mukherjee (Santoor), Amjad Khan (Percussion)
- Spring (2013) Shujaat Husain Khan (Sitar & vocal), Katayoun Goudarzi (Vocal), Ajay Prasanna (Flute), Abhiman Kaushal (Tabla)
- Dawning (2013) Katayoun Goudarzi (vocal), Kevin Hays (piano), Shujaat Husain Khan (sitar, vocal), Abhiman Kaushal (tabla) & Tim Ries (tenor & soprano saxophones, bass clarinet, Hungarian folk flute)

== Performances ==
- In the year 2020 he performed at upper Meherabad on the eve of Meher Baba's 50th Amrtithi 2020.

== See also ==
- Sitar
- Imdadkhani gharana
- Ustad Vilayat Khan
