= Mujibar Rahaman =

Indian filmmaker and producer

Mujibar Rahman মুজিবর রহমান
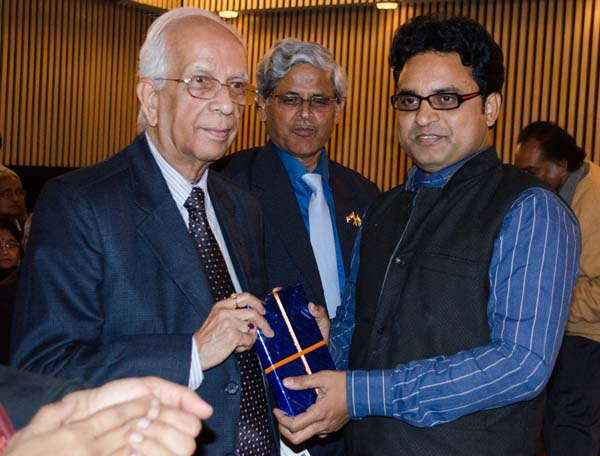
- Keshari Nath Tripathi (left) with Mujibar Rahaman during the release of a documentary on Acharya Prafulla Chandra Ray in February 2015
- Born: 25 May 1973 (age 53); Murshidabad, West Bengal
- Occupations: Filmmaker, producer
- Years active: 2003 - present
- Notable work: Images Unbound – The Life and Times of Rabindranath Tagore

Mujibar Rahman (Bengali: মুজিবর রহমান; born 25 May 1973) is a documentary filmmaker and film producer based in Kolkata, West Bengal. He made a full-length documentary on Nobel Laureate Rabindranath Tagore entitled Rabindranath Thakur – Jeevan O Samay (Bengali version); Images Unbound – The Life and Times of Rabindranath Tagore (English version). His other works include biographical documentaries on Rokeya Sakhawat Hussain, Munshi Premchand and films Sansodhan, Bhangoner Pore.

== Early life and career ==
Mujibar Rahman born in a village in Murshidabad. After completing high school, Mujibar went to Kolkata. He graduated from Calcutta University in 1995 before doing a Film Appreciation Course at the West Bengal Film Centre, Nandan.

In 1998, Mujibar went to Mumbai. He considers the years between 1998 and 2003 as his "Learning Phase". During his ‘Learning Phase’, Mujibar, by and by graduated to working as an Assistant Director for a Hindi Daily, Nyay for DD Metro which was produced by Nimbus Television, Mumbai followed by yet another Hindi daily Kanyadaan for Sony TV which was produced by Balaji Telefilms, Mumbai. He was also the Assistant Director for a Hindi Weekly Serial, Kadam for Sahara TV which was produced by Disha Production, Mumbai. Mujibar returned to Kolkata in 2003 and began his second phase in the City of Joy.

== Filmography ==
Mujibar Rahman has directed full-length and short-length documentaries over the years. Full-length documentaries directed by Mujibar include:

- Rokeya, – Aloker Dooti, produced by Kolkata Municipal Corporation.
- Munshi Premchand, Kalam Ke Sipahi, produced by Munshi Premchand Birth Centenary Committee.
- Rabindranath Thakur – Jeevan O Samay (Bengali version).;
- Images Unbound – The Life and Times of Rabindranath Tagore (English version).

Both the films on Tagore are produced by Cosmos Media & Communications, Kolkata.

=== Short-length documentaries ===
Mujibar has also directed a large number of short-length documentary films dedicated to the legends of Indian Classical Music. The list includes films on:

- Ustad Allahrakha (Tabla)
- Ustad Vilayat Khan (Sitar)
- Pandit Kishan Maharaj ( Tabla)
- Ustad Nisar Hussain Khan (Vocal)
- Pandit Jnan Prakash Ghosh (Tabla)
- Ustad Hafiz Ali Khan ( Sarod)
- Pandit Bishmadev Chattapadhya (Vocal)
- Gaan Tapasvini Mogubhai Kurdikar (Vocal)
- Pandit Sankha Chatterjee (Tabla)
- Ustad Ali Akbar Khan (Sarod)
- Pt. Bhimsen Joshi (Vocal)
- Pt. Vijay Kumar Kichlu (Vocal)

=== Short Films on institutions & organisations ===
- CRIJAF, produced by Central Research Institute of Jute and allied Fibers, Govt. of India.
- INK, produced by Institute of Neuro Sciences, Kolkata.
- PAN PANIO, produced by Guidance Group and Jadavpur University.
- Swapnapath, produced by Guidance Group.
- Green India Clean India, produced by Sun Plant Group of Companies.
- IOS, produced by Indo Occidental Symbiosis, Mumbai.
- Dishari, produced by WBMDFC, Birbhum Zilla Parishad.
- Naba Disha, produced by WBMDFC, Government of West Bengal.
- Choker Aloy, produced by Java Social trust, Malda.

== TV serials ==
Besides making documentaries, Mujibar has also written screenplays for TV serials and has also directed various TV programmes including:

- Written screenplay for a Bengali TV Serial, Bideshi Bodhu, for Zee Bangla.
- Prepared a special 90 minutes programme on Mahalaya – Mahalayer Mahalogne for Akash Bangla.
- A special programme of Eid-ul-Filtar – Eid Milaner Katha for Tara News.

Mujibar has also written and directed two films:

- Sansodhan.
- Bhangoner Pore.

=== Short biographical films ===
Mujibar is also credited to have directed short biographical films on the following noted personalities:

- Shree Santosh Kumar Das ( Social Activist and Educationalist).
- Shree Nandalal Maity (Mathematician).
- Anwara Chowdhury ( Social Activist and Educationalist).
- Shree Panchanan Parui ( Social Activist and Educationalist).
- Md. Sohrab ( Social Activist and Educationalist).
- Shree Bijay Bandopadhay ( Historian and Economist).
- Munshi Abul Kaseem ( Social Activist and Educationalist).
- Shree Tusher Kanjilal ( Social Activist and Educationalist).
- Shri Sunanda Sannyal ( Social Activist and Educationalist).
- Shri Chittaranjan Dasgupta (Historian and Educationalist).
- Agoonpakhi, a short film on noted lyricist, composer and singer Nachiketa.
- Ami Sei Meye, a short film on noted elocutionist Bratati Bandyopadhyay.
- Dukhumianar Golpo, a short film on rebel poet Kazi Nazrul Islam.

=== Memberships ===
- Film Writers Association, Mumbai. Membership Number – F- 7246
- Ritwik Memorial Library, Nandan, West Bengal Film Center.
- Ritwik Cine Society, Kolkata.
- Jt. Secretary, Neo Film Foundation of Bengal.
- Secretary, Oriental Media Forum.
