= Kashinath Mukherjee =

- Born: 8 January 1925
- Origin: Kolkata, India
- Died: 28 October 2011 (aged 86)
- Genres: Indian classical music
- Instrument: Sitar

Kashinath Mukherjee (8 January 1925 - 28 October 2011) was a Hindustani classical musician and sitar player of Etawah Gharana.

== Early life ==
Kashinath Mukherjee was born in Kolkata into an aristocratic family having a rich cultural heritage. His father Shital Chandra Mukherjee was a scientist specialized in chemistry, as well as a learned dhrupad singer. He is younger brother of film director Hrishikesh Mukherjee. His family consists of academics. Inspired by elder brother Hrishikesh Mukherjee (who became a film director later), he started to play sitar before starting to learn formally. His younger brother is Dwarkanath Mukherjee, a screenplay writer for many Bollywood films. Later he learned sitar from Srinivas Nag (a disciple of Ustad Enayet Khan) for twelve years. After the death of Srinivas Nag, he was under the tutelage of Ustad Vilayat Khan, one of the greatest sitarists. During this period he kept away from public appearances, as directed by his Ustad (master). His close association with legends like Ustad Bade Ghulam Ali Khan, Ustad Amir Khan, and Ustad Keramat Ullah Khan informed his musical views. Due to his inclination towards Amir Khan's singing, he learned from Amir Khan until Khan's death.

Mukherjee has participated in concerts in India and abroad. He is the recipient of the ITC Sangeet Samman award among others.

Ramprapanna Bhattacharya and Abhik Mukherjee are among his most prominent disciples.
