= Abhik Mukherjee =

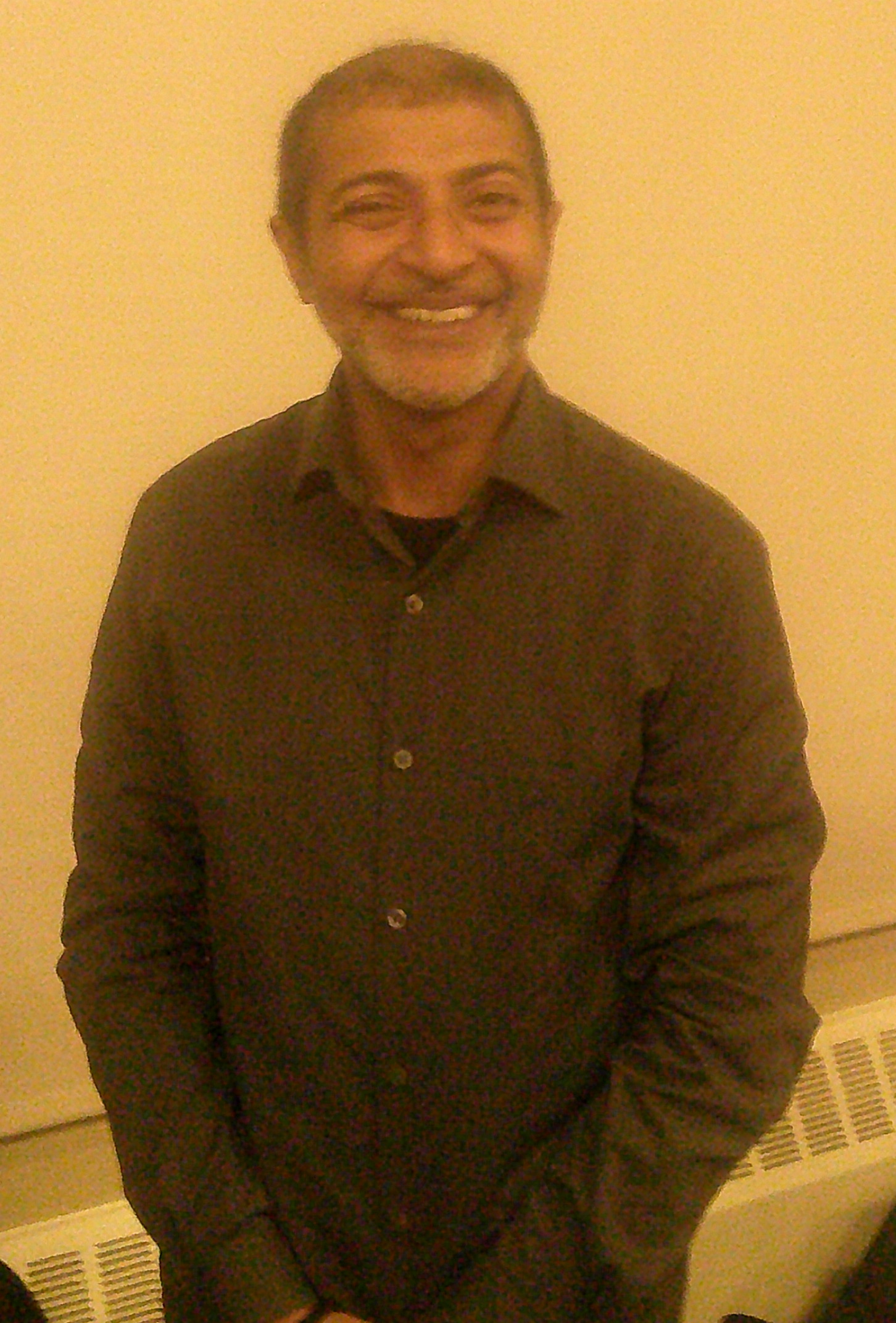
Mukherjee in 2026

Abhik Mukherjee is an Indian classical sitar player from the Etawah gharana.

He received his musical training from Arvind Parikh and Kashinath Mukherjee, themselves disciples of Vilayat Khan.

Mukherjee began his sitar training at the age of six in Kolkata, India. He received a gold medal from Rabindra Bharati University in Kolkata as well as a scholarship from the Ministry of Culture, India. He has performed and given workshops in India, the United States, Singapore, Taiwan, Switzerland, Germany, Italy, Suriname, and Argentina. Mukherjee performed at the inauguration ceremony for the Martin Luther King Jr. Memorial in Washington, D.C. Mukherjee is an active member of Brooklyn Raga Massive, an Indian classical music organization based in New York City.
