= Wahid Khan =

Indian musician

- Born: 1895; Etawah, Uttar Pradesh, India
- Died: Calcutta, India
- Occupations: Sitar & Surbahar player
- Awards: Sangeet Natak Akademi Award by the President of India in 1960

Wahid Khan (born 1895 – died ?) was an Indian surbahar and sitar player. He was the son of Imdad Khan and belonged to the Imdadkhani gharana or Etawah gharana of classical music.

== Early life ==
Wahid Khan was born in 1895 at Etawah, Uttar Pradesh. He was quite young when his father, Imdad Khan, moved to Kolkata from Etawah with his family. In Kolkata, the family lived in the house of the connoisseur Taraprasad Ghosh, where Imdad Khan trained his sons, Wahid Khan and Enayat Khan, in sitar and surbahar. Wahid Khan specialised in the surbahar while Enayat Khan specialized in the sitar.

Wahid Khan, at a very young age, was first initiated into Dhrupad, Khayal, and Thumri and then trained extensively on the sitar and surbahar by his father Imdad Khan for many years.

== Performing career ==
Imdad Khan, later, moved out of Kolkata to settle in Indore as the court-musician of the Maharaja Holkar of Indore. His sons Enayat Khan and Wahid Khan accompanied him to Indore. There, Imdad Khan died in 1920, following which Enayat Khan left Indore and returned to Kolkata, while Wahid Khan was appointed the court musician of the Indore court, where he lived for 18 years on a very high salary. Wahid Khan also served the Patiala court for three years as a court musician. He was also the court musician of the Nizam of Hyderabad.

Wahid Khan was a regular performer at All India Radio. He also performed all over India and received numerous awards and medals from the famous institutions of Tikamgarh, Rewa, Baroda, Mysore, and Dhaulpur.

Wahid Khan also appeared in filmmaker Satyajit Ray’s international award-winning film Jalsaghar (The Music Room, 1958), where he performed on the surbahar in one of the scenes.

== Personal life ==
Wahid Khan is the paternal uncle of noted sitar player Vilayat Khan and the surbahar player Imrat Khan. His grandson is Shahid Parvez, another noted sitar player. His brother Enayat Khan was also a noted sitar and a surbahar player.

== Awards ==
- Felicitated by the Governor of Bombay.
- First instrumentalist to receive the coveted President's Award (now Sangeet Natak Akademi Award) in 1960.

== Discography ==
Released 78rpm recordings:

- Khamaj (Vilambit Gat-toda) on the Sitar
- Pilu (Drut Gat) on the Sitar
- Bhimpalasi (Alap, Jod-Jhala) on the Surbahar
