= Wajahat Khan =

Indian musician, sarod player and composer (born 1960)

- Born: 11 May 1964 (age 62)
- Origin: Calcutta, India
- Occupation: Indian Classical musician
- Instrument: Sarod
- Years active: 1977 – present
- Labels: Nimbus Records, Navras Records, Sony India, Hyperion Records, Koch Schwann, Koch International, Audiorec Classics
- Website: wajahatkhan.com

Wajahat Khan (also known as Vajahat Khan; IAST: Wajāhat Khān, Hindi: वजाहत ख़ान, Bengali: ওয়াজাহাত খান, Urdu: خان وجاہت,) is an Indian sarod player and composer who has earned international acclaim since 1977.

He is the third son and disciple of sitar and surbahar player Imrat Khan, the nephew of sitar player Vilayat Khan, and a member of the Khan family, a multi-generational musical lineage that established the Imdadkhani Gharana.

== Early life ==
He was born in on 11th May 1960 in Calcutta, India and now divides his time between London and India.

== Career ==
Wajahat Khan started his training in singing, sitar and surbahar from the age of 3, and his professional career in music as a child prodigy singer touring the world at a young age, including a performance on BBC Television in 1977. In his early teens, he decided to specialize in sarod, marking an interesting departure from his family's traditional instruments of sitar and surbahar.

== International concerts ==
He has performed extensively around the world, touring in the Indian sub-continent, UK, Europe, Scandinavia, USA, former USSR, Africa, Middle-East, Japan and the Far-East. His performances at prestigious venues and festivals include the Kremlin in Moscow, the Acropolis of Athens, the Smithsonian Institution in Washington D.C., Symphony Space in New York, Suntory Hall in Tokyo, Playhouse Theatre in Durban, the Glastonbury Festival and the Royal Albert Hall for the BBC Proms Festival in the UK.

Whilst mainly focussing on performing traditional Indian classical music, he has also ventured into crossover as a distinguished composer, having written pioneering works for Indian as well as Western instruments and ensembles, including three sarod concertos for symphony and chamber orchestras and quintets for sarod and string quartets. In 1991 he wrote and performed his first sarod concerto in Germany and has since performed with renowned international orchestras and ensembles such as the London Sinfonietta and Halle Symphony Orchestra (UK), Cape Philharmonic and KwaZulu Natal Symphony Orchestra (South Africa) and the Singapore Symphony Orchestra. In 1997, he composed for and recorded his first quartet for sarod and string quartet with the Medici String Quartet and has since performed with leading quartets such as the Carducci String Quartet, Ciurlionis String Quartet, and the Allegri String Quartet. He has toured internationally on several occasions with his Wajahat Khan World Music Ensemble, which includes the renowned flamenco/jazz guitarist Eduardo Niebla.

His collaborations also include the British award-winning rock band Kula Shaker, Japanese Shakuhachi maestro Yoshikazu Iwamoto and Indian shehnai player Ali Ahmad Khan, with whom he recorded the first ever sarod and shehnai duet. In 1997, on the occasion of the 50th year of Independence of India. Wajahat Khan also created for the first time in history, a unique ensemble of soloists, consisting solely of all the traditional instruments and percussion that are at the forefront of North Indian classical music scene today – the Wajahat Khan Indian Chamber Orchestra. This was premiered to great acclaim at the Queen Elizabeth Hall in London and subsequent performances have included Huddersfield Contemporary Music Festival (UK). In 2008, he premiered his third sarod concerto to a standing ovation with the Halle Symphony Orchestra for the 150th year celebration of the Halle, at the prestigious Bridgewater Hall in Manchester and also composed, performed and toured another unique opera 'Queens of Govan' with the Scottish Opera.

Wajahat Khan also teaches and lectures internationally and has given concerts and workshop courses at eminent institutions, such as the University of Florida, University of Maryland, Utica University, Amherst College, Washington University in St Louis and Augustana College in the USA; the University of Malaysia in Kuala Lumpur; the Birmingham Conservatoire, Manchester and Brighton Universities, Yehudi Menuhin School of Music, Trinity College of Music and Morley College in the UK.

In London, he is the Founder Director of his own Academy of World Music, and has been Artist in Residence at the Middlesex University and SOAS, University of London, where he is also working on a book about Indian music. He performs and gives lecture demonstrations at various educational institutions of Spicmacay throughout India. He has given illustrated talks on television and radio introducing and explaining Indian music, most notably presenting a highly acclaimed series of programmes for the BBC World Service.

== Style ==
Wajahat Khan's style for the sarod is known for innovation that brings fluidity and intricacy that was heavily influenced by his family and a range of world music collaborations over the years. Careful to preserve the ancient traditions, Khan has also adapted the four-string technique of the surbahar to the sarod, adding new dimensions to the instrument. Adding a fifth melody string for the base, he uses seven pegs on the head of his instrument, instead of the conventional six or eight pegs used by other contemporary masters. His style on the sarod and virtuoso technique interweaves a wide spectrum of dhrupad, khayāl and thumri (vocal) forms with the sarod instrumental repertoires, providing a distinct sound and style.

== Discography ==
His CDs include:

- Nocturne: Late Evening Raga of Romantic Mood (2003)
- Indian Raags for Sarod, Tabla and Tanpura (2001)
- Rag Yaman Kalyan/Rag Gaoti(1996)
- Raag Desh/Shivranjani (2000)
- Raag Alaiya Bilawal (1987)
- Raag Desh (2002)
- Maru Behag/Dhun
- Tilak Kamod/Pilu
- Jhinjhoti/Pilu
- Brindabani Sarang
- The Quest: Khamboji/Khammaj
