= Sitar in jazz =

The history of the sitar in jazz, that is the fusion of the sounds of Indian classical music with Western jazz, dates back from the late-1950s or early-1960s when musicians trained in Indian classical music such as Ravi Shankar started collaborating with jazz musicians such as Tony Scott and Bud Shank. Later jazz recordings containing sitar music include albums by Miles Davis, Alice Coltrane, Yusef Lateef, Joe Harriott (in collaboration with composer John Mayer), and Ornette Coleman.

== Early uses ==
Although music based around the sitar would later spread from jazz to more popular music via The Beatles, the sitar became more widely known in the western world mainly through the work of Indian musicians such as Pandit Ravi Shankar, beginning in the late 1950s. From there it was taken up by jazz musicians and would later become a youth phenomenon in the mid-1960s after Beatle George Harrison took lessons from Pandit Ravi Shankar, and played sitar on several songs.

The first recorded collaboration between Indian and Jazz musicians occurred in 1961 with Ravi Shankar and a group led by the West Coast American saxophonist/flutist Bud Shank. Their album entitled Improvisations only features one track, "Improvisations on the theme music from Pather Panchali," in which Ravi Shankar and the Western musicians play together. The track is remarkable for little else; it is simply Western film music with the sitar playing the melody. However, this session, and that of film composer Shankar Jaikishan (1968), were connected the film industry, for Indian film music surely contributes the most considerable corpus of music that combines Indian and Western musics.

However, both Ravi Shankar and Ananda Shankar are important figures with regard to Jazz because it was primarily through their music that John Coltrane and others became aware of Indian music. Tony Scott recorded a track entitled "Portrait of Ravi" on his Dedications album, as early as 1957.

Coltrane met Shankar in 1965 after a long period of mutual admiration and letter writing (Thomas 1975:199). Coltrane's name is inextricably linked to the emergence of modal Jazz in 1958 on Miles Davis' album Milestones and it is believed that modal Jazz was inspired by Indian music. Indian influence is an important issue in the later music of Coltrane such as the album Kulu Sé Mama (1965) and also of musicians such as Yusef Lateef and Ornette Coleman.

== Notable sitar players in jazz music ==
- Khalil Balakrishna
- Ashwin Batish
- Nishat Khan
- Deobrat Mishra
- Collin Walcott
- Hindol Deb

== See also ==
- Indo jazz
