= Debu Chaudhuri =

Indian musician (1935–2021)

Pandit Devabrata (Debu) Chaudhuri
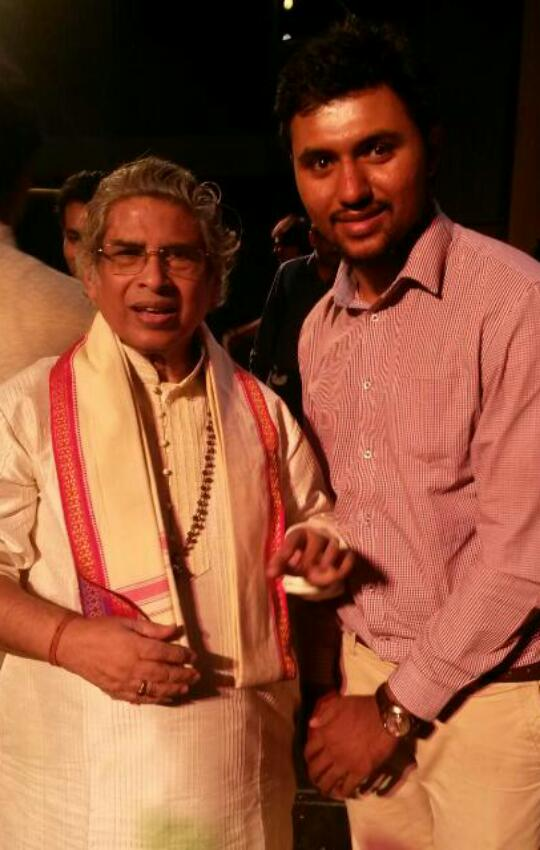
- Debu Chaudhuri (left)
- Born: Devabrata Chaudhuri; 30 May 1935; Mymensingh, Bangladesh
- Died: 1 May 2021 (aged 85); Delhi, India
- Education: Senia Gharana
- Known for: Music sitar
- Notable work: Published 6 Books, Composed 8 ragas
- Spouse: Manjushree Chaudhuri
- Awards: Padmabhushan, Padmashree
- Patrons: Ustad Mushtaq Ali Khan
- Website: www.ptdebuchaudhuri.com

Pandit Devabrata (Debu) Chaudhuri ((Bengali: পণ্ডিত দেবব্রত চৌধুরী); 30 May 1935 – 1 May 2021) was an Indian sitarist and teacher. He was conferred the Padmabhushan and Padma Shri awards. He was the writer of six books, composer of eight new ragas and numerous musical compositions. From 1963 he has appeared in numerous radio broadcasts, and he was a disciple of Mushtaq Ali Khan. He is considered a leading sitarist of Post War era. He is regarded as one of the leading proponents of Senia Style (or Gharana). He was the former Dean and Head, Faculty of Music, University of Delhi. His music is noted for its sweet singing ringing tone. He lived with his son, daughter-in law and niece at Chittaranjan Park, New Delhi.

== Birth ==
Pt. Chaudhuri was born in 1935 in Mymensingh (now in Bangladesh). He started playing the sitar from four years of age. His first broadcast was at the age of eighteen at the All India Radio in 1953.

== Death ==
Pt. Debu Chaudhuri died as a result of COVID-19 in Delhi, India, on 1 May 2021. He was admitted with COVID-19 along with dementia complications. He suffered a myocardial infarction (heart attack) around midnight and could not be revived. A few days after his death, his son Prateek Chaudhuri, a renowned sitar player, also died due to COVID-related complications.

== Training ==
He received his education in the University of Calcutta. He joined Delhi University as a reader from 1971 to 1982 and was the Dean and Head of Music Department from 1985 to 1988. He has served as a visiting professor at Maharishi International University (now called Maharishi University of Management), Iowa from 1991 to 1994. He received his training in sitar under late Panchu Gopal Datta and Ustad Mushtaq Ali Khan.

== Music ==
He started playing the sitar from four years of age. His first broadcast was at the age of eighteen at the All India Radio in 1953. He created 8 new Ragas viz. Bisweswari, Palas-Sarang, Anuranjani, Ashiqui Lalit, Swanandeswari, Kalyani Bilawal, Shivamanjari and Prabhati Manjari (in memory of his wife Manju). He has authored three books on Indian Music namely ‘Sitar and It's Techniques’, ‘Music of India’ and ‘On Indian Music’. He has recorded 24 CDs for 24 hours of the day in the United States.

== Style ==
He is considered a leading proponent of playing the repeated articulation of the pedal tone (also called the ‘’’Jod’’’) with the tonic pitch of the second string (also called the ‘’’Jodi’’’) string, by pulling the string across the fret that is allowed to die out before the basic alternation stroking is continued. He is considered one of the greatest sitar players of the era with Ustad Vilayat Khan, Ravi Shankar and Nikhil Banerjee. He is also unique in using the 17 fret sitar while most musicians use the 19 fret sitar.

== Contributions ==
=== UMAK ===
In April 2010 he started the UMAK (Ustad Mushtaq Ali Khan) Center for culture in memory of his ‘’guru’’ Ustad Mushtaq Ali Khan.
