= Jalsaghar =

- Directed by: Satyajit Ray
- Screenplay by: Satyajit Ray
- Based on: Jalsaghar a short story by Tarasankar Bandyopadhyay
- Produced by: Satyajit Ray
- Starring: Chhabi Biswas; Padma Devi; Pinaki Sengupta; Gangapada Basu; Tulsi Lahiri; Kali Sarkar
- Cinematography: Subrata Mitra
- Edited by: Dulal Dutta
- Music by: Vilayat Khan
- Production company: Aurora Film Corporation
- Distributed by: Contemporary Films (UK); Edward Harrison (US)
- Release dates: 10 October 1958 (India); April 1962 (UK); 15 October 1963 (US)
- Running time: 95 minutes
- Country: India
- Language: Bengali

Jalsaghar (Bengali: জলসাঘর Jalsāghar, lit. 'The Music Room') is a 1958 Indian Bengali drama film written and directed by Satyajit Ray, based on a popular short story by Bengali writer Tarasankar Bandyopadhyay, and starring Chhabi Biswas. The fourth of Ray's feature films, it was filmed at Nimtita Raajbari in Nimtita, Murshidabad district.

Despite an initially poor critical reception in India, the film went on to win the Presidential Award for Best Film in New Delhi, and it played a significant role in establishing Ray's international reputation as a director. It has since gained near-universal critical acclaim, and has come to be regarded by the cinema community as one of the greatest films of all time.

== Plot ==
In the early twentieth century, the fortunes of Biswambhar Roy, a Bengali zamindar, are in decline. He lives in a once-grand palace that is now occupied only by himself, his servant, and his steward. One day, the music from the coming-of-age ceremony of his nouveau-riche neighbour Mahim Ganguly's son prompts Biswambhar to reminisce about the ceremony once held for his own son, Khoka.

Four years ago, Biswambhar has always preferred staging lavish public concerts in his music room to managing his flood-damaged estates or adapting to the changing social order. With his finances depleted, he is forced to sell some of his and his wife Mahamaya's jewellery to finance Khoka's ceremony and preserve the family's prestige. The celebration featured, among other performances, a thumri singer.

While Mahamaya and Khoka are away visiting the former's ailing father, Mahim invites Biswambhar to a New Year's celebration at his newly built house, which is equipped with an electric generator. Unwilling to be surpassed by a commoner, Biswambhar claims that he has already arranged a celebration of his own at the palace and summons Mahamaya and Khoka home, sells more of their jewellery, and hastily secures a Khyal singer for the occasion.

The concert begins as Biswambhar waits for Mahamaya and Khoka. Increasingly anxious, Biswambhar leaves the music room during the performance to inquire about their whereabouts. He is subsequently informed that his family's boat had been caught in a cyclone and that both had been killed. Devastated, Biswambhar closes his music room and withdraws completely from the society, remaining within his palace for the next four years.

In the present, Mahim visits a visibly-aged Biswambhar, and invites him to the inaugural concert in his new music room, where a popular Kathak dancer is scheduled to perform. Biswambhar declines the invitation, but later hears the music from Mahim's celebration. Unable to resist the urge to reassert his former status, he orders his steward to repoen his music room and announces that he will hold a concert featuring the same dancer Mahim has hired.

Following the performance, Biswambhar takes satisfaction in asserting his superiority over Mahim by making the first offering to the dancer. The payment consumes almost all of his remaining wealth, but he remains indifferent to the cost. After the guests depart, he becomes intoxicated and delivers a rambling speech to his servant about the hereditary superiority of his aristocratic lineage over Mahim's newly acquired wealth.

As the candles in the palace chandelier gradually burn out, Biswambhar becomes frightened. His servant reassures him by opening the curtains and revealing that the dawn has broken. At the sound of his white horse neighing, Biswambhar mounts it and rides away. Drawn towards a beached boat on the floodplain, he continues riding until the horse suddenly rears up just before colliding with it, throwing him to the ground.

His servant and steward rush to his aid, but Biswambhar is already dead and his blood stains the floodplain.

== Cast ==
- Chhabi Biswas as Biswambhar Roy, a zamindar
- Gangapada Basu as Mahim Ganguly, a wealthy businessman and Biswambhar's neighbour
- Kali Sarkar as Ananta, Biswambhar's servant
- Padma Devi as Mahamaya Roy, Biswambhar's wife
- Tulsi Lahiri as Prasanna, Biswambhar's steward
- Pinaki Sen Gupta as Bireswar "Khoka" Roy, Biswambhar's son
- Begum Akhtar as Durga Bai, the thumri singer
- Roshan Kumari as Krishna Bai, the kathak dancer
- Wahid Khan as the surbahar player
- Salamat Ali Khan as Ujir Khan, the khyal singer
- Bismillah Khan as the shehnai player

== Production ==
Jalsaghar was based on a popular short story written by Bengali writer Tarasankar Bandyopadhyay. After the box office failure of Aparajito (1956), Ray desperately needed a hit, and he decided to make a film that both was based on a popular piece of literature and would incorporate Indian music. It was his first film to extensively incorporate classical Indian music and dancing. Production on the film began in May 1957.

While in pre-production, Ray and his crew had difficulty finding a suitable location for Biswambhar Roy's palace. By chance, they met a man who recommended the palace of the Choudhurys in Nimtita, known as the Nimtita Rajbari, and Ray decided to scout the location. To his surprise, the palace was not only perfect for the film, but he later learned that the main character of Bandopadhyay's short story was inspired by Upendra Narayan Choudhury, the uncle of the current owner.

According to Ray, "The Nimtita palace was perfect, except that the music room–it did have one, for Ganendra Narayan's uncle Upendra Narayan Choudhury had been a patron of music much like the nobleman in our story–was not impressive enough to serve as the setting for the sumptuous soirées that I had planned." Therefore, a more lavish music room was built at the Aurora Film Corporation studio in Maniktala, Kolkata. The studio has now been demolished.

Ray worked closely with composer Ustad Vilayat Khan on the film, although he was initially uncertain about the composer's musical choices, and had to convince Khan to compose more sombre pieces for the film.

== Reception ==
=== Box office ===
In 1981, the film was a box office success in France, selling 173,758 tickets—the most for an Indian film until Salaam Bombay! in 1988.

=== Critical reception ===
Although the film received mostly poor reviews in India, it received the Presidential Award for Best Film in New Delhi. Ray said in 1958 that he did not think it would be successful in foreign markets, but its gradual release in Europe and the US in the early 1960s was met with critical and financial success, and it helped to establish Ray's international reputation. In 1963, Bosley Crowther praised the "delicacy of direction ... [and] eloquence of Indian music and the aurora of mise en scène" in the film. Stanley Kauffmann's review from the same year, however, criticized the film, calling it "a deeply felt, extremely tedious film...the Indian music is simply uncongenial and tiresome to our ears." Two years later, Derek Malcolm called Jalsaghar Ray's "most perfect film." When it was released in Paris in 1981, the film was a surprise hit and led many French critics to adopt a new appreciation for Ray, which had not been common in France up to that time.

John Russell Taylor called Jalsaghar "one of Ray's most masterly films, exquisitely photographed and directed with a complete, unquestioning mastery of mood ... For those willing to place themselves under its hypnotic spell it offers pleasures of unique delicacy." Pauline Kael gave the film a rave review, calling it a "great, flawed, maddening film -- hard to take but probably impossible to forget. It's often crude and it's poorly constructed, but it's a great experience. Worrying over its faults is like worrying over whether King Lear is well constructed; it really doesn't matter". Roger Ebert hailed the film as "[Ray's] most evocative film, and he fills it with observant details."

John Coleman of the New Statesman compared Ray's work in the film to that of Jean Renoir, and Marie Seton said the film "challenged the whole convention of songs and dances in India cinema. Audiences...conditioned to the introduction of songs and dances as entertainment interludes and dramatic and romantic stresses, had never before been confronted with...classical singing and dancing as integral focal points of realistic sequences." Edward Guthmann of the San Francisco Chronicle described it as "A wonderful tale of pride and the fools it makes of men." German filmmaker Werner Herzog praised the film and Ray's use of music in it, saying: "it's of phenomenal beauty and Ray really knew how to use music and create a drama around music."

On the review aggregator website Rotten Tomatoes, 100% of 23 critics' reviews of the film are positive, with an average rating of 9.3/10.

=== Awards and accolades ===
At the 6th National Film Awards in 1959, the film won the All India Certificate of Merit for the Second Best Feature Film and an award for Best Feature Film in Bengali. At the 1st Moscow International Film Festival, it won the Best Music Award and was nominated for the Grand Pix for the Best Film in the festival.

Jalsaghar has been included on many retrospective "best films" lists. On French magazine Cahiers du cinéma's 2008 list of the "100 Best Films", it was ranked at #20. It was ranked at #27, #146, and #183 on the Sight and Sound "Greatest Films" lists compiled in 1992, 2002, and 2012, respectively. Film critic Derek Malcolm ranked the film at #56 on his list of the "Top 100 Movies" in 2001. The British Film Institute included it on their "360 Classics" list. The film was ranked at #7 (jointly with few other films) on Cinemaya's 1998 list of the "Greatest Asian Films". In 2015, the film ranked at #18 (jointly with few other films) on the "Asian Cinema 100" list compiled for the 20th Busan International Film Festival. The Daily Star ranked the film at #3 on its 2021 list of the greatest short story adaptations.

== Soundtrack ==
A soundtrack album of music from the film was released on CD in 1989 by Ocora–RadioFrance/Harmonia Mundi. The booklet accompanying the CD contains excerpts from an interview of Satyajit Ray conducted by Andrew Robinson in Calcutta in 1986.

== Home video ==
In 1993, Merchant Ivory Productions restored the film and Sony Pictures Classics released it theatrically in New York with five other Ray films. It was released on VHS in 1995.

In July 2011, an HD digitally restored version of the film was released on DVD and Blu-ray by The Criterion Collection.

== Preservation ==
The Academy Film Archive preserved Jalsaghar in 1996.
