= Prateek Chaudhuri =

Indian sitarist (1971–2021)

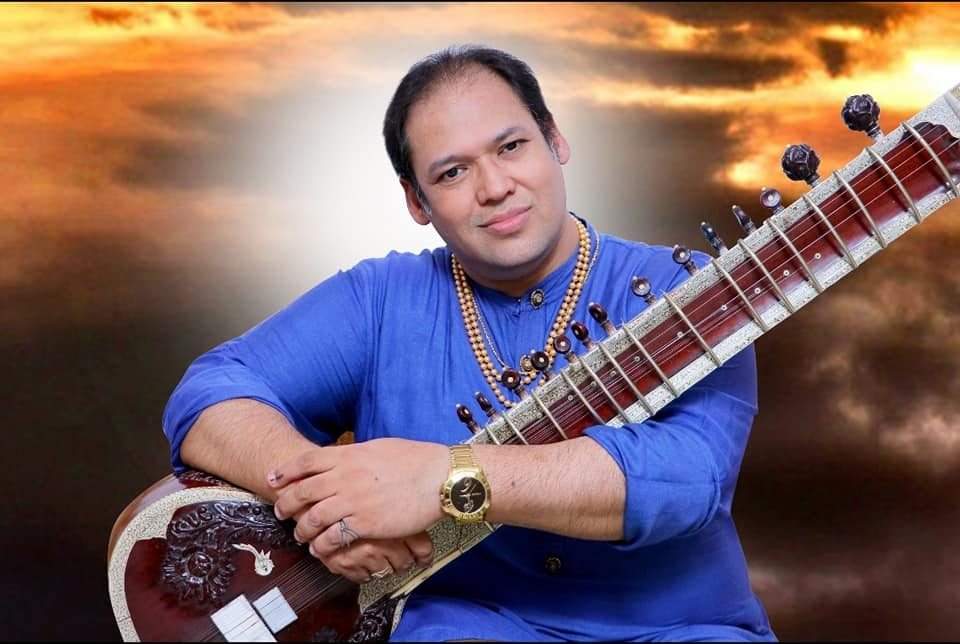

Background information
- Born: Prateek Chaudhuri; 7 September 1971
- Origin: Delhi, India
- Died: 6 May 2021 (aged 49) Delhi
- Genres: Indian Classical Music, Fusion
- Occupation: Musician
- Instrument: Sitar
- Label: Saregama
- Formerly of: Professor of Music, Faculty of Music, University of Delhi, India, Creative Music, Crossover Music, Ensembles, Fusion music concepts like "Sitar Ecstasy", "Sitars of India", "Soul of India -The Grand Fusion Orchestra"
- Website: prateekchaudhuri.com

Pandit Prateek Chaudhuri (7 September 1971 – 6 May 2021) son of Padmabhushan Pandit Debu Chaudhuri, was an eminent Indian classical sitarist of the Senia Gharana (school) and graded as a "Top Class" Artist of India by the Radio & National Television, Government of India. He was also associated as a Professor with the Faculty of Music, University of Delhi, India.

== Biography ==
He initiated his musical training under the tutelage of his father Pandit Debu Chaudhuri and also from his Father's Guru Ustad Mushtaq Ali Khan Sahab.

== Discography ==
1. Prateek Chaudhuri - Sitar,
2. Debu Chaudhuri And Prateek Chaudhuri Sitar

== Death ==
Prateek Chaudhuri died of COVID-19 on 6 May 2021, in Delhi. This took place only five days after his father had passed from a covid-related illness on May 1.

== Publications ==
- Plucked Instruments of Northern India with Special Reference to Sitar, ISBN 9788174531735, Sanjay Prakashan-2005, New Delhi, India
- Indian Music. ISBN 9788174530202, Sanjay Prakashan-2005, New Delhi, India.
