= Shafaatullah Khan =

Shafaatullah Khan is a tabla, sitar and surbahar player. He is the fourth son of Imrat Khan.
