= Imrat Khan =

Indian sitar and surbahar player (1935–2018)

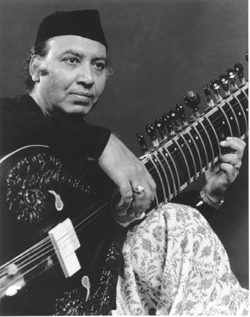
- Born: 17 November 1935; Calcutta, British India
- Died: 22 November 2018 (aged 83); St. Louis, Missouri, U.S.
- Occupations: Classical musician Sitar and Surbahar player
- Employer: Washington University in St. Louis
- Known for: An expert in playing surbahar
- Children: 5
- Awards: Sangeet Natak Akademi Award (1988); Padma Shri Award (2017)

Imrat Khan (17 November 1935 – 22 November 2018) was an Indian sitar and surbahar player and composer. He was the younger brother of sitar maestro Ustad Vilayat Khan.

== Training and early career ==
Imrat Khan was born in Calcutta on 17 November 1935 into a family of musicians tracing its roots back several generations to the court musicians of the Mughal rulers. The training in music has traditionally been passed down from father to son for nearly 400 years. He belonged to Etawah gharana also known as Imdadkhani gharana of classical musicians. Imrat Khan's father was Enayat Khan (1895–1938), recognised as a leading sitar and surbahar player of his time, as had been his grandfather, Imdad Khan (1848–1920), before him. Imrat Khan's father died when Imrat was a child, so he was raised by his mother, Bashiran Begum and her father, singer Bande Hassan Khan. In 1944, the family moved with Vilayat Khan, Imrat's older brother, to Bombay where both the brothers learned sitar-playing extensively from their uncle Wahid Khan. In 1952, Vilayat and Imrat moved in together in Calcutta. They performed together for many years. The two brothers were part of the first cultural delegation to the Soviet Union and Eastern Europe in 1956.

== Solo career and legacy ==
From 1961 onwards, Imrat Khan performed and recorded solo, playing both sitar and surbahar.

For decades, Imrat Khan recorded extensively on both his instruments. His full performance practice started with a surbahar alap in dhrupad ang (embellished with more romantic touches), followed by a shorter alap on the sitar leading into gat in traditional Imdadkhani style. (Sitar players such as Ravi Shankar and Nikhil Banerjee added bass strings to their sitars to achieve at least some of the surbahar's lower range on a single instrument).

Imrat Khan performed in Europe, the United States, the United Kingdom, Germany, China and Southeast Asia. He also performed at the Cannes Film Festival in 1970. He spent a portion of each year teaching classical Indian music and instructing sitar students at Washington University in St. Louis.

Imrat Khan's music has been featured in films made by noted filmmakers like Satyajit Ray and James Ivory.

"In 1971, he made musical history as the first Indian musician to play at London's Royal Albert Hall for the first-ever all-night performance of Indian classical music in the BBC Promenade Concert Series,"... says the Webster University website.

Imrat Khan was the senior performer of the Imdadkhani gharana, the school of sitar and surbahar performance named after his grandfather Imdad Khan.

== Death and legacy ==
Imrat Khan died on 22 November 2018 at age 83 due to a stroke in St. Louis, Missouri, United States, where he had been residing for over two decades before his death. He had been ill for some time before his death. Imrat Khan had five sons, Nishat Khan (sitar player), Irshad Khan (sitar player), Wajahat Khan (sarod player) and Shafaatullah Khan (tabla player), and Azmat Ali Khan, who were all trained by him.

== Awards and recognition ==
In 1988, Imrat Khan received a Sangeet Natak Akademi Award from the President of India.

In 2017, he was awarded the Padma Shri; however, he refused to accept the award stating "It is too little and came little too late"; which also sparked pandemonium among his students and members of the fraternity.

According to Outlook of India, "The noted musician was disappointed that the Indian government never recognized his contributions, even as several of his juniors and those who trained under him were presented with Padma awards".
