= Budhaditya Mukherjee =

Indian musician

Budhaditya Mukherjee बधादित्य मुखार्जी
- Born: 1955 (age 70–71); Durg, India
- Origin: India
- Genres: Indian classical music
- Occupations: Sitarist, Surbahar player
- Instruments: Surbahar, Sitar
- Years active: 1961–present
- Website: www.budhaditya.com
- Awards: Padma Bhushan (2019)

Pandit Budhaditya Mukherjee (Hindi: बूधादित्य मुखार्जी) is an Indian classical sitar and surbahar maestro of the Imdadkhani gharana (school), recognizable by his intricate vocalic playing complemented by spectacular high speed playing. He holds a unique distinction of being the ever first artist (not just musician) in history to perform in the House of Commons, London. Famously proclaimed the "sitar artist of the century" by veena great Balachander, he has performed in thousands of concerts since the 1970s in India, America, Australia, the UAE, and almost all of Europe.

== Early years ==
He was born in a musical family in Bhilai, India, in 1955, where his father was a senior official of the Bhilai Steel Plant. His father Acharya Pandit Bimalendu Mukherjee was trained in a plethora of instruments including the sitar, sarod, surbahar, rudra veena, sarangi, and vocal music. The senior Mukherjee often hosted veteran musicians at his home. In a video, Budhaditya recollects having sat on the lap of the legendary singer Ustad Bade Ghulam Ali Khan.

When Budhaditya was five years old, Bimalendu Mukherjee started teaching him on a small sitar and trained him for several decades thereafter.

In 1970, he won two national-level music competitions, and soon after was famously endorsed in glowing terms first by legendary film maker Satyajit Ray and then South Indian veena great Balachander, who proclaimed him "sitar artist of the century." In 1975, Budhaditya became a grade-A artist with All India Radio (he was promoted to top grade in 1986). During the 70s he became the first ever sitarist to play the tappa, a form of vocal music rolling with repeated high speed taans, and as of 2018, is probably the only sitarist to have effectively presented the tappa. He graduated as a First Class Metallurgical Engineer from National Institute of Technology, Raipur, while already a performing artist. During college, he is said to have written an exam right after arriving from the airport after performing. His son, Bijoyaditya, was born in 1984, and started training with Bimalendu and Budhaditya at the age of 5.

== Career ==
Mukherjee has toured the world extensively, giving concerts in over 25 countries, and from 1983 and 1995, respectively, taught from time to time at the Istituto Interculturale di Studi Musicali Comparati in Venice (alongside tabla player Sankha Chatterjee) and the Rotterdam Conservatory. He has also recorded widely, and at the age of 47, his discography spanned exactly 47 CDs, LPs and cassettes. In 1995, he started recording on the surbahar (bass sitar), first as a two-part series (Brilliance of Sound) for Beethoven Records in Kolkata (ragas Yaman and Marwa), then raga Komal re Asavari for RPG/His Master's Voice on Tribute to My Father, My Guru (STCS 850362). In 2003, he was the first Indian classical musician to have an enhanced CD published: Thumriyan (RCD-2224), on Bengali label Rhyme Records in Kansas, containing ragas Piloo and Bhairavi.

== Playing style ==
Pandit Budhaditya belongs to the Imdadkhani gharana, the name coined by himself, to credit Ustad Imdad Khan, who created the unique style and had named it after Etawah, where he lived.

His alap consists of deep and fine meends (gliding across notes) for which he pulls the string up to five and a half notes on a given fret. This technique is part of executing the gayaki or vocal style of playing, Budhaditya is particularly known for his high speed and clarity, which he says is a product of good control over the instrument, and should be played only for complementing the music. However, he has mentioned that in his early years, when he was still in search of a good sitar, he had to play high speed to make a career as a musician.

Budhaditya's typical concerts have been full length renditions of the ragas starting from developing through alap, jor, and then improvising over a composition with tabla accompaniment, before playing a high speed composition and jhala, and finishing with a shorter rendition in a different raga. He often develops the raga in the khayal gayaki ang, or the way a vocalist would do in the khayal style of singing.

Pt. Budhaditya Mukherjee's rendition of Ustad Imdad Khan Saheb's Razakhani gat in Raag Bihag:

== Quest for tone: 15 years of research ==
Pandit Mukherjee said that he changed 9 sitars in his initial 20 years of performing, while looking for the tone he wanted. By the mid 90s, he realized it was time for him to research the sitar making process to bring out the tone he had in his mind. There started his research along with a sitar maker, during which they damaged several sitars and built 2 sitars on opposing principles alongside a third one with favorable principles learned from the other two. After the 15 years of research, he can now produce the exact tone of his choice by modifying any sitar. Also, as seen in many videos beginning about the year 2000, his modifications include the permanent installation of Suzuki-style fine tuners for the chikari (drone) strings on his sitar.

== Surbahar ==
Rare sitar players play the surbahar, a bass version. Panditji has recorded relatively few albums on the surbahar and there a few more recordings available online, all of which show deep alaps, and a solid command on the instrument.

In a concert video, he has demonstrated tough taans (fast phrases) on the surbahar, involving pulling the string to over 5 notes at a time.

== Performances ==
Pandit Budhaditya Mukherjee has performed all over the world for more than five decades. Most recently, he performed twice at the Aga Khan Museum in Toronto, Canada in 2016 and 2019 for the Raag-Mala Music Society of Toronto.
