= Indo jazz =

Music genre

- Stylistic origins: Jazz, classical, Indian classical music, raga
- Cultural origins: Mid–1950s
- Typical instruments: Saxophone, guitar, bass, drums, violin, sitar, tabla and other Indian classical instrumentations

Other topics
- Folk jazz, jazz fusion, minimalism, serialism, twelve-tone technique

Indo jazz is a musical genre consisting of jazz, classical and Indian influences. Its structure and patterns are based on Indian music with typical jazz improvisation overlaid. While the term itself may be comparatively recent, the concept dates at least to the mid-1950s. Musicians including John Coltrane, Yusef Lateef and others reflect Indian influences.

The Mahavishnu Orchestra might be an early example of a jazz group with Indian influences as John McLaughlin at that time was a devotee of Sri Chinmoy. Others found the improvisational elements already in some Indian music to fit well with jazz. Although John Mayer and Joe Harriott are perhaps the most important influences in the movement. In addition Alice Coltrane is also known for relational work.

In the early 1970s, L. Subramaniam pioneered a new movement of Indo-jazz fusion, which he called "neo-fusion". It became very popular especially after the release of his albums such as Fantasy Without Limits (1979), Blossom (1981), Spanish Wave (1983), Conversations (1984), Indian Express (1985), and Mani and Co. (1986), in which he collaborated with musicians including Stephane Grappelli, George Duke, Stanley Clarke, Tony Williams, Herbie Hancock, Larry Coryell, Emil Richards among others.

In the late 70s, John McLaughlin started the band Shakti which combined jazz improvisation with Indian classical music. Another musician who made contributions to Indo-jazz is Vasant Rai who recorded two albums in the late 70s together with some of the members of the jazz fusion group Oregon.

In America, Broto Roy, tabla percussionist, began composing and recording his brand of "Raga-Jazz" with his debut CD American Raga (1998), which was taken aboard and played on the International Space Station when Dennis Tito (America's first space tourist) blasted off into space. EMI India released it in India. His second CD, Total Immersion – Live at the Kennedy Center, is only the second CD authorized for public release by the Kennedy Center (the first was by Pavarotti). His Quartet has released two CDs: Ancient Algorithms (2015) and All Barriers Fall (May 15, 2018).

== Ashwin Batish ==
One of the most innovative Indo-jazz experiences comes from Bombay native Ashwin Batish. Although classically trained in North Indian music by his father Pandit Shiv Dayal Batish, Ashwin's growing up in the West, first UK, then USA, gave him a unique insight into the world of Western music. His frequent sit-ins with jazz musicians and his exposure to western musicians such as his father's collaboration with George Harrison for the Beatles movie Help!, sparked in him a desire to stretch his classical music roots into the world of jazz and fusion. Ashwin has, for the past 35 years, been at the forefront of combining his classical sitar music with rock, pop and jazz. He has received critical acclaim from jazz and world music writers and audiences. His latest release, Jazz Is Where Is, is with his "fiery sitar power trio" (Nigel Wood, Ear To The Globe, Ireland).

Batish is presently on the faculty of the University of California, Santa Cruz where he teaches Indian music percussion theory and practice. Upon the invitation of the university, Ashwin will be teaching a five-week 2020 Summer intensive called Raga Jazz – an application of Indian music to Western Instruments.

== Specific to John Mayer ==
"Mayer is very definite about that distinction, as only someone could understand who grew up in Calcutta studying Indian music with Sanathan Mukherjee whilst simultaneously learning Western music with Melhi Mehta. 'Indian music is basically built around a linear technique', he says. 'There's no harmony in the Western sense, just one extended melodic line accompanied by a drone. The absence of harmony is compensated for by very complex rhythms. As I found out more about Western music, I realised that there are similarities with the techniques of serialism. In serialism you are dealing with an atonal sequence, and in ragas, the Indian scale system, you are dealing with a tonal sequence, but one which goes up one way and down another, what's called the aroha-avaroha. In most of the music we play in Indo-Jazz Fusions, the music is all scored. I don't believe in too much improvisation, and when there is space for improvising, this is done in a format which reminds the player of the notes of the raga. [...]' [...] Indo-Jazz Fusions is just such proof of the folly of labels. It isn't a question of the music being jazz, or Indian, or classical; it is a thoroughly satisfying blend of ingredients into something genuinely new, original and forward looking."

== See also ==
- Sitar in jazz
- Jazz in India
- Amancio D'Silva
