= Sankha Chatterjee =

Pandit Sankha Chatterjee
- Born: 1934; West Bengal, British India
- Died: 11 October 2024 (aged 89) Kolkata, India
- Genres: Indian classical music
- Occupation: Tabla musician
- Instrument: Tabla
- Website: Official site

Pandit Sankha Chatterjee (1934 – 11 October 2024) was an Indian tabla player. He studied under three traditional Tabla Gharana in strict Parampara tradition.

== Early life ==
Born into a musical family in Calcutta, India. His father was a doctor and musical enthusiast, exposing him to formal tuition early in life under Ustad Maseet Khan of the Farukhabad Gharana of Tabla. He studied under Ustad Maseet Khan, Sankha subsequently learnt from his son Ustad Keramatulla Khan and later from late tabla maestro Ustad Alla Rakha Khan of the Punjab Gharana.

== Career ==
Sankha Chatterjee's style is a blend of three leading Gharanas (schools), the Farukkabad, Punjab and Delhi Gharanas. He still performed and taught. He divided his time teaching in Berlin and India as his bases and held workshops across Europe and the United States. In 1984 he taught and performed at the Istituto Interculturale di Studi Musicali Comparati in Venice alongside sitar player Budhaditya Mukherjee.

His students are amongst some of the virtuosos of the younger generation of tabla players such as Gouri Shankar Karmakar, Subhojyoti Guha, Amit Chatterjee, Mihir Kundu, Hindole Majumdar, Friedemann Zintel and Federico Sanesi.

== Personal life and death ==
His elder daughter Vidushi Sangeeta BandyopadhyayGIMA nominated, is a leading classical vocalist of the Lucknow, Patiala and Indore Gharana of Indian classical sangeet.

Sankha Chatterjee died after a long illness in Kolkata, on 11 October 2024, at the age of 89.
