= Nishat Khan =

Indian musician (born 1960)

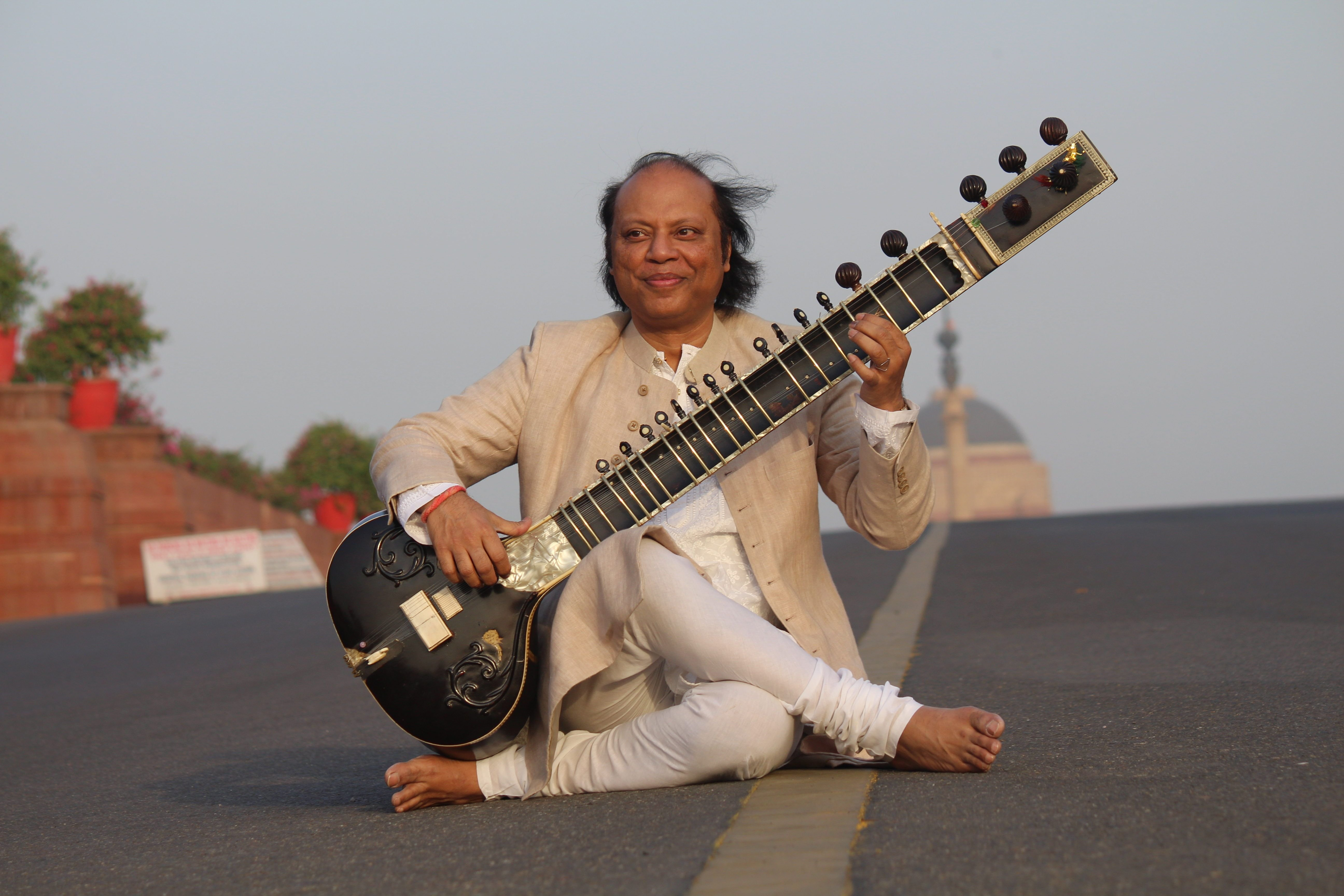
- Nishat Khan playing the Sitar
- Born: 25 October 1960 (age 65); Kolkata, West Bengal, India
- Occupations: Musician, Composer (Sitar player
- Years active: 1967 – Present
- Notable credit: Sitar player
- Relatives: Imrat Khan (father), Vilayat Khan (paternal uncle)
- Website: Official website - Archived

Nishat Khan (born 25 October 1960) is an Indian sitar player from a noted musical family and the foremost sitar virtuoso of his generation.

As a composer and music producer he has collaborated with some of the world's leading musicians such as Paco Peña, John McLaughlin, Philip Glass and Evelyn Glennie. His sitar concerto "Gate of the Moon" premiered with the BBC National Orchestra for the Proms at Royal Albert Hall in 2013.

== Early life ==
Nishat Khan was born on 25 October 1960 in Park Circus area of Kolkata, India in a house on a road named after his grandfather 'Ustad Enayat Khan Avenue'. He is the son of the sitar player Imrat Khan and the nephew of the legendary sitar player Vilayat Khan, who come from a leading family of instrumental music in the North Indian classical tradition, the Etawah gharana. With seven generations of sitar and surbahar (bass sitar) players, they directly influenced the evolution of sitar up to the present day.

Khan started playing the sitar at the age of 3 and gave his first concert at the age of 7 in Kolkata. Riyaaz (practice) was rigorous, often playing late into the night. Nishat's father was his guru and responsible for initiating his career, while his uncle Vilayat Khan was also a great influence and inspiration for him. He often attended concerts and would then give an analysis of what he heard upon returning home as a form of taleem (training).

== Career ==
Khan was the youngest performer ever to play on the All India Radio at the age of 13. Khan's first international concert was in 1977 in London, when he performed with his father, Imrat Khan, at the Queen Elizabeth Hall with two eminent musicians of the subcontinent sitting together in the front row, Ravi Shankar, and Salamat Ali Khan. He established an international career touring extensively and collaborating with artists such as John McLaughlin, Philip Glass, Paco Pena, Evelyn Glennie, Carlos Santana and Django Bates.

He first performed live in a duet with John McLaughlin in 1986 in Italy, who subsequently featured him on his 1993 album The Promise. With Philip Glass, he performed a comparative piece with opera and Nishat's raga Germany in 1993. In early 2000, Nishat began a unique collaboration with Paco Peña featuring Flamenco and sitar, with several tours in the UK and Europe as part of his group Spirit & Passion. With Evelyn Glennie, he performed at two concerts – one with BBC Scottish Symphony, a special piece Khan composed called Dancing with Seagulls. This was also performed in London at Wigmore Hall. Khan has also composed and recorded sitar and vocals on the rock song Love is the Answer by Weezer in 2009.

In 2025, Khan developed, composed, and performed Taj Mahal. This opera is a fusion of Indian classical music and Western classical music. Drawing on his deep heritage, virtuosic playing style, and expertise with transcendent orchestral scores, he set the legendary love story of Shah Jahan and Mumtaz Mahal on the backdrop of the Mughal Empire's political struggles and epic battles.

In multiple debut performances of Taj Mahal, Khan performed live on stage, his sitar serving as both narrative voice and musical bridge between traditions. The opera was acclaimed for its richly textured orchestration, which merged the complex flows of ragas and taals with sweeping symphonic melodies, transcendental choral writing, and arias that reflected both introspective lyricism and dramatic grandeur. Critics praised the work as “transforming and overwhelming” and “continuously absorbing,” noting its ability to unite two great classical traditions.

== Tours and performances ==
Khan has performed at major venues internationally, including Carnegie Hall, the Lincoln Center in New York, the Royal Albert Hall in London, and for Pope John Paul II at the Vatican. In 2004, he was invited to perform alongside Eric Clapton, Carlos Santana, Jeff Beck, John McLaughlin and others at the Crossroads Guitar Festival in Dallas. In 2007, he toured across India with violinist Vanessa Mae and performed at the Seagrams 100 Pipers Pure Music Show in August. In 2008, he toured Europe with his pioneering project, Spirit & Passion, featuring Flamenco guitar great Paco Pena, and later that year performed a solo concert at the BBC Proms. In 2009, he performed at Bovard Auditorium, Los Angeles. In October 2010, Nishat Khan worked on the concept of Mélange, a fusion-jazz show that features an eclectic mix of musicians from all around the world and performed at Tata Theatre, NCPA. He was also Invited to perform for the President of India at the Rashtrapati Bhavan.

The world premiere of Nishat Khan's Sitar Concerto no. 1 The Gate of the Moon featured as part of the BBC Proms programme at the Royal Albert Hall on 12 August 2013. The occasion was Khan's third appearance as a soloist at The Proms but was the first time showcasing one of his own orchestral compositions. The work integrates a sitar concerto with Western orchestration to tell the love story between the mystical "unknown traveller" (sitar) and the princess. David Atherton conducted the BBC National Orchestra of Wales in the performance of The Gate of the Moon, which was broadcast live on both BBC Radio 3 and the BBC Asian network. He gave the US premiere of the work in February 2018, with the Seattle Symphony.

In November that year, Khan indulged dance guru Pt Birju Maharaj in a duet or juggalbandi on stage at the opening of the 44th International Film Festival of India in Goa.

In 2015, he performed at the Théâtre de la Ville in Paris, the Kennedy Centre in Washington DC and at a concert at the Budapest Festival 2015. He has also collaborated with the artist-sculptor Anish Kapoor in London. In 2016, he visited Tehran with the Prime Minister's delegation and performed a solo concert at the Vahdat Hall. He also performed at the Barbican Hall in London the same year. In Delhi, on 18 November 2016, he performed with Jasraj and Kishori Amonkar. On 8 October 2017, he performed at the Merkin Concert Hall at the Kaufman Music Centre in Manhattan. He also opened the Sixth Edition of the Delhi Classical Music Festival in October 2017. He was also invited to perform at the prestigious US Ravinia Festival, UK Aldeburgh Festival, and the Virée Festival in Montréal, Canada.

== Versatility in music ==
Nishat Khan is known for his ability to combine his own musical heritage with different styles of music, such as Western classical, jazz, flamenco, and Gregorian chant. His album Meeting of Angels, created with the Gregorian chant group Ensemble Gilles Binchois, is a unique collaboration that gained international recognition. It was also performed at the Proms in 2008 with the BBC Singers and later toured around the world with well-known choirs.

He composed the music for the album Jaan Meri with singer Anuradha Palakurthi, of which the title track won 2019 Song of the Year, Independent Music Category Award at the Radio Mirchi Music Awards, the Indian equivalent of the Grammys.

== Films ==
In 2011, he composed his first Bollywood film score, Yeh Saali Zindagi, for the director Sudhir Mishra. In 2013, the Indian Government commissioned him to write a 70-minute orchestral score for the Indian silent film, A Throw of Dice. The work was commissioned especially for performance at the Centenary Film Festival, which celebrates 100 years of Indian cinema.

In addition he has composed music for Ismail Merchant’s Heat and Dust (1983) and Bernardo Bertolucci’s Little Buddha (1993).

== Press appearances and interviews ==
"Nishat Khan's new Sitar Concerto offered an altogether more meditative engagement with India. This sitar legend (just the latest in a dynasty of great musicians in his family) is a familiar face at the Proms, but he has never before appeared as both composer and soloist. The concerto itself follows in the footsteps of Ravi Shankar's concerto, marrying the textures and techniques of Indian classical music with the instrumentation and symphonic structure of western music." — Alexandra Coghlan, The Arts Desk, 13 August 2013

"Nishat Khan himself and the orchestra gave an exemplary account of the concerto. The charismatic presence of Khan on his podium dominated the whole performance and his interactions with the orchestra were fascinating, genuinely touching and exciting by turns." — Chris Garlick, Bachtrack, 14 August 2013

"Khan's playing emerged from and receded into the textures like the mysterious traveller, the sitar was meant to represent. Although his performance cohered exactly with the mood and tempo of the orchestra, it also embodied a sense of autonomy from external constraints, not least by the resonance of its sympathetic strings outlasting all other tones, and by the increasingly virtuosic strumming towards the end, compounding the impression of a source of dynamic energy whose origins are unfathomable." - Curtis Rogers, Classicalsource.com, August 2013

"The main event of the evening was the world premiere of Nishat Khan's The Gate of the Moon. Like Ravi Shankar before him, this Calcutta-born sitar player has been impelled to create a sitar concerto with Western orchestration: with amplification, the two elements can be brought to a sort of parity. Nishat Khan was invited to puff his piece beforehand and did so fulsomely, describing his instrument as 'the unknown traveler introducing a mystical and positive energy'." — Michael Church, The Independent, 13 August 2013

== Personal life ==
He has been touring continuously since the age of 17 and has resided in India, Italy, France, UK and the United States. He was an invited Visiting Professor of Ethnomusicology at the University of California, Los Angeles in 2003 and California State University at Long Beach in 2005. He has lectured at universities around the world, including College of DuPage, UMass Amherst, UC Santa Cruz, Princeton University, Kent State University, Dartington College of Arts in London, Hochschule der Kunste in Berlin and many other prestigious institutions. He has three brothers and one sister.

== Released Recordings ==
CD Title	Ragas	Record label	CD Ref	Year
Great Heritage Great Tradition	Malkauns; Jaijaivanti	His Master's Voice	EASD 1423	1984
Meeting of Angels	Mixed	Amiata	ARNR 1096	1996
Heart of Fire	Desh; Pilu; Maand	Navras	NRCD0209	
Indian Classical Masters	Bhimplasi; Tilak Kamod	Nimbus	NI 5233	1990
Sentimental Sitar	Chandini Kalyan; Jogkauns; Kalavati; Mishra bhairavi	T-Series		
Sitar	Pilu; Jhinjoti; Bihari	Saregama		
Raga Khan	Gawoti; Jogia	Amiata	ARNR 1997	1998
Mian Ki Malhar	Mian Ki Malhar; Dhanasri	Indian Archive	IAM CD 1024	1996
String Craft	Mixed	Victor Japan	Amazon ref: B00005GWAT	
Nishat Khan and Zakir Hussain	Yaman; Suha Sugrai; Bhairavi	His Master's Voice	ECSD 3134	1985
Nishat Khan Sitar	Behag; Bhatiyar	EMI	Amazon ref: B005389HJO	
Indian Classical Masters	Bhimplasi; Tilak Kamod	Nimbus	Amazon ref: B00000E08X	1990
Jhinjoti	Jhinjoti	His Master's Voice	EASD 1472	1990
Secret World	Bhairavi	Amiata	ARNR 2697	1997
Jaan Meri	Tribute to Bollywood Music	Juju Productions		March 23, 2019

== See also ==
- Sitar in jazz
