= Deobrat Mishra =

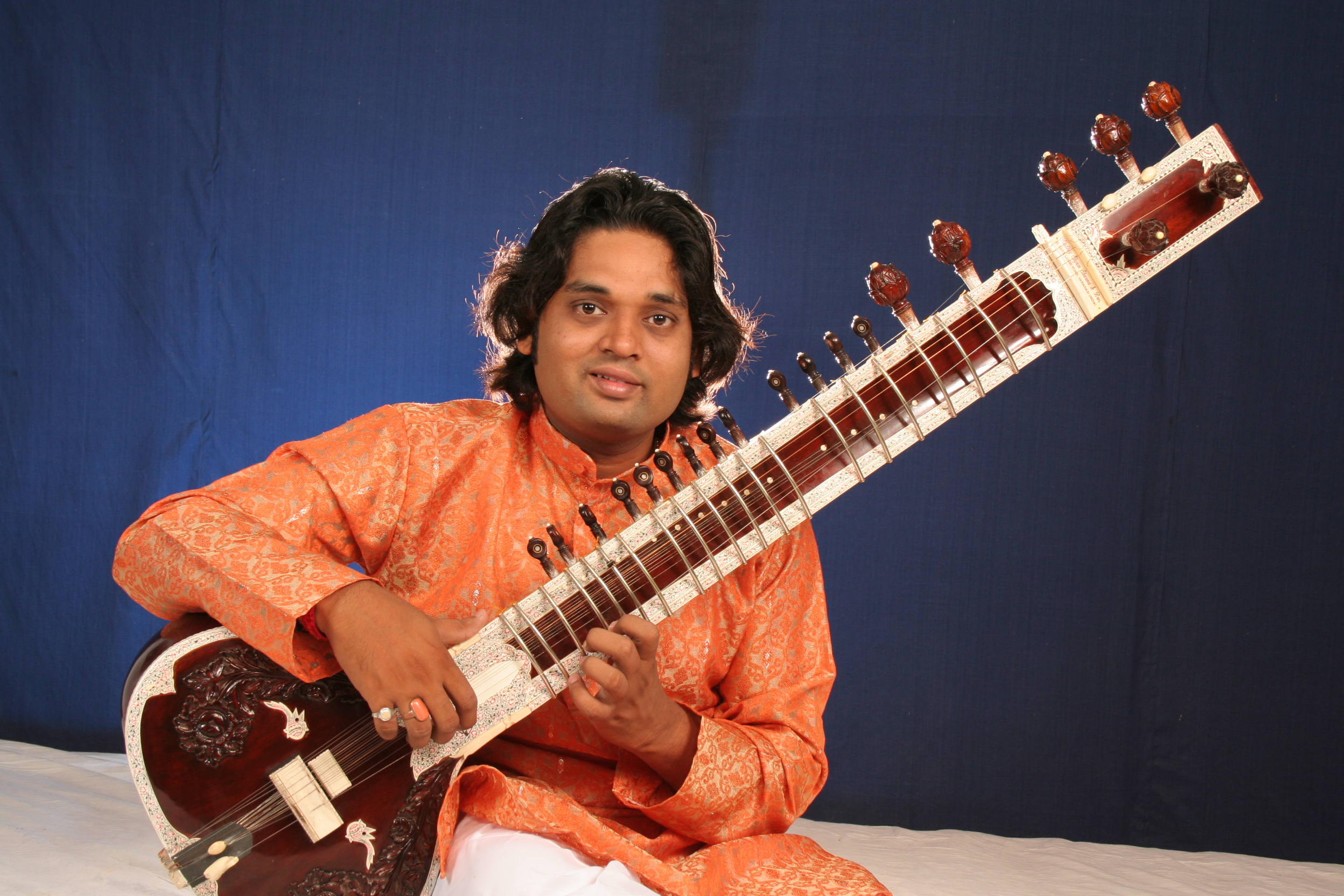
- Deobrat Mishra at his academy in 2007

Background information
- Born: 4 June 1976 (age 50); Varanasi, Uttar Pradesh, India
- Genres: Hindustani classical music
- Occupations: Sitarist, world music
- Instruments: Sitar & Surbahar
- Labels: T-Series, Soundings of the Planet
- Website: Official website Academy

Deobrat Mishra (born 4 June 1976) is an Indian sitarist. He is an exponent of the Benares Gharana school of Indian classical music. He plays Banarasi Thumri on sitar.

== Early life and education ==
Deobrat Mishra was born in Varanasi, India, to the sitar player Shivnath Mishra. He received a master's degree in sitar from the Prayag Sangit Samiti in Allahabad. He has travelled around the world, giving concerts and workshops at packed venues.

== Performances ==
Mishra has performed with:

- Roberto Olzer – piano (Italy)
- Roger Hanschel – saxophone (Germany)
- Leslie Mandoki – drums (Germany/Hungary)
- Al Di Meola – guitar (USA)
- Mike Stern – guitar (USA)
- Tony Carey – vocals (USA)
- Randy Brecker – trumpet (USA)
- Nick Van Eede – (England)
- Christian Burchard – (Germany)
- Marja Burchard – Germany

== Discography ==
- Soul of Benares (2013) – Bihaan Music
- India meets Europe (2012) – Relaxation 2000, Luxembourg
- Sitar Jugalbandi (2011) – Bihaan Music
- Sound of Meditation (2011) – Bihaan Music
- Gandharva Indoeuropean Music Ensemble (2009) – Amiata Records, Italy
- Milan (2009) – Bihaan Music
- Soul of Sitar (2007) – T-Series
- Emotions of Sitar (2007) – T-Series
- Sound of Sitar (2006) – T-Series
- Sitar Jugalbandi (2006) – T-Series
- Cororchestra del Piemonte (2005) – La Stampa, Italy
- Raga Cycle (2004) – Soundings of the planet, USA
- Trio Benares (2016) – Jazz Sick, Germany
