= Irshad Khan =

Canadian musician (born c. 1963)

Irshad Khan (born c. 1963) is an Indian classical surbahar and sitar player based in Canada. He is the second son of Imrat Khan and nephew of Vilayat Khan.

Irshad's international debut was at the Queen Elizabeth Hall in London, England, when he was only 13; he appeared there again on 30 October 2006 in a concert to celebrate the 70th birthday of his father Imrat. At 18, he made history by becoming the youngest soloist to perform at the Indian All Night concert at the Proms.

Irshad Khan is the founder/president of Universal Academy for Musicians, based in Mississauga and Mumbai.

== Albums ==
- The Magic of Twilight (2000)
