= Zila Khan =

Indian Sufi singer and actor

- Occupations: Musician, Performer of Sufi music and Actress
- Years active: 30
- Known for: Vocalist of Sufi music
- Relatives: Vilayat Khan (father) maestro sitar player Monisha (mother); Faizan Khan (son) - co-member of her musical group
- Awards: India's Prime Minister's Roll of honor award Ghalib Award for lliterary achievements
- Website: Official site

Zila Khan is an Indian Sufi & Bhakti music, Hindustani classical music singer and a Theatre and Film actress.

She sings Sufi, Bhakti, classical and semi-classical musical forms and is Ustad Vilayat Khan’s daughter. Her Gharana is called Imdadkhani gharana. Zila and her forefathers have five generations of recordings from the time recorded music started in the world. She has acted in Bajirao Mastani a film by Sanjay Leela Bhansali and also actively acts in theatrical plays like Gauhar. She is a playback singer for Bollywood films and advertisements. Zila stands for 'Freedom in Education and Gender Equality'. She is also a composer and a music director. Zila also produced and directed a documentary called 'Spirit To Soul' on her father Ustad Vilayat Khan. In her singing, she uses the poetry of Ghalib, Bulleh Shah, Baba Farid and Kabir, among others.

== Early life and career ==
Zila Khan was born to Ustad Vilayat Khan, the maestro sitar player, and was his formal disciple. She was named by her father on the raag Zila Kaafi of Amir Khusrau.

Zila Khan was empowered by her father from a young age. He taught her for fourteen to sixteen hours a day and she has mastered all his compositions. Zila Khan's musical heritage spans seven generations of Indian classical musicians and five generations of recorded music.

Zila Khan has performed in every major Indian and International Music Festival and venues such as:

- Lincoln Center for the Performing Arts, New York City
- John F. Kennedy Center for the Performing Arts, Washington, D.C.
- Symphony Space, Broadway, New York
- MTV Coke Studio, India
- MTV IGGY
- Trafalgar Square, London
- Royal Albert Hall, London
- Commonwealth Games in India (2010)

Zila Khan has command over various music styles such as Indian classical, semi-classical, Sufi, folk & Bhakti Sangeet. She sings in 8 different languages and has also sung 'Western Concertos' in English, Latin, Persian & Arabic. She sings in Urdu language, Punjabi language, Persian and Arabic. She has also performed at several Jazz Festivals with leading artists from an array of genres and cultures. In Sufi Music style, she performs with her vast range of qaul, qalbana, gul, and now is dedicating time for the revival of traditional Ghazal singing.

Music Therapy through Ustadgah Foundation Centre and Fortis Hospital, Zila Khan is a Music Therapist and Consultant. She started the first Music Therapy wing in India. The department is dedicated towards collecting and analyzing research data which will be used to treat certain ailments in patients and people all over the world who need supportive treatment or even for regular good health like Yoga. Acting in a lead role in a musical play – Gods, Graves & Grandmothers, Zila's role was that of the grandmother on which the play was based on. She sang 14 songs in various genres of Indian semi-classical, Bollywood, classical, folk and Sufi music in that musical play.

In 2004, the Ministry of External Affairs had asked Zila Khan to make a documentary on the life of her father, the legendary sitar maestro Ustad Vilayat Khan. It is called Spirit to Soul.

The documentary also shows a clipping of Ustad Vilayat Khan making Zila Khan his student and successor in a formal ceremony.

== Awards and recognition ==
Zila Khan is regularly invited to perform at President and Prime Ministerial level receptions on multiple occasions by the Indian Government. She has performed for former President APJ Abdul Kalam, President Pratibha Patil and also for former Prime Minister Manmohan Singh, who presented her with the prestigious 'Roll of Honor'.

She was also awarded the literary award named after the famous poet Ghalib called the Ghalib Award.

Being a representative of Indian heritage and culture, Zila is one of the select few artists who has been featured in the 'Incredible India' advertisement campaign for the Tourism Ministry of India. She is regularly invited to go on delegations abroad with the Indian Government; and is also an official member of the organizing committee of the Commonwealth Games.

Zila Khan is a dedicated composer and has selected many songs from Sufi and contemporary poets. She was featured in the multi-producers episode of Coke Studio @ MTV Season 2.

== Music school ==
Ustadgah Foundation was established in 2008 by Zila Khan. Its aim is to teach and groom under-privileged children who are musically talented. The foundation provides students with scholarships and helps build a musical base, vision and capability to earn their livelihood through music, and showcase India's culture and heritage nationally and internationally.

== Personal life ==
Zila Khan has a son Faizan Khan. Zila and Faizan roam the world together doing music concerts while simultaneously pursuing his academic studies. With Faizan's background and training first from his grandfather, Ustad Vilayat Khan, and then his mother Zila Khan, they have together created a music production called The Fez Project. The project showcases classical and Sufi music which is merged with more popular genres like electronic, acoustic, flamenco to promote, attract/involve and form a connection with the youth. They also tour through various universities to speak to young students about the project through lecture-demonstrations and concerts. It has currently been established as a digital property which aims to attract more of the youth to start listening to classical music.

Faizan is the only grandchild of Ustad Vilayat Khan who has learned sitar and vocal music from him and has been under his guidance and lived with him for 12 years until Ustad Vilayat Khan died in 2004.

On the topic of Ustad Vilayat Khan introducing 'gayaki ang on sitar or any instrument’, she is quoted as saying: "Oh! he created history, his style has changed the face of north Indian classical music forever". She also quoted Ustad Vilayat Khan as saying, "your music should be an eye-opener and pleasurable both for the connoisseurs and the layman".

== Discography ==
- Ishq Ki Nayee Bahar
- Zila – Classical and Semi-Classical renditions.
- 99.9FM – Bollywood Film
- Secrets of the Divine- in which Zila Khan has composed all the songs.
- The Realm of the Heart
- Sar Masti – A tribute to Amir Khusrau
- Zila The girl child – Hazrat Rabia Basri's Sufi'ism historical recording in musical form for the first time in music.
- Sing with Sufis
- Vasl (title song of drama ost)
- Tere Ishq mein (title song of Man o Salwa ost)
- Braveheart – A Tribute to Women
