= Arvind Parikh =

- Born: 19 October 1927 (age 98); Ahmedabad, India
- Genres: Hindustani classical music
- Instrument: sitar
- Years active: 1944–present

Arvind Parikh (born 19 October, 1927) is an Indian classical sitar player.

== Early life ==
Arvind was born in Ahmedabad into a Gujarati business family. His father Natverlalbhai was a textiles businessman, and his mother Chandrakalaben was a painter. His primary and secondary education continued in a nationalist school. In 1944, at the age of 17, he moved to Mumbai and started learning from sitar player Vilayat Khan. As per Khan's wish, Parikh attended Bombay University, along with the music education from Khan. Parikh enrolled in Elphinstone College, Bombay. His musical education continued uninterrupted for 60 years throughout his performing career, from 1944 until Khan's death in 2004.

== Music career ==
Arvind Parikh has been performing for over six decades. Associations with other musicians helped him in his research work. These musicians include B. R. Deodhar, Latafat Hussain Khan, Amir Khan, Niyaz Ahmad-Faiyaz Ahmad Khan, D. T. Joshi, and Radhika Mohan Maitra. He has performed in India and abroad. He has performed at music festivals in India and Europe, and has had concert tours in several parts of West Asia, Far East and Australia. Parikh is a regular performer on All India Radio. His daughter Purvi Parikh is also a classical vocalist. His wife was a disciple of Niyaz Ahmad - Faiyaz Ahmad Khan of Kirana gharana. Parikh has compiled compositions and ragas in "Sitar Guru" and "Bandish Parampara" published by Navras Records UK.

== Cultural ambassador ==
Parikh was the vice president of the International Music Council (UNESCO) during 1994-97 and is currently co-ordinator for the Indian sub-continent. He is the president of the Indian Musicological Society, chairman of the Western India chapter of ITC Sangeet Research Academy.

Arvind Parikh has been conducting Baithaks with top notch Classical Musicians covering vocalists and instrumentalists.

Baithaks have a unique format and style with an open but focused conversation with the artist to highlight aspects of classical music such gharana, methodology of teaching, and current context of Hindustani classical music.

Parikh conceived establishing a forum at which all segments of the music world could meet to discuss issues of common interests. Music forums are established in Mumbai, Chennai, Kolkata and Delhi. He is currently spearheading an association of 12 classical musicians, called All India Musicians’ Group (AIMG) - drawn from the Carnatic and Hindustani traditions (including Zakir Hussain, Hari Prasad Chaurasia, Shivkumar Sharma, Ravi Kiran, and Rajan-Sajan Mishra), to create greater support in government, industry and the media for Indian classical music.

== Industrialist ==
Parikh has handled the pursuits of business and music simultaneously. Parikh's business is a logistics provider in 51 Indian cities. Its latest joint venture with Deutsche Post and DHL as DHL Lemuir Logistics Pvt. Ltd. He is chairman of an Indian transportation organization and director of a travel and tourism company, and his family owned group owns a company for printing accessories.

== Personal life ==
Arvind was married to the classical singer Kishori Parikh (1929-2007). She was a student of prominent Kirana Gharana musicians Niaz Ahmed and Faiyaz Ahmad. The couple has a son, Snehal, and a daughter, Poorvi, a classical singer.

== Awards and recognition ==
Parikh has been awarded the Gaurav Puraskar for the year 1997-98 by the Gujarat State Sangeet Natak Academy. He has also been awarded the National Award by Sangeet Natak Akademi for Instrumental music (sitar) for the year 2003.

He was given India's third highest civilian award, the Padma Bhushan, in 2018.
