= Etawah gharana =

Classical music school in India

The Etawah gharana is a North Indian school of sitar and surbahar music and named after a small town close to Agra where Imdad Khan (1848–1920) lived. It is also known as Imdadkhani gharana in the honour of its founder, Imdad Khan.

== Imdad Khan family ==
Imdad Khan's family is a musical family from India. The family has its roots in Etawah on the outskirts of Agra before finally branching out to Calcutta with Enayat Khan and later to Hyderabad, Indore and Mumbai with Wahid Khan and Vilayat Khan.

The gharana's achievements include the development of the Surbahar, major structural changes to both the sitar and surbahar, and the creation and development of the instrumental style known as the gayaki ang (vocal style performed on sitar) by Vilayat Khan, and this style of sitar is now known as the Vilayatkhani sitar.

Living performers of the family include Shahid Parvez, Shujaat Khan, Nishat Khan, Irshad Khan, Wajahat Khan, Hidayat Khan, and Zila Khan, who is the first female performer of this gharana.

== Exponents of the gharana ==
- Imdad Khan
- Enayat Khan
- Wahid Khan
- Vilayat Khan
- Imrat Khan
- Rais Khan
- Shahid Parvez Khan
- Budhaditya Mukherjee
- Shujaat Khan
- Nishat Khan
- Irshad Khan
- Sameep Kulkarni
- Bimalendu Mukherjee
