= Enayat Khan =

Musician sitar player (1894-1938)

Ustad Enayat Khan
- Born: 1894; North-Western Provinces, British India
- Died: 1938 (aged 43); Calcutta
- Occupations: Sitar player, Classical music performer

Ustad Enayat Khan (Urdu: عنایت خان; (1894–1938) also known as Nath Singh was one of India's most influential sitar and surbahar players in the first decades of the 20th century. He was the father of Vilayat Khan, one of the top sitar players of the postwar period.

== Early life ==
Enayat Khan was born in 1894 in the North-Western Provinces, British India into a family of musicians. His father was the great sitar maestro Imdad Khan, who taught him the sitar and surbahar (bass sitar) in the family style, known as the Imdadkhani Gharana or Etawah Gharana (music school origin), named after a small village near Agra called Etawah. He married Bashiran Begum, daughter of khyal singer Bande Hussain.

== Performing career ==
He settled with his family in Calcutta, where, though he only lived to age 43, he did much pioneering work on the sitar. He developed the 'gayaki ang' further that his father Imdad Khan had taught him, in sitar playing. He gave a new dimension to the crafting and making of the sitar. For example, he standardized its physical dimensions and added the upper resonator gourd, which is very popular with today's players (though his own descendants have not been using it). His improvements in sitar-playing made the sitar much more popular among mass audiences.

"True, Vilayat Khan did not play the rapid-fire multi-stroke 'taan-toda' in which his father (Enayat Khan) excelled; but it can be conjectured with a fair amount of certainty that this was because he did not want to enter an area already developed to the hilt by Ustad Enayat Khan."

"No other instrumentalist in his time had such depth, mastery, knowledge, and the ability to organize and systemize the instrumental style."

In a place rapidly developing into an important North Indian centre of the arts, at a time when interest in national culture was strong, fueled by the struggle for independence, he brought sitar music out of its narrow connoisseur circles to new mass audiences. Nobel laureate Rabindranath Tagore was a musical collaborator and personal friend. Some of Enayat Khan's recordings have been released on CD, on the Great Gharanas: Imdadkhani compilation in RPG/EMI's Chairman's Choice series.

== Death ==
Enayat Khan died young at age 43 in 1938, with four children. His two sons, noted sitar player Vilayat Khan (1928-2004) and Imrat, were trained in the Imdadkhani gharana style by other members of his extended family. Vilayat learned the sitar and Imrat the surbahar; both were to become very famous classical musicians later.
