= Surbahar =

Plucked string instrument used in Indian classical music

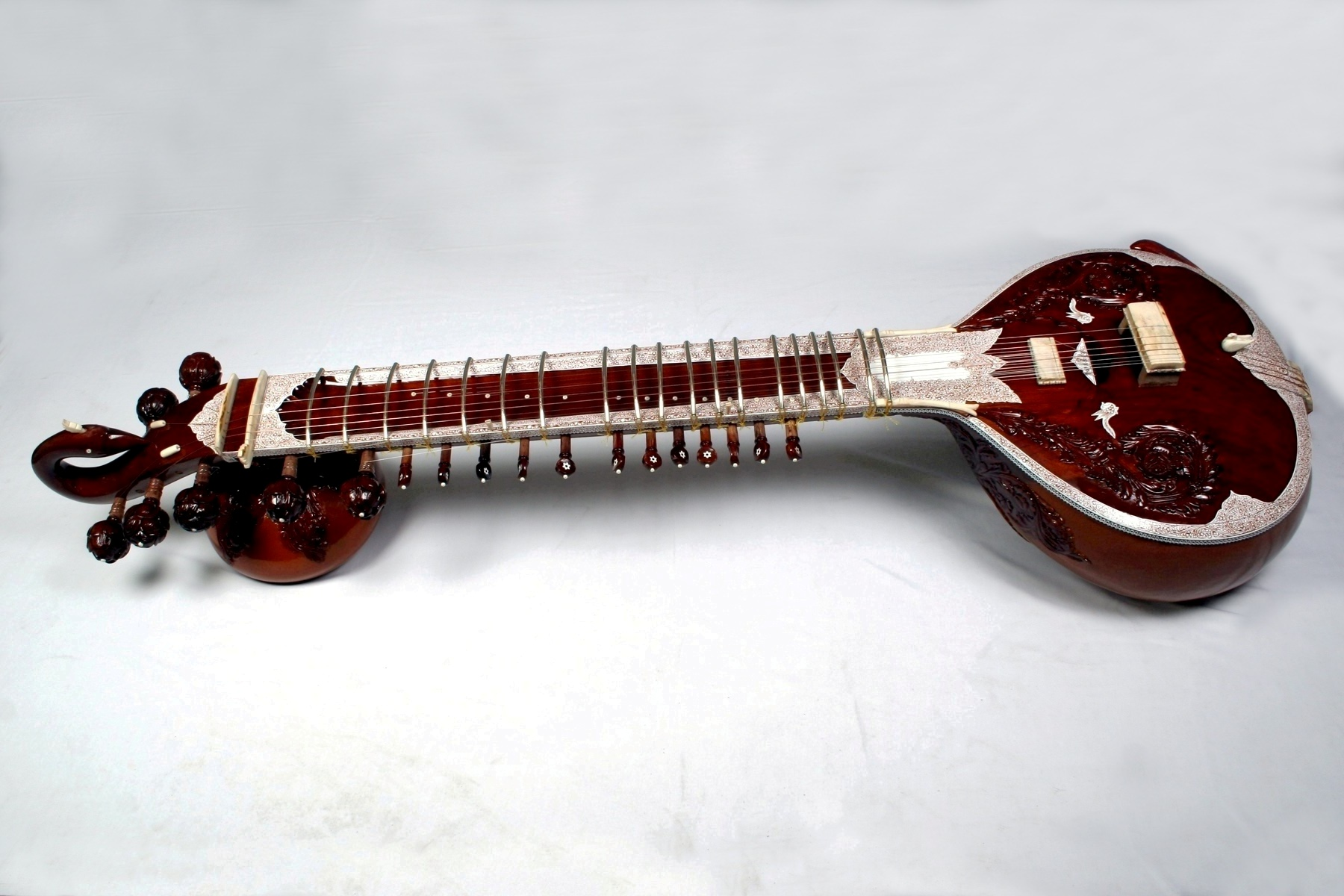
- Classification: Necked bowl lutes; String instruments

Related instruments
- Sitar; Rudra veena; Saraswati veena; Chitra veena; Vichitra veena; Sarod; Sursingar

Surbahar (Hindi pronunciation: [s̪urbəhɑːr]; transl. Springtime of Notes) sometimes known as bass sitar, is a plucked string instrument used in the Hindustani classical music of the Indian subcontinent. It is closely related to the sitar, but has a lower pitch. Depending on the instrument's size, it is usually pitched two to five whole steps below the standard sitar.

== Overview ==
The surbahar is over 130 cm (51 inches). It uses a dried gourd as a resonator, and has a neck with very wide frets, which allow a glissando or "meend" of as much as an octave on the same fret through the method of pulling. The neck is made out of toona, or mahogany wood. It has 3-4 rhythm strings (chikari), four playing strings (the broadest 1 mm), and 10 to 11 sympathetic strings. There are two bridges; the playable strings pass over the greater bridge, which is connected to the tabli with small legs, which are glued in place. The sympathetic strings pass over the smaller bridge which is directly glued on the tabli (soundboard). The bridges have a slightly curved upper surface parallel to the string that the strings touch when vibrating, which results in a buzzing sound known as jawari. The body of the instrument is similar to that of a sitar, in that it is made of a large dried gourd with a carved wood face on one side and joined to the neck by a carved wooden yoke or "gulu". It differs in that most surbahars have a gourd that is larger and tilted 90º so that the bottom of the gourd is to the back of the instrument, creating a shallower and rounder body for an enhanced bass response.

The instrumentalist plays the strings using a plectrum of bent steel wire, the mizrab, which is fixed on the index finger of the player's right hand. Three plectrums are used on the first three fingers to play the dhrupad style of alap, jor, and jhala on surbahar. In the dhrupad style, instead of performing the sitarkhani and masitkhani gats, the instrumentalist plays the slow dhrupad composition in accompaniment with pakhawaj.

Some researchers believe that surbahar was invented around 1825. At the time, the veena, which is considered a holy instrument associated with the goddess Saraswati, was only taught to descendants of veena players. The development of the surbahar was due in part to the desire to play in a lower range similar to that of the veena.

Surbahar was invented by Omrao Khan Beenkar and Ghulam Mohammad was his disciple. Omrao Khan Beenkar was the grandfather of Wazir Khan of Rampur. The invention is also attributed to Ustad Sahebdad Khan. Recent research shows that Lucknow-based sitarist Ustad Ghulam Mohammed may also have been the inventor. A similar kind of instrument, known as the Mahakachhapi Vina, is also known to exist during that period.

== Notable performers ==
- Annapurna Devi (1927 - 2018)
- Imdad Khan (1848 - 1920)
- Wahid Khan
- Enayat Khan (1894 - 1938)
- Imrat Khan (1935 - 2018)
- Mushtaq Ali Khan (1911 - 1989)
- Pushparaj Koshti (born 1950)
- Ashwin M. Dalvi (born 1977)
- Irshad Khan
- Budhaditya Mukherjee (born 1955)
- Manilal Nag (born 1939)
- Kushal Das (born 1959)
- Rajeev Janardan (born 1967)
- Suvir Misra
- Deobrat Mishra (born 1976)
- Babu Khan
- Rameshwar Pathak (1938 - 2010)

== See also ==
- Hindustani classical music
- Annapurna Devi
- Sitar
