= Vilayat Khan =

Indian musician

- Born: Vilayat Khan; 28 August 1928; Gouripur, Mymensingh, East Bengal
- Died: 13 March 2004 (aged 75); Mumbai, India
- Occupation: sitar player
- Years active: 1939 – 2004
- Awards: "Aftab-e-Sitar" (Sun of the Sitar) from the President of India "Bharat Sitar Samrat" by the Artistes Association of India; Silver Medal at the 1st Moscow International Film Festival in 1959

Vilayat Khan (28 August 1928 – 13 March 2004) was an Indian classical sitar player, considered by many to be the greatest sitarist of his age. Along with Imdad Khan, Enayat Khan, and Imrat Khan, he is credited with the creation and development of gayaki ang (a technique that emulates the vocal melisma of Hindustani classical music) on the sitar.

He recorded his first 78-RPM disc at the age of 8 and gave his last concert in 2004 at the age of 75. He composed the music for several films, including Jalsaghar (1958), The Guru (1969), and Kadambari (1976).

== Early life ==
Vilayat was born in Gouripur, Mymensingh in then East Bengal in British India and current Bangladesh. His father Enayat Khan was recognised as a leading sitar and surbahar (bass sitar) player of his time, as had been his grandfather, Imdad Khan, before him. He was taught in the family style, known as the Imdadkhani gharana by his father and other relatives. The Imdadkhani gharana is also called Etawah gharana, known after a small city close to Agra where Imdad Khan lived. This family represents the sixth generation of musicians that dates back to the Mughal Empire.

Enayat Khan died when Vilayat was only ten, and much of his education came from the rest of his family: his uncle, sitar and surbahar maestro Wahid Khan, his maternal grandfather, singer Bande Hassan Khan, and his mother, Bashiran Begum, who had studied the practice procedure of his forefathers. His maternal uncle, Zinde Hussain, looked after his riyaz (practice). As a boy, Vilayat wanted to be a singer, but his mother, herself from a family of vocalists, felt he had a strong responsibility to bear the family torch as a sitar maestro.

== Performing career ==
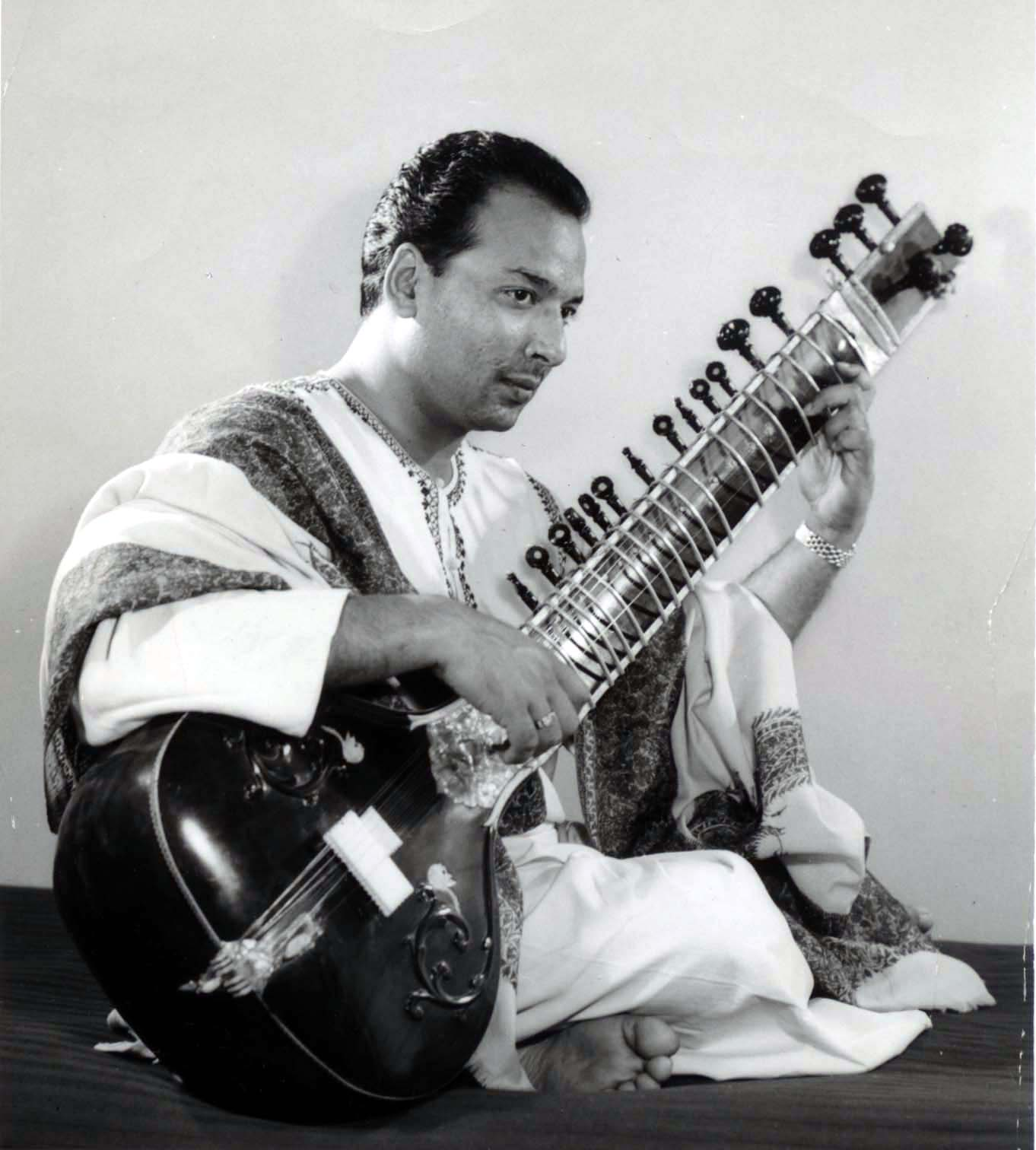
Vilayat Khan in 1954

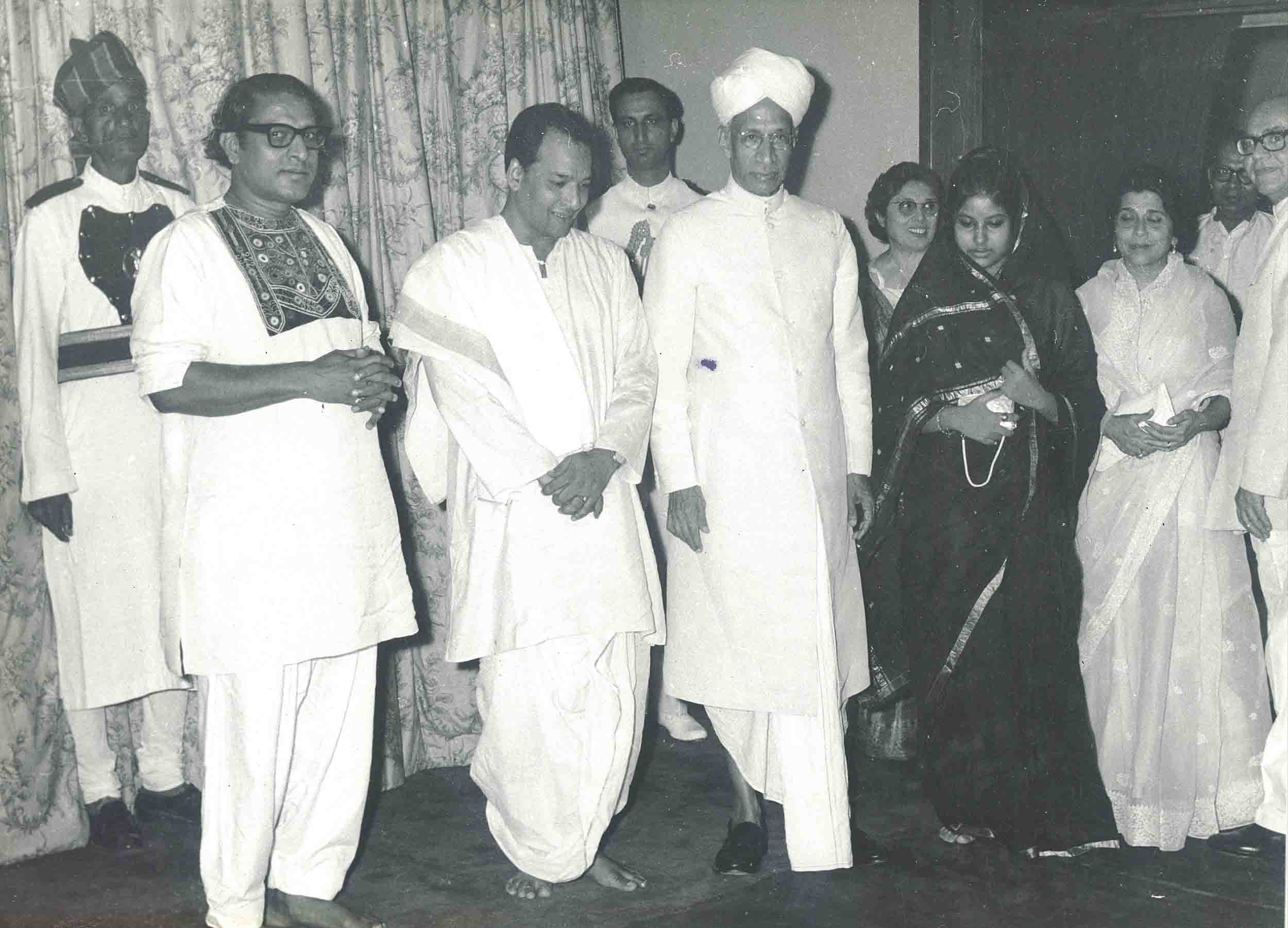
Vilayat Khan with President Dr. Radhakrishnan at Rashtrapati Bhavan, 1963

Vilayat Khan performed at the All Bengal Music Conference, as his first concert, organised by Bhupen Ghosh in Kolkata with Ahmed Jan Thirakwa on tabla. His performance at the concert organised by Vikramaditya Sangeet Parishad, Mumbai, in 1944 drew the headline "Electrifying Sitar". In the 1950s, Vilayat Khan worked closely with instrument makers, especially the famous sitar-makers Kanailal & Hiren Roy, to further develop the instrument. Also, he liked to perform without a tanpura drone, filling out the silence with strokes to his chikari strings.

Some ragas he would somewhat re-interpret (Bhankar, Jaijaivanti), others he invented himself (Enayatkhani Kanada, Sanjh Saravali, Kalavanti, Mand Bhairav), but he was first and foremost a traditional interpreter of grand, basic ragas such as Yaman, Shree, Todi, Darbari and Bhairavi. He was known for improvisation with his knack for finding different patterns in the ragas he played.

Vilayat Khan was both a traditional sitar player and a maverick innovator in his music. He was given a lot of credit for developing a sitar style called 'gayaki ang', where his sitar attempted to mimic the sound of the human voice and seemed to give the audience a sense that the sitar was singing. He invented a technique of bending a note after the sitar string was plucked, creating a sound after-effect from it. This technique later influenced other sitar players.

When he died from lung cancer in 2004, Vilayat Khan had been recording for over 65 years and broadcasting on All India Radio almost as long. He had been touring outside India off and on for more than 50 years, and was probably the first Indian musician to play in England in 1951 after independence. In the 1990s, his recording career reached a climax of sorts with a series of ambitious CDs for India Archive Music in New York, some traditional, some controversial, some eccentric. During his long career, he toured and performed in South Asia, China, Africa, Europe and the former Soviet Union.

Vilayat composed and conducted the score for three feature films – Satyajit Ray's Jalsaghar (1958) in Bengali, Merchant-Ivory Productions' The Guru (1969) in English, and Madhusudan Kumar's Kadambari (1976) in Hindi. He won a silver medal for his music for Satyajit Ray's Jalsaghar at the 1st Moscow International Film Festival in 1959. Vilayat gave a chance to newcomer singer Kavita Krishnamurthy in Kadambari — the first song in her long and successful career.

== Personal life ==
The Imdad Khan family is of Rajput lineage. In an informal continuation of his Rajput lineage, Vilayat Khan's father Enayat Khan kept a Hindu name of Nath Singh. Vilayat Khan himself composed many bandishes using the pen name, Nath Piya. In an interview given to Karan Thapar for the BBC in early 2002, Vilayat Khan admitted to having the Rajput name – Kahan Singh.

Khan spent much of his life in Calcutta (now Kolkata). He was married twice. With his first wife, Monisha Hazra, he had three children—Yaman Khan, Sufi singer Zila Khan, and sitarist Shujaat Khan (b. 1960).

By his second marriage, Vilayat Khan had one son, Hidayat (b. 1975), also a professional sitarist. Vilayat Khan was also survived by his younger brother, Imrat Khan. The brothers played duets in their youth but had a severe falling-out and for years were not on speaking terms. Vilayat's nephews Rais Khan, Nishat Khan, and Irshad Khan are also sitar players.

Vilayat took few disciples other than his sons; among the best-known are Kashinath Mukherjee (younger brother of film director Hrishikesh Mukherjee), Arvind Parikh, Debashis Datta and Hasu Patel. He also gave sitar lessons to Big Jim Sullivan, the famous English session musician. He trained his daughter, Zila, in sitar and vocal music and also made her a formal student in a ceremony in 1991. The ceremony appears in a documentary made in 1991 and also in India's Ministry of External Affairs film on his life, entitled Spirit to Soul. Vilayat Khan made the United States his second home and had a residence in Princeton, New Jersey besides Dehradun and Kolkata, India.

== Controversy ==
In 1964 and 1968, respectively, Vilayat was awarded the Padma Shri and Padma Bhushan awards – India's fourth and third highest civilian honours for service to the nation – but refused to accept them, declaring the committee musically incompetent to judge him. "Pointing out that sitar and its 'Parampara' (tradition) had seen the longest ever tradition in his family and his ancestors had chiseled the 'Gayaki Ang' (style mimicking the sound of human voice), crucial to the playing of the instrument, Khan said no other 'gharana' was older than his in this arena."

In January 2000, when he was awarded the Padma Vibhushan, the second-highest civilian award, he again refused, going so far as to call it "an insult". This time he stated that he would not accept any award that other sitar players, his juniors and, in his opinion, less deserving, had been given before him. "If there is any award for sitar in India, I must get it first", he said, adding that "there has always been a story of wrong time, wrong person, and wrong award in this country".

He alleged that the Sangeet Natak Akademi had been influenced by lobbying, politics, and favouritism while deciding the awardees. He was awarded the 1995 Sangeet Natak Akademi Fellowship, the highest honour conferred by Sangeet Natak Akademi, India's National Academy for Music.

Among other honours he turned down was the Sangeet Natak Akademi Award in 1995. For a while, he also boycotted All India Radio. The only titles he accepted were the special decorations of "Bharat Sitar Samrat" by the Artistes Association of India and "Aftab-e-Sitar" (Sun of the Sitar) from President Fakhruddin Ali Ahmed.

== Death and legacy ==
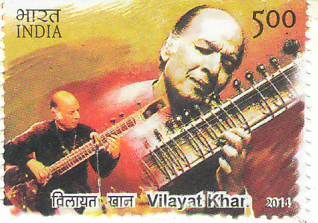
Vilayat Khan 2014 stamp of India

Vilayat Khan died on 13 March 2004 in Mumbai at age 75. The Press Trust of India reported that Vilayat Khan had lung cancer, diabetes, and hypertension. Among his survivors were his wife, two daughters, and two sons Shujaat Khan and Hidayat Khan, who are also sitar players.

NDTV (New Delhi Television) reportedly quoted the prime minister of India, Atal Bihari Vajpayee, saying this in a statement, "Ustad Vilayat Khan was a child prodigy to whom goes the credit of taking the sitar beyond the shores of this country."

In September 2014, a postage stamp featuring Khan was released by India Post commemorating his contributions.

According to The Hindu newspaper, "As for the eternal question, who is the greatest of them all, it would appear that there are many greats and there is Vilayat Khan", "... an artist who had transformed his instrument to resemble the human voice".

== Selected discography ==
Primary artist

- India's Master of the Sitar (1969, Capitol/EMI)

Contributing artist

- The Rough Guide to the Music of India and Pakistan (1996, World Music Network)
- When Time Stood Still with Kishan Maharaj (2006, Navras).

== Footnotes ==
He kept his childhood interest in vocal music all his life, often singing in concerts, and composed khyal bandishes using the pen name Nath Piya.
