= Pathans in India =

Residents of India of ethnic Pashtun ancestry

Total population
- 3.2 million (2018; AIPJH estimate); 21,677 (2011 census figure of Pashto-speakers)

Regions with significant populations
- Uttar Pradesh; Bihar; Madhya Pradesh; Delhi; Gujarat; Rajasthan; Maharashtra; Jammu and Kashmir; Punjab; West Bengal; various other locations

Languages
- Urdu–Hindi; Pashto; Dari; others

Religion
- Majority: Sunni Islam; Minority: Shia Islam
- ^aThe census figure only records individuals who speak Pashto as their first language, rather than the total number of individuals of full or partial Pashtun ancestry.

Pathans in India are citizens or residents in India who are of ethnic Pashtun ancestry. "Pathan" is the local Hindavi term for an individual who belongs to the Pashtun ethnic group, or descends from it. (Note: The term additionally finds mention among Western sources, mainly in the colonial-era literature of British India. Historically, the term "Afghan" was also synonymous with the Pathans.) The Pashtuns originate from the regions of eastern Afghanistan and northwestern Pakistan, ethnolinguistically known as Pashtunistan.

There are varying estimates of the population of Pathan descent living in India, ranging from 3.2 million people per the All India Pakhtoon Jirga-e-Hind to "twice their population in Afghanistan" as per Khan Mohammad Atif, an academic at the University of Lucknow. In the 2011 Census of India, 21,677 individuals reported Pashto as their mother tongue.

Large-scale Pashtun migration began in the 11th and 12th centuries, as a result of the many Muslim empires and dynasties founded by Pashtuns in the Indian subcontinent. Pashtuns also arrived as traders, officers, administrators, diplomats, travellers, religious saints and preachers, students, and as soldiers serving in the armies of India's rulers. In many cases, migration and settlement occurred among whole clans. Today, the Pathans are a collection of diversely scattered communities present across the length and breadth of India, with the largest populations principally settled in the plains of northern India. Following the partition of India in 1947, many of them migrated to Pakistan. The majority of Indian Pathans are Urdu-speaking communities, who have assimilated into the local society over the course of generations. Pathans have influenced and contributed to various fields in India, particularly politics, the entertainment industry and sports.

== History ==
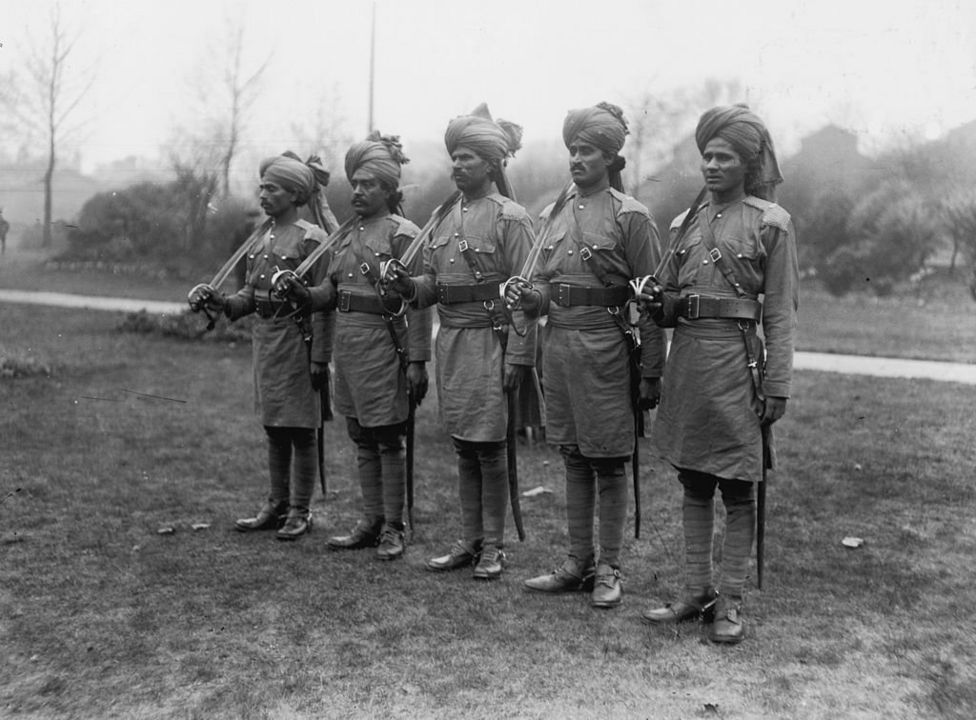
Pathans that had enlisted in the British Indian Army

The Pathans of India are a community who trace their ancestry to the Pashtun regions of Pakistan and Afghanistan. The Pashtun homeland is located in Central Asia and the northwestern region of South Asia; it roughly stretches from areas south of the Amu River in Afghanistan to west of the Indus River in Pakistan, mainly consisting of southwestern, eastern and some northern and western districts of Afghanistan, and Khyber Pakhtunkhwa and northern Balochistan in western Pakistan, with the Durand Line acting as the border between the two countries. The Hindu Kush mountains straddle the north of the region. Geographically, the Pathans are an eastern Iranic ethnic group who lived west of the Indo-Aryan ethnicities of the northern Indian subcontinent.

Some Pashtuns from the Ghilji tribe historically used to seasonally migrate to India in winter as nomadic merchants. They would buy goods there, and transport these by camel caravan in summer for sale or barter in Afghanistan.

== Demographics ==
Pathans of India descend from different tribes and clans. Some of the common Pashtun tribes found in India including the influential Ahmadzai and others like Afridi, Barakzai, Bettani, Panni, Sulemanzai, Tareen, Kakar, Sherani, Khattak, Orakzai and the Shinwari, Yusufzai including the mighty Ghilzai, Durrani and Lodi. There is also a population of Muslim Rajput Pathans in India (also known as Khanzada Rajputs) whose ancestors were Rajputs but got the title Khan after converting to Islam. After many generations, they are now intermixed with Pathans.

=== Hindu Pathans ===
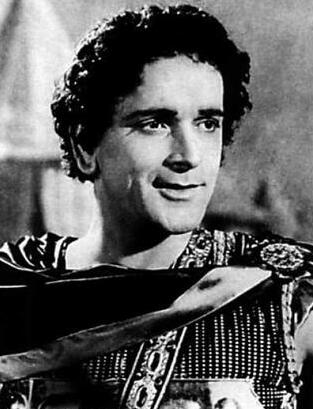
Prithviraj Kapoor in Sikandar (1941). The actor, of Punjabi descent, identified as a Hindu Pathan and spoke Pashto.

The term "Hindu Pathan" is used for Hindus who hailed or were born in the predominately Pashtun regions of British India (now Pakistan), as well as those who arrived from Afghanistan. The 1947 partition of India led to an exodus of Hindus settled in the former North-West Frontier Province (NWFP) and Baluchistan, which are part of modern Pakistan, into the newly independent India. Notable people from these regions, mainly Peshawar, who identified as Hindu Pathans include independence activist Bhagat Ram Talwar and union minister Mehr Chand Khanna; Prithviraj Kapoor, the progenitor of Bollywood's Kapoor family (along with his sons Raj, Shammi and Shashi Kapoor), also of Punjabi descent; his cousin, Surinder Kapoor (father of Anil Kapoor); actor Vinod Khanna, and film producer F.C. Mehra (father of Umesh Mehra). Pushpa Kumari Bagai writes that the Hindu Pathans in India, especially those who migrated from the Saraiki-speaking area of Dera Ismail Khan, had their own unique vegetarian cuisine. In her historical magnum opus River of Fire, writer Qurratulain Hyder makes reference to Hindu Pathans from the NWFP who were displaced by the partition and settled in India.

Some Hindus who lived in Balochistan prior to 1947, and later migrated to India following the partition, had a highly Pashtunized culture and spoke a form of Pashto or Balochi. They identified themselves culturally as Pathans and members of the Kakari tribe. Originating from Quetta and Loralai, they brought their customs and practices with themselves to India, where they became known as the Sheenkhalai (Pashto for "the blue skinned"). This name stemmed from a novel tradition their womenfolk practised, who would adorn their faces, hands and skin with permanent tattoos to enhance their appearance. These decorative, tribal tattoos were considered a form of art and beauty in their culture, however they were looked down upon by other Indians. The women wore a traditional hand-embroidered dress known as the kakrai kameez, similar to a firaq – the upper garment worn by Pashtun females. They also listened to Pashto music and would teach the language to their children. Due to their different culture and appearance, they were often stereotyped and considered Muslims or foreigners by the locals. The Sheenkhalai, numbering up to 500 at the time of partition, settled mostly in Rajasthan (in Uniara, Jaipur and Chittorgarh) and Punjab, and adopted Indian culture. In recent years, there have been efforts to revive their indigenous culture. In 2018, former Afghan president Hamid Karzai met members of this community and inaugurated the Sheenkhalai Art Project during the Jaipur Literature Festival. A feature-length documentary titled Sheenkhalai – The Blue Skin produced by Shilpi Batra Adwani, a third-generation Sheenkhalai herself, explores the history and origins of this community and was funded by the India–Afghanistan Foundation.

From the 1950s and onwards, some Pakistani Hindus from Peshawar and surrounding areas moved to India, settling chiefly in Amritsar, Jalandhar, Ludhiana and Firozpur, as well as in Delhi, Rajasthan and other places across India. As of 2005, they numbered over 3,000 families including both Hindus and Sikhs. Amritsar itself was home to over 500 Peshawari families, and most of them lived in an area known as the Peshawari Mohalla where they had set up a Hindu temple for the community. They were mainly businesspeople. According to the Hindustan Times, around 250 Hindu and Sikh families were living in an area named "Mini Peshawar" near Chheharta in Amritsar as of 2016. Although Peshawar was not as violently affected by communal riots as other regions during the partition, the Peshawari Hindus cited economic issues, security challenges and religious violence as reasons for their emigration after independence. A wave of similar migrations continued in the 1980s, 1990s and 2000s. After living in India for some time, these Hindus are able to secure Indian citizenship. The elderly Peshawari Hindus are distinguishable due to their Peshawari clothing and the Peshawari turban which some of them wear, and they converse in Pashto or the local Peshawari dialect. However, the younger generation is not fluent in these languages.

Since the 1970s, thousands of Afghan Hindus have also settled in India while escaping war and persecution. Many of them had lived in the Pashtun areas for generations, spoke Pashto, and practised a culture that was Pashtun-influenced.

=== Diaspora ===
A secondary diaspora of Pathans from India also exists, including those who were transported from British India to various other colonies as indentured workers in the early 19th century.

== Distribution ==
=== North India ===
In July 1954, over 100,000 Pashtun tribes people living in Indian-administered Jammu and Kashmir were granted Indian nationality. They are a mostly endogamous, Pashto-speaking community whose ancestors migrated from what is now Pakistan and Afghanistan prior to India's independence. The village of Gotli Bagh in Ganderbal district is home to around 10,000 Pashtuns. The community observes Pashtun customs such as jirga for mediation on disputes, and Pashto television channels like Khyber TV are followed to keep up to date with news in the region. They mostly marry within their community, which has allowed their language and culture to be preserved intact.

The city of Malerkotla is home to a significant population of Punjabi Muslims, some of whom are of Pathan origin. It is notably the only Muslim-majority city in Indian Punjab, since the partition in 1947. The princely Malerkotla State was established and ruled by a Pathan dynasty of Sherwani and Lodi origins. The Pathans in Malerkotla were considered an influential group and were principally landowners. Their numbers dwindled after many of them migrated to Pakistan. They are principally divided into the Yusufzai, Lodi, Tareen, Kakar and Sherwani tribes. The rulers of the state historically shared a harmonious relationship with their Hindu and Sikh subjects, giving them protection and equal rights as minorities, which is one of the reasons why the city was mostly spared from violence during the partition. Even after independence, members of the royal Pathan family have continued to receive political support in state elections.

Chandigarh is a common destination for Afghan students who pursue tertiary education in India. They numbered up to 500 as of 2019, and were enrolled in different institutes including Panjab University. The princely Pataudi State, which was founded by the Pataudi family and ruled by the Nawab of Pataudi, was centred in Pataudi in modern Haryana's Gurgaon district. The Pataudis were of Afghan descent, whose ancestors arrived in India in the late 15th century as mercenaries of the Pashtun emperor Bahlul Lodi, during the latter's reign. According to Mansoor Ali Khan Pataudi, the family are "basically Afghans with a bit of Turkish blood."

There is a small community of Pashto-speaking Hindus and Sikhs who migrated from Parachinar (in Pakistan's Kurram District) to Himachal Pradesh in 1948. They have an organisation known as the Akhil Bharatiya Parachinar Biradari, which seeks to gain Scheduled Tribal status for the community in order to secure various government incentives and opportunities committed under the National Commission for Scheduled Tribes for "displaced" communities. They are settled in a village also named "Parachinar" in Bharmour in Chamba district. These Parachinaris are noted for their Pathan dresses and turbans, their traditional Chitrali-influenced dance known as the gharra, and the Pashto dialect which they speak.

According to Sohail Hashmi, the Peshawari dress and turban were a common site on the streets of Delhi up until the 1960s. The area of Jangpura has long been a hub for Pathan Muslims, possibly due to its proximity to the Nizamuddin Dargah.

Across North India, the Pathan population is chiefly spread over 74 districts. Beginning in the 17th century, tens of thousands of "Rohilla" Pashtuns migrated into modern Uttar Pradesh and settled in what became known as the Rohilkhand region.

=== Western India ===
Pathans are noted as one of the Muslim castes living in Diu, which is part of the union territory of Dadra and Nagar Haveli and Daman and Diu.

Pathans are noted as one of the many Muslim communities in the state of Goa. They use the surname Khan, while the women may use Khatun, Khatu or Bibi. It has been noted that they freely marry outside their community.

Mumbai has been home to a Pathan community since the 19th century, mostly originating from the tribal areas of northwest Pakistan. Afghanistan has maintained a consulate-general in Bombay since 1915, alluding to the historic presence of Afghans and Pathans in the city.

The Afghan-born Karim Lala was one of the three most influential dons in the Mumbai underworld for decades. As the head of the "Pathan Gang", a mafia group comprising mostly ethnic Pathans involved in various types of organised crime, Karim Lala wielded significant political clout and was well known to both the elite and common man of Mumbai.

In Gujarat state most of the pathans are seen, those are Turks, Yousafzai, Afghans, Babi, Durrani, lodi.there are many notable persons comes from gujrat pathan like cricketer Salim Durrani, Parveen Babi actress.In area of Junagadh there are turk pathan are mainly seen in indian army and business

=== East India ===
There are Pathan families present in the city of Ranchi.

Odisha was historically one of the territories conquered by Pathans, most notably under Khwaja Usman.

The Bengal region was historically one of the territories ruled by Pathan dynasties in India. The Karrani dynasty, the last of the dynasties to hold the Bengal Sultanate, was of Pashtun origin. The city of Kolkata has been home to a large Afghan/Pathan community for generations, where they are known by the term Kabuliwala ("people of Kabul") and have historically constituted an integral part of the city's cultural fabric. The term is derived from the iconic and much-romanticised short story of the same name written by Rabindranath Tagore in 1892, which essays the tale of an Afghan merchant who journeys all the way to Kolkata and sells dry fruit. Once numbering over 10,000 in 2001, their population has reduced to no more than 2,000 to 5,000 as of 2015. Many of them were famous for working as traditional moneylenders, an industry which declined following the introduction of microfinance.

=== South India ===
During the British Raj in the 19th and early 20th centuries, Pashtun prisoners were among those who were transported "across the water" to the penal colony on the Andaman Islands for incarceration. One such incarceree who was serving life imprisonment on the island, Sher Ali Afridi, became known as the assassin of Lord Mayo, the Viceroy of India, while the latter was visiting the settlement in 1872.

According to Kumar Suresh Singh, in the state of Karnataka, the Pathans are "distributed in all districts."

According to S. N. Sadasivan, the Travancore region was home to a group of Pathan Muslims who were descendants of sepoys employed by the maharajas of Travancore. Susan Bayly notes that the 18th-century Travancorean maharajas actively recruited Pathan soldiers to train and lead their armies, as did many other South Indian kingdoms, who were keen to bolster their military capacities with the experiences of such men.

The former Hyderabad State had a Pathan community, and also an organisation known as the Pakhtoon Jirga which looked after the interests of the Pashtuns living within that state.

=== Northeast India ===
There are some Afghan businessmen who have been living in Assam for several decades. They are also known as Kabuliwalas.

Rajkumar Jhalajit Singh in A Short History of Manipur mentions Pathans as one of the communities among the Manipuri Muslims.

In Sikkim, the Muslims are categorised into two main social classes: the ashraf (aristocracy) and ajlaf (commoners). The former usually includes people of "Sayyad, Shaikh, Mughal and Pathan ethnic backgrounds."

== Culture ==
In India, the Muslim surname Khan is largely synonymous with and commonly used by Pathans as per Pashtun naming conventions, although not all Khans are necessarily of Pathan descent. The female equivalent used by Pathan women is Khanum or Bibi. In the caste system present among medieval Indian Muslim society, the Pathans (historically also known as ethnic 'Afghans') were classified as one of the ashraf castes – those who claimed descent from foreign immigrants, and who claimed the status of nobility by virtue of conquests and Muslim rule in the Indian subcontinent.

The earlier generations of Indian Pathans spoke their native language Pashto, while some still adhere to the traditional code and Pashtun way of life known as Pashtunwali. The Pashtun empires in India historically used the Dari Persian language. As a result of cultural assimilation with Indians over the course of several centuries, most Pathans in India lost the ability to speak Pashto and instead adopted Hindustani or other local dialects.

=== Cuisine ===
Pathan cuisine is known for its high emphasis on meat-based dishes. Typically, meat is either: boiled or roasted; marinated and barbecued in the form of tikka pieces placed on skewers in a grill; formed into different types of kebabs; cooked in large quantities in curries with mild spices; or prepared in a clay pot (e.g. handi gosht) – and eaten by hand with bread (e.g. Peshawari naan or roti), which is baked on a tandoor oven. Usually, the meat is kept intact and allowed to cook in its own fat. The chapli kebab, which originated in Peshawar, is a popular snack in Indian cities. Afghan immigrants in India have popularised other unique Afghan foods, such as the Afghani burger, Afghani naan, mantu dumplings, and Kabuli pulao. Afghan and Pathan recipes rely less on spices, and tend to be flavoured with salt, garlic, pepper, raisins, pinenuts, walnuts, and various dried or fresh fruits. Lajpat Nagar in Delhi is a hub of Pathan cuisines due to its sizeable Afghan population.

Tandoori chicken was popularised in India by Kundan Lal Gujral, a Punjabi Hindu-"Pathan" chef from Peshawar who moved to Delhi in 1947 and founded the Moti Mahal Delux chain of restaurants. Due to the Peshawari influences on Gujral's cooking, it is often regarded as a Punjabi-Pathan dish. Kundal Lal also invented the iconic butter chicken and dal makhani.

== Education ==
Each year, the Indian Council for Cultural Relations grants 2,325 scholarships to international students, with six-hundred and seventy-five spots being reserved especially for Afghans. In India, an increasing number of native students are learning Pashto at academic institutions such as the Jawaharlal Nehru University.

== Entertainment industry ==
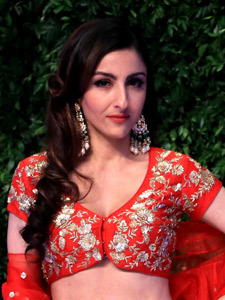
Soha Ali Khan, an actress belonging to the Pataudi family.

=== Cinema ===
The city of Peshawar in the North-West Frontier Province gave birth to several prominent actors in the Hindi film industry, Bollywood. Some Indian actors also have ancestry in Balochistan and Afghanistan. The Qissa Khwani Bazaar area of Peshawar is the location of the ancestral homes of the Kapoor family, Dilip Kumar and Shah Rukh Khan. Notably, the Hindko-origin Dilip Kumar (born Yusuf Khan) and Shah Rukh Khan, or the Punjabi-origin Hindu Pathans like the Kapoor family, while not ethnically Pathans, are often referred to as "Pathans" due to their culture and origins in Peshawar. Actor Naseeruddin Shah, along with his sons Imaad, Vivaan and nephew Mohommed Ali, belong to the family of the 19th-century Afghan warlord Jan-Fishan Khan, who was born in Paghman of Saiyid descent, and moved to India in the 1850s where he became the first Nawab of Sardhana.

Most of the Khans of Bollywood, however, belong to the Pathan community, including the Peshawar-born actor Jayant (born Zakaria Khan) and his son Amjad Khan; Kader Khan, who belonged to the Kakar tribe with parents from Kandahar and Pishin; the Tanoli-origin siblings Feroz, Sanjay and Akbar Khan, whose father settled in Bangalore from Ghazni, and their descendants Fardeen and Zayed Khan; the screenwriter Salim Khan and his sons Salman, Arbaaz and Sohail Khan (see Salim Khan family), whose Alakozai or Akazai ancestors migrated to Indore from the Swat region; the director-cum-producer siblings Nasir and Tahir Hussain – the former being the father of Mansoor Khan and maternal grandfather of Imran Khan, and the latter known as the father of Aamir, Faisal and Nikhat Khan – along with their nephew Tariq Khan, whose Pathan ancestors hailed from Herat; Saif Ali Khan, along with his sister Soha Ali Khan and daughter Sara Ali Khan, who, of royal Pataudi lineage, have relatives in Pakistan and ancestors that migrated from Afghanistan; and Irrfan Khan. Actress Madhubala, who is sometimes called the "Marilyn Monroe of Bollywood," was a Yusufzai Pathan. There have also been other Pathan film directors, producers and scriptwriters, such as Zia Sarhadi; Farah and Sajid Khan, who have Pathan ancestry from Peshawar; and in recent times, Kabir Khan.

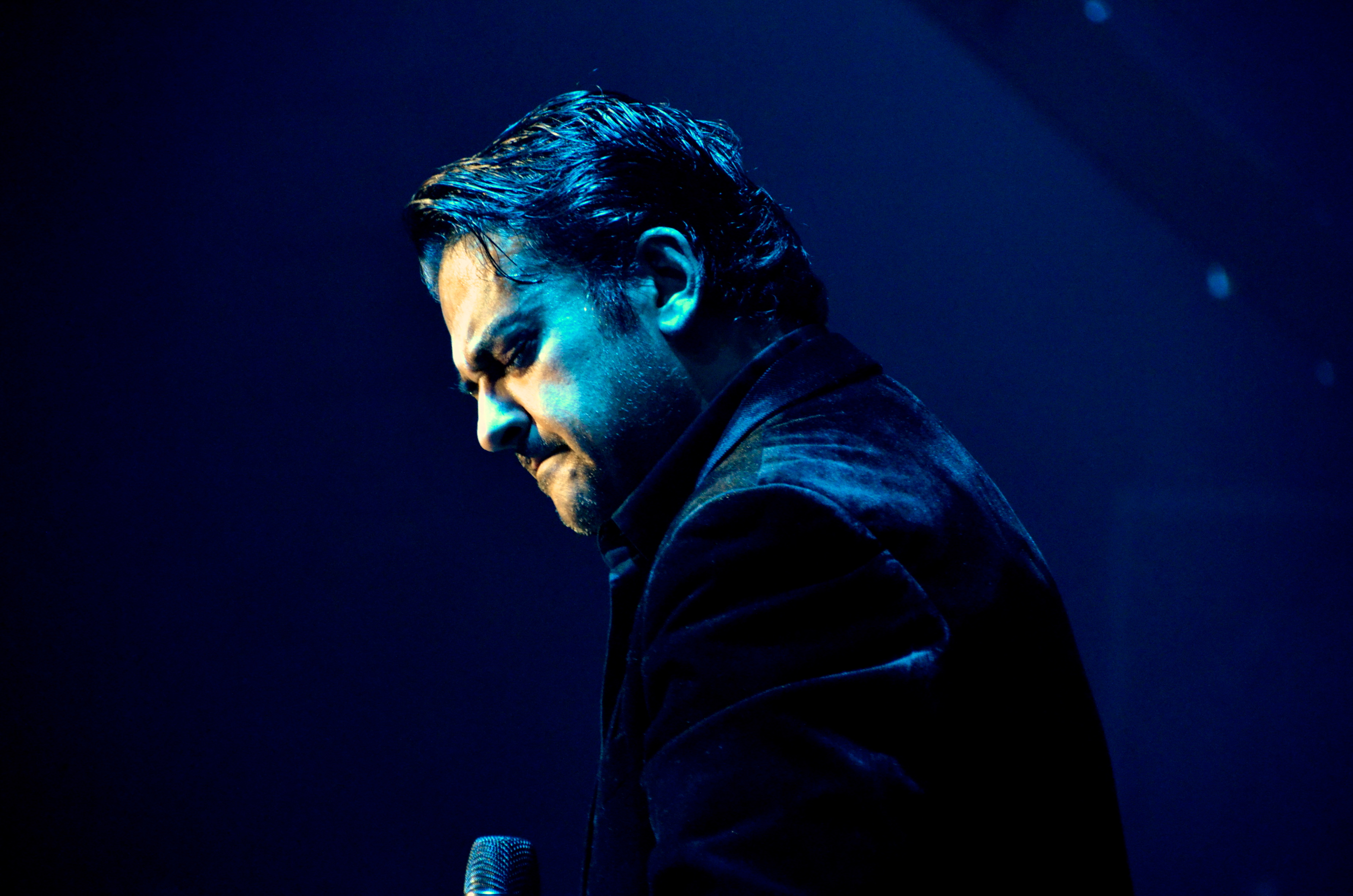
Adnan Sami, a pop singer and composer, while performing.

=== Music ===
Pathans have contributed to Indian music as well; the sarod, a stringed instrument used in Hindustani classical music, descends from the Pashtun rubab and was invented by the Bangash musical gharana which migrated to India (whose descendants include ustads Sakhawat Hussain, Hafiz Ali Khan, and the latter's son Amjad Ali Khan). G. M. Durrani was a noted Bollywood playback singer, music director and radio artist during the 1930s, 1940s and 1950s. In pop music, the Pakistani-origin Adnan Sami has been called the "reigning King of Indipop."Ayan Pathan...

=== In popular culture ===
Pathan characters have been portrayed in many Bollywood films, creating a subgenre of what are known as "Pathan movies". The 1947 theatrical play Pathan was produced by Prithviraj Kapoor's Prithvi Theatre, and was commercially successful across India. Prithviraj played the lead role while his sons Raj, Shammi and Shashi also acted. Kabuliwala (1961), in which Balraj Sahni essays the role of the protagonist, has been called the "mother of all Pathan movies". It is based on the short story of the same name written by Rabindranath Tagore in 1892, featuring the story of a wandering Afghan merchant in Bengal in pre-partition India. Earlier, a Bengali film based on this story was released in 1957.

It is believed that the famous Pathan character of Sher Khan, which was scripted by Salim–Javed and portrayed by Pran in Zanjeer (1973), was based on the Mumbai mafia don Karim Lala. The song Yaari Hai Imaan Mera, Yaar Meri Zindagi ("friendship is my faith, the friend is my life") from that movie features an influence of the Pashtun instrument rubab, and is danced to by men in the attan style. In 2013, a remake of the film was released in Hindi and Telugu simultaneously, in which Sanjay Dutt and Sri Hari reprised the role of Sher Khan, respectively. They featured in a qawwali-style Pathan dance number, Khochey Pathan Ki Zubaan.

The action film Qurbani (1980), in which a police officer named Amjad Khan (played by Amjad Khan himself) chases two fugitives (played by Feroz Khan and Vinod Khanna), featured a song Qurbani Qurbani which was set in a "Pathan's den". In the song, the three protagonists donned Pathan getup. Khuda Gawah (1992) stars Amitabh Bachchan as an Afghan tribesman who settles accounts with his enemies after finding himself trapped in an Indian prison, and was partially shot in Afghanistan.

== Literature and media ==
Urdu poetry in India developed under the influence of Pathans, in addition to various other communities belonging to the Perso-Arabic sphere of influence. One such prominent poet was Josh Malihabadi, an Afridi Pathan. His cousin, Abdur Razzaq Malihabadi, was also a writer.

=== Pashto in India ===
Pashto literature thrived in North India from the early 16th century up until the turn of the 19th century, even while Persian remained the dominant language of the region during the Mughal period. It was a provincial language spoken mainly by Pashtun administrative and military elites, and other Pashtun settlers and temporary dwellers in India. Extant manuscripts have provided evidence of Pashto verses and poetry emerging from the Ganges region. Pir Roshan, a Sufi who is regarded as one of the earliest Pashto writers, was a Pashtun from Waziristan who was born in Jalandhar. He inspired the Roshani movement which, during the late 16th and 17th centuries, gave rise to prominent Pashto poets and writers in the Indian subcontinent. The area forming modern-day Uttar Pradesh was among the few regions in India where Pashto literature continuously developed; Pashtun litterateurs from the Rohilla community produced works in the language up until the late 18th century.

The All India Radio (AIR) operates a Pashto-language service. Pashto was the first external radio service of AIR, broadcasting its inaugural transmission on 1 October 1939 for Pashto-listeners across British India's North-West Frontier Province and Afghanistan. Its purpose was to counter German radio propaganda infiltrating Afghanistan, Iran and West Asian nations following the outbreak of World War II. The Centre of Persian and Central Asian Studies (CPCAS) at New Delhi's Jawaharlal Nehru University offers bachelor-level degrees in Pashto.

The language is also used by Afghan Pashtun expatriates living in India.

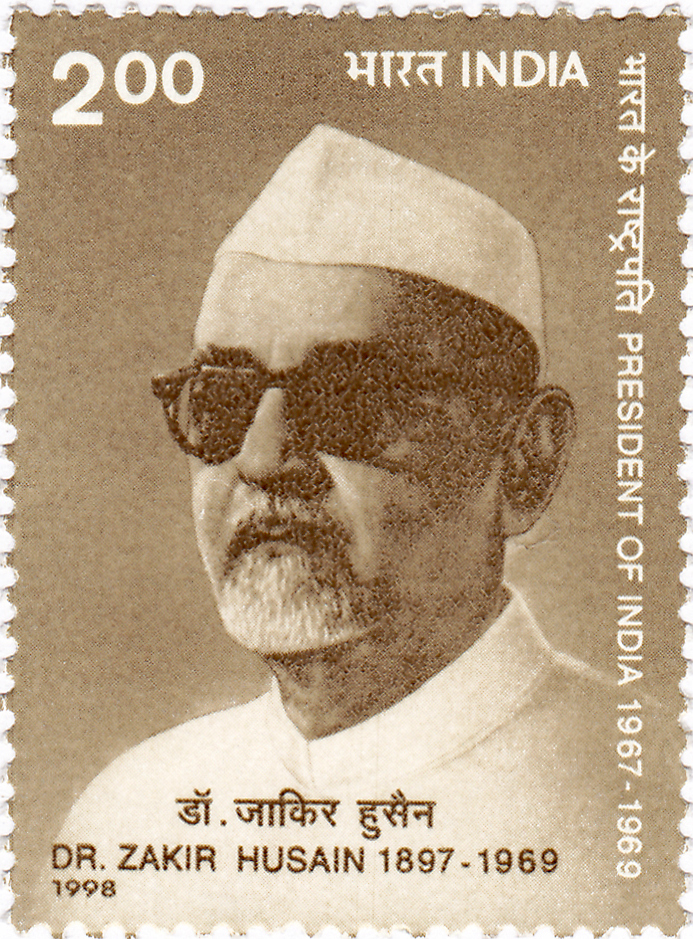
Zakir Husain, India's third president, on a 1998 postage stamp.

== Military ==
In British colonial India, the Pathans were classified as one of the "martial races" and enlisted in large numbers into the British Indian Army. The 40th Pathans, which later became part of the Pakistan Army, remained for some time the only all-Pathan regiment in British India. From 1897 to 1908, the number of Pathan servicemen in the British Indian Army arose from 2,500 to 10,500. Around a quarter were Afridis, and a large number were drawn from the tribal areas forming British India's northwestern frontier with Afghanistan. They comprised, in total, 67 companies across 43 regiments. By the time of World War I, their numbers had increased to 28,000.

== Politics ==
Abdul Ghaffar Khan was a Pashtun nationalist and close friend of Mahatma Gandhi who, as leader of the Congress-allied Khudai Khidmatgar, was one of the prominent members of the Indian independence movement against British rule before the partition. After 1947, he became a Pakistani citizen. Zakir Husain, an Afridi Pathan, was an economist and politician who served as the third president of India from 1967 to 1969. Prior to that, he was the second vice-president of India, and also served as the governor of Bihar. His maternal grandson Salman Khurshid served as India's minister for minority affairs, law and justice, and external affairs in successive terms. Mohammad Yunus was a career diplomat who served as India's ambassador in various countries, and also became a nominated member of the Rajya Sabha in 1989.

== Sport ==
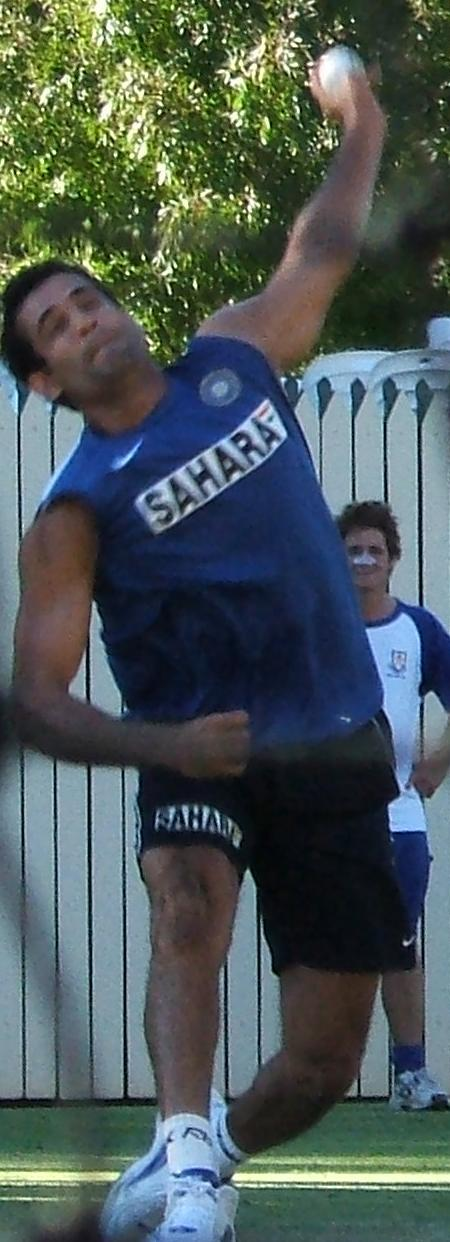
Irfan Pathan, while bowling in the nets.

Pathans have represented the Indian national cricket team both before and after independence. They include Jahangir Khan, a Burki Pathan who played for India between 1932 and 1936, later becoming a cricket administrator in Pakistan. Iftikhar Ali Khan Pataudi, the eighth Nawab of Pataudi, played for both England and India in the 1930s and 1940s, eventually captaining the Indian side in 1946. His son, Mansoor Ali Khan Pataudi, also played Test cricket as a batsman for India between 1961 and 1975 and became the country's youngest captain when appointed in 1962. The all-rounder Salim Durani (who in official cricketing records is referred to as the first Afghan-born Test cricketer, but was born near the Khyber Pass) represented India in Test cricket in the 1960s and 1970s. The brother duo of Yusuf and Irfan Pathan have together represented India at the national level across all formats.

In field hockey, Feroze Khan was a gold medalist for India at the 1928 Summer Olympics. He was a Pathan from Jalandhar, and migrated to Pakistan in the early 1950s. Ahmed Khan became a gold medalist for India at the 1936 Summer Olympics, while his son Aslam Sher Khan was a member of the Indian squad which won the 1975 Men's Hockey World Cup. They were Pathans from Bhopal.

In squash, Abdul Bari was one of India's leading players in the 1940s and represented the country at the 1950 British Open. Yusuf Khan was a ten-time all-India champion who later migrated to Seattle, United States, and turned to coaching several professional players; his daughters Shabana and Latasha Khan represented the US.

Ghaus Mohammad was the first Indian tennis player to qualify for Wimbledon quarter-finals, in 1939. He was an Afridi Pathan from Malihabad.

== List of notable Pathans of India ==
- Madhubala; Mumtaz Jehan Begum Dehlavi, the cinema superstar of India and the rest of the world, starred in over 60 films in the span of 20 years including the epic Mughal-e-Azam, the highest-grossing film in India's History.
- Amjad Khan – Indian actor known for his iconic portrayal of the character Gabbar Singh in the film "Sholay."
- Zareen Khan, Indian actress who made her debut in Bollywood. She has Pashtun ancestry from her father's side.
- Arbaaz Khan, Indian actor, film producer, and director. He is of Pathan descent.
- Aamir Khan, Famous Bollywood actor
- Salman Khan, Famous Bollywood actor
- Salim Khan, Film Producer, Screenwriter who revolutionised Indian Cinema
- Soha Ali Khan, Actress of Pataudi Royalty
- Ayaz Khan, Indian actor and model
- Irfan Pathan, Indian cricketer and brother of Yusuf Pathan
- Yusuf Pathan, Indian cricketer and brother of Irfan Pathan
- Hamidullah Khan, Last Nawab of Bhopal state
- Nawab Muhammad Amir Khan, The Founder of Tonk State in Hindustan
- Ashfaqulla Khan, Indian Independence freedom fighter against the British Raj who masterminded the Kakori train robbery and was executed by the Colonial Government
- Muhammad Ali Jauhar, prominent member of the Muslim League, Khilafat Movement and served as President of the Indian National Congress
- Shaukat Ali, Indian Muslim Khilafat activist
- Zakir Husain, Indian Educationist Politician who served as the third President as well as first Muslim Head of state of the Indian Republic
- Ahmed Raza Khan Barelvi, Islamic scholar and poet of Barech Durrani origin from Kandahār whose forefather accompanied Nader Shah
- Adnan Sami, Indian singer
- Ibrahim Khan Gardi, Chief commander of artillery in service of the Maratha Confederacy in the Third Battle of Panipat
- Dilip Kumar, Indian Legendary Bollywood actor from Peshawar
- Murad (actor) was an Indian character actor who appeared in more than 200 Hindi language films from the early 1940s
- Raza Murad India famous actor son of Murad (actor)

== See also ==
- Pashtuns
- Pathans in Sri Lanka
- Baloch people in India
- Afghans in India
- Pakistanis in India
