= Bimalendu Mukherjee =

Bimalendu Mukherjee (2 January 1925 - 22 January 2010) was an Indian classical sitar player and music teacher.

Mukherjee is a learned musician – although he was an Imdadkhani sitar student of Enayat Khan, a full list of his teachers also includes sitarist Balaram Pathak, khyal singers Badri Prasad and Jaichand Bhatt of the Patiala and Kirana gharanas, Rampur gharana beenkar Jyotish Chandra Chowdhury, sarangi and esraj players Halkeram Bhat (Maihar gharana) and Chandrikaprasad Dube (Gaya gharana) and pakhavaj player Madhavrao Alkutkar. He also studied with Birendra Kishore Roy Chowdhury, the zamindar of Gouripur in present-day Bangladesh, who taught him the moribund sursringar (bass sarod).

Mukherjee is the father and teacher of sitar player Budhaditya Mukherjee. His other students include Shri Sudhakar Sheolikar, Shri Avaneendra Sheolikar, Sanjoy Bandopadhyay, Sudhir, Anupama Bhagwat, Rajeev Janardan, Kamala Shankar.
