= Aayush =

Aayush may refer to:

- Aayush Mohan Indian musician
- Aayush Sharma Indian actor
