= Pathans in Sri Lanka =

Muslim community of Pashtun ancestry

Pathans of Sri Lanka
Total population
- 42,000 (2025)

Regions with significant populations
- Colombo · Kandy · Batticaloa

Languages
- Tamil · Sinhala

Religion
- Islam (Sunni)

Related ethnic groups
- Pathans of Tamil Nadu · Pashtun diaspora

The Pathans of Sri Lanka were a Muslim community in Sri Lanka of Pashtun ancestry. Most of them left in the 20th century, however, a small number of families living in the country still claim Pathan ancestry.

== History ==
=== Early history ===
Pathan traders from what is now modern Afghanistan and Pakistan arrived by boat in eastern Sri Lanka as early as the 15th century, via Colonial India. They landed in Batticaloa, which was a key port. Economic competition at the time led to frequent conflicts between Tamil fishing castes, particularly over control of resources. One nearby village known as Eravur, inhabited by Mukkuvars, was the target of multiple attacks and looting during harvesting seasons by Thimilar folks from Batticaloa. The Mukkuvars established an alliance with Batticaloa's Pathan warriors, enlisting their help to fend off the incursions and protect the village. The Thimilars were defeated and retreated northwards. (Note: In addition to the Pathans, it is known that there were also other Muslim trader groups who formed the alliance including Indian Moors, Turks and Arabs.)

The Mukkuvar–Pathan alliance became a key part of local folklore and temple mythology. The Pathans were rewarded through marriages with local women, and settled in Eravur. Their settlement may have been deliberate, so as to form a buffer against future invasions from the north. Some placenames in Batticaloa still appertain to the legendary battles between the Thimilars and the Mukkuvar-Pathans. They achieved a strong social status, becoming prosperous landowners and merchants in the Batticaloa region. As the Pathans were small in number, they assimilated into the wider Muslim community and commonly self-identified as Moors.

A similar history is recorded in Akkaraipattu, where itinerant Pathan traders helped the Mukkuvars quell a group of Vedda bandits, thereafter settling there.

=== Colonial period ===
The arrival of Pathan settlers continued during the colonial era, mainly for purposes of trade. Difficult economic conditions in their native homelands may have prompted their migration to the subcontinent's southern regions in the 19th century.

== Culture and religion ==
The term "Pathan" is a Hindustani-origin variant of the word "Pashtun". It is used in the Indian subcontinent to refer to individuals belonging to the Pashtun ethnic group. Locally, the Pathans were also known as Pattani, Pattaniyar, Kabuli, or simply Afghan. Some locals affixed the term Bhai (meaning "brother") to their names. They were adherents of Sunni Islam, and mainly originated from the Khyber Pakhtunkhwa and Baluchistan in British India (modern Pakistan) while others came from Afghanistan. The Pathans spoke Pashto and usually settled their disputes amongst themselves through a jirga system. Because they were predominately men who had migrated for employment, leaving their families behind, most only stayed for a temporary period. Those who decided to remain back married local women.

According to M.M. Maharoof, the colonial era Pathan immigrants were able to maintain their separate cultural identity. Their relationship with other Muslims was mostly confined to "the precincts of the mosque." However, those who intermarried with local Muslims such as the Moors and Malays became completely integrated into these communities, adopting their customs and dialects (Tamil, Sinhalese or Sri Lankan Malay) and lost much of their culture. Only a handful of families in Sri Lanka claim Pathan ancestry today.

== Demographics ==
Historical population
Year	Pop.	±%
1881	1,000	—
1901	270	−73.0%
1911	466	+72.6%
1921	304	−34.8%
1946	551	+81.2%
Source: Census of Sri Lanka.

In 1880, the Pathan population numbered around 1,000 in what was then British Ceylon. (Note: The Census of Ceylon used the term "Afghan" to refer to individuals of Pathan extraction.) They included horse keepers, textile merchants, traders, money lenders, and plantation workers in up-country estates. Others set up shops and grocery stores in small towns, or found work as butlers, valets, and colonial employees. Around 300 of them were based in Kandy, 100 in Trincomalee and Batticaloa, 150 in Colombo, and the remaining 450 in Jaffna, Kurunegala, Badulla, Haldummulla and Ratnapura districts. In 1898, the Church Missionary Review noted 64 male and ten female "Afghans" residing in Colombo. Patrick Peebles states that the Pathans were recognisable by their physical and facial features, their distinctive clothing and turbans, and were the subject of discriminatory usury laws. They were notable for their skills in sport, engaging in games such as wrestling or buzkashi, and usually lived together. The Pathans belonged to different tribes, including Afridi, Khilji, Yousafzai, Ahmadzai and Kakar, and the surname Khan was common amongst them. In 1901, their population had decreased to about 270.

A 1911 Census report described them as follows:

They are well known figures in the streets of Colombo and Kandy and in estate bazaars. They are tall and well formed... Their dress is distinctive – a loose tunic, baggy drawers, and thick boots. Their head dress is wound in rolls round the head, generally over a small skull-cap. There are some excellent wrestlers amongst them. They have their own chiefs and settle disputes amongst themselves. Their occupation they usually give as cloth sellers or horse traders, but their principal business is usury; they are the petty money lenders of the country.

In addition to plying trade in provincial cities like Colombo (including Slave Island) and Kandy, the community was also scattered itinerantly across hill country towns like Passara and Bandarawela. In 1921, the population was recorded at 304 individuals, decreasing from 466 in the previous census. Many Pathans returned home during the 1940s, while some migrated to India.

The 1946 Census identified 551 Pathans living on the island, the majority of them concentrated in Colombo and urban centres. They were primarily money lenders and creditors, a profession not traditionally occupied by natives, and were noted to be prosperous. Some were recruited as guards due to their imposing appearance, or worked in the postal service. K. P. S. Menon notes that the Ceylonese "did not mind borrowing money" from the Pathan lenders, but kept them at a distance as they were known to charge high interest rates. In fact, "almost the entire railway staff was in debt" to them, and "shut their eyes when their creditors traveled without tickets." The non-payment of dues was a matter that often ruthlessly invoked the taking of law into their own hands, which made the Ceylonese wary of them a great deal.

== Notable people ==
- Gool Mahomet, Afghan cameleer in Australia who initially worked in Ceylon
- Tuan M. Zameer Careem Khan Medical historian, author, and researcher

== See also ==
- Islam in Sri Lanka
- Memons in Sri Lanka
- Pathans in India
