= Subhra =

Subhra is a popular given name in India. It means "fair" or "white" in Sanskrit. It can be a female or male name. Usually the male name Shubhra is a shortened version of a longer name such as Subhrakant.

== Persons with this name ==
- Subhra Guha (born 1956), Indian singer of Hindustani classical music
- Subhra Sourav Das (born 1988), Indian actor

== Fictional characters sharing this name ==
Shuvro (শুভ্র in Bengali), sometimes transliterated as Shubhro or Śubhra, a fictional character created by Bangladeshi writer Humayun Ahmed.
