= Apratim Majumdar =

Indian classical sarod player

Apratim Majumdar (born 1978), is an Indian classical sarod player from Kolkata, India. His style is the "Dhrupadiya Veenkar" style of Alauddin Khan's Seni Beenkar Gharana.

== Tutelage ==
He was tutored by Rabin Ghosh, disciple of Alauddin Khan, for over nineteen years. Apratim also received training for a period of three years from Partho Sarothy, disciple of Dhyanesh Khan and Ravi Shankar.

Presently he is training under Pradip Kumar Chakraborty, a student of Ravi Shankar.

== Performances ==
Apratim has performed at the National Center for the Performing Arts (NCPA) - Mumbai, Swami Haridas Sangeet Sammelan - Mumbai, Vasantrao Chandorkar Smriti Pratisthan - Jalgaon, Kal Ke Kalakar Sangeet Sammelan - Mumbai, Indian Classical Music Young Talents' Conference - Kolkata, Swar-Sadhana Samiti - Mumbai, Uttarpara Sangeet Chakra Annual Music Conference (Kolkata), and India International Center (Delhi).

== Awards and achievements ==
He was awarded prizes by West Bengal State Music Akademi and The Dover Lane Music conference in the year 2000. He received the prestigious "Sur Mani" title by the Sur Singar Samsad Mumbai.

== Notes ==
- https://web.archive.org/web/20250204234808/https://www.theindianpanorama.news/ny-nj-ct/sriniketan-foundation-to-host-sangeet-mahotsav-2024-a-classical-music-extravaganza-featuring-internationally-acclaimed-artists/
- Community Calendar. India—West. October 25, 2013. Accessed September 4, 2025. https://search.ebscohost.com/login.aspx?direct=true&db=f6h&AN=91746167&lang=ru&site=eds-live&scope=site
