= Kalyan Mukherjea =

Dr. Kalyan Mukherjea
- Born: Kalyan Kumar Mukherjea; 1943
- Origin: Calcutta, West Bengal, India
- Died: 2010 (aged 67)
- Genres: Hindustani classical music
- Occupations: Composer, Sarod player
- Instrument: Sarod
- Years active: 1956–1995
- Label: India Archive Music

Kalyan Kumar Mukherjea (1943–2010) was an authority on Indian classical music, particularly the Senia Shahjahanpur Gharana (school) of Sarod. He was also a mathematician.

== Early life ==
Mukherjea was born in Calcutta in 1943. His father, A K Mukherjea, was a barrister who rose to become a judge of the Supreme Court of India. Justice Mukherjea was also a scholar of Indian philosophy, and had made significant contributions to Navya-Nyāya literature. Kalyan thus grew up in a milieu that placed considerable significance on erudition and culture.

Justice Mukherjea's close friends included musicians like the sarod maestro Radhika Mohan Maitra. Young Kalyan began training under Maitra in 1956. He also studied with the sitarist, vocalist and composer Dhruvatara Joshi.

Mukherjea's musical education continued uninterrupted throughout his performing career, but there were periods during which he was not under the direct tutelage of a master (1962–1965 and 1967–1976). These years spent in relative isolation from the Indian music scene, Mukherjea believes, contributed as much to his growth as a musician as did his formal training. Mukherjea has had a unique experience, doubling as a mathematician and an uncompromising classicist on the sarod.

== As a mathematician ==
Mukherjea obtained his undergraduate degree from Cambridge University, followed by a doctorate in mathematics from Cornell. In 1968, he joined the mathematics faculty of UCLA. He remained at UCLA until 1976, when he returned to India to take up a professorship at the Indian Statistical Institutes in Delhi and Calcutta.

His research interests primarily concerned topology. He had to his credit authoritative publications in Fredholm manifolds and coincidence theory. In collaboration with his erstwhile research student Rajendra Bhatia, he had also contributed to matrix analysis.

His work had spawned a significant body of further research, by his erstwhile students as well as colleagues and contemporaries. He had also mentored several significant contributors to the field, including Rajendra Bhatia and Mahan Mitra.

== As a musician ==
While at UCLA, Mukherjea served as an instructor of Hindustani instrumental music in the newly formed ethnomusicology department, and collaborated closely with Nazir Jairazbhoy in the early days of the program. His students include Peter Manuel, Professor of Music at Hunter College, CUNY, who has acknowledged his debt to Mukherjea in several publications.

Mukherjea performances have been limited. His 25-year span as a performing artist saw him play about fifty concerts in all. It was entirely by chance that he encountered Lyle Wachovsky of India Archive Music, New York, who gave his music a global audience by publishing a full-length CD of Ragas Shuddha Kalyan and Shukla Bilawal. Additionally, from 1983 to 1990, Mukherjea was a regular broadcaster on All India Radio, Delhi.

Mukherjea's music is rooted in tradition but does not rigidly adhere to convention. His approach values logic and aesthetic sensitivity above other considerations. A good example of this is his approach to interpreting the controversial Raga Shuddha Kalyan, which finds mention in an article by Deepak Raja on the issue.

== Death ==
Mukherjea died on 31 March 2010, after suffering a heart attack a few weeks before.

== Publications ==
=== Journal articles: mathematics ===
Bhatia, Rajendra; Mukherjea, Kalyan K (1994), "Variation of the Unitary Part of a Matrix", SIAM Journal on Matrix Analysis and Applications, 15 (3): 1007–14, doi:10.1137/S0895479892243237

Mukherjea, Kalyan K (1970), "The Homotopy Type of Fredholm Manifolds", Transactions of the American Mathematical Society, 149 (2): 653–663, doi:10.2307/1995419, JSTOR 1995419

Mukherjea, Kalyan K (1972), "New Methods in Coincidence Theory", Proceedings of the American Mathematical Society, 34 (2): 615–20, doi:10.2307/2038417, JSTOR 2038417

Mukherjea, Kalyan K; Sankaran, Parameswaran (1996), "Invariant points of maps between Grassmannians" (PDF), Proceedings of the American Mathematical Society, 124 (2): 649–53, doi:10.1090/S0002-9939-96-03152-8

=== Books: mathematics ===
1. Mukherjea, Kalyan:Differential Calculus In Normed Linear Spaces, American Mathematical Society, 2003 (ISBN 8185931437, Hardcover)

=== Writings: music ===
Radhika Mohan Maitra – His Life and Times

=== Discography: music ===
Raga Shuddha Kalyan, India Archive Music, 2003

== Legacy ==
In 2010, The National Law School of India University named the Best Speaker trophy at the National Law School Debate, South Asia's largest Asians Parliamentary debate, after him.
