= Yaroslav Senyshyn =

Canadian pianist and author (born 1950)

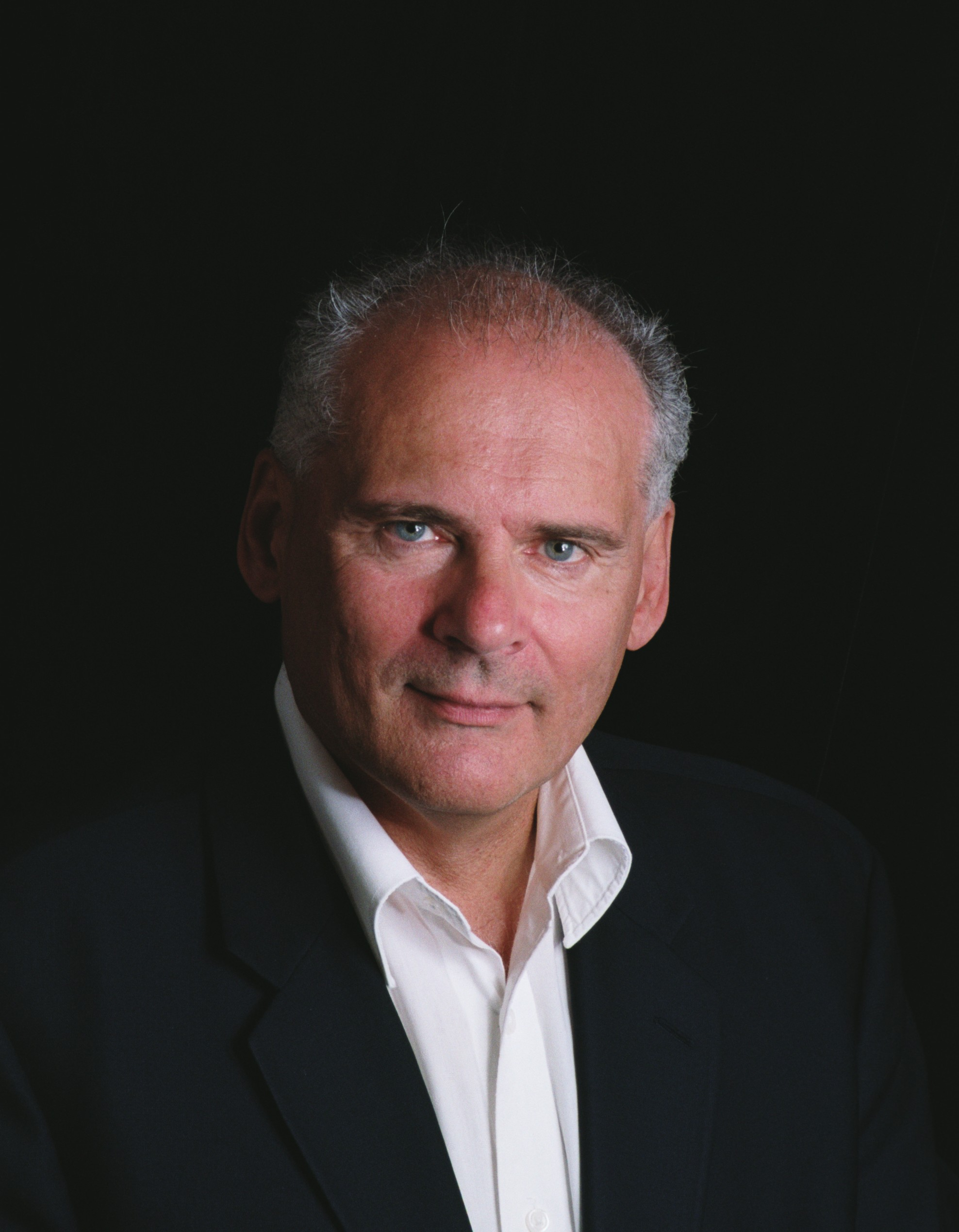
- Yaroslav Senyshyn
- Born: April 20, 1950 (age 76); Toronto, Ontario, Canada
- Other name: Slava Senyshyn
- Occupations: Classical pianist; Professor of Music and Philosophy
- Years active: 1973–present
- Website: Albany Records

Yaroslav Senyshyn, also known as Slava, is a Canadian pianist, author, and professor of philosophy, aesthetics of music, and moral education at Simon Fraser University's Faculty of Education.

== Education ==
Senyshyn was a student of Antonina Yaroshevich at the Kyiv Conservatory and of Canadian pianist and composer Larysa Kuzmenko. He has also studied with Damjana Bratuž, Howard Munn, Clifford von Kuster, Katherine Wolpe, and Pierre Souverain.

Year	Degree	University
1992	Ed. D., Philosophy of education	Ontario Institute for Studies in Education, University of Toronto
1976	Bachelor of Education	University of Toronto
1975	M. Mus., Music Performance	University of Toronto
1973	B. Mus., Music Performance	University of Western Ontario

== Career ==
Senyshyn was a member of the SFUFA (Simon Fraser University Faculty Association) Safety Committee and sat from 2006–2009 as an executive member-at-large on the Canadian Association of University Teachers.

Senyshyn is a professor of music, philosophy of aesthetics, and moral education at Simon Fraser University's Faculty of Education. He has published in journals such as Philosophy of Music Education Review, the Journal of Educational Thought, Educational Leadership, and the Canadian Journal of Education. Senyshyn has given lecture-recitals and made publications that focus on the teacher-as-artist and the contribution that music makes to arts education.

Senyshyn is especially known for his Liszt performances. He performs and records standard repertoire along with contemporary works by composers including Larysa Kuzmenko, Donald Cochrane, and Reeves Miller.

=== Research ===
Senyshyn's focus is on interdisciplinary research in arts and moral education. His method of philosophical analysis draws mainly on an existential-phenomenological approach. His work includes a discursive analysis of students' performance anxiety that uses a theoretical exploration of social constructionism based on Ludwig Wittgenstein's philosophy. He has focused on specific topics related to creative performance, teaching and music aesthetics vis-à-vis co-authorship of musical texts, subjectivity, objectivity, and anxiety in the moral-aesthetic fabric of society.

Senyshyn is one of the co-investigators on the Research For Youth, Music and Education and MODAL Research Project, which researches youth engagement in musical activities, as well as artistic learning research.

== Discography ==
- Yaroslav Senyshyn: Rachmaninoff Preludes and Etudes – Tableaux (2012)
- Yaroslav Senyshyn Live: Bach-Siloti Beethoven Liszt Miller Cochrane (2010)
- Yaroslav Senyshyn Live Volume II: Schubert Schumann Tchaikovsky Liszt (2010)
- Yaroslav Senyshyn Live Volume III: The Kennedy Center: Beethoven Chopin Brahms Revutsky Schubert Smith (2010)
- Yaroslav Senyshyn & Suzie O'Neill-Senyshyn: Live at Von Kuster Hall (Piano and Flute) (2009)

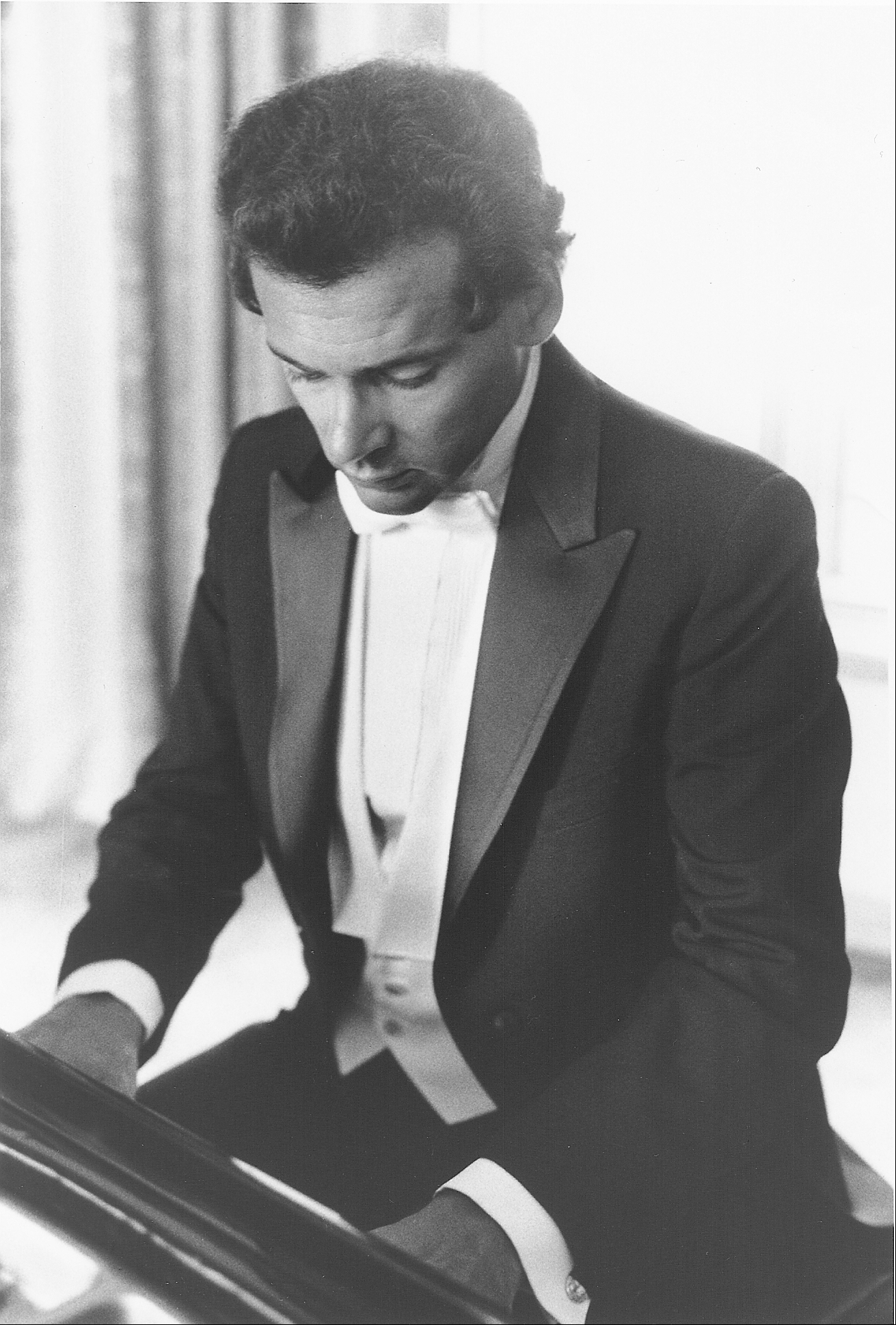
Yaroslav Senyshyn at the piano in 1986

== Performances ==
Senyshyn has performed in New York City's Carnegie Hall, Washington's John F. Kennedy Center for the Performing Arts, Toronto's St. Lawrence Centre for the Arts and Massey Hall, and the Bolshoi Theatre at the Moscow Conservatory. Georgetown University Radio featured Senyshyn in a program about Canadian pianists, alongside Glenn Gould, Louis Lortie, Angela Hewitt, and Anton Kuerti. Senyshyn is an official Steinway Artist, and is signed with Albany Records.

Senyshyn was one of two pianists chosen to represent Canada at the 1974 International Tchaikovsky Competition in Moscow. He has been a guest performer at various venues and institutions, including the University of Western Ontario. He regularly performs benefit concerts to raise awareness of social justice issues, including annual benefit concerts in Ottawa with his wife Susan O’Neill-Senyshyn in support of Discovery University's courses for low-income and homeless people.

Senyshyn has collaborated with sitar player Sanjoy Bandopadhyay.

Senyshyn released two of William David Smith's compositions, Image Op. 33 nos. 1 and 2 on the Albany Records in an album with his wife, Susan O'Neill-Senyshyn, a flautist. The album also featured the works of Franck and Ibert for piano and flute. Senyshyn also performs solo works by Liszt and Canadian composer Larysa Kuzmenko and Reeves Miller on the album.

== Selected publications ==
=== Essay reviews ===
- Senyshyn, Yaroslav (2008). "'Plato: His Precursors, His Educational Philosophy, and His Legacy' (Robin Barrow)". Paideusis. 17 (2): 91–98. doi:10.7202/1072434ar. S2CID 146793514.
- Senyshyn, Yaroslav (2006). "Creativity in Sport: Originality, Transformation, Indeterminacy, and New Concepts in the Arts". Journal of Educational Thought. 40 (2): 185–196. doi:10.11575/jet.v40i2.52586. JSTOR 23767173. ProQuest 213796225.
- Senyshyn, Yaroslav (1 January 1996). "Horowitz and the enigma of art". Interchange. 27 (1): 79–84. doi:10.1007/BF01807488. S2CID 144262091.
- Senyshyn, Yarosla V. (1 September 1993). "Reason as crapshoot". Interchange. 24 (3): 317–321. doi:10.1007/BF01434781. S2CID 144869050.

=== Refereed journal articles ===
- Senyshyn, Yaroslav (2011). "Respecting Students, Acquiring Humility, and Ignoring the Curriculum". Journal of Educational Thought / Revue de la Pensée Educative. 45 (2): 145–164. doi:10.11575/jet.v45i2.52227. JSTOR 23767077. ProQuest 1080970268.
- Remington Abramson, Neil; Senyshyn, Yaroslav (May 2010). "Effective Punishment Through Forgiveness: Rediscovering Kierkegaard's Knight of Faith in the Abraham Story". Organization Studies. 31 (5): 555–581. doi:10.1177/0170840610372202. S2CID 145682696.
- Abramson, Neil Remington; Senyshyn, Yaroslav (1 October 2009). "Punishment and Forgiveness: A Phenomenological Analysis of Archetypal Leadership Patterns and the Implications for Educational Practice". Interchange. 40 (4): 373–402. doi:10.1007/s10780-009-9101-8. S2CID 143978370.
- Senyshyn, Yaroslav (2008). "Wittgenstein and the Aesthetics of Educational Administration: Philosophical Biography and Thought". EAF Journal. 19 (1): 81–102, 112.
- Senyshyn, Yaroslav (2008). "The Good and its Relation to Music Education". Philosophy of Music Education Review. 16 (2): 174–192. doi:10.2979/PME.2008.16.2.174. S2CID 143136951. Project MUSE 257223.
- Remington Abramson, Neil; Senyshyn, Yaroslav (May 2010). "Effective Punishment Through Forgiveness: Rediscovering Kierkegaard's Knight of Faith in the Abraham Story". Organization Studies. 31 (5): 555–581. doi:10.1177/0170840610372202. S2CID 145682696.
- Senyshyn, Y. "Understanding and Working with Performance Anxiety in Education" (under review).
- Senyshyn, Y. " 'Once Upon a time in the West': Opera and Soundscape" (in preparation).
- Senyshyn, Y. "Respecting Students, Acquiring Humility and Ignoring the Curriculum" (under review).
- Senyshyn, Y. (2004/2005) "The Hegelian Exhaustiblity of Art and Danto's End of Philosophy: Existential Thought and Polymetric Music in Di Cicco's Poetry" (Italian Canadiana (University of Toronto), 18, 37–48.
- Senyshyn, Y. (2005). "Rise of Authoritarianism in Higher Education: A Critical Analysis of the Research Assessment Exercise in British Universities". Journal of Educational Thought. 39 (3): 229–244 – via Questia.
- Senyshyn, Y. (2005) "Old Texts and Opera – Inciting Students to Read". Educational Leadership – "The Adolescent Learner", 62(7), 74–77.
- Senyshyn, Yaroslav (2003). "Musical Aphorisms and Common Aesthetic Quandaries". Philosophy of Music Education Review. 11 (2): 112–129. doi:10.2979/PME.2003.11.2.112. S2CID 144339596.
- Senyshyn, Yaroslav; Vézina, Danielle; Fraser, Simon (2002). "Wittgenstein, Collingwood, and the Aesthetic and Ethical Conundrum of Opera". Philosophy of Music Education Review. 10 (1): 27–35. JSTOR 40327171.
- Senyshyn, Yaroslav; O'Neill, Susan A. (2001). "Subjective Experience of Anxiety and Musical Performance: A Relational Perspective". Philosophy of Music Education Review. 9 (1): 42–53. JSTOR 40495452.
- Senyshyn, Yaroslav (1999). "A Kierkegaardian Perspective on Society and the Status of the Individual as a Performing Musician". Philosophy of Music Education Review. 7 (2): 80–92. JSTOR 40327139.
- Senyshyn, Yaroslav (17 May 2018). "The Passionate Teacher and the Curriculum Police: Perspectives on Modes of Subjectivity and the Curriculum as Art". Journal of Educational Thought. 33 (2): 153–174. doi:10.11575/jet.v33i2.52572. JSTOR 23767364.
- Senyshyn, Yaroslav (1999). "Perspectives on Performance and Anxiety and Their Implications for Creative Teaching". Canadian Journal of Education / Revue canadienne de l'éducation. 24 (1): 30–41. doi:10.2307/1585769. JSTOR 1585769.
- Senyshyn, Yaroslav (1999). "Computational Thinking and Cognitive Hangovers". Bulletin of the Council for Research in Music Education (141): 135–138. JSTOR 40318999.
- Senyshyn, Y. (1998) "Opera and Co-authorship: Implications for Ethics and Aesthetics". Musica-Realta, 55.
- Senyshyn, Yaroslav (1 December 1998). "Kierkegaardian Implications of Punishment, Guilt, and Forgiveness for Education". Interchange. 29 (4): 425–437. doi:10.1023/A:1026469219949. S2CID 142919864.
- Senyshyn, Yaroslav (1996). "Kierkegaard's Aesthetic Stage of Existence and Its Relation to Live Musical Performance". Philosophy of Music Education Review. 4 (1): 50–62. JSTOR 40327106.
- Senyshyn, Yaroslav (1995). "?The Crisis:? A practical realization of Kierkegaard's aesthetic philosophy". Interchange. 26 (3): 257–264. doi:10.1007/BF01435510. S2CID 73558236.
- Senyshyn, Yaroslav (1995). "Kierkegaard, musical performance, and the relation and differentiation of the sexes". Interchange. 26 (2): 105–126. doi:10.1007/BF01435143. S2CID 143991166.

=== Book chapters ===
- Senyshyn, Y. (1998) "Subjectivity Revisited: Passion as Truth in Music Education". In Eunshik Choi and Myng-sook Auh (Eds.), "Searching for a New Paradigm of Music Education Research". Editors: The Korean Music Education Society, Hawoo Publishers.
- Senyshyn, Y. (2004) "Popular Music and the Intolerant Classroom" in Questioning the Music Education Paradigm Published by the Canadian Music Educators' Association as Volume 2 of The Biennial Series, Research to Practice, Lee R. Bartel, Series Editor. Toronto: Canadian Music Educators' Association. pp. 110–120.
- Senyshyn, Y. (2007) "Philosophy and Music in the Art of a Poet" in The Last Effort of Dreams by Francesco Loriggio, Waterloo: Wilfrid Laurier Press. ISBN 978-1-55458-019-4.
- Senyshyn, Yaroslav (2009). "Kierkegaard, emotion, and the individual: passion of the infinite as the truth for educational leadership". In Samier, Eugenie A; Schmidt, Michèle (eds.). Emotional Dimensions of Educational Administration and Leadership. Routledge. doi:10.4324/9780203870808. ISBN 978-0-203-87080-8.
- O’Neill, S. and Senyshyn, Y. (2011). Philosophical and Psychological Learning Theories: How They Shape Our Understanding of Musical Learning In Colwell, R. and Webster, P. MENC Handbook of Research on Music Learning. New York: Oxford University Press.

=== Books ===
- Senyshyn, Y. (2010) The Artist in Crisis: Kierkegaard's Philosophy of the Aesthetic Stage of Existence and Live Musical Performance. Vancouver, BC: Platon Promotions Publishing. ISBN 978-0557523443, 978-0557560936
- Senyshyn, Y. (in preparation) Upside Down and Inside Out: a Fresh Look at Teachers and Teaching in Education
- Senyshyn, Y. (in preparation) A Tractatus of Music
- Senyshyn, Y. (in preparation) Essential Issues in Music Performance

=== Refereed conference proceedings ===
- O'Neill, S., Senyshyn Y. (2012) "On Meaning Making and Measurement of Student Music Engagement by ISME Research Commission 2012, July 8–13 Thessaloniki, Greece, The International Society for the Study of Music Education: Bulletin of the Council for Research in Music Education (in press).
- Senyshyn, Y. (2005) "Anxiety and Memory in Live Musical Performance" published in the Proceedings of the APSCOM 2 (The Second International Conference of Asia Pacific Society for The Cognitive Science of Music) held in Seoul, Korea from August 4–6, 2005, pp. 190–194, ISBN 89-5708-090-2.
- Senyshyn, Y. (2002) "The Philosophy and Psychology of Performance Anxiety and its Subjective, Relational, and Discursive Potentiality" Proceedings of the 7th International Conference on Music Perception and Cognition, Sydney, 2002, 117–120. C. Stevens, D. Burnham, G. McPherson, E. Schubert, J. Renwick (Eds.). Adelaide: Causal Productions. ISBN 1-876346-39-6
- Senyshyn, Y. (1999) "Wittgenstein, Music and Colour: Implications of Scientism and Inwardness". Toward Scientific Literacy: The History and Philosophy of Science and Science Teaching" Proceedings of the Fourth International Conference, Canada, June 21–24, 1997. Edited by Linda Lentz and Ian Winchester. Faculty of Education, University of Calgary Publications, 671–681 (CD of Conference Proceedings: 1999).
