= Radhika Mohan Maitra =

- Radhika with sarod

Background information
- Born: 1917
- Origin: Talando, Tanore, Rajshahi, Bangladesh; (Calcutta, Bengal Presidency, British India)
- Died: 16 October 1981 (aged 63–64)
- Genre: Hindustani classical music
- Occupation: Sarod player
- Instrument: Sarod Mohan Veena Sursingar Seni Rebab
- Formerly of: Buddhadev Das Gupta, Kalyan Mukherjea Sanjoy Bandopadhyay, Narendra Nath Dhar, Samarendra Nath Sikdar, Michael Robbins

Radhika Mohan Maitra (1917–1981) was one of the most respected sarod players from India. He was the guru of Narendra Nath Dhar, Kalyan Mukherjea, Buddhadev Das Gupta, Sanjoy Bandopadhyay, Abanindra Maitra, Pranab Kumar Naha, Samarendra Nath Sikdar, Michael Robbins, and many other musicians of this generation. Maitra was considered an influential figure in 20th century sarod playing and received the title Sangeetacharya. He was among those awarded the Sangeet Natak Akademi Award in 1971.

Radhika Mohan Maitra came from a Bengali zamindar family that had a history of musicianship and of patronising that art. At present this is at Talando of Tanore upozila of Rajshahi district in Bangladesh. His grandfather, Lalit Mohan Maitra, was a player of the tabla, his father, Brajendra Mohan, played the sarod, and his mother learned the sitar. Among those who were patronised by his grandfather was Mohammed Amir Khan and it was he who acted as the guru and principal teacher of Radhika, although the pupil also learned other instruments and styles of music with his permission. In addition to his musical training, Maitra held an M.A. degree in philosophy, awarded by the University of Calcutta, and also a LL.B. law degree. He taught philosophy for a while and was also a noted musicologist with several books to his name.

Maitra rose to prominence as a musician in the 1950s, when he was in demand for concerts both within India and elsewhere in the world. Aside from radio recitals, he performed in countries such as Afghanistan, Australia, China, New Zealand and the Philippines as part of cultural delegations organised by the Government of India, and he also performed in a non-government tour of the US in 1975. It was from around that time that he gradually reduced his appearances, preferring instead to concentrate on teaching both the sarod and the sitar. His students were often obtained by a referral method, whereby a potential new pupil was introduced by someone who was already being taught by Maitra. Sometimes he would teach directly, and other times he would delegate the task to a student.

In 1976, Radhika Mohan founded the Mohammed Ameer Khan School of Instrumental Music, which was dedicated to the development of young talent in Sarod and Sitar to carry the banner of the Shahjahanpur Gharana forward. He started the ‘Rising Talents' music conference in 1977, which focused on providing opportunities to young and talented artists, irrespective of their Gharana or Guru, to perform in front of the music loving audience of Calcutta. This program became very popular and continued even after his death, till the mid nineties. Some of the most well known names in today's Indian Classical music scene got an opportunity to perform on the big stage for the first time at the Rising Talents conference.

In July 1944, Maitra married Lalita Chaudhuri, a lady from the "royal family" of Sushang. He died in 1981, aged 64, following an accident.

Radhika Mohan Maitra invented the Mohan Veena in 1948 and in 1949 it was adapted at All India Radio by Thakur Jaidev Singh, the then chief producer of All India Radio in New Delhi. In this instrument the goat skin of the sarod is replaced by wood and the bridge of the sarod is replaced by the bridge of Surbahar. He performed several programs on Mohan veena in All India Radio which are available now in public domain and are the assets of AIR archives.. He also created two other instruments namely the Dilbahar and Nabadeepa.
