= Anupama Bhagwat =

Indian sitar maestro

- Origin: Bhilai, India
- Genres: Indian classical music
- Occupations: Musician and sitarist
- Instrument: Sitar
- Website: www.anupamabhagwat.com

Anupama Bhagwat is an Indian sitar maestro.

== Early life ==
Born in Bhilai, India, Bhagwat was introduced to playing sitar at age 9 by Shri. R. N. Verma. At 13, she started training under Bimalendu Mukherjee, doyen of the Imdadkhani gharana. She stood first in the All India Radio competition in 1994 and was awarded a national scholarship by the Indian Ministry of Human Resource Development of India.

Bhagwat is currently based in Bengaluru, and she has performed several venues in America and Europe.

== Her Guru ==
Doyen of the Imdadkhani Gharana, Acharya Bimalendu Mukherjee was primarily a Sitarist, though he was proficient in almost all traditional Indian instruments like RudraVeena, Saraswati Veena, Surbahar, Sursingar, Mandrabahar, Dilruba, Esraj, Tar Shehnai, Sarod and Pakhavaj. He was equally adept in vocal music.

== Performances ==
Performances have taken her around the world Including, SouthBank Center (London, UK), Ali Akbar Khan School of Music (Basel, Switzerland), MIT Fall Concert Series (Boston, USA), U Penn, Berkeley, Ole Miss (USA), Asian Arts Museum (San Francisco), U of Victoria & Calgary, Musée Guimet, Paris, Musée Des Beaux Arts, Angers, France.

Anupama plays in the Gayaki style, a lyrical and subtly nuanced style modelled upon the human voice. Anupama's technical virtuosity has been lauded by connoisseurs worldwide. Anupama has been awarded the title "Surmani".

== Awards and recognitions ==
- Stood 1st in the All India Radio Music Competition (1994)
- Scholarship from the Ministry of Human Resource Development (Government of India) From 1993 to 1996
- Conferred the title 'Surmani' by Sur Shringar Sansad in 1995
- Has been part of world performances such as Global Rhythm and Shanti.
- Received grants in 2000, 2002, 2004, and 2008 from the Ohio Arts Council (USA).
- The asteroid 185325 Anupabhagwat, discovered by Italian amateur astronomer Vincenzo Silvano Casulli in 2006, was named in her honor.

== Albums ==
Anupama has released various albums such as Confluence, Ether, Epiphany, Colours of Sunset, Sanjh. And many more.
