= Sursingar =

Musical instrument

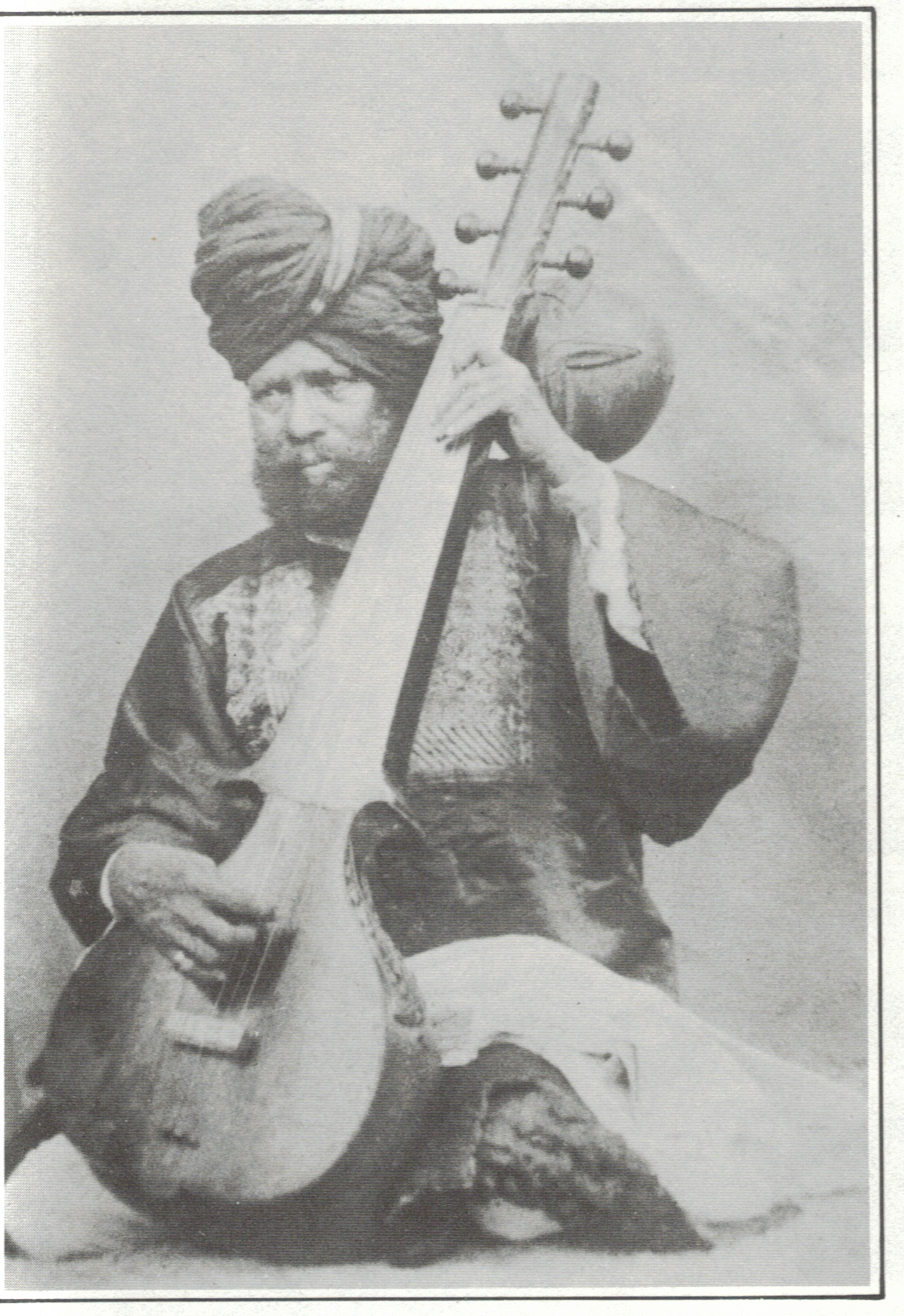
Sursingar player

The sursingar (IAST: sursiṅgār), sursringar or surshringar (Sringara: Pleasure in Sanskrit), is a musical instrument originating from the Indian subcontinent, having many similarities with the sarod. It is larger than the sarod and produces a deeper sound. It precedes the sarod chronologically.

In Dhrupad style, it was used as a solo instrument in the 19th and 20th centuries. It is regarded as a further development of the Dhrupad-Rabab that has more or less disappeared today. Its neck has a metal fingerboard and the steel and bronze strings are played with a metal pick, while the bridge is made of a flat horn. It has two resonant boxes; the main box is made from a cut gourd, on which a wooden cover is attached.

== Construction and Playing style ==
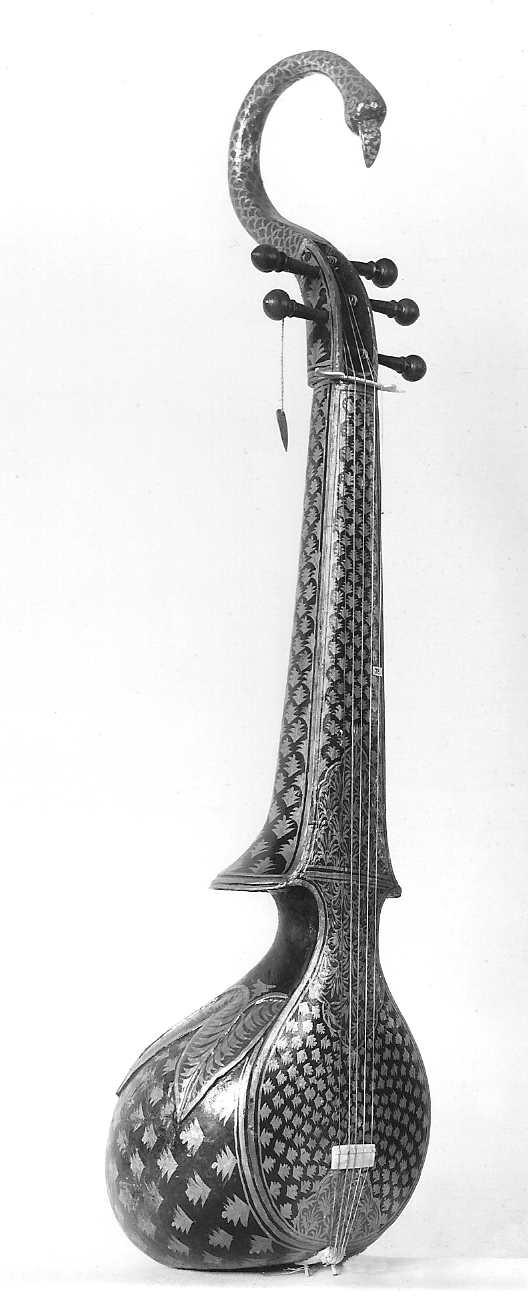
19th century Sursingar made by Ali Akbar Khan.

The main body is made of wood and not leather (the material used in earlier instruments). The sound producing mechanism of the instrument is formed by a gourd. The gourd is attached to a hollow wooden neck. The neck is sometimes covered with a metal plate to facilitate the glissando. It has four main strings and four rhythmic drones (chikari). However other variants of Sursringar are known to exist which have nine or ten strings and also one which has tarabdar or sympathetic strings in addition to the above strings. The strings are usually made of brass (instead of catgut used in earlier instruments). These modifications resulted in the increase of resonance in the instrument and thereby in its popularity.

The instrument is supported by the left shoulder, and is played with a plectrum (mezrab) or tab (and sometimes with a bow). It is used to play music in the Hindustani style Dhrupad. Musicians also play it like a sarod where the instrument is held almost parallel to the ground or like a sitar where the instrument is held at an angle to the ground.

Only the Sursringar, Surbarhar, and Veena are capable of rendering the low, sustained pitches necessary for Dhrupad. Unlike the other two, the Sursringar is also capable of delivering sweet notes that are high in pitch. Of the three, the Sursringar has the most played strings making it possible to render beautiful intervals, chords, and drones. In addition, due to the fretless stainless steel fingerboard, the Sursringar has the capacity to easily emit meend (glissando) that is 2 octaves long. Sursringar was well-suited for vilambit (slow) alap, and the techniques of both veena and rabab playing could be incorporated in it. The instrument Rabab had some limitations. It's gut strings and skin parchment upon the resonator makes the slow passages of alap, impossible unlike the Veena. Moreover, due to the dampness in the monsoons, the sound of Rabab used to deteriorate so much that the notes played on it could not even be discerned. Sursringar became a distinct improvement over the rabab with regard to the tonal quality and for the alapchari of dhrupad anga. The melodious effect of Sursringar was so overpowering that it could even outshine the veena in its vilambit alap. Thereafter, it became a tradition amongst the Rababiya gharana to play the Sursringar during the rainy season.

The instrument was well received in the world of music and became popular in a very short time in northern India. Sarod players used to play alap on the Sursringar before playing gat on Sarod in the same manner as Sitar players used to play on the Surbahar before playing gat on the Sitar. Therefore, it was customary to learn the Sursringar along with the Sarod till the early years of the twentieth century. Gradually, when the sarod and sitar were modified and became well equipped with a greater range of expressiveness, the popularity of the Sursringar and Surbahar ebbed and these became obsolete in the latter half of the twentieth century.

In earlier days musicians from the Senia Gharana declined to teach the Veena to students who were not from their family. Instead, the students were instructed to play the dhrupad and the dhamar idioms of the Veena on the Sursringar ( for those who had a Sarod or Rabab background). For example, Ustad Allauddin Khan learned Dhrupad on the Sursringar from the famous Veenkar(Veena player), Ustad Wazir Khan of the Rampur Senia Gharana and Pandit Radhika Mohan Maitra learned the Sursringar from Ustad Mohd. Dabir Khan, also from the Rampur Senia Gharana. Hence the baj (playing style) of the Sursringar follows the slow, meditative style of Dhrupad. Later attempts have been made to reduce the size of the Sursringar so that the player can play the faster idioms of the Sarod while keeping the tonality and the depth of the Sursringar. To this end, Pandit Radhika Mohan Maitra created the Mohan Beena (different from Vishwa Mohan Bhatt's Mohanveena).

== Notable performers ==
Pyar Khan, Basat Khan, Jaffar Khan, Mohammad Ali Khan (Son of Basat Khan), Bahadur Sen Khan, Allauddin Khan, Radhika Mohan Maitra, Kumar Birendra Kishore Roy Choudhury, Shaukat Ali Khan were noted Sursringar players. Allauddin Khan had a few Sursringar recordings as did Radhika Mohan Maitra.
