= Rajeev Janardan =

- Origin: India
- Genres: Indian classical music
- Occupation: Musician
- Instruments: sitar, surbahar, rudra veena
- Spouse: Poorvi Bhana
- Website: Official web site

Rajeev Janardan (born 1967) is an Indian classical sitar player of the Imdadkhani gharana (school), taught by Bimalendu Mukherjee. He lives in New Delhi.

Following on from good reviews for a performance at the India International Centre in 1996, he has performed extensively both within India and overseas, including Switzerland in 2008. He is married to Poorvi Bhana and they have a son Jahaan.
