= Dhruvatara Joshi =

Indian sitarist, scholar, and composer

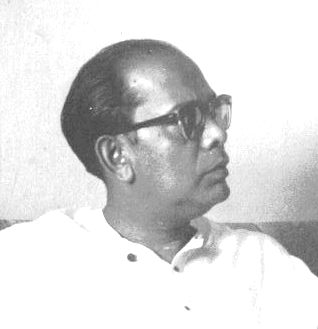
Dhruvatara Joshi

Pandit Dhruvatara Joshi (Dhrubatara Joshi) or Joshiji (1912–1993) was an exponent of Hindustani Classical Music. A sitarist, vocalist, scholar and composer, Joshi ji was trained in the traditions of the Etawah Gharana and the Agra Gharana of the Hindustani Classical Music.

== Early life ==
Born in Lucknow, Uttar Pradesh in India on 1 October 1912, he was the son of Taradutta Joshi and Dr. Manorama Devi. He held a master's degree in Philosophy from the University of Lucknow.

== Career ==
Pandit Joshi shifted from Lucknow to Kolkata, to learn sitar under the tutelage of Ustad Enayat Khan of the Etawah Gharana, after meeting the Ustad in an instrument shop. Ustad Enayat Khan, the father of Ustad Vilayat Khan, often referred to Joshiji as his eldest son. Pandit Joshi has been deemed a guiding figure for the young Ustaad Vilayat in the string tradition After Ustaad Enayat's untimely demise, he shifted to vocal music under the tutelage of Aftab-e-Mausiqi Ustad Faiyaz Khan as a "gandabandh shagird" as per instructions of Ustad Enayat Khan . Gradually he became a specialist in Dhrupad, Dhamar, Khayal and Thumri, characteristic of the Agra Gharana.

Pandit Joshi served the All India Radio (AIR) in the capacity of Deputy Chief Producer. His presentation on Experiments in Orchestration of Indian Music in the AIR music symposia has been preserved by the Ministry of Information and Broadcasting, Government of India, in edited volume. Later, he joined the Indira Kala Sangeet Vishwavidyalaya, Khairagarh as the pioneering Dean of the music faculty. Further, he served the Visva Bharati University, in Shantiniketan, as the Head of the Department of Hindustani Classical Music. Today, Joshiji's biography is taught in the university as a part of the C-XIV (Practical) course in Masters of Music in Hindustani Classical Music. He founded the Padmaja Naidu College of Music, at the University of Burdwan.

== Awards and Recognitions ==
Pandit Dhruvatara Joshi has composed numerous bandishes under the pen name of "Premrang", "Rasik Piya" in Hindi and "Junu Lakhanbhi" in Urdu. His notable compositions include the melancholy "बिन देखे जीयेरा नहीं माने" (Bin Dekhe Jiera Nahin Maane).

Pandit Joshi has been a recipient of numerous accolades, awards and recognitions. Some notable mentions include "Sangeet Acharya" award by Prayag Sangeet Samiti, Fellowship of the Uttar Pradesh Sangeet Natak Academy in 1974, ITC Sangeet Research Academy Award in 1981, Bhuwalka Award of Sangeet Saurabh in 1984 and the Sangeet Natak Akademi Fellowship in 1979 by the Government of India.

He has been awarded a Doctor of Letters (D.Litt.) by the Rabindra Bharati University and the University of Burdwan. Also, he has been invited to share his experiences in national broadcaster platforms including All India Radio

== Legacy ==
Pandit Dhruvatara Joshi died on 28 September 1993 in Bardhaman, West Bengal, India. He is survived by his students including Vidushi Naina Devi, Vidushi Subhra Guha,, Dr. Sharmishtha Sen, Prof. Mohan Singh Khangura, Ustaad Golam Imam, Shampa Reza, Papia Sarwar, Prof. Tapasi Ghosh, Prof. Kalyan Mukherjea, Amzad Hossain, Prof. Sabyasachi Sarkhel. Randhir Roy (Esraj), Alpana Munshi,
