= Narendra Nath Dhar =

Indian classical musician

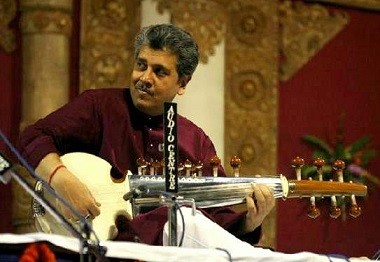
- Narendra Nath Dhar performing in the Dover Lane Music Conference, Kolkata

Background information
- Born: 7 September 1954 (age 72)
- Origin: Calcutta, West Bengal
- Genre: Hindustani classical music
- Occupations: Sarod artiste, Professor in Instrumental Music
- Instrument: Sarod
- Years active: 1971-Present
- Website: www.narendranathdhar.com

Narendra Nath Dhar (Bengali: নরেন্দ্রনাথ ধর; born 7 September 1954) is an Indian classical musician who plays the sarod, a string instrument. One of the finest exponents of the Shahjahapur/Gwalior Seniya Gharana, he is known for his purist style of play as well as his own emerging style. His style of playing can be distinguished from that of others.

== Early life and training ==
Dhar began his initial training in Sarod under his father, the late Nemai Chand Dhar. The early demise of his father was no deterrent in his pursuit of learning and growth. He started training under Pt. Samarendra Nath Sikdar, then disciple of Pt. Radhika Mohan Maitra. In 1969, Pt Maitra, later brought Dhar under his tutelage and played a crucial role in shaping him into one of the most exciting talents of his generation. His musical prowess received a further honing under Ustad Amjad Ali Khan.

== Style of play ==
Dhar has often been commended for keeping his style of play true to the core as well as giving his renditions an own idiomatic touch. His typical Alap reflects the true style of Tantrakari Been Ang as well as the traditional playing (Baaj) of 'Alap' and 'Jod'. The fine aspects of Sarod playing mark his innovation and creativity through 'Tantrakari', 'Laykari' and different styles of 'Ekhara Taan'. He has brought audiences all over the world the timeless compositions of great stalwarts of his generation and past.

== Performances and career ==
The talent of Dhar has been duly recognized over the years by audiences in India and overseas. He has performed in prestigious music conferences of India sharing the stage with veteran musicians and dancers. He was a prize winner in the All India Radio Music competition in instrumental music in 1970. He was also awarded the National Scholarship from the Department of Culture, Govt. of India for intensive training in Sarod from 1975 to 1978. In 1995, he was honoured with the prestigious Naushad Award by the Government of Uttar Pradesh for his outstanding contribution in the field of instrumental music. He was also awarded the Akademi Award by the Uttar Pradesh Sangeet Natak Akademi in 2000. A regular AIR and Doordarshan artist, His Master's Voice has released an audio cassette with the featuring title as 'Golden Talents of HMV'.
