= Sanjoy Bandopadhyay =

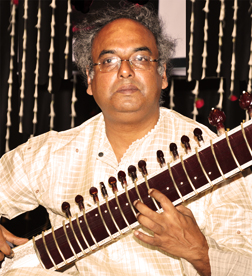
- Prof. Sanjoy Bandopadhyay

Background information
- Also known as: Sanjoy Banerjee
- Born: Sanjoy Bandopadhyay; 16 September 1954 (age 71)
- Genres: Indian classical music
- Occupations: Composer, sitar player, Academic
- Website: http://www.sanjoybandopadhyay.com/

Sanjoy Bandopadhyay (born 16 September 1954) is a Bengali Hindustani classical sitar player. He is primarily a disciple of Radhika Mohan Maitra and Bimalendu Mukherjee. His performance is a unique synthesis of Senia-Shahjehanpur, Rampur-Senia and Etawah gharana.

== Career ==
He is Chair Professor (Ustad Allauddin Khan Chair) at the Department of Instrumental Music, of Rabindra Bharati University, Kolkata India. He is also the Director, S.M. Tagore Centre of Documentation & Research of Languishing & Obsolescent Musical Instruments. This centre is created for ethnological mapping of the world through obsolescent musical instruments. The project will run with support from scholars from all over the world.

Bandopadhyay visited the University of Illinois at Urbana-Champaign as George A. Miller Visiting Professor(October 2005). In the same year he also visited the University of Alberta, Edmonton, Canada as Distinguished India Focus Visitor. He visited the University of Colorado at Colorado Springs [USA] in 2008 and University of Chicago [USA] in 2009 as artist in residence. He was specially invited to present a paper at the International Conference at the University of Amsterdam (2008).

Bandopadhyay is attached to a number of universities including the Department of Music, University of Delhi; Benaras Hindu University, Varanasi; Kashi Hindu Vidyapeeth, Varanasi; Visva Bharati, IKS University, Khairagarh; Utkal University, Orissa and more as adviser/expert.

He is also involved in a number in collaborative research projects at the national and international levels, including one with pianist Yaroslav Senyshyn, who is attached to the Simon Fraser University, Canada as a Professor.

He has produced 10 CDs and a DVD. He has widely performed in India, American, European and African continents.

== Labels ==
EMI-His Master's Voice, India Archive Music [USA]
