= Rabab =

Rabab or Rababe may refer to:

== Given name ==
=== Rabab ===
- Rabab Abdulhadi (born 1955), American professor, activist, and author
- Rabab Cheddar (born 1991), Moroccan boxer
- Rabab Eid (born 1990), Egyptian freestyle wrestler
- Rabab Fatima, Bangladeshi diplomat
- Rabab Fetieh, Saudi professor of orthodontics
- Rabab Hashim (born 1992), Pakistani television actress
- Rabab Al-Kadhimi (1918–1998), Iraqi poet
- Rabab al-Sadr (born 1944), Lebanese activist
- Rabab Ward, Lebanese-Canadian electrical engineer

=== Rababe ===
- Rababe Arafi (born 1991), Moroccan runner

== Music ==
- Rabāb or rebab, a bowed string instrument
- Rubab (instrument) or rabab, a Central Asian plucked instrument

== See also ==
- Rababe Arafi (born 1991), Moroccan middle-distance runner
