= Pashtun diaspora =

Ethnic Pashtuns living outside of Afghanistan–Pakistan

Pashtun diaspora (Pashto: بهر مېشت پښتانه) comprises all ethnic Pashtuns. There are millions of Pashtuns who are living outside of their traditional homeland of Greater Afghanistan, a historic region that is today situated over parts of Afghanistan, Pakistan and Iran. While the (erstwhile) Greater Afghanistan is home to the majority of Pashtun people, there are significant local Pashtun diaspora communities scattered across the neighbouring Pakistani provinces of Sindh and Punjab, particularly in their respective provincial capital cities of Karachi and Lahore. Outside of Afghanistan and Pakistan, Pashtun diaspora communities are found in the United States, the United Kingdom, Canada, Russia, the Netherlands, Australia and the Gulf Arab states.

The Pashtun people, who are an Eastern Iranian ethnolinguistic group, are believed to have settled in the traditional Pashtunistan region around the early 1st millennium AD.

== Statistics ==
Country	Ethnic Pashtuns	Year
United States	279,628	2024
United Kingdom	50,597	2021
Germany	48,000	2023
Tajikistan	32,400	2017
Canada	31,700	2021
Russia	19,800	2015
India	21,677	2011 (Note: Only includes those who speak Pashto as mother tongue.) (Note: A 2018 AJPH estimate places the number of people with distant Pashtun ancestry (having a Pashtun great grandparent) at 3.2 million. However, almost none of them speak Pashto.)
Australia	8,979	2021

== Native land ==
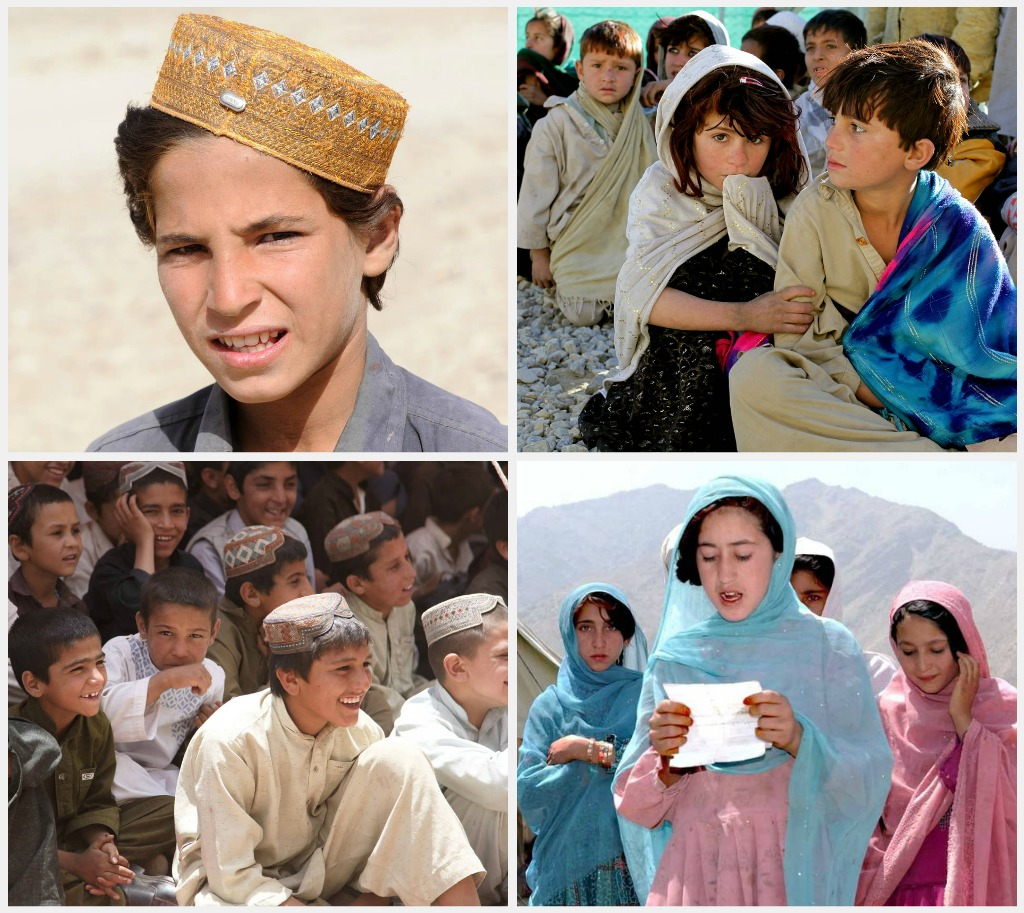
Pashtun people of Afghanistan

=== Afghanistan ===
The ethnonym Afghan (of Persian origin) has been historically used since the 3rd century AD to refer to the Pashtuns, and is now used to describe every citizen of Afghanistan. Pashtuns make up the largest ethnic group in Afghanistan, comprising 46–65% of the total Afghan population. Approximately 2 million Afghan refugees live in the neighboring Pakistan. The majority of them are Pashtuns who were born in that country.

The Pashtuns are scattered all over Afghanistan, they can be found in almost every province of the country. Kandahar is the second largest city in Afghanistan and a stronghold of the Pashtun culture. The city of Lashkargah in the south, Farah in the west, Jalalabad in the east, and Kunduz in the north are other prominent cultural centres whose populations are predominantly Pashtuns.

=== Pakistan ===
Most Pashtuns are based in Pakistan. Pashtuns are one of the largest ethnic minorities in Pakistan, making up to 15.4% of the total population of Pakistan. Pashtuns form the majority ethnic group in the province of Khyber Pakhtunkhwa and northern Balochistan.

With as many as 7 million by some estimates, the city of Karachi in the Sindh province hosts the largest concentration of urban Pashtuns population in the world Some important Pashtun cities of Pakistan include Peshawar, Quetta, Zhob, Loralai, Killa Saifullah,Swat, Mardan, Charsada, Mingora, Bannu, Parachinar, and Swabi. Though the province of Baluchistan is named after the Baloch, Pashtuns are the majority there and the Baloch population is in fact less than Pashtuns in the Balochistan province. However most of the land of Baluchistan is covered by Balochs and Brahuis while Pashtuns are concentrated only in the north of the province.

=== Iran ===
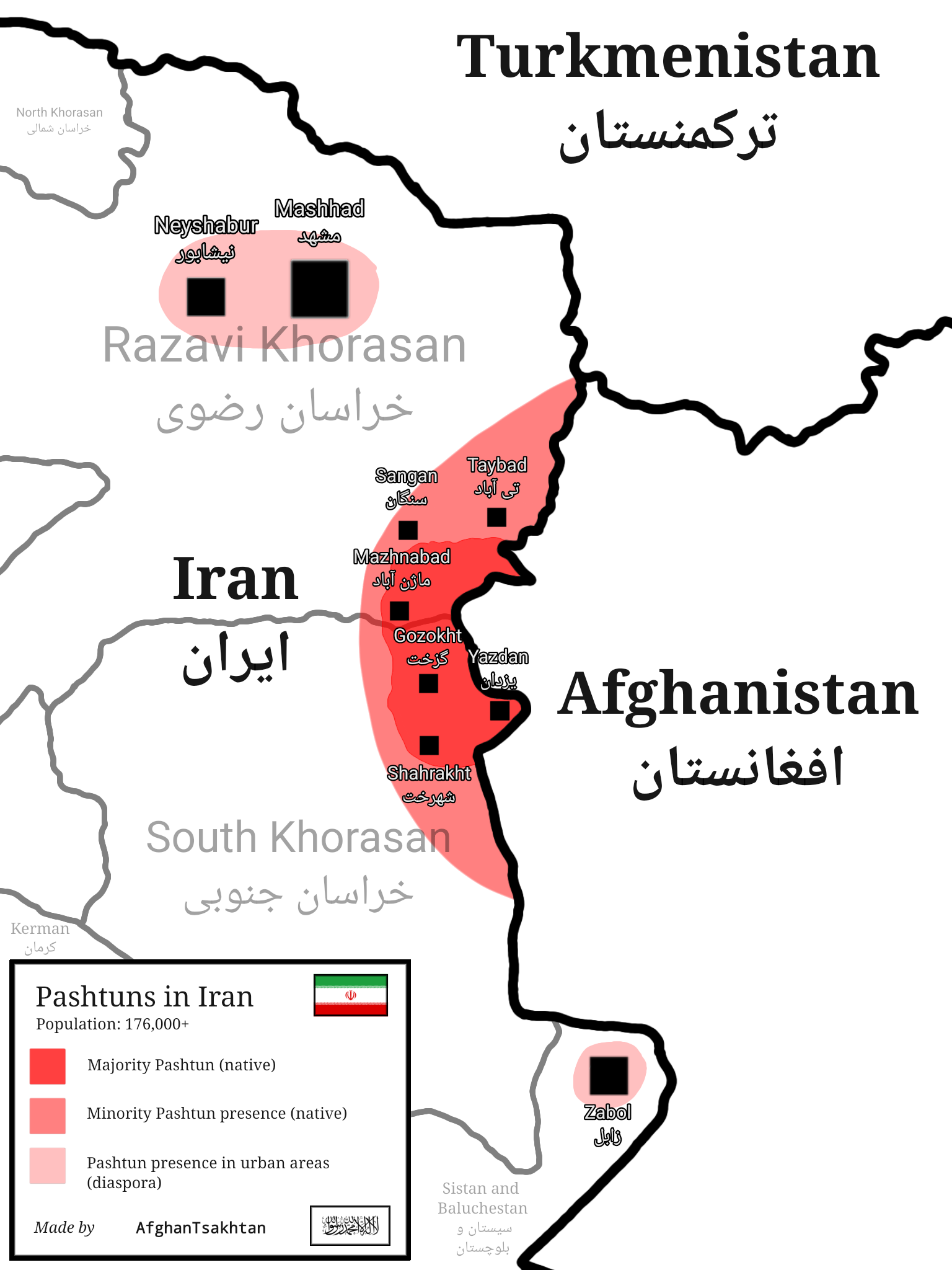
Map of Pashtuns in Iran

Today there are over 2,400,000 Pashtuns living in Iran. In 1993 there were 100,000 Pashtuns living in Iran. The Pashtuns there are mainly concentrated in the Afghan-Iran border, in the Khorasan Province of Iran. The settling of Pashtuns in Iran goes back to the 18th century during the Durrani reign. Timur Shah Durrani, an ethnic Pashtun, the son of Ahmad Shah Durrani and King of Afghanistan, was born in Mashhad, in the Khorasan province of Iran, which was part of the Durrani empire at that time.

Numerous Pashtun tribes have settled in Zabul since the Durrani dynasty. The Pashtun tribes in Zabol from other tribes such as Moradgholi, Kouchakzai, Ghaljaei, lakziyan, Galavi, Barakzai, Khajeali, and Sufi. Regardless of their origins, they are generally seen as Persian zaboli by the society in Iran. The Moradgholi tribe is descended from Amir Shahu Khan Barakzai a member of Barakzai dynasty. The founder of this tribe in Zabul is Murad Khan, the son of Amir Kalan Khan. After him, his son Moradgholi, who also takes the name of the tribe, became the leader. Members of Moradgholi clan also live in Mazandaran, Golestan and other parts of Iran. Kouchakzai is a sub-tribe of the moradgholi clan.

== Minority areas within Khyber Pakhtunkhwa ==
Pashtuns make up a minority of the total population of Hazara Division of Khyber Pakhtunkhwa. Pashtuns are mostly found in Battagram and Torghar District. Pashtun tribes speak Pashto language while Jadoons, Tareens and Dilazaks of Abbottabad and Haripur District speak Hindko language and sometimes Pashto as their second language. Pashtuns also make up a minority of the Chitral district, which is mainly inhabited by Kho and Kalasha people who speak Khowar.

== In North America ==
=== United States ===
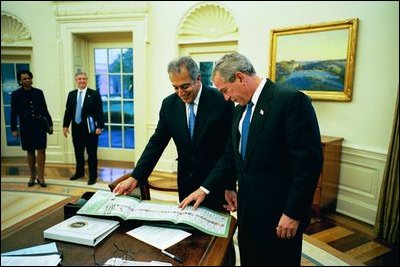
Zalmay Khalilzad with George W. Bush in 2004

In the United States, the first documented presence of Pashtuns first occurred in the 1900s. Following the overthrow of King Zahir Shah of Afghanistan in the 1973 Afghan Republican Coup, the Crown Prince of Afghanistan, Ahmad Shah Khan settled in Virginia. Since the late 1970s and onwards, Pashtuns began immigrating to the United States of America in larger numbers following the Saur Revolution in Afghanistan in 1978. Pashtuns in the United States are famous for running top Afghan cuisine restaurants. The Pashtun diaspora in the United States is the largest Pashtun Diaspora in the west numbering at over 270,000. Zalmay Khalilzad, an ethnic Pashtun from the Noorzai tribe, served as United States ambassador to the United Nations, serving in the role from 2007 to 2009. Khalilzad was the highest ranking Muslim-American in the United States government at the time he left the position. He would later be appointed by Trump to serve as special representative for Afghanistan reconciliation in 2018 and helped broker the US–Taliban deal and facilitating the final United States withdrawal from Afghanistan. In April 2025, Trump appointed member of the Pashtun Barakzai Dynasty, Mary Kabir-Seraj Bischoping as Deputy Assistant Secretary of State for Afghanistan.

=== Canada ===
As of 2021 there are over 31,000 Pashtuns living in Canada

== In The Former Soviet Union ==
=== Russia ===
The Russian Federation is home to around 20,000 Pashtuns. The Pashtun diaspora in Russia largely originated during the 1980s, when thousands of ethnic Pashtuns migrated to the Soviet Union on state-sponsored scholarships to study at universities and military academies. This population expanded significantly into a permanent community after 1992, following the collapse of President Mohammad Najibullah's pro-Soviet government, which prompted an exodus of Pashtun officials, diplomats, and military personnel fleeing political reprisals.

In Russia, Moscow serves as the primary hub for the Pashtun diaspora, housing roughly one-third of the country's Pashtun population.

Outside the capital, a smaller Pashtun community exists in Voronezh. Supported by the state-registered Pashtun Cultural and Business Center "Pashtun", the Voronezh community consists of students, professionals, and small business owners.

On 2 February 2020, one year after Pakistani police beat a Pashtun professor of literature Ibrahim Arman Loni to death, members of the Pashtun diaspora from both Afghanistan and Pakistan held anti-Pakistan rallies in Moscow, Saint Petersburg, Krasnodar, Rostov-on-Don and other Russian demanding that Pakistan cease its crackdown on the Pashtun Protection Movement and release Manzoor Pashteen.

Notable figures of Pashtun descent in Russian politics include former State Duma deputy Darya Mitina, a leftist politician born to a Russian mother and an ethnic Pashtun father, Kasem Iskander Ibrahim Mohammed Yusufzai, who was the son of a former Afghan Prime Minister.

During the War in Donbass and the Russo-Ukrainian War, many Pashtuns fought in the Pro-Russian Vostok Battalion of the Donestk People's Republic and the Russian Armed Forces. Two prominent Pashtun figures in the war are Rafi Jaffar and Mohammad Omar Nasser Rahmanovich. Jaffar's parents, who were part of the PDPA, were killed by the Mujahedeen during the Afghan Civil War. The Soviets took him in and sent him to a Soviet boarding school in the city of Rostov. He joined the Vostok Battalion in 2014 and is known by his comrades as "Abdullah". In 2018, Jaffar lost both legs in a mortar attack. Despite this he continues to serve the DPR and later Russian Military. In May 2023, Russian president Vladimir Putin met with Jaffar via E conference after being told about Jaffar's health. Jaffar currently serves as part of the 51st Donetsk Army, 114th Brigade in the Russian Army. Mohammad Omar Nasser Rahmanovich who goes by the callsign "Pashtun", was born in Kharkiv to a Russian specialist mother and an Afghan doctor father and was featured on Russia Today on a report about drone warfare. Rahmanovich has participated in the conflict since its start in 2014.

== In Europe ==
=== United Kingdom ===
The United Kingdom is home to some 50,000 Pashtuns. Pashtun diaspora in UK have made their presence felt through their restaurants with traditional names like Bab-e-Khyber, Hujra, and Kabuli pulao.

== In Asia ==
=== India ===
The 2011 Indian census found the number of Pashto speakers in the country numbered at 21,677. (Note: Only includes those who speak Pashto as mother tongue.) (Note: A 2018 AJPH estimate places the number of people with distant Pashtun ancestry at 3.2 million. However, the majority of these individuals do not speak Pashto, nor do they actively maintain Pashtun cultural practices. Their claim to Pashtun heritage is based on distant ancestral connections, often tracing back multiple generations, sometimes many centuries ago. Consequently, while these individuals may identify as having Pashtun heritage, their ethnic, cultural and linguistic identity is predominantly Indian, and they do not identify as Pashtun in the contemporary sense of the term.)

Although their exact numbers are hard to determine, they are at least more than 100,000, for it is known that in 1954, over 100,000 nomadic Pakhtuns living in Kashmir Valley were granted Indian citizenship. They still follow their traditional justice system of Jirga. Those settled and living in the Kashmir Valley speak Pashto, and are found chiefly in the southwest of the valley, where Pashtun colonies have been built over time. The Pashtuns chiefly came in under the Durranis, but many were brought by Maharajah Gulab Singh for service on the frontier. Pashto is also spoken in two villages, Dhakki and Changnar (Chaknot), located on the Line of Control in Kupwara district.

Small, scattered Pashtun population still exists in some major cities of India with large Muslim populations, with the majority of Pashto-speaking individuals residing in the states of Delhi and Uttar Pradesh India; who also have adopted local languages of the respective areas they live in, as their second language. These Pashtuns, numbering around 14,161, have retained the use of the Pashto language and are still able to speak and understand it.

=== Gulf States ===
Large numbers of Pashtuns from Pakistan's North-West Frontier Province and the Afghan borderlands migrated to the Persian Gulf following the oil boom of the 1970s. Pashtun migrants were particularly prominent in the United Arab Emirates and other Gulf states, where they worked in occupations including construction and transport.

The scale of historical Pashtun migration to the Gulf is difficult to determine precisely because available Pakistani migration statistics generally do not record migrants by ethnicity. Official statistics nevertheless show a sharp increase in Pakistani labour migration during this period: 153,081 Pakistani workers were recorded as leaving for overseas employment in 1981 alone.

== See also ==
- Pashtun culture
- Pashtun people
- Pashtun tribes
- Pashtunistan

== Bibliography ==
- Ahmad, Aisha; Roger Boase. Pashtun Tales from the Pakistan-Afghan Frontier: From the Pakistan-Afghan Frontier. Saqi Books, 2003. ISBN 0-86356-438-0.
- Ahmed, Akbar S. 1976. Millennium and charisma among Pathans: a critical essay in social anthropology. Routledge & Kegan Paul, 1980. ISBN 0-7100-0547-4.
- Ahmed, Akbar S. Pukhtun economy and society: traditional structure and economic development in a tribal society. Routledge & Kegan Paul, 1980. ISBN 0-7100-0389-7.
- Caroe, Olaf. The Pathans: 500 B.C.-A.D. 1957. MacMillan, 1964. ISBN 0-19-577221-0.
- Dani, Ahmad Hasan. Peshawar: Historic city of the Frontier. Khyber Mail Press, 1969. ISBN 969-35-0554-9.
- Docherty, Paddy. The Khyber Pass: A History of Empire and Invasion. Union Square Press, 2008. ISBN 0-571-21977-2.
- Dupree, Louis. Afghanistan. Princeton University Press, 1973. ISBN 0-691-03006-5.
- Elphinstone, Mountstuart (1815). An account of the kingdom of Caubul, and its dependencies in Persia, Tartary, and India: comprising a view of the Afghaun nation, and a history of the Dooraunee monarchy. Longman, Hurst, Rees, Orme and Brown, 1815.
- Habibi, Abdul Hai. Afghanistan: An Abridged History. Fenestra Books, 2003. ISBN 1-58736-169-8.
- Hopkirk, Peter. The Great Game: the struggle for empire in central Asia Kodansha Globe; Reprint edition. Kodansha International, 1994. ISBN 1-56836-022-3.
- Nichols, Robert. A history of Pashtun migration, 1775–2006. Oxford University Press, 2008. ISBN 0-19-547600-X.
- Vogelsang, Willem. The Afghans. Wiley-Blackwell, 2002. ISBN 0-631-19841-5.
- Wardak, Ali. Jirga – A Traditional Mechanism of Conflict Resolution in Afghanistan , 2003, online at UNPAN (the United Nations Online Network in Public Administration and Finance).
- Weiner, Myron; Ali Banuazizi. The Politics of social transformation in Afghanistan, Iran, and Pakistan. Syracuse University Press, 1994. ISBN 0-8156-2609-6.
- Weinreich, Matthias. "We are here to stay": Pashtun migrants in the Northern Areas of Pakistan. Klaus Schwarz, 2009. ISBN 3-87997-356-3.
