= Sarod =

Indian musical instrument

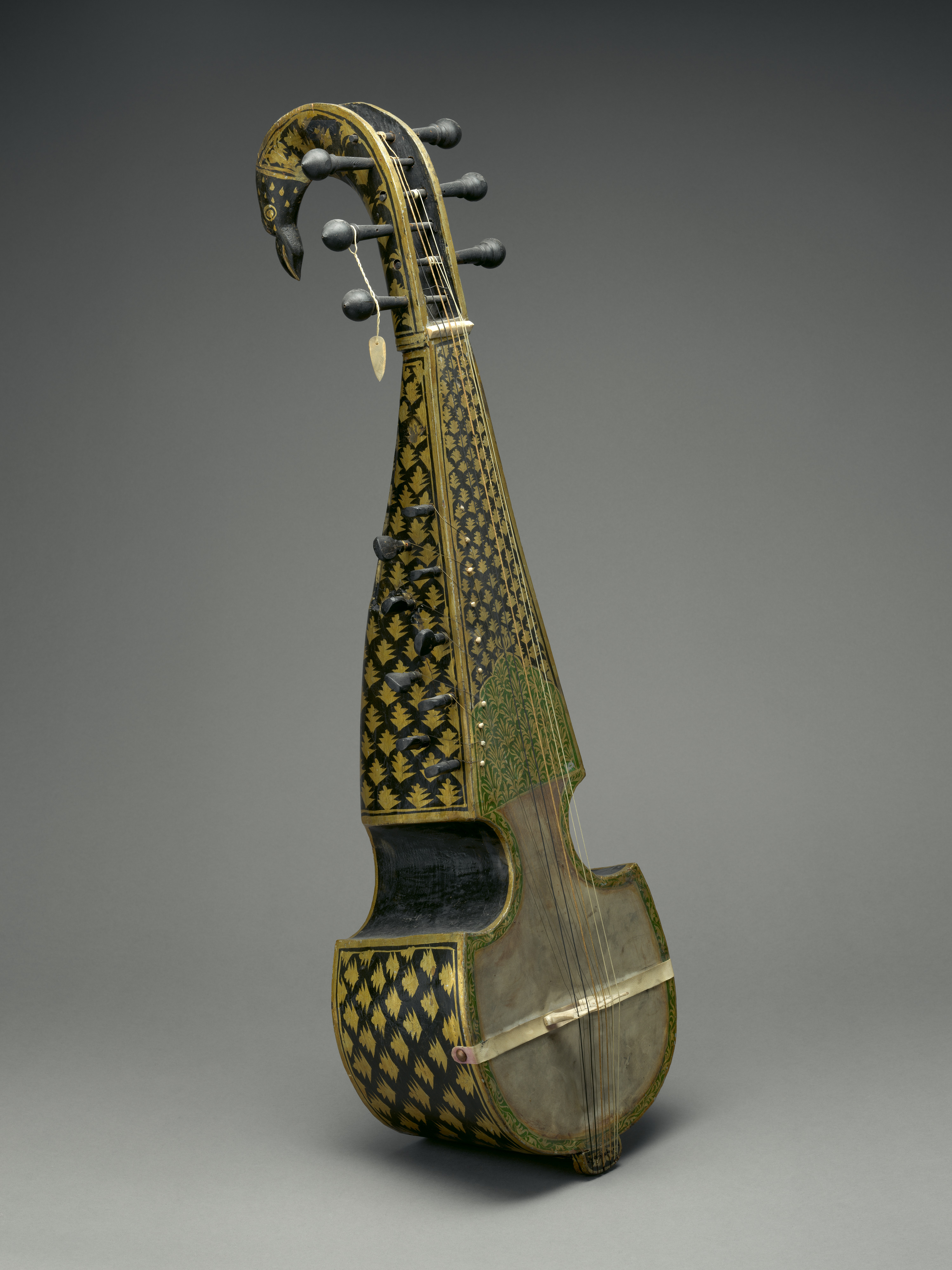
A 19th century sarod, at the Metropolitan Museum of Art.

The sarod is a plucked lute used in Hindustani music on the Indian subcontinent. Along with the sitar, it is among the most popular and prominent instruments. It is known for a deep, weighty, introspective sound, in contrast with the sweet, overtone-rich timbre of the sitar, with sympathetic strings that give it a resonant, reverberant quality. A fretless instrument, it can produce the continuous slides between notes known as meend (portamento), which are important in Indian music. Historically known by the alternative name Sardiya Veena, its origin is unclear with scholars tracing it to Indian Saradiya Veena, Swaravat or Rabab.

== Origins ==
The origin of the sarod is unclear with multiple origins. Scholars trace it to have been evolved from ancient form of (Indian) SaradiyaVeena, South Indian plucked stringed instrument Saravat or Swaravat or sahrud (now known as Rabab).

The sarod has been also historically called and known by the name "Saradiya veena". Further, Tagore states that the Arabic rabab (also called the Afghan rubab) is physically smaller than the Indian rabab.

The word sarod may have been introduced from Persia during the late Mughal Empire. It can be traced back to sorūd meaning "song", "melody", or "hymn", and further to the Persian verb sorūdan, which means "to sing", "to play a musical instrument", or "to compose".

According to Oxford English dictionary, the earliest use of the word "Sarod" as a noun is from 1860s and is borrowed from Hindi.

Alternatively, the shahrud may have given its name to the sarod. The Persian word šāh-rūd is made up of šāh (shah or king) and rūd (string).

The sarod may have also emerged in India during the early 19th century as an evolved form of the Afghan rubāb, commonly played in the regions to the east of Delhi, inhabited by Pathan communities. In the latter half of the 19th century, virtuosic rubab musicians endowed the instrument with metal strings and a metallic plate, elements that are characteristic of the contemporary sarod. These enhancements facilitated longer-lasting notes and the ability to execute the intricate embellishments characteristic of dhrupad and khyal styles of music.

The sarod in its present form dates back definitively to the 1850s, when it started gaining recognition as a serious instrument in Rewa, Shahjahanpur, Gwalior and Lucknow. Among the many conflicting and contested histories of the sarod, there is one that attributes its invention to the ancestors of the present-day sarod maestro, Amjad Ali Khan. Amjad Ali Khan's ancestor Mohammad Hashmi Khan Bangash, a musician and horse trader, came to India with the Afghan rubab in the mid-18th century, and became a court musician to the Maharajah of Rewa (now in Madhya Pradesh). It is claimed that it was his descendants, notably his grandson Ghulam Ali Khan Bangash, a court musician in Gwalior, who changed the rubab into the sarod we know today. However, this claim only began to gain traction after the passing of Sakhawat Hussain Khan, of the Lucknow-Shahjahanpur Gharana, in 1955. Recent scholarship, corroborated by Bengali musicologist Sourindra Mohan Tagore (1840–1914), credits Sakhawat Hussain Khan's maternal grandfather, Niamatullah Khan of Lucknow, with the same innovation. He was a rubab player amongst the company of musicians in Wajid Ali Shah's Lucknow court. In order to acquire the musical knowledge of his Senia ustads, Basat Khan and Pyar Khan, while retaining his virtuosic rubab technique, he stripped the rubab of its frets, attaching an iron plate and changing the gut strings for metal strings. The modification process began in Lucknow in 1855 and continued in Metyaburj, Kolkata in 1856. The lineage of Niamatullah Khan is survived today by Irfan Muhammad Khan, head, or 'khalifa', of the Lucknow-Shahjahanpur Gharana.

In the 20th century, the sarod was significantly modified by Allauddin Khan and his brother Ayet Ali Khan. They increased the number of chikari (drone) strings and increased the number of tarafdar (sympathetic) strings. However, as is the case with most young, evolving instruments, much work remains to be done in the area of sarod luthiery in order to achieve reliable customization, and precise replication of successful instruments. This reflects the general state of Indian instrument-making in the present day. Although the sarod has been referred to as a "bass rubab" its tonal bandwidth is actually considerably greater than that of the rubab, especially in the middle and high registers

== Design ==
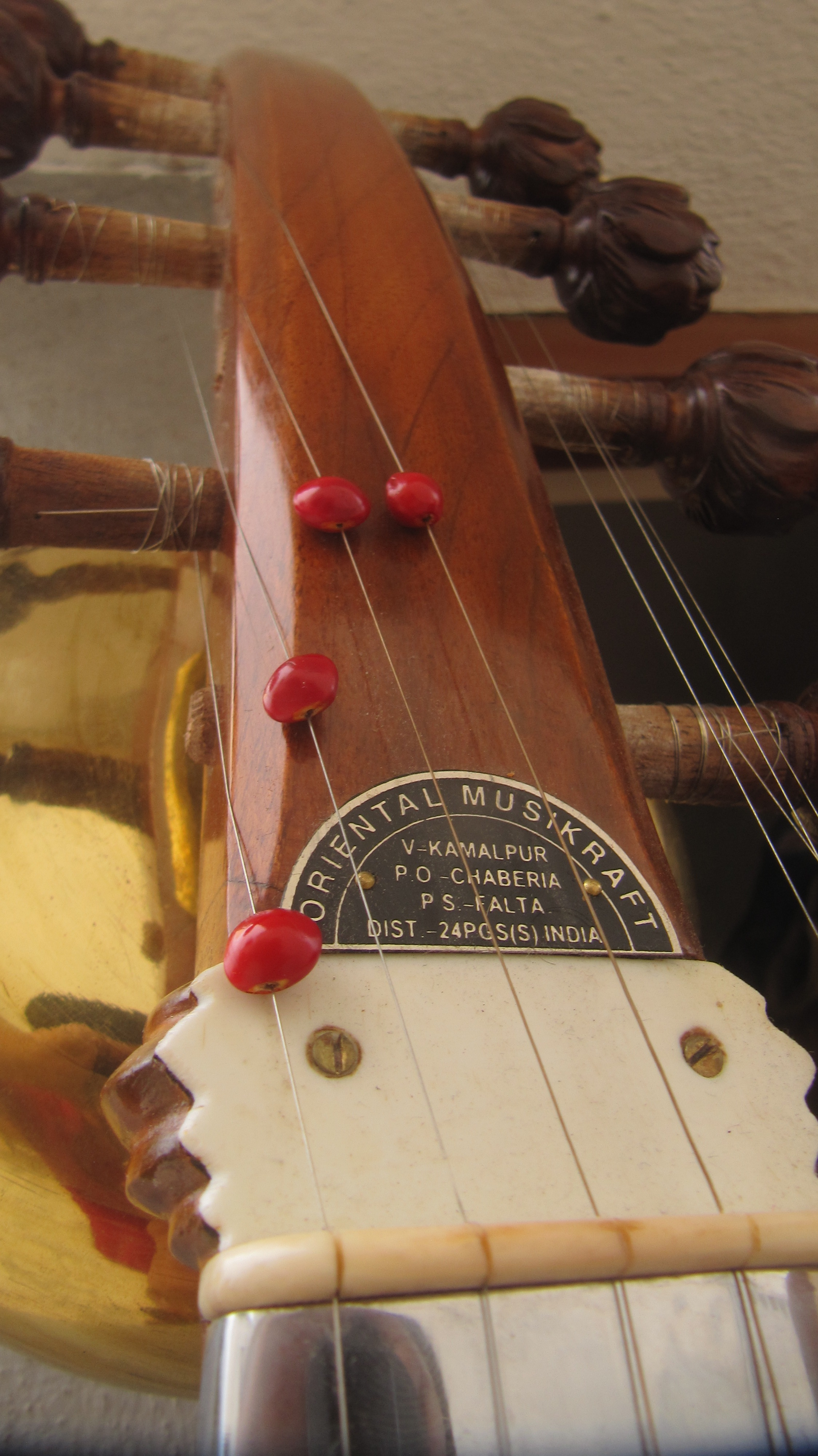
Sarod micro tuners

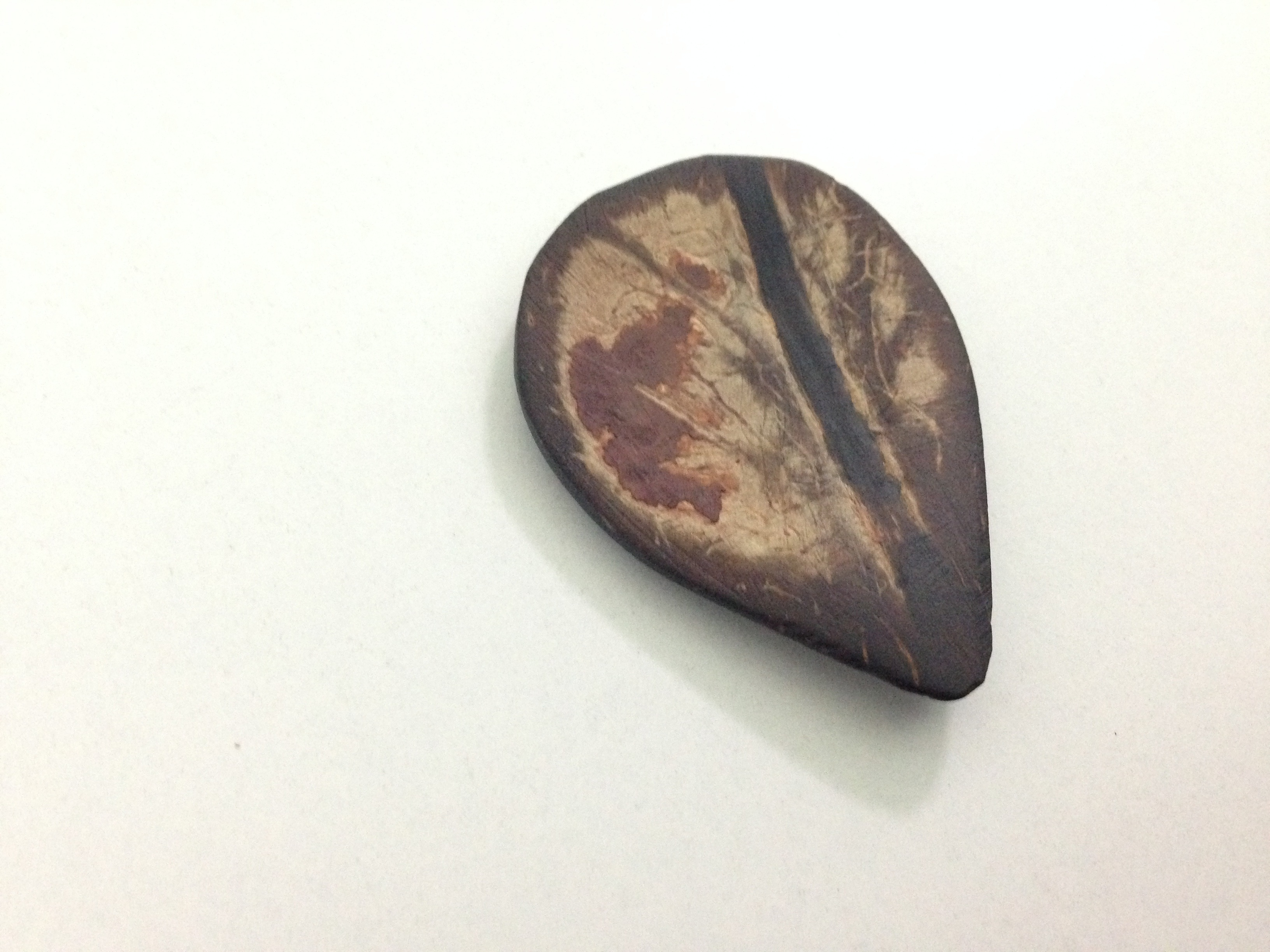
A traditional hand crafted coconut shell sarod plectrum, also known as a Javva

The design of the instrument depends on the school (gharana) of playing. There are three distinguishable types:

The conventional sarod is a 17 to 25-stringed lute-like instrument—four to five main strings used for playing the melody, one or two drone strings, two chikari strings and nine to eleven sympathetic strings. The design of this early model is generally credited to Niyamatullah Khan of the Lucknow Gharana as well as Ghulam Ali Khan of the Gwalior-Bangash Gharana. Among the contemporary sarod players, this basic design is kept intact by two streams of sarod playing. Amjad Ali Khan and his disciples play this model, as do the followers of Radhika Mohan Maitra. Both Amjad Ali Khan and Buddhadev Dasgupta have introduced minor changes to their respective instruments which have become the design templates for their followers. Both musicians use sarods made of teak wood, and a soundboard made of goat skin stretched across the face of the resonator. Buddhadev Dasgupta prefers a polished stainless steel fingerboard for the ease of maintenance while Amjad Ali Khan uses the conventional chrome or nickel-plated cast steel fingerboard. Visually, the two variants are similar, with six pegs in the main pegbox, two rounded chikari pegs and 11 (Amjad) to 15 (Buddhadev) sympathetic strings. The descendants of Niyamatullah Khan (namely Irfan Khan and Ghulfam Khan) also play similar instruments. Some of the followers of Radhika Mohan Maitra still carry the second resonator on their sarods. Amjad Ali Khan and his followers have rejected the resonator altogether. These instruments are typically tuned to B, which is the traditional setting.

Another type is that designed by Allauddin Khan and his brother Ayet Ali Khan. This instrument, referred to by David Trasoff as the 1934 Maihar Prototype, is larger and longer than the conventional instrument, though the fingerboard is identical to the traditional sarod. This instrument has 25 strings in all. These include four main strings, four jod strings (tuned to Ni or Dha, R/r, G/g and Sa respectively), two chikari strings (tuned to Sa of the upper octave) and fifteen tarab strings. The main strings are tuned to Ma ("fa"), Sa ("do"), lower Pa ("so") and lower Sa, giving the instrument a range of three octaves. The Maihar sarod lends itself extremely well to the presentation of alap with the four jod strings providing a backdrop for the ambiance of the raga. This variant is, however, not conducive to the performance of clean right-hand picking on individual strings. The instrument is typically tuned to C.

Sarod strings are either made of steel or phosphor bronze. Most contemporary sarod players use German or American-made strings, such as Roslau (Germany), Pyramid (Germany) and Precision (USA). The strings are plucked with a triangular plectrum (java) made of polished coconut shell, ebony, cocobolo wood, horn, cowbone, Delrin or other such materials. Early sarod players used plain wire plectrums, which yielded a soft, ringing tone.

== Playing technique ==
The lack of frets and the tension of the strings make the sarod a very demanding instrument to play, as the strings must be pressed hard against the fingerboard.

There are two approaches to stopping the strings of the sarod. One involves using the tip of one's fingernails to stop the strings, and the other uses a combination of the nail and the fingertip to stop the strings against the fingerboard.

Fingering techniques and how they are taught depends largely on the personal preferences of musicians rather than on the basis of school affiliation. Radhika Mohan Maitra, for example, used the index, middle and ring finger of his left hand to stop the string, just like followers of Allauddin Khan do. Maitra, however, made much more extensive use of the third fingernail for slides and hammers. Amjad Ali Khan, while a member of approximately the same stylistic school as Radhika Mohan, prefers to use just the index and middle fingers of his left hand. Amjad Ali is, however, pictured circa 1960 playing with all three fingers.

== Notable sarodiyas ==
=== Deceased ===
- Niamatullah Khan (1804–1904)
- Enayet Ali Khan (1790–1889)
- Shefayet Khan (1838–1915)
- Karamatullah Khan (sarodia) (1848–1933)
- Asadullah Khan ('Kaukab') (1852–1915)
- Fida Hussain Khan (1855–1927)
- Mohammad Amir Khan (1873–1934), Court Musician of Darbhanga and Rajshahi

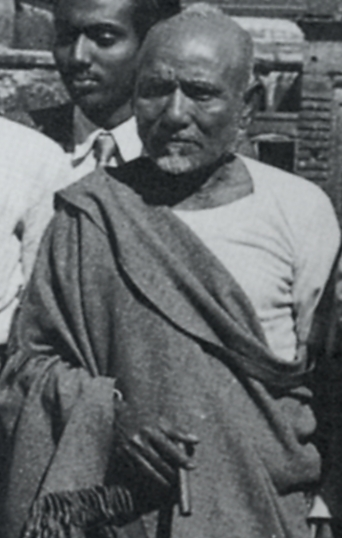
Allauddin Khan

- Allauddin Khan (1862(1882?)–1972)
- Sakhawat Hussain Khan (1877–1955)
- Hafiz Ali Khan (1888–1972)
- Umar Khan (1916–1982)
- Radhika Mohan Maitra (1917-1981)
- Ali Akbar Khan (1922–2009)
- Jotin Bhattacharya (1926–2016)
- Bahadur Khan (1931–1989)
- Buddhadev Das Gupta (1933–2018)
- Dhyanesh Khan (1942–1990)
- Kalyan Mukherjea (1943–2010)
- Sakhawat Hussain (1877–1955)
- Sharan Rani Backliwal (1929–2008)
- Vasant Rai (1942–1985)
- Rajeev Taranath (1932 - 2024)
- Shahadat Hossain Khan (1958–2020)
- Aashish Khan (1939-2024)

=== Living ===
- Amjad Ali Khan (b. 1945)
- Irfan Muhammad Khan (b. 1954)
- Brij Narayan (b. 1952)
- Narendra Nath Dhar (b. 1954)
- Biswajit Roy Chowdhury (b. 1956)
- Vikash Maharaj (b.1957)
- Tejendra Majumdar (b. 1961)
- Amaan Ali Khan (b. 1977)
- Ayaan Ali Khan (b. 1979)
- Joydeep Mukherjee (musician) (b. 1982)
- Abhisek Lahiri (b. 1983)
- Wajahat Khan
- Arnab Chakrabarty (b. 1980)
- Soumik Datta (b. 1983)
- Aayush Mohan (b. 1995)
- Apratim Majumdar
- Kaushik Mukherjee
- SuraRanjan Mukherjee
- Vishal Maharaj (b.1986)
- Rajeeb Chakraborty (b.1963)
- Shiraz Ali Khan
- Prattyush Banerjee (b.1969)
- Rajrupa Chowdhury

== See also ==
- Hindustani classical music
- Music of India
- Plucked string instrument
- String instruments
