= Sakhawat Hussain =

Ustad Sakhawat Hussain Khan or Sakhawat Hussain (1877–1955) was a virtuoso Indian sarod player, a contemporary of Hafiz Ali Khan and one of the major exponents of the instrument in the 20th century.

Sakhawat Hussain was the descendant of Bangash Pathans, who had originally come from Afghanistan to perform military service for the Mughal court in the early 18th century. He began musical training under his father, Ustad Shafayet Khan, but after marrying the daughter of the famous sarodiya Asadullah 'Kaukab' Khan became a formal follower of the Lucknow - Bulandshahr sarod gharana. This tradition had roots in Afghan rubab playing and was heavily influenced by the dhrupad vocal genre.

From 1926, he became Professor of Sarod at the Bhatkhande Music Institute after his performances impressed Vishnu Narayan Bhatkhande. He played for a time in the orchestra of Leila Sokhey ("Madame Menaka"), who founded the Menaka Indian Ballet Company. He toured Europe with Menaka in the period 1935-8 and gave many recitals (including several at the Berlin Olympics' International Dance Olympiad, having the curious distinction of having performed for both Stalin and Hitler). He was also responsible for identifying the talent of singer Begum Akhtar and encouraging her early training. He continued teaching at the Bhatkhande Institute until his death in 1955.

Sakhawat Hussain's 1920s recordings are among the very few that survive of sarodiyas in that period, and demonstrate both a strong influence of the tarana structure and a particular emphasis on right-hand technique, common to players of the Lucknow-Bulandshahr gharana, which appears to be derived from rubab traditions.
