= Aayush Mohan =

Indian Sarod player

- Also known as: Aayush Mohan Gupta
- Born: 20 March 1995 (age 31)
- Origin: New Delhi, India
- Genre: Indian classical music
- Occupation: Sarod Player
- Instrument: Sarod
- Years active: 2009 – present
- Website: www.aayushmohan.com

Aayush Mohan is an Indian Classical Musician who plays the Sarod. He performs in the style of Maihar Gharana of Hindustani Classical Music. He is a four-time TEDx speaker and has worked towards creating cultural awareness in India. He frequently performs Jugalbandi(duet) with his brother Lakshay Mohan who is a Sitar player and the two are known as Mohan Brothers. Aayush Mohan and Lakshay Mohan are the first Indians to be invited to perform at the Grammy Museum, Los Angeles for the opening of the exhibition 'Ravi Shankar : A Life in Music'.

== Performing career ==
Aayush began performing in 2009 as a soloist and in duets with his brother sitarist Lakshay Mohan. After listening to the Jugalbandi of Aayush Mohan & Lakshay Mohan in 2012, Pandit Ravi Shankar decided to launch them in the USA under his foundation.

Notable performances :

- Grammy Museum at L.A. Live, Los Angeles
- Royal Festival Hall, London
- Symphony Space, New York City
- Berklee College, Boston
- David & Dorothea Garfield Theatre, San Diego
- The Egg, Albany
- Learnquest Music Conference Boston
- Abbey Theater, Dublin
- Central Conservatory of Music, China

Reviewing his performance with his brother in July 2012 at the Kamani Auditorium Delhi, The Hindu wrote: "They chose Miyan Ki Malhar to present alap, jod and jhala and impressed with their serious musical attitude and no-nonsense approach. Their treatment of the raga showed maturity and the kanhda component was accorded due importance with its trade mark avrohatmak andolit Komal Gandhar."

In October 2013, Aayush collaborated with Grammy Award Winner Pt Vishwa Mohan Bhatt for "The String Trinity " concert at Kamani Auditorium, New Delhi in a trio which also had his brother Lakshay Mohan on the Sitar.

By 2015, Aayush had performed in many prominent classical music festivals across India including All Bengal Music Conference 2011 Kolkata, Gunidas Sangeet Sammelan Mumbai, Saptak Music Festival Ahmedabad, Ganga Mahotsav Varanasi, Taj Mahotsav Agra

He won significant critical acclaim for his performance at the Sawai Gandharv Festival in Pune

In 2016 Aayush collaborated with Grammy Winning cellist Barry Phillips and sitarist Lakshay Mohan for The Golden Symphony Project that toured India.

Aayush Mohan performed at the Royal Festival Hall, Southbank Centre London for "The Ravi Shankar centenary" concert with Anoushka Shankar and other musicians on 5 March 2022.

== Television ==
Aayush has appeared on prominent television shows including the Good Day New York Show on FOX5, New York; The Nine Show on FOX2, Detroit and Insync Television.

== Discography ==
Echoes from the Yellow Land (2013) by Times Music Aayush Mohan & Lakshay Mohan | Sitar and Sarod Duet | Ragas Mand, Charukeshi, Manj Khamaj, Patdeep, Zila Kafi, Bageshree, Marwa, Kirwani

The Majestic Court (2014) by Times Music Aayush Mohan - Sarod & Lakshay Mohan - Sitar | Raga Shree - Alaap, Jor and Jhala | Raga Shree - Composition in Dhamaar | Raga Bhairavi - Gat in Sooltaal

The Hidden Harmony (2016) The album "The Hidden Harmony" was nominated for the Best Classical Instrumental album at Global Indian Music Academy Awards 2016
