= Subhra Guha =

- Born: 1956 (age 68–69)
- Origin: Kolkata, India
- Genres: Hindustani classical music, Semi classical music, Thumri
- Occupation: Vocalist
- Years active: 1968–present

Subhra Guha (born 1956) is a vocalist in the Hindustani classical music tradition from the Agra gharana style of singing. Her repertoire covers khyals, thumri and dadra.

== Biography ==
Subhra Guha was born in Calcutta in 1956. Her family encouraged her to pursue Hindustani classical music, as she showed talent in music from a young age. Initially, she learnt music under Satish Bhowmick. From 1970, she trained in singing in Agra gharana style under Sunil Bose. From 1982, for ten years, she was a student at the ITC Sangeet Research Academy in Kolkata where she was taught by K. G. Ginde and Bhowmick. She learned thumri rendition from Dhruvatara Joshi. In spite of the macho nature of the Agra gharana style of music, with her own sense of layakari (rhythmic play) and strong tone, she became proficient by creating her own style of gayaki under the guidance of Vijay Kichlu, director of the academy. She joined the academy as guru and taught between 1992 and 2003 and again in recent years. She is the only woman student of the Academy to be appointed as a guru in the same institution.

Guha has performed in many concerts nationally and also in the US, Europe, and Asia. She has recorded albums for His Master's Voice and many other recording companies. She recorded playback music for Goutam Ghose's film, Yatra. She performs regularly on All India Radio and Doordarshan. She is also known for her Poorab Ang renditions of thumri.

== Awards ==
In 2015, Guha received the Girija Shankar Smriti Puruskar award from the Government of West Bengal.
