= All India Pakhtoon Jirga-e-Hind =

The All India Pakhtoon Jirga-e-Hind (Pashto: آل انډیا پښتون جرګه هند , Urdu: آل انڈیا پشتون جرگہ ہند), commonly known as the Jirga-e-Hind (Pashto: جرګه هند , Urdu: جرگہ ہند), is an organisation representing the interests of Pashtuns in India. It is chaired by Yasmin Nigar Khan.

== Activities ==
The All India Pakthoon Jirga-e-Hind seeks to provide 3,200,000 Pashtuns living and working within the Republic of India with Indian citizenship. It appeals to an agreement made between Abdul Ghaffar Khan and Jawaharlal Nehru that would enable Pashtuns who wished to stay in India after its partition to do so; Abdul Ghaffar Khan and the Khudai Khidmatgar had strongly opposed the partition of India.

The organisation wishes to see the creation of two universities in Delhi and Calcutta in honour of Indian independence movement activist Abdul Ghaffar Khan. These universities would provide an education for the Pashtuns of Afghanistan who wish to study in India, although others would receive admission as well.

The All India Pakthoon Jirga-e-Hind has advocated for the merger of the North West Frontier Province in Pakistan with the country of Afghanistan. It argues that the NWFP was leased to the British for one hundred years by Afghanistan and so it should be returned to Afghanistan.

== See also ==
- All India Azad Muslim Conference
