= Dhirdan =

- Village
- Location in Rajasthan, India
- Coordinates: 28°34′24″N 73°58′30″E
- Country: India
- State: Rajasthan
- District: Bikaner
- Tehsil: Lunkaransar

Government
  - Body: Gram panchayat
- ISO 3166 code: RJ-IN

Dhirdan is a village in Lunkaransar tehsil of Bikaner district in Rajasthan, India. Village is known for Baba Sheikh Farid's Chilla.
