= Baba Farid =

Punjabi Muslim preacher and mystic (c. 1188 – 1266)

Khawaja; Ganjshakar; Baba Farid
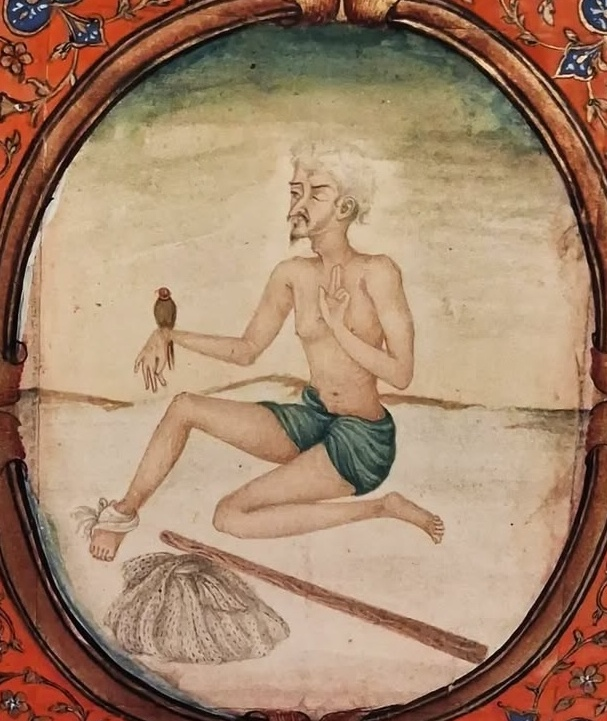
- Painting of Sheikh Fareed Shakarganj, ca.1823–24 [1239 A.H.], Alwar School of Art.

Sheikh Farid Shakarganj
- Born: Farīd ad-Dīn Ganj-i-Shakar فریدالدین گنج شکر c. 4 April 1188; Kothewal, Multan, Punjab, Ghurid Sultanate (present-day Punjab, Pakistan)
- Died: c. 7 May 1266 (aged 78); Pakpattan, Punjab, Delhi Sultanate (present-day Punjab, Pakistan)
- Venerated in: Sunni Islam, Sufism
- Major shrine: Shrine of Baba Farid, Pakpattan, Punjab, Pakistan
- Influences: Qutbuddin Bakhtiar Kaki
- Influenced: Many, most prominent being Nizamuddin Auliya, Jamal-ud-Din Hansvi and Alauddin Sabir Kaliyari, Adam Sufi.

Baba Farid
- Punjabi language
- Gurmukhi: ਫ਼ਰੀਦ-ਉਦ-ਦੀਨ ਮਸੂਦ ਗੰਜਸ਼ਕਰ
- Transliteration: farīd-ud-dīn masūd gañjśakar
- Shahmukhi: فرید الدین مسعود گنج شکر
- Transliteration: farīd aldīn masʻūd ganj śakar
- IPA: [fəɾiː.d̪ʊd̪ː.iːnᵊ məsuːd̪ᵊ ɡənd͡ʒᵊ ʃəkːəɾᵊ]

Farīduddīn Masūd Ganjshakar (c. 4 April 1188 – 7 May 1266), commonly known as Bābā Farīd or Sheikh Farīd (also in Anglicised spelling Fareed, Fareed ud-Deen, Masood, etc.), was a 12th-13th century Punjabi Muslim mystic, poet, and preacher. Revered by Hindus, Muslims and Sikhs alike, he remains one of the most revered Muslim mystics of South Asia during the Islamic Golden Age.

== Biography ==
Bābā Farīd was born in 1188 (573 AH) in Kothewal, 10 km from Multan in the Punjab region, to Jamāl-ud-dīn Suleimān and Maryam Bībī (Qarsum Bībī), daughter of Wajīh-ud-dīn Khojendī. Another source claims he was born in 1173. His family had immigrated to the Indus Valley from Kabul in modern-day Afghanistan during the time of his grandfather. He received his early education at Multan, which had become a centre for Muslim education. There he met his teacher Khwaja Qutbuddin Bakhtiar Kaki, who was passing through Multan on his way from Baghdad to Delhi.

Once his education was over, he moved to Delhi, where he learned the Islamic doctrine from his master, Khwaja Qutbuddin Bakhtiar Kaki. He later moved to Hansi, Haryana. When Khwaja Bakhtiyār Kākī died in 1235, Farīd left Hansi and became his spiritual successor and instead of settling in Delhi, he returned to his native Punjab and settled in Ajodhan (present-day Pakpattan, Punjab, Pakistan). He was one of the founding fathers of the Chishti Sufi order.

Fariduddin Ganjshakar's shrine darbār is located in Pakpattan, Punjab, Pakistan.

== Poetry ==
Baba Farid was the first major Punjabi poet. A section of his poetry is as follows:

Farīdā jo taīN mārani mukīāN tinhāN na mārē ghumm
Farīdā jā lab thā nēhu kiā lab ta kūṛhā nēhu
Kālē maiḍē kapṛē, kālā maiḍā wais,
GunahīN bhariyā maiN phirāN, Lōk kahaiN darvēsh
GallīN cikkaṛ dūr ghar, nāḷ piyārē nīNh,
ChallāN tē bhijjē kamblī, rahāN tāN ṭuṭṭē nīNh.
Roti meri kāṭh di, lawan meri bhukh
Jihna khaadi chopadi, ghane sehensi dukh

Translation:

Fareed, do not turn around and strike those who strike you with their fists.
Fareed, when there is greed, what love can there be? When there is greed, love is false.
Laden with my load of misdeeds, I move about in the garb of black garments.
And the people see me and call me a dervish.
My promise to my love, a long way to go and a muddy lane ahead
If I move I spoil my cloak; if I stay I break my word.
My bread is of wood, which is enough to quench my hunger,
But the one who feasts on buttered breads will eventually suffer

As per Jagtar Singh Grewal, Farid composed his works in his native Multani dialect of Punjabi.

It is uncertain if the verses attributed to Farid in the Sikh scripture refers to Fariduddin Ganjshakar. According to Bhardwaj (2016), the language of the verses more closely resembles a later stage of Punjabi, leading credence to the theory that these verses were originally authored by the 11th successor of Farid's spiritual lineage named Ibrahim Farid (also known as Farid Sani, "Farid the Second"), who died in Sirhind in 1552 and had disciples spread across Punjab and Delhi. According to this alternative view, Guru Nanak lived during the period of this Farid and perhaps procured the verses which were originally authored by Ibrahim Farid during a meeting between the two. Another theory is that the verses found in the Guru Granth Sahib attributed to Farid are ultimately originally traceable to Fariduddin Ganjshakar but that successive generations of his spiritual lineage altered the language of the verses to keep them understandable to the common population owing to linguistic evolution and change across generations.

== Mausoleum ==
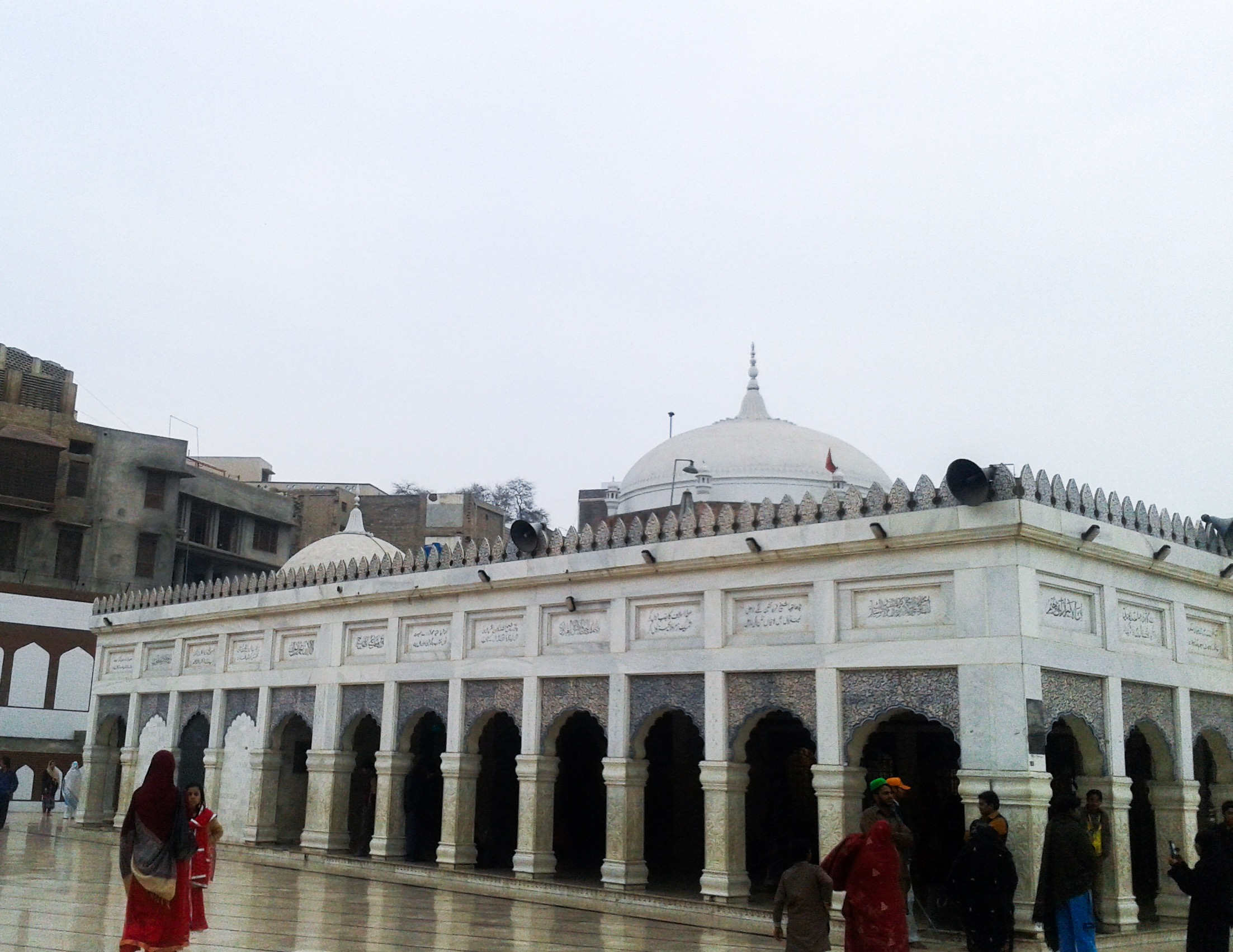
The shrine of Baba Farid in Pakpatan

The small Shrine of Baba Farid is made of white marble with two doors, one facing east and called the Nūrī Darwāza or 'Gate of Light', and the second facing north called Bahishtī Darwāza, or 'Gate of Paradise'. There is also a long covered corridor. Inside the tomb are two white marbled graves. One is Baba Farid's, and the other is his elder son's. These graves are always covered by sheets of cloth called Chaddars' (the green coloured chaddars are covered with Islamic verses), and flowers that are brought by visitors. The space inside the tomb is limited; not more than ten people can be inside at one time. Women are not allowed inside the tomb, but the late Benazir Bhutto, then Prime Minister of Pakistan, was permitted to enter inside by the shrine guardians, when she visited the shrine. Another rare exceptional case was the late Hajjah Kainz Hussain of Jhelum, wife of the late Haji Manzoor Hussain, who was allowed inside the tomb and was given a Chaddar.

Charity food called Langar is distributed all day to visitors here and the Auqaf Department, which administers the shrine. The shrine is open all day and night for visitors. The shrine has its own huge electricity generator that is used whenever there is power cut or loadshedding, so the shrine remains bright all night, all year round. There is no separation of male and female areas but a small female area is also available. There is a big new mosque in the shrine. Thousands of people daily visit the shrine for their wishes and unresolvable matters; for this they vow to give to some charity when their wishes or problems are resolved. When their matters are solved they bring charity food for visitors and the poor, and drop money in big money boxes that are kept for this purpose. This money is collected by the Auqaf Department of the Government of Pakistan that looks after the shrine.

On 25 October 2010, a bomb exploded outside the gates of the shrine, killing six people.

== Baba Farid's Serai in Jerusalem ==
In Jerusalem, there is a place called Al-Hindi Serai or Indian hospice (Indian lodge or shrine), where it is claimed Baba Farid lived for many years in the early 13th century, almost 800 years ago. Baba Farid walked into Jerusalem around the year 1200, little more than a decade after the armies of Saladin had forced the Crusaders out of Jerusalem. The place is now a pilgrim lodge for people of the Indian sub-continent. It is claimed that this building is currently cared for by the 94-year-old caretaker, Muhammad Munir Ansari, in 2014. "No one knows how long Baba Farid stayed in the city. But long after he had returned to the Punjab, where he eventually became head of the Chishti order, Indian Muslims passing through Jerusalem on their way to Mecca wanted to pray where he had prayed, to sleep where he had slept. Slowly, a shrine and pilgrim lodge, the Indian Hospice, formed around the memory of Baba Farid." "Later accounts of his life said that he spent his days sweeping the stone floors around Al-Aqsa Mosque, or fasting in the silence of a cave inside the city walls."

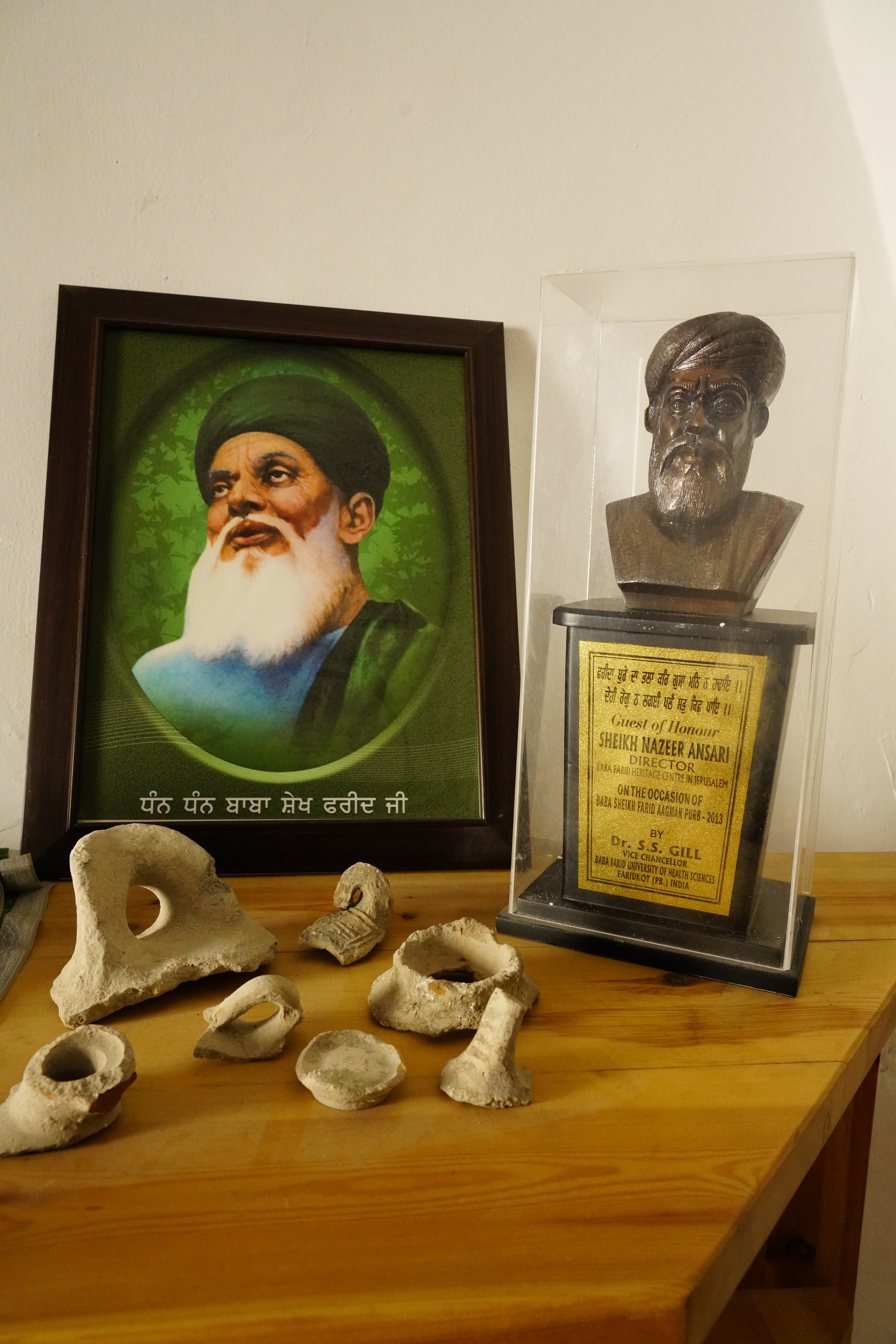
Portrait of Baba Farid at Indian hospice, Jerusalem.

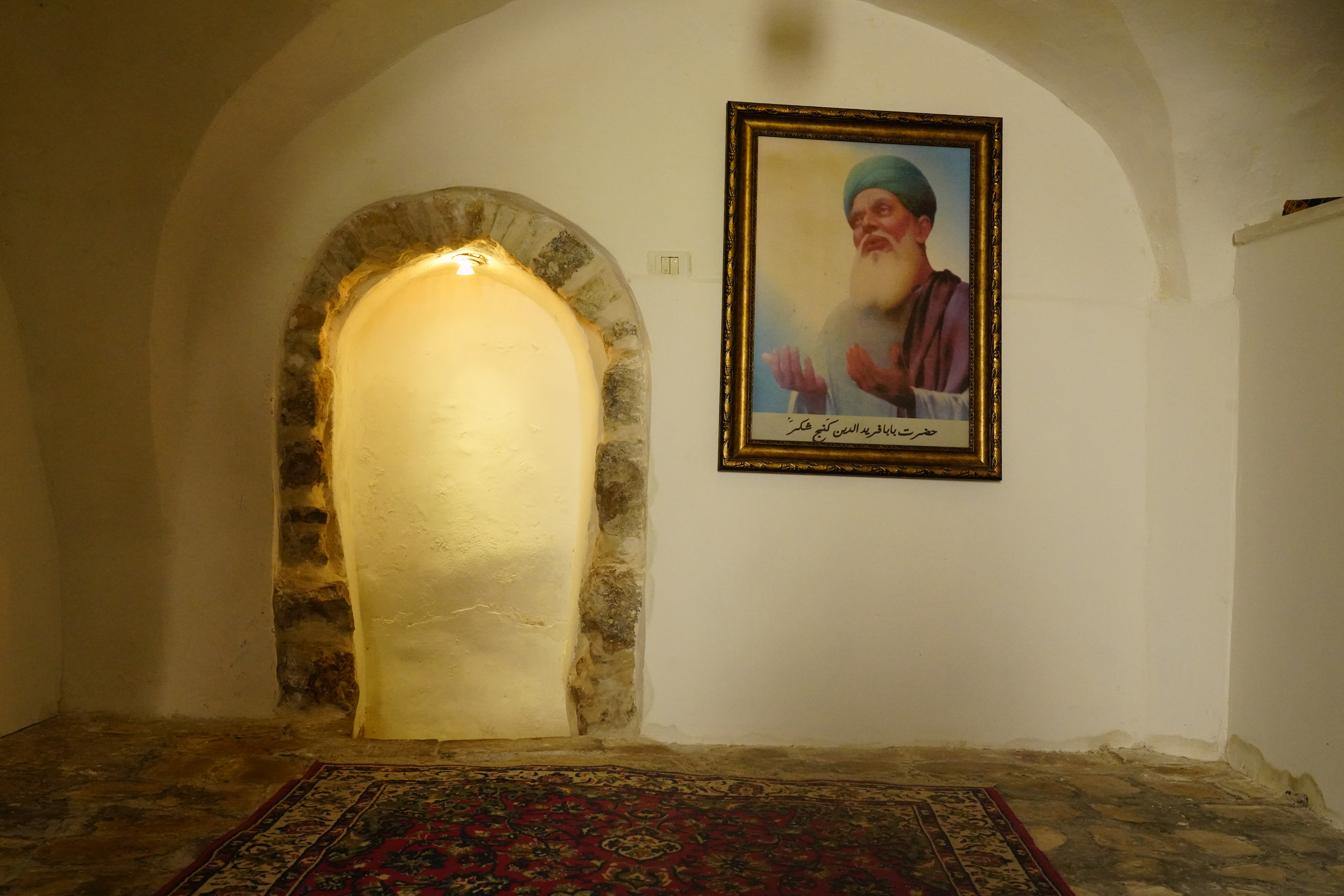
Room where Baba Farid had performed Chilla at Indian hospice, Jerusalem.

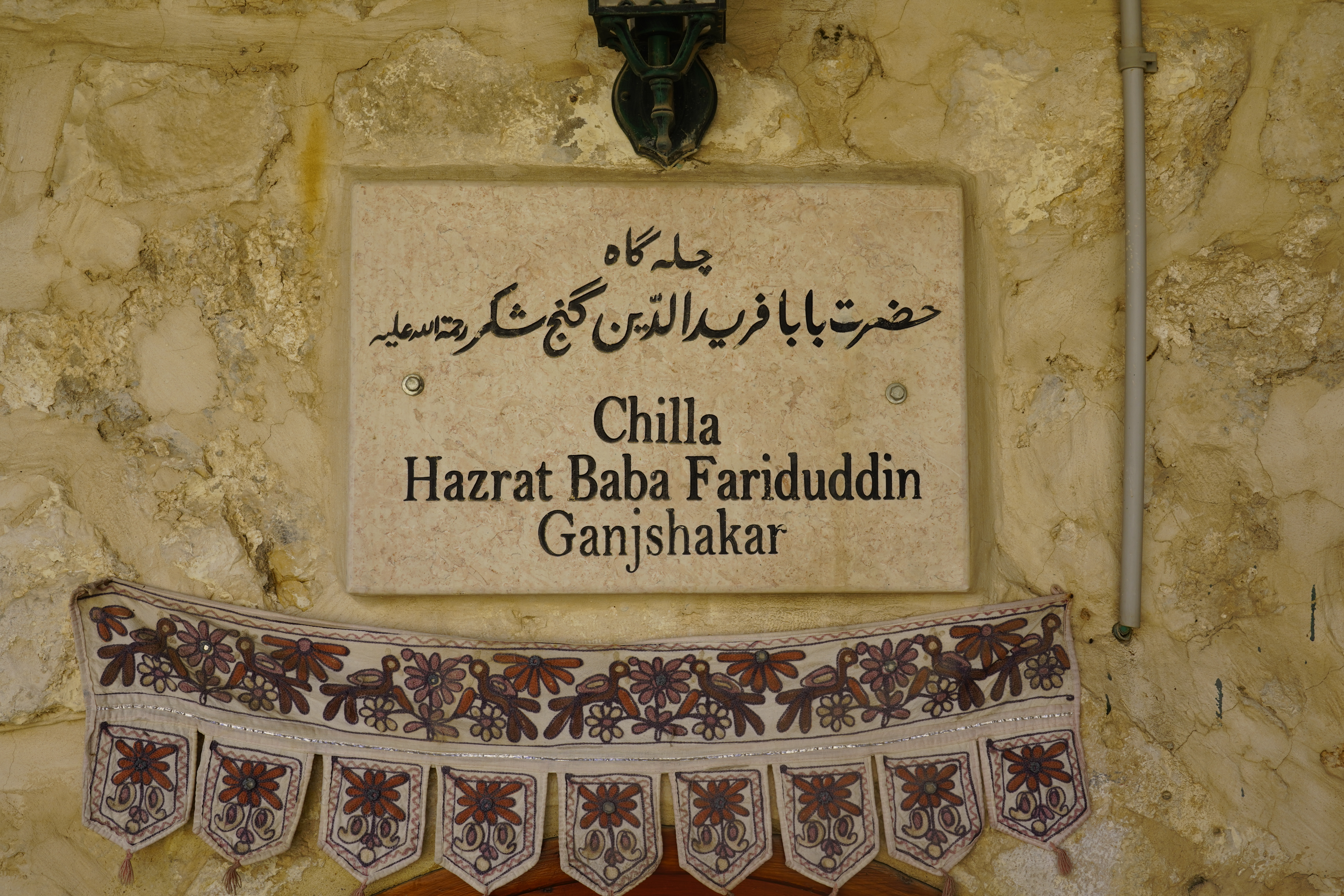
Outdoor plaque about Baba Farid at Indian hospice, Jerusalem

== Chillas ==
- A Chilla of Baba Farid is located in Dhirdan village of Lunkaransar tehsil in Bikaner district, Rajasthan, India.
- A Chilla of Baba Farid is located in Sheikhchuliya village of Rawatsar tehsil in Hanumangarh district, Rajasthan, India.
- Poraha village in Amravati district of Maharashtra, India.
- Niphad a town in district of Nashik of Maharashtra, India.
- Girad a small town in Samudrapur constituency of Wardha district of Maharashtra, India.
- Wazra a small town in Mahur constituency of Nanded district of Maharashtra, India
- Gadhdevi Singoli town Osmanabad district in Maharashtra india.
- Manegaon a small village situated in Tehsil Barghat, District Seoni, Madhya Pradesh, India.
- Badchicholi, in Tehsil Pandhurna District Chhindwara, Madhya Pradesh.
- Ajmer dargha sharif, Rajasthan, India.
- Fountain Hillock, Sholashahar, Chittagong, Bangladesh
- The Shrine (mazar/mazār) is vast and spacious, located in the city of Pakpattan, otherwise Pākpattan Sharīf, located in central Punjab province in Pakistan.
- A chilla is found near Baghanwala village of Pind Dadan Khan, District Jhelum.

A chilla is also found on the top of hill of Donphin nose hill of Visakhapatnam port of Visakhapatnam city in which it is believed that Hazarat Baba Fareed spent some time here, and there is a vast banyan tree in the premises which used to shed sugar in Baba's honour

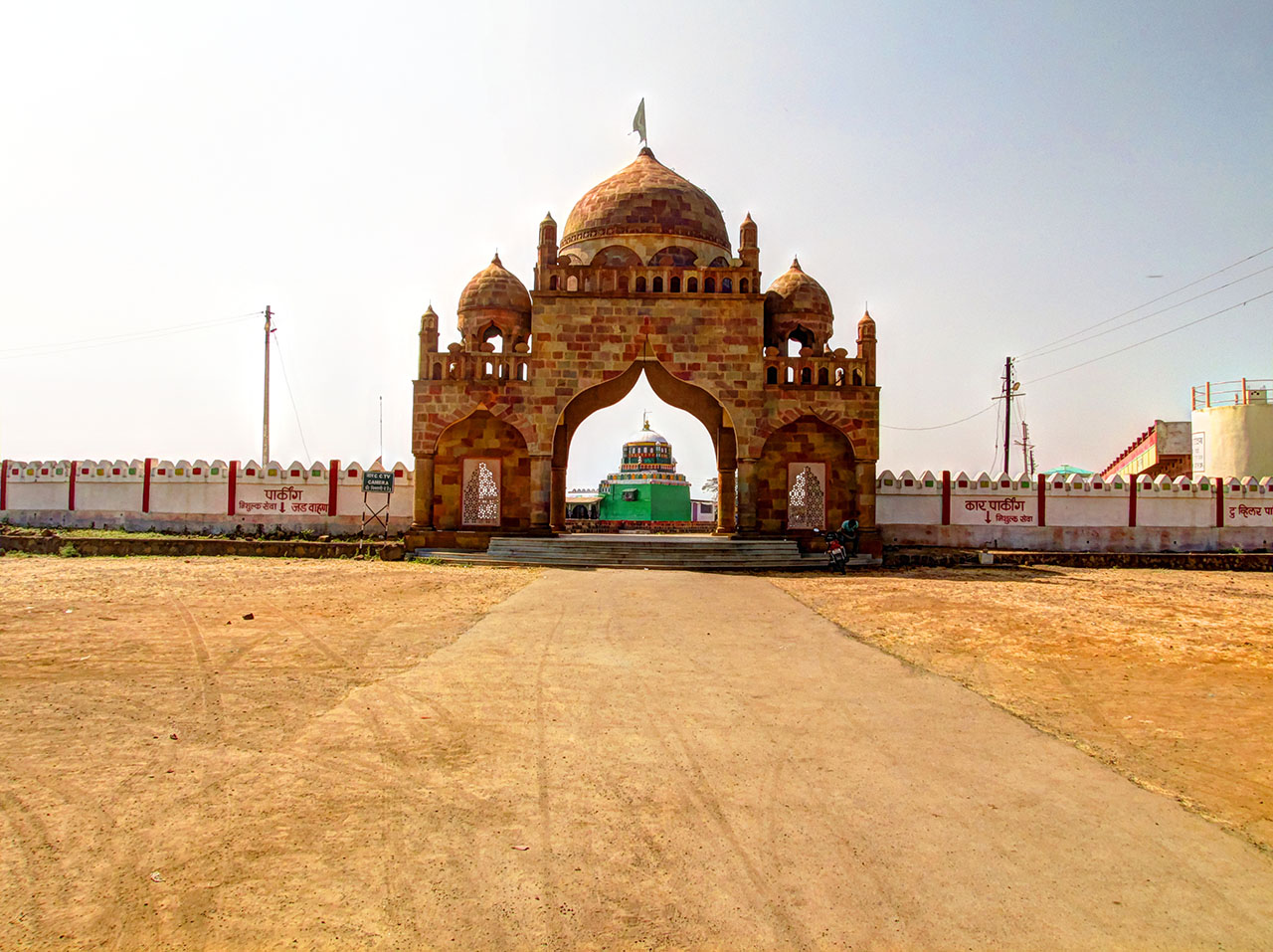
Entrance to the Chilla place of Baba Farid in Girad.

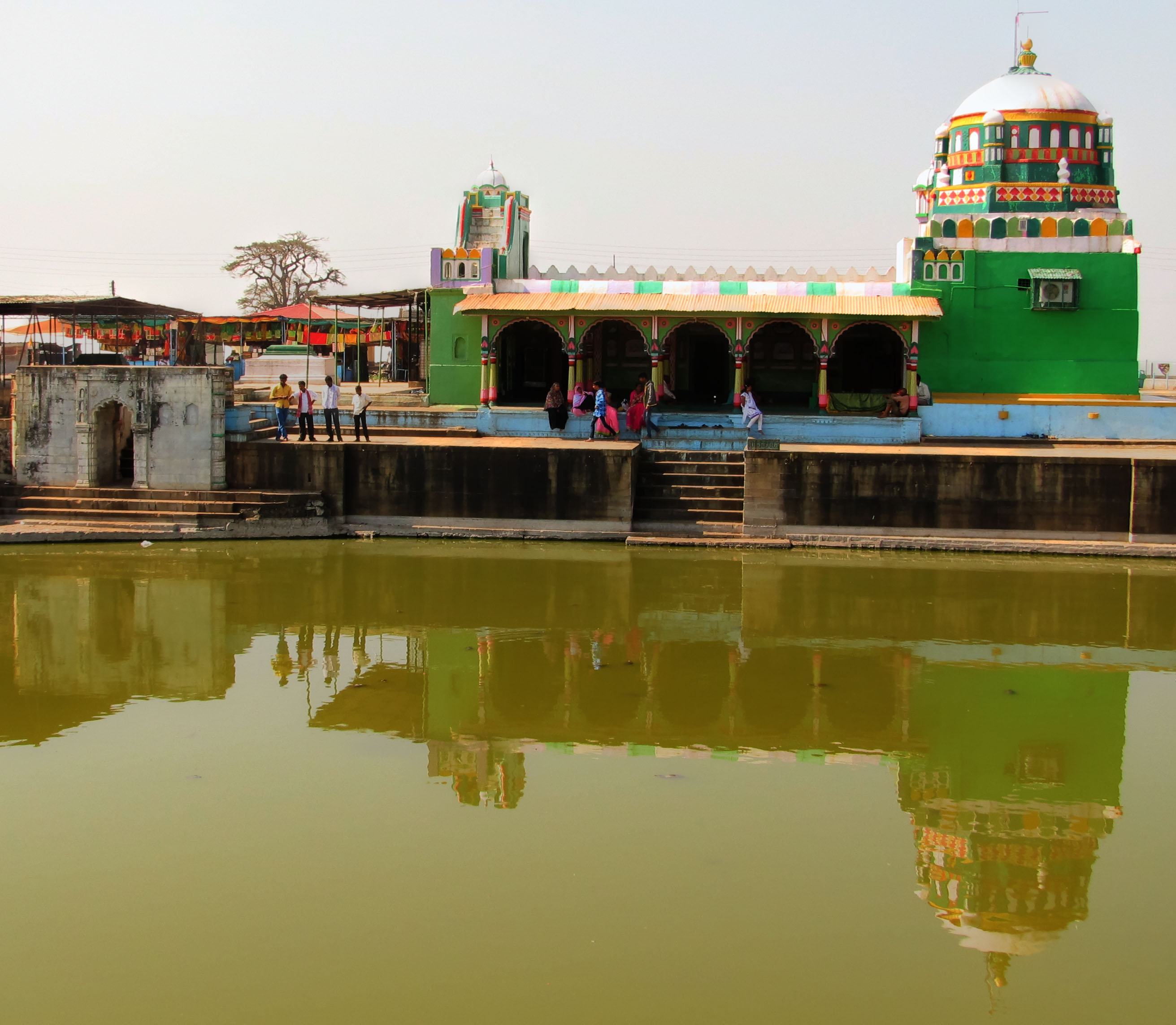
Shrine where Baba Farid had performed Chilla.

== Death anniversary and Urs ==
Every year, the saint's death anniversary or Urs is celebrated for six days in the first Islamic month of Muharram, in Pakpattan, Pakistan. The Bahishtī Darwāza (Gate of Paradise) is opened only once a year, during the time of the Urs fair. Hundreds of thousands of pilgrims and visitors from all over the country and the world come to pay homage. The door of the Bahishti Darwaza is made of silver, with floral designs inlaid in gold leaf. This "Gate to Paradise" is padlocked all year, and only opened for five days from sunset to sunrise in the month of Muharram. Some followers believe that by crossing this door all of one's sins are washed away. During the opening of the Gate of Paradise, extensive security arrangements are made to protect people from stampedes. In 2001, 27 people were crushed to death and 100 were injured in a stampede.

== Legacy ==
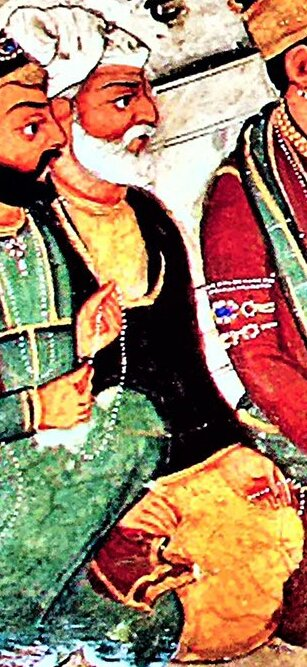
Detail of Sheikh Farid (wearing yellow and black garbs and donning a white turban)

As mentioned under Biography above, Baba Farid is considered one of the founding fathers of the Chishti Sufi order. His teacher, Khwaja Bakhtiar Kaki was a disciple of Moinuddin Chishti and Baba Farid's most famous disciple is Nizamuddin Chishti of Delhi, making him an important link in the chain of Chishti masters in South Asia and a very influential spiritual master in South Asia. [See also Honor in Sikhism below.]

One of Farīd's most important contributions to Punjabi literature was his development of the language for literary purposes. Whereas Sanskrit, Arabic, Turkish and Persian had historically been considered the languages of the learned and the elite, and used in monastic centres, Punjabi was generally considered a less refined folk language. Although earlier poets had written in a primitive Punjabi, before Farīd there was little in Punjabi literature apart from traditional and anonymous ballads. By using Punjabi as the language of poetry, Farīd laid the basis for a vernacular Punjabi literature that would be developed later. The English translation of Farid's devotional poetry by Rana Nayar was conferred with Sahitya Akademi Golden Jubilee award in 2007.

The city of Faridkot bears his name. According to legend, Farīd stopped by the city, then named Mokhalpūr, and sat in seclusion for forty days near the fort of King Mokhal. The king was said to be so impressed by his presence that he named the city after Baba Farid, which today is known as Tilla Baba Farid. The festival Bābā Sheikh Farād Āgman Purb Melā' is celebrated in September each year from (21–23 Sep, for 3 days), commemorating his arrival in the city. Ajodhan was also renamed as Farīd's 'Pāk Pattan', meaning 'Holy Ferry'; today it is generally called Pāk Pattan Sharīf. In Bangladesh, one of the largest districts of the country Faridpur District was named after him. It is believed that he established his seat in this town.

Faridia Islamic University, a religious madrassa in Sahiwal, Punjab, Pakistan, is named after him, and in July 1998, the Punjab Government in India established the Baba Farid University of Health Sciences at Faridkot, the city which itself was named after him.

There are various explanations of why Baba Farid was given the title Shakar Ganj ('Treasure of Sugar'). One legend says his mother used to encourage the young Farīd to pray by placing sugar under his prayer mat. Once, when she forgot, the young Farīd found the sugar anyway, an experience that gave him more spiritual fervour and led to his being given the name.

=== In Sikhism ===
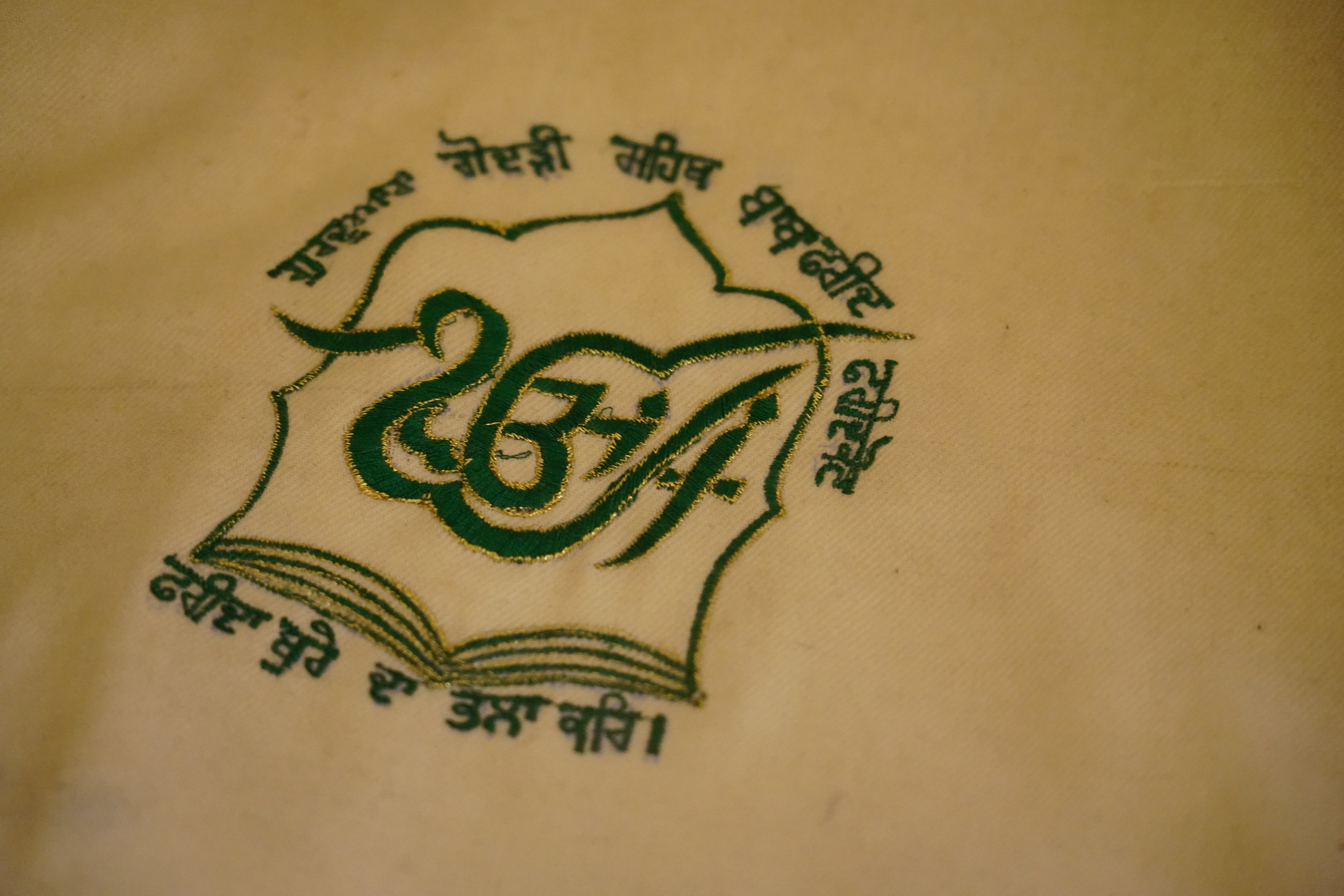
The Gurudwara Godri Sahib Baba Farid at Faridkot, Punjab

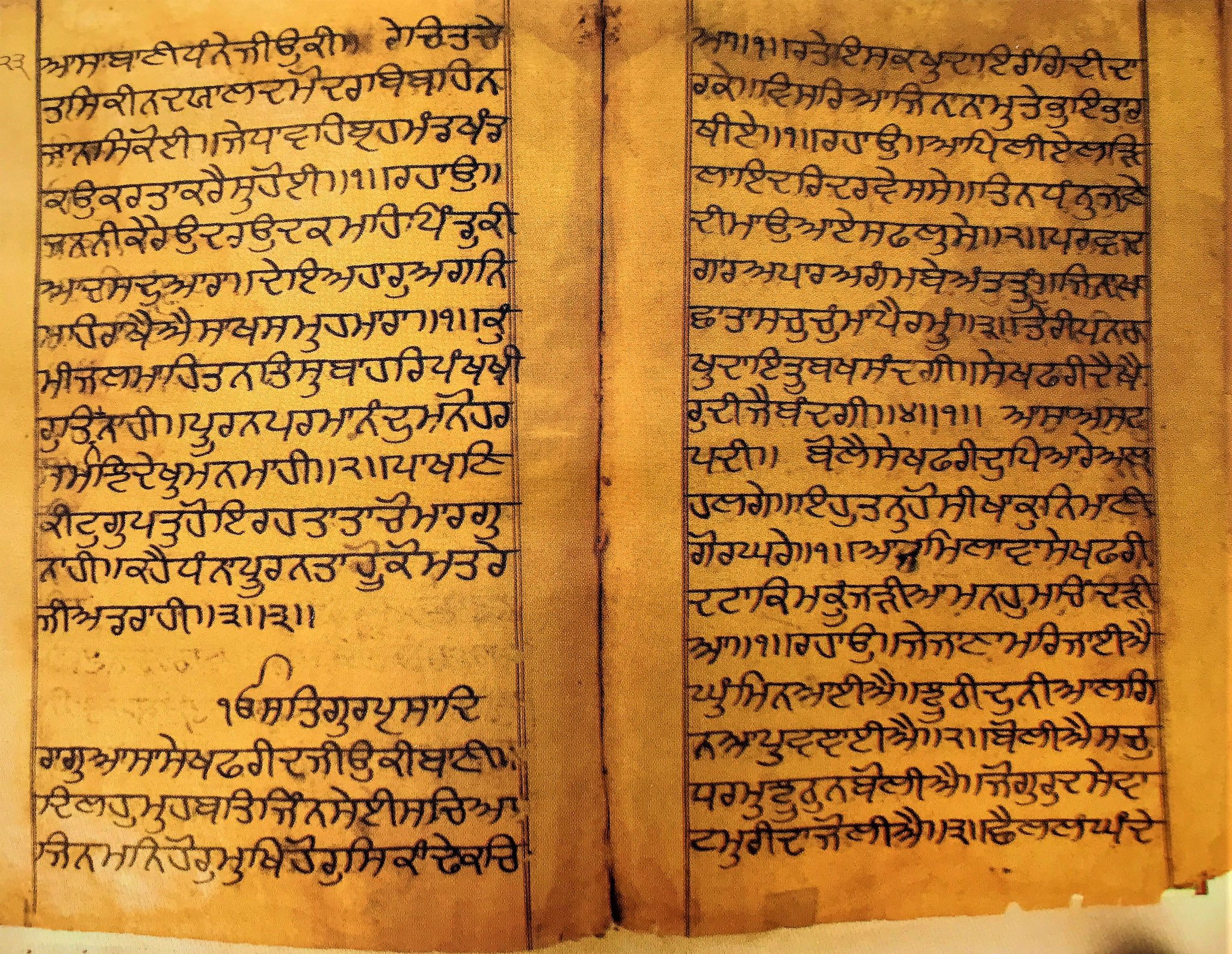
Historical Guru Granth Sahib manuscript showcasing verses attributed to Sheikh Fareed on page 488

Baba Farid, as he is commonly known, has his poetry included in the Guru Granth Sahib, the most sacred scripture of Sikhism, which includes 123 (or 134) hymns composed by Farid. Guru Arjan Dev Ji, the 5th guru of Sikhism, included these hymns himself in the Adi Granth, the predecessor of the Guru Granth Sahib. There are 10 Sikh gurus, but there are also 15 Bhagats in Sikhism. Baba Sheikh Farid is one of these equally revered 15 Bhagats.

=== Langar ===
Fariduddin Ganjshakar first introduced the institution of the Langar in the Punjab region. The institution greatly contributed to the social fabric of Punjabi society and allowed peoples of various faiths and backgrounds to attain free food and drink. The practice, introduced by Fariduddin Ganjshakar grew and is documented in the Jawahir al-Faridi compiled in 1623 CE. It was later, both the institution and term, adopted by Sikhs.

=== Commemorative postage stamp ===
In 1989, on the 800th birth anniversary of Baba Farid, the Pakistan Post Office issued a commemorative postage stamp in his honor.

=== Places named after him ===
- Baba Farid University of Health Sciences, Punjab, India
- Faridpur, Bangladesh
- Faridkot, Punjab, India
- Sheikhsar, Rajasthan, India
- Sheikhchuliya, Rajasthan, India
- Faridabad, Haryana, India

== Descendants ==
Salim Chisti (1478 – 1572), a famous Sufi saint during the reign of Akbar, was a direct descendant of Baba Farid. Muhibbullah Allahabadi (1587–1648) was also his descendant. Islam Khan I and Mukarram Khan who served as governors of Bengal Subah were grand-sons of Salim Chishti. The noble Paigah family, which was influential in the former Hyderabad state, also traced its lineage from Baba Farid.

== See also ==
- List of mausolea
- Sufism
- List of Sufi Saints
