= Alauddin Sabir Kaliyari =

Sufi saint of Kaliyar, India (1196–1291)

Sultan al-Arifeen Alauddin Ali Ahmed Sabir Kaliyari
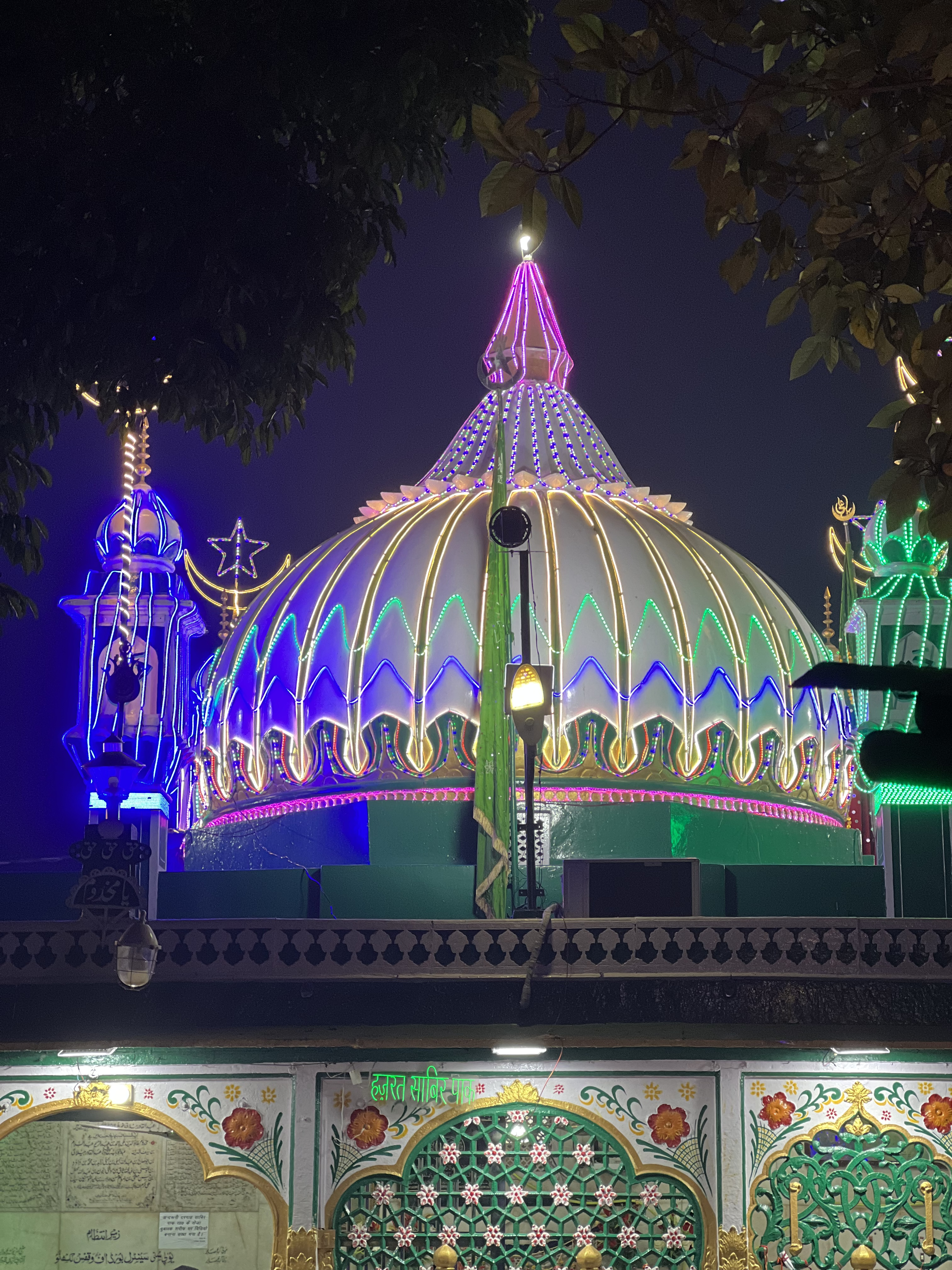
- Dome of Dargah Sabir Pak Kaliyari
- Title: Makhdoom Khwaja

Personal life
- Born: 21 February 1196 Multan, Khwarazmian Empire
- Died: 16 March 1291 (aged 95) Kaliyar Sharif, Roorkee, Delhi Sultanate
- Resting place: Kaliyar Sharif
- Other names: Sabir; Sabir Pia; Sabir-e-Pak; Charaag-e-Chisht; Aghyas-e-Hind; Makhdoom-ul-Alam
- Relations: Abdul Qadir Gilani (great-grandfather)

Religious life
- Religion: Sunni Islam
- Denomination: Sunni
- Jurisprudence: Hanafi
- Movement: Sufism

Senior posting
- Predecessor: Baba Fareed
- Successor: Khwaja Shamsuddin Turk Panipati

Khwāja Makhdoom Sayyid Alauddin Ali Ahmed "Sabir" (1196–1291) also known as Sabir Kaliyari (Urdu: صابر کلیری; lit. 'Sabir of Kaliyar'), was an Indian Sunni Muslim preacher and Sufi saint of the 13th century. He was a nephew and successor to Baba Fareed, great grandson of Abdul Qadir Gilani, and the founder of Sabiriya branch of the Chishti order.

== Biography ==
Sabir Kaliyari was the great grandson of Abdul Qadir Gilani. His father was Sayyid Abdus Salaam Abdur Rahim Jilani, son of Abdul Wahaab Jilani, eldest son of Abdul Qadir Jilani. His mother was Jamilah, elder sister of Baba Fariduddin Ganjshakar and a direct descendant of second Rashidun caliph Umar al Farooq.

Sabir Kaliyari was born on 13 Rabi' al-awwal, 592 Hijri (1196). After the death of his father in 1204, his mother brought him to Pakpattan to Baba Fareed.

Baba Fareed entrusted him with the duty of distribution of food (Langar). He accepted this duty happily and in between engaged himself in prayers. He dispensed with his duties well and also attended the discourse of Baba Freed Ganj-e-Shakar. Frequent and continuous fasting and eating leaves and wild food made him weak.

When his mother came back again and saw him, she complained to his brother (Baba Fareed) about his weakness. Baba Fareed called upon him and asked the reason. Sabir Pak replied, "You ordered me to distribute the food and not to partake from it". Baba Fareed embraced him happily and remarked, "He is sabir (Patient)". From that day forth, He became famous with the name of "Sabir".

== Dargah ==
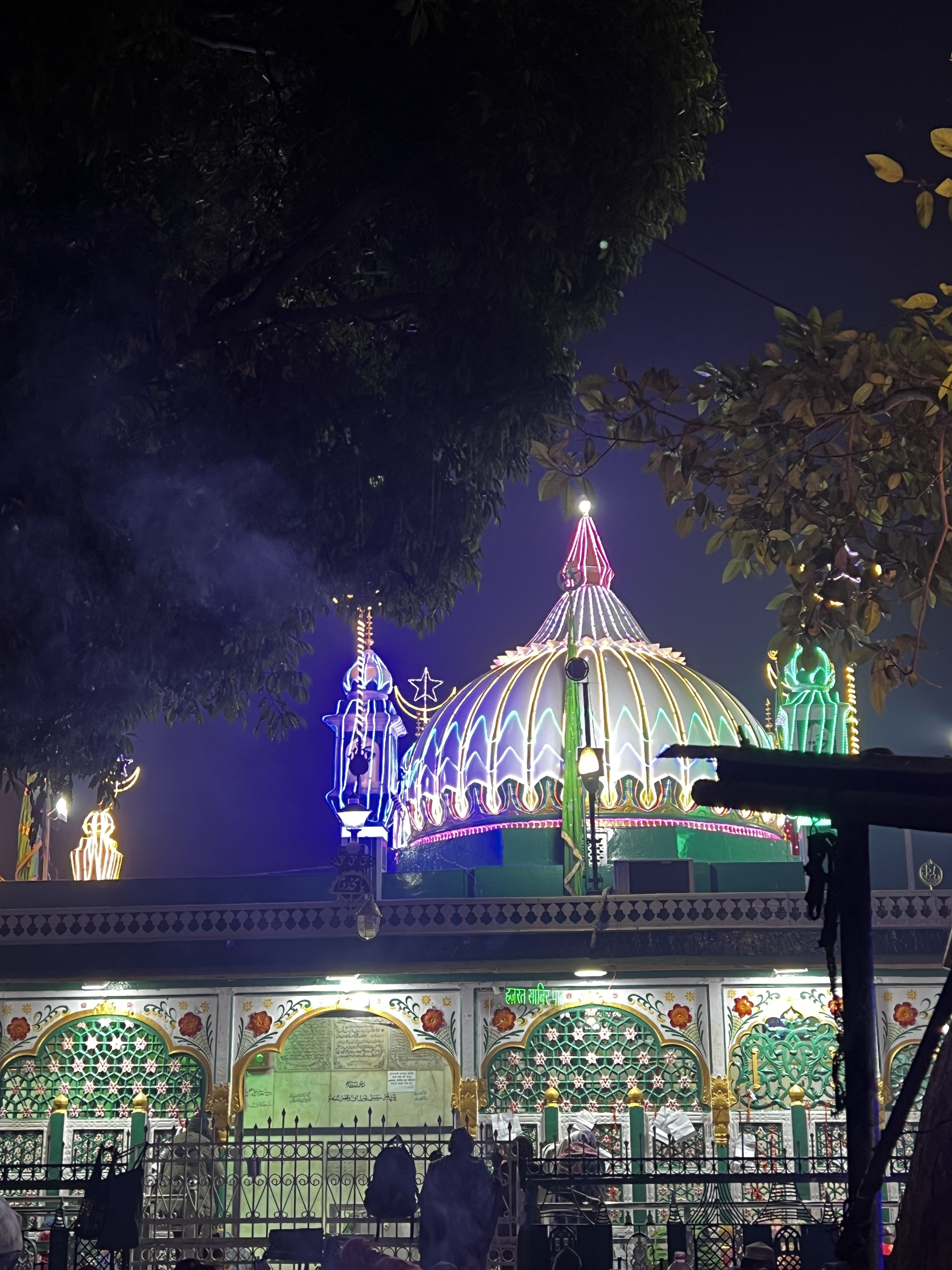
Dargah Sabir Pak, Kaliyar

His resting place (Dargah) is located in Piran-e-Kaliyar Sharif, 7 km from Roorkee, in Haridwar district, besides Ganga canal, and is approachable by a metalled road. The tomb was built by Ibrahim Lodhi, a ruler of Delhi Sultanate.

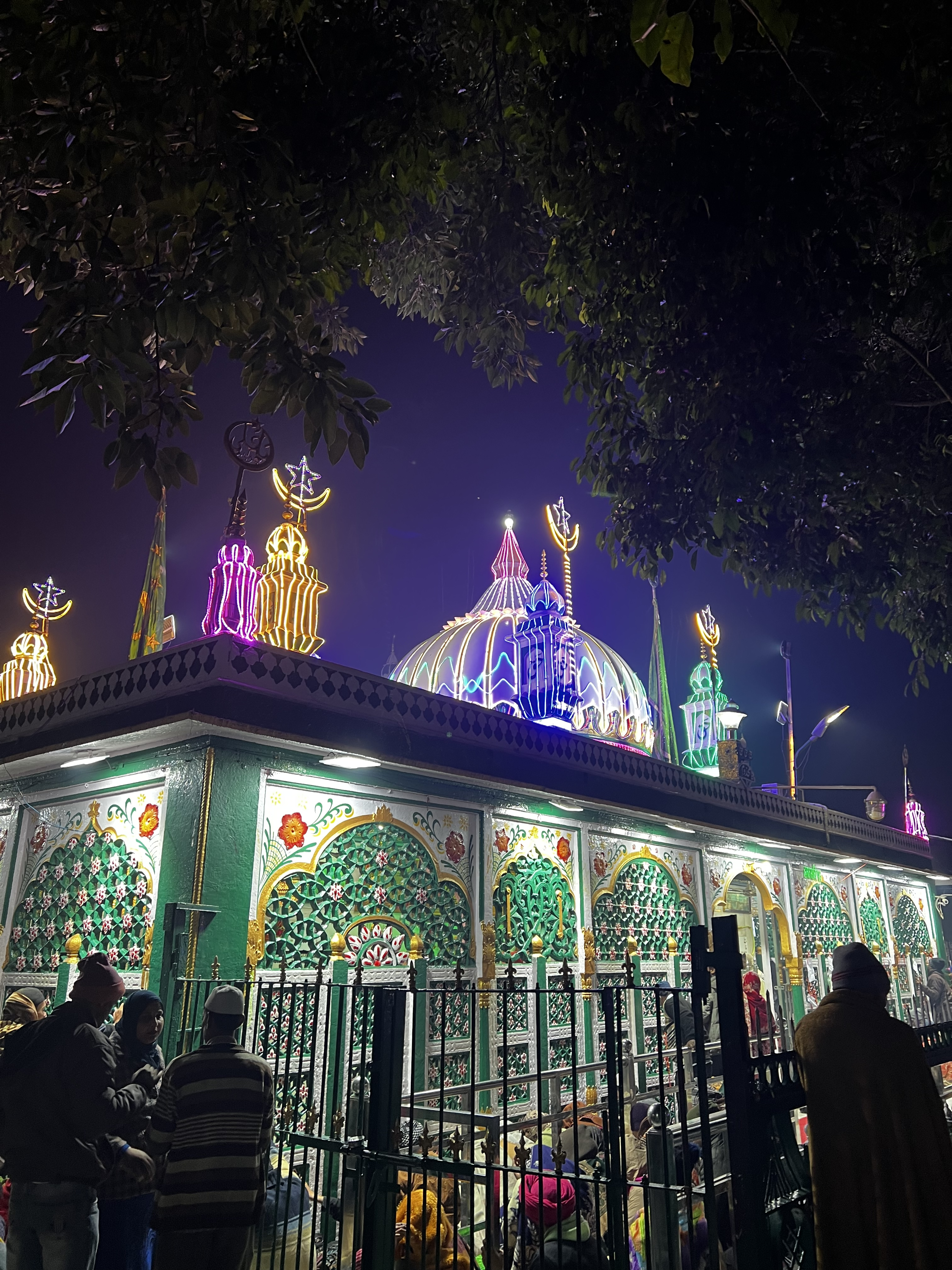
Dargah Shareef Sabir Allaudin Kaliyari R.A

A 15-day 'Urs' celebrations are held each year at the shrine, in the Rabi' al-awwal month of the Hijri calendar and the Dargah has become a symbol of national integration as people regardless of their religion, caste and creed throng it, in large numbers.

== See also ==
- Chishti Order
- Nizamuddin Auliya
- Kaliyar Sharif
- Piran Kaliyar Assembly constituency
