= Sheikhsar =

Sheikhsar Sukhchainpura
- village
- Location in Rajasthan, India Sheikhsar (India)
- Coordinates: 28.604384°N 73.979423°E
- Country: India
- State: Rajasthan
- District: Bikaner
- Named for: Baba Sheikh Farid

Population (2001)
  - Total: 5,820

Languages
  - Official: Hindi
- Time zone: UTC+5:30 (IST)
- PIN: 334603
- Telephone code: 91-151-XX XX XXX
- ISO 3166 code: RJ-IN
- Vehicle registration: RJ-07
- Nearest city: Lunkaransar

State of Shekhsar शेखसर रियासत
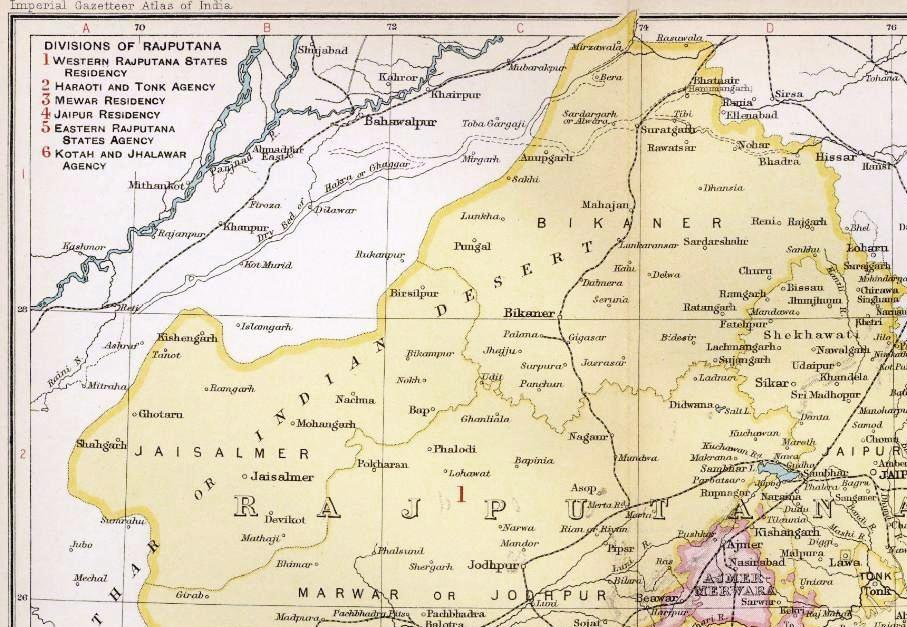
- Official languages: Rajasthani and Hindi
- Religion: Hinduism (state religion)
- Demonym: Sheikhsar
Succeeded by
Bikaner State
- Today part of: Bikaner, Rajasthan, India

Sheikhsar (formally known as Sukhchainpura) is a village in Lunkaransar tehsil of Bikaner district in Rajasthan, India. It is situated on the north-east border of the district adjoining Churu and Hanumangarh district boundaries. The village has a population of 5820 out of them are Scheduled Caste(SC) 1182 and Scheduled Tribe(ST) 4.

== History ==
Formerly it was the capital of the princely state of Sheikhsar which later got merge with the princely state of Bikaner.

=== Sheikhsar State ===
king Pandu Godar of Ladhadia was in love with Malki, the daughter of the king Raisal Beni of Raslana and the princess Malki also loved him. But her father got her married to king Phula Saharan of the princely state of Bharag. Princess Malki sent a message through her spy to King Pandu Godar that he should take her away. Taking this message, Pandu Godar attacked Bhadaga with his army and went away with Malki. Due to this action of his, other rulers attacked the princely state of Pandu Godara and Pandu could not fight them alone, so he took the help of Rao Bika, son of Rao Jodha, with his help he escaped from Ladhadia but his princely state Ladhadia suffered heavy losses. Later Godars established a new princely state, Sheikhsar and Pandu Godar gave his entire princely state to Rao Bika in return for his help, which later came to be known as the princely state of Bikaner.

=== Origin of Village Name ===
Baba Sheikh Farid visited northern areas of Rajasthan and lived there for long time. And his spiritual teachings affected people. In the Sukhchainpura village of Rajasthan, Baba Sheikh Farid made salty water drinkable, by his Yoga Maya. And people of Sukhchainpura village been so impressed by 'Yog Power' and devotion of Baba that they changed the name of village to Sheikhsar.
