= Kaliyar Sharif =

Shrine in India

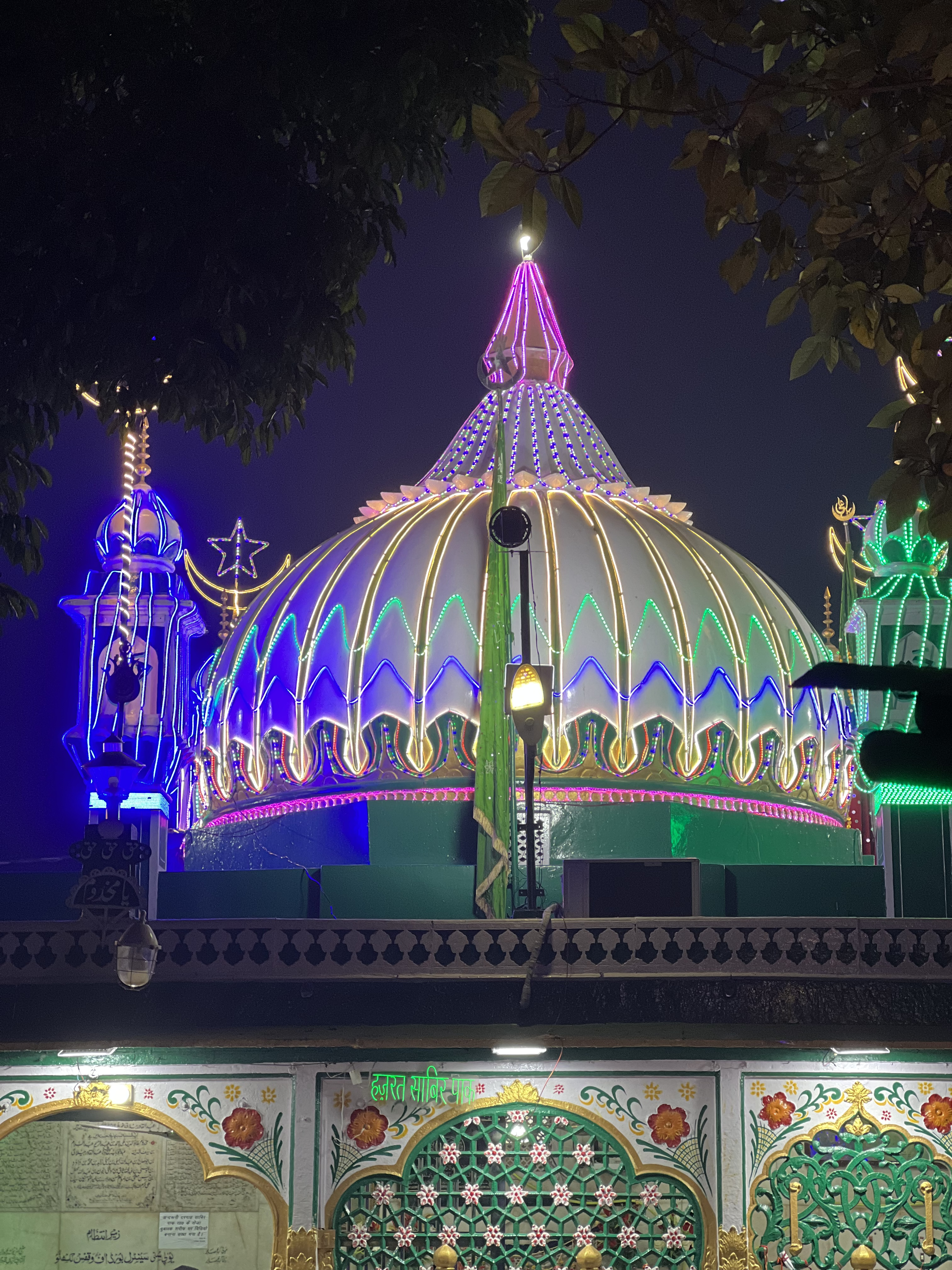

Religion
- Affiliation: Sufism

Piran Kaliyar Sharif or Kaliyar Sharif Dargah or Dargah Sabir Pak is the dargah (Sufi mausoleum) of 13th-century Sufi of Chishti order, Alauddin Sabir Kaliyari (Sabir Pak). It is situated near Haridwar and Roorkee in Uttarakhand, India. It is one of the most revered shrines for Muslims in India and is equally revered by Hindus and followers of other religions. The shrine was built by Ibrahim Lodhi, an Afghan ruler of Delhi Sultanate.

Sabir Pak was a Nephew and successor of Baba Farid and the founder of the Sabiriya branch of the Chishti order.

== Allauddin Ali Ahmad Sabir Kaliyari ==
Alauddin Sabir Kaliyari was born in 1196 AD in Herat to Jamila Khatun, the elder sister of Baba Fareed. After the death of his father Syed Abul Rahim, in 1204, his mother brought him to Pakpattan to Baba Fareed, who then made him his disciple and put him in charge of the langar.

When Alauddin's mother visited him after a long time, she found him weak, prompting her to demand an explanation from Baba Fareed. Baba Fareed explained that he was made in charge of the kitchen and hence had no shortage of food.

Alauddin explained that although he was in charge of the kitchen, Baba Fareed didn't mention him to eat from it. He sustained himself by foraging in the jungle during his free time. Impressed by his perseverance, he was then given the title Sabir (lit. 'Patient').

In 1253 AD, after being appointed as the protector of Kaliyar by Baba Fareed, Alauddin Sabir Kaliyari reached Kaliyar and remained there for the rest of his life, dying on the 13th of Rabi al-awwal, 690 Hijri (1291).

== Gular Tree at Dargah ==
Kaliyar Sharif Dargah complex is home to a notable Gular tree, which holds significance for pilgrims visiting the shrine. Pilgrims often take the tree's fruits as Tabarruk believing them to receive blessings (Barakah). It is said that the revered saint used to meditate under the shade of the Gular tree.

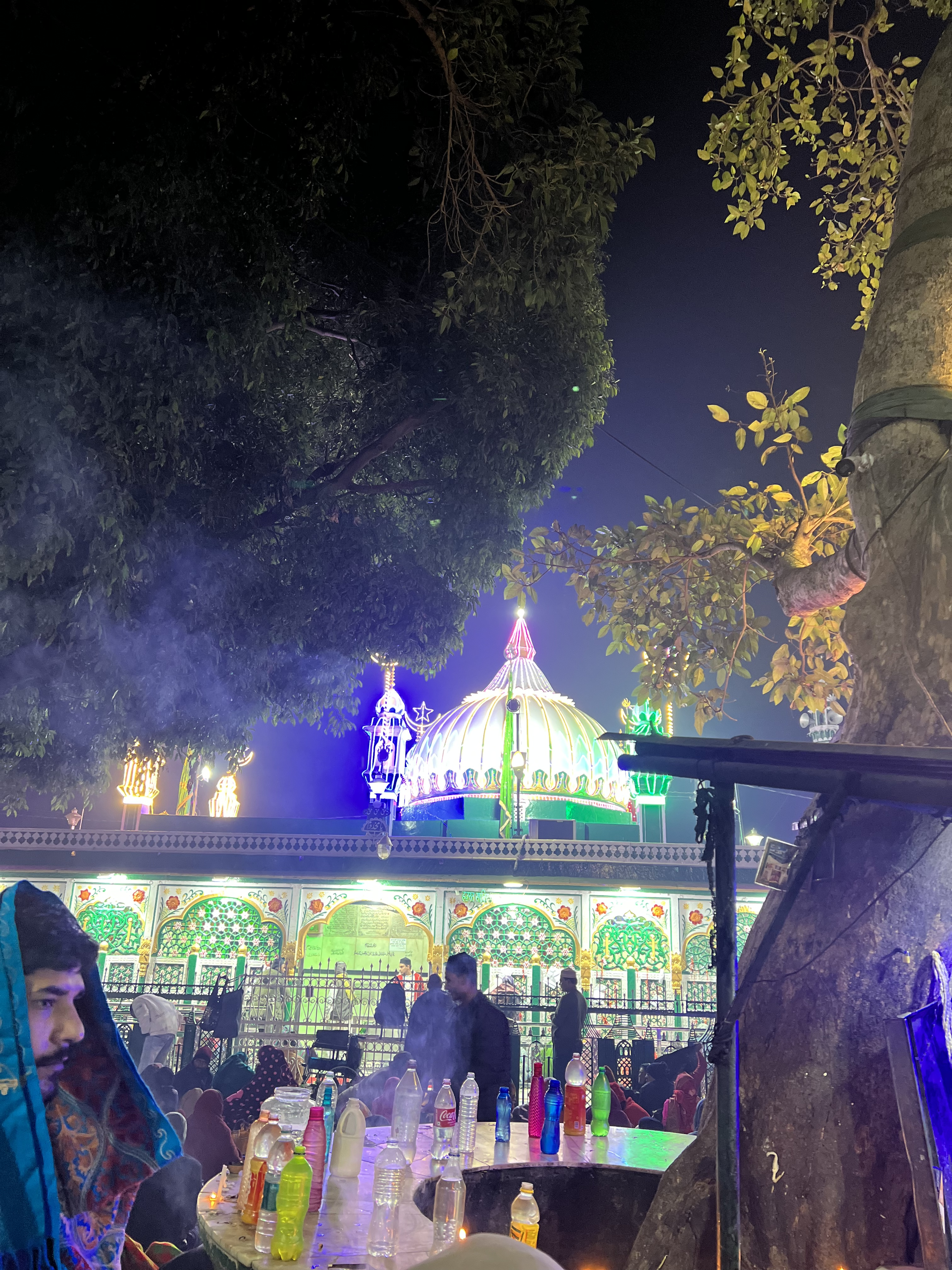
Famous Gular tree at Dargah Sabir Pak,Kaliyar

== Location ==
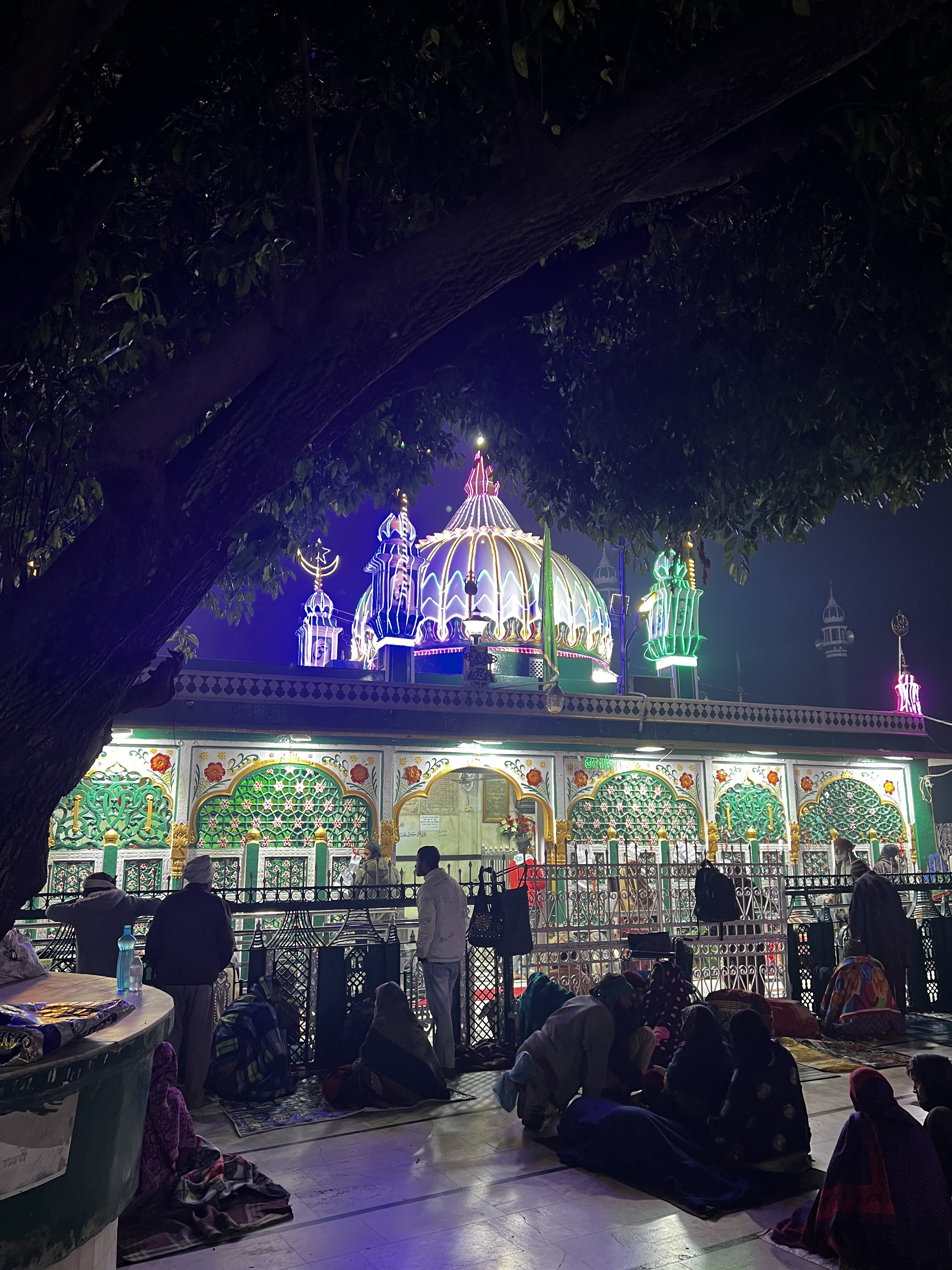
An evening at the Dargah (2024).

Situated on the outskirts of Roorkee town, the shrine is a revered destination for both tourists and devotees, renowned for its mystical powers and attracting millions of devotees from various religious backgrounds, both within India and from abroad.

== Piran Kaliyar Town ==
Over the centuries, a small town developed around the shrine and came to be known as Piran Kaliyar. In later history, India's first steam engine, Jenny Lind, (specially shipped from England moved on rails in India) ran in Roorkee on 22 December 1851, between Roorkee and Piran Kaliyar, two years before the first passenger train ran from Bombay to Thane in 1853. Operated by the Bengal Sappers, the railway line was built to carry soil used for the construction of the Upper Ganges Canal aqueduct from Piran Kaliyar, 10 km (6.2 miles) from the city.

== Legislative assembly ==
Piran Kaliyar is also an Uttarakhand Legislative Assembly constituency, part of the Haridwar Lok Sabha constituency.
