= Sahajarasar =

Village in Rajasthan, India

- Village
- सहजरासर
- Location in Rajasthan, India
- Coordinates: 28.34°N 73.74°E
- Country: India
- State: Rajasthan
- District: Bikaner
- Tehsil: Lunkaransar
- Gram Panchayat: Sahajarasar

Area
  - Total: 6,793.4 ha (16,787 acres)

Population (2011)
  - Total: 3,983

Literacy rate
  - Total: 44.39%
- Time zone: UTC+5:30 (IST)
- PIN: 334602
- ISO 3166 code: RJ-IN
- Households: 815

Sahajarasar is a village located in Lunkaransar Tehsil of Bikaner district, Rajasthan, India, with a total of 815 families residing. The village of Sahajrasar is divided in two parts, the first one being Sahajrasar and the second one being Sahajrasar Bas. The village recently became a topic of discussion, when a sudden land subsidence created a 50 feet deep crater.

== Demographics ==
Sahajarasar village has population of 3983 of which 2098 are males while 1885 are females as per Population Census 2011.
