= Jamia Farida, Sahiwal =

Pakistani Barelvi madrasa

Jamia Faridia, Sahiwal is a Barelvi Islamic madrasa in Sahiwal, Punjab, Pakistan. named after Bābā Farīduddīn Mas'ūd Ganjshakar.

There are more than 1,900 students in separate male and female sections. Studies include Dars-e-Nizami, Tajveed, Hifzul Quran, and computer courses. It grants F.A, B.A and M.A. degrees.
