= Riyaz =

Riyaz (lit. 'training, practice') is the systematic practice of music, dance or any other art form usually under the guidance of a teacher or preceptor. In Hindustani classical music tradition, it is employed as a repertoire of exercises to cultivate the musicality of one's voice or fingers. It is known as Sadhakam or Sadhana in Carnatic music. It is followed rigorously by the students as well as exponents of vocal and dancing forms.

== The practice ==
The Riyaaz or Sadhakam, which often starts early in the morning at four, is taken seriously by the students for it requires intensity, discipline and commitment for years and forms an important component in the Guru - Shishya parampara (teacher-student tradition).

In Carnatic music, the impression is that the assiduous sadhakam of the Trinity of Carnatic Music was the bedrock of the excellence of the old-world vidwans.

A popular system for practice of the tabla, known as chilla, is mostly followed by Muslim exponents of music and involves 10–12 hours of daily riyaz for 40 days.
