= Thomas Login =

Scottish civil engineer (1823-1874)

Thomas Login FRSE MICE (1823–1874) was a Scottish civil engineer remembered for his road and canal works in India.

== Life ==
He was born in Stromness in Orkney in 1823. He was orphaned at an early age but cared for by his older siblings.

He was apprenticed as a civil engineer in Dundee and went out to India in 1844, aged 19, to join his elder brother Dr John Login (later Sir John Login) resident surgeon n Lucknow. He received an appointment as an engineer in the Department of Public Works under Major General W. Baker. In 1847 he was sent to assist Sir Proby Cautley on the Ganges Canal project. He was in sole charge of works in the Roorkee area. This included resolution of the Rutmoo and Puttri rapids in the Hurdwar area. Login later moved to work in Burma but became ill in 1856 and had to return to Britain to convalesce. Returning to India in 1857 he became Executive Engineer of the Ganges-Darjeeling Road and the Roorkee-Dehra Road.

In 1857 he was elected a Fellow of the Royal Society of Edinburgh his proposer being James Syme.

In 1864 Login moved to Sealkote and was involved in the creation of the Rechna Doab Canal. In 1865 he moved to Umballa as executive director of the upgrading of the Grand Trunk Road.

In 1868 he returned to Britain and worked on various waterway projects in the Norwich and Exeter areas.

In 1871 he returned to India via the newly opened Suez Canal and returned to Umballa as head engineer for roads north of Simla. Login caught a fever during this project and died in Sutlej on 5 June 1873. He was buried at Simla on the following day.
