= Muhammad ibn al-Qasim (Sahib al-Talaqan) =

9th-century Alid Imam

- Disappeared: 834 CE; Baghdad
- Status: Never apprehended
- Known for: Leading an Alid rebellion that took place in Talaqan

Muhammad ibn al-Qasim (Arabic: محمد بن القاسم), also known as Sahib al-Talaqan (lit. 'The Honoured of Talaqan'), was an Alid who led an unsuccessful Zaydi revolt against the Abbasid Caliphate in Talaqan, in what is now northeastern Afghanistan.

His full name is Muḥammad ibn al-Qāsim ibn ʿAlī ibn ʿUmar al-Ashraf ibn ʿAlī Zayn al-ʿĀbidīn ibn al-Ḥusayn ibn ʿAlī ibn Abī Ṭālib.

Ibn al-Qasim led an Alid rebellion in Talaqan in the year 219 AH (834 CE), during the days of the Abbasid Caliphate of Al-Mu'tasim. However, Al-Mu'tasim defeated and arrested him and carried him to Baghdad, detaining him in his palace.

Shortly after, Muhammad was able to escape and was never heard of again. Some people believed that Ibn al-Qasim died or fled, while some of the Shiites believed he was alive and would reappear and that he was the Mahdi.

Descendants of Muhammad Al-Sufi:

There is some difference of opinion when it comes to the descendants of Muhammad Al-Sufi, Al-Fakhri's author and Shaykh Taqi Ad-Din Hilai believe that they might have died out. However, Al-Asili Fi Ansab At-Talibiyeen mentions that the descendants of Qasim(whose only son was Muhammad Al-Sufi) continue up to this day. Here is the text from Al-Asili Fi Ansab At-Talibiyeen:

Ali al-Asghar bin Umar al-Ashraf had offspring from three of his children:

1. Al-Qasim, who had descendants.

2. Umar al-Shajari.

3. Abu Muhammad al-Hasan.

In al-Mabsoot it is stated that "his lineage descended from three men: al-Qasim, Umar al-Shajari and Abu Muhammad al-Hasan.".

Also Ibn Inabah, perhaps the most famous scholar in the field of Talibid genealogy finds a clan from amongst his descendants in Al-Faiz in Karbala and he mentions their ancestry. Here is the text from Umdatul Talib:

This Abu Ja'far Muhammad al-Sufi is an ancestor to "Ibn Barjam" known as Muhammad Ibn Muhammad, and his children are now in Bint Jbeil, in the region of Jabal Amel. His ancestors used to live in al-Hair, in the neighbourhood of the Abu al-Faiz family.(Karbala)

He said: "I am Muhammad ibn Muhammad ibn Ahmad ibn Ahmad ibn Muhammad ibn al-Abbas ibn Umar ibn Ishaq ibn Musa ibn Hamzah ibn Ahmad ibn Ali ibn Hamzah ibn al-Abbas ibn al-Hasan ibn Ali ibn Ishaq ibn Muhammad ibn Ja'far Ibn Muhammad Al-Sufi".

These are the people whom Abu Harb Muhammad al-Nasaba, the son of Muhammad al-Hasani al-Asghar, testified were descendants of Umar al-Ashraf ibn Zayn al-Abidin, may peace be upon him. Allah knows Best."

There are also some descendants in North India who migrated from Mashhad, according to the early books of Sadat of Al-Hind.

== See also ==
- Adam Sufi
- List of fugitives from justice who disappeared
