= Jamal-ud-Din Hansvi =

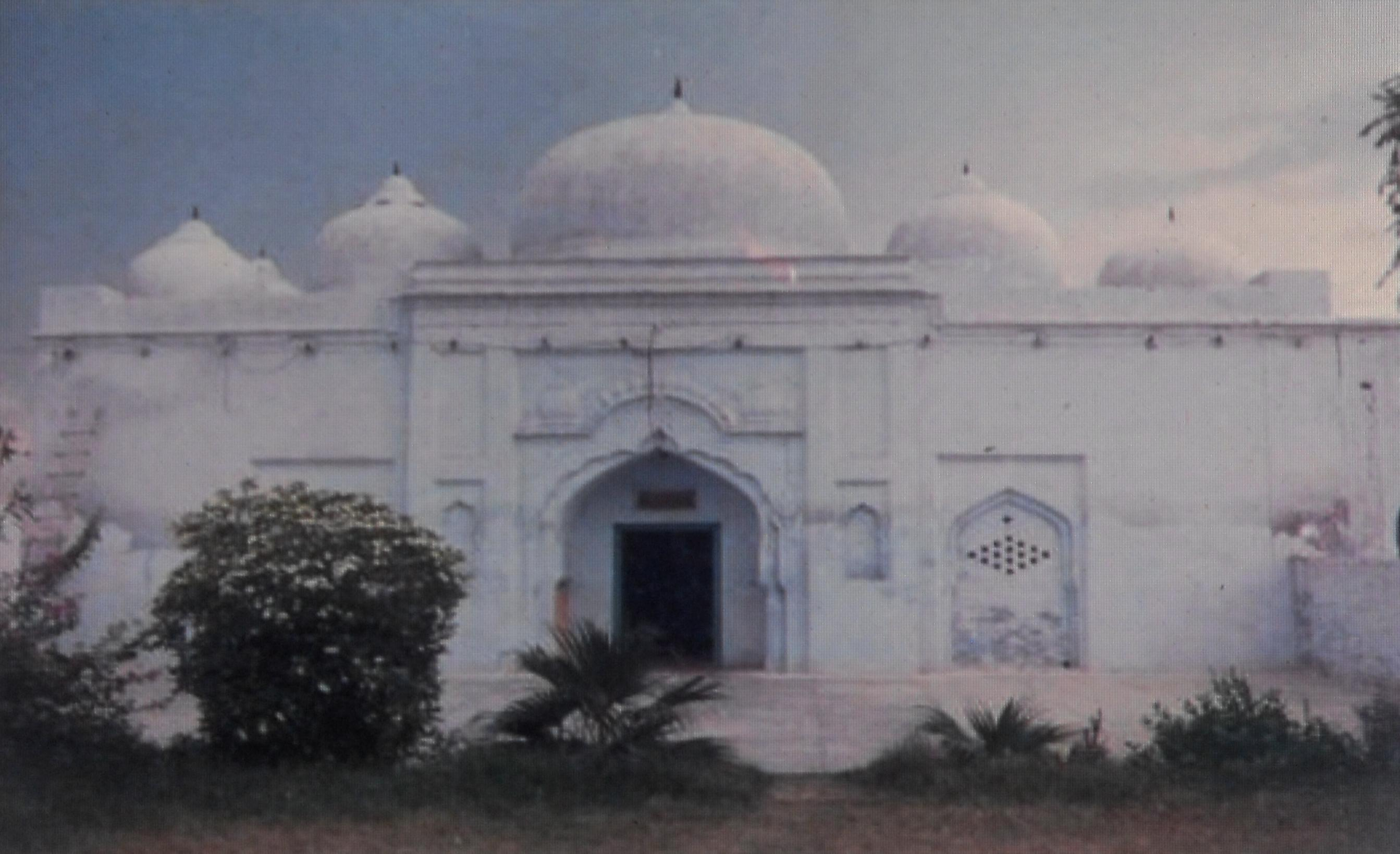

Personal life
- Born: 1184/85
- Died: 1260/61 Hansi

Religious life
- Religion: Islam (Sunni), specifically the Chishti Sufi order

Jamal-ud-Din Hansvi (1184/85–1260/61) was a mystic, poet, and author based in Hansi in the Punjab region. He wrote two works of poetry, the Mulhamat in Arabic and a divan (collection of poems) in Persian. He was a follower of the Chisti leader Baba Farid.

== Sources ==
- Qasemi, Sharif Husain (2003). "Hānsavi". In Yarshater, Ehsan (ed.). Encyclopædia Iranica (Online ed.). Encyclopædia Iranica Foundation. ISBN 978-0933273771.
