= Adam Sufi =

13th-century Sufi saint

Adam Sufi (1187–1297), popularly known as Makhdoom Adam Sufi, was an Islamic scholar, preacher and Sufi saint of Chishti order. He was the son of Sayyid Ibrahim Chishti of Hajipur. He was the father of Sayyid Hamid ad-Din Chishti Rajgiri and grandfather of Taym Allah Safayd Baz. He is buried in Pakki Dargah, near Jethuli in Patna, India.

== Ancestry and family history ==
He is the grandson of Khwaja Sayyid Jalal Ad-Din 'Abdal Chishti Al-Mashhadi.

He's the descendant of the famous Muhammad Ibn Al-Qasim(Sahib Talaqan) Al-Sufi As-Salih who led a revolt against 'Abd Allah Ibn Tahir of the Tahirids in the area of Northern Afghanistan in the regions of Talaqan, modern day Jowzjan and Takhar Province.

His ancestor Jalal Ad-Din was from Mashhad. His lineage is given as:

1: 'Ali Ibn Husayn Imam Zayn Al-'Abidin As-Sajjad

2: 'Umar Al-Ashraf.

3: 'Ali Al-Asghar Al-Muhaddith

4: Al-Qasim Al-Sha'ir Al-Baghdadi

5: Imam Abu Ja'far Muhammad Al-Sufi As-Salih (Sahib Talaqan)

6: Ja'far Abu Abdullah

7: Muhammad Al-Mushtab

8: Ishaq Al-Amir

9: 'Umar

10: Ahmed Al-Amir

11: Ya'qub Al-Amir

12: Mahmud/Muhammad

13: Muhammad

14: Ibrahim

15: Mahmud

16: Husayn/Hasan

17: Khwaja Sayyid Jalal Ad-Din 'Abdal Chishti Al-Mashhadi( one of the 5 famous students of 'Usman Harooni )

18: Shah Ibrahim Chishti

19: Makhdum Sayyid Adam Sufi.
