= Chilla katna =

In Hindustani classical music, Chilla or Chilla Katna (Doing the Chilla) is a stage of training or ritual where the student is fully isolated from the outside world and lives for music only. Some musicians spend long periods of their training in varying degrees of isolation and describe these as their chilla; for others, it's a shorter, more extreme retreat, traditionally lasting 40 days. In either form, it is thought to have the power of transforming not only the student's music, but their whole life. Chilla is widely used in the Punjab gharānā (school) of tabla playing.

== Origin of Name ==
The word Chilla in music comes from the practice of forty days after childbirth during which the mother is said to be "unclean", or quarantined, or more generally a period of religious fasting and worship.

== Method ==
The musicians lock themselves up in a solitary cell called chilla-khana for forty days and practice their instrument severely. A special diet, often omitting meat and grains, is taken during this period and very little food is eaten. Any contact to the outside world is avoided during this period. People try not to fall asleep at any cost, if necessary they will tie their hair to a noose at the ceiling. It is done to achieve a very high level of skill, that cannot be achieved due to normal regular practice. The chilla details may differ between gharanas (musical lineages).

== Notable Mentions ==
Abdul Karim Khan, a singer of the Kirana Gharana, described chilla as "lighting a fire under your life. You either cook or you burn. If you cook, everyone can enjoy your flavour – otherwise, you'll be a mass of cinders, a heap of ash."

"Forego your sense of self if you want to achieve greatness. It’s only when a seed is thrown in the soil, does it blossom into a flower of a lush garden". This was the famous Ghalib couplet, late Sitar maestro Ustad Abdul Halim Jaffer Khan often quoted, to sum-up the work required to become a successful Hindustani musician.

Well known musicians who have documented their Chilla experience include Ravi Shankar and Zakir Hussain.

== See also ==
- Riyaz
