= Roorkee =

City in Uttarakhand, India

Roorkee City
- City
- Roorkee City
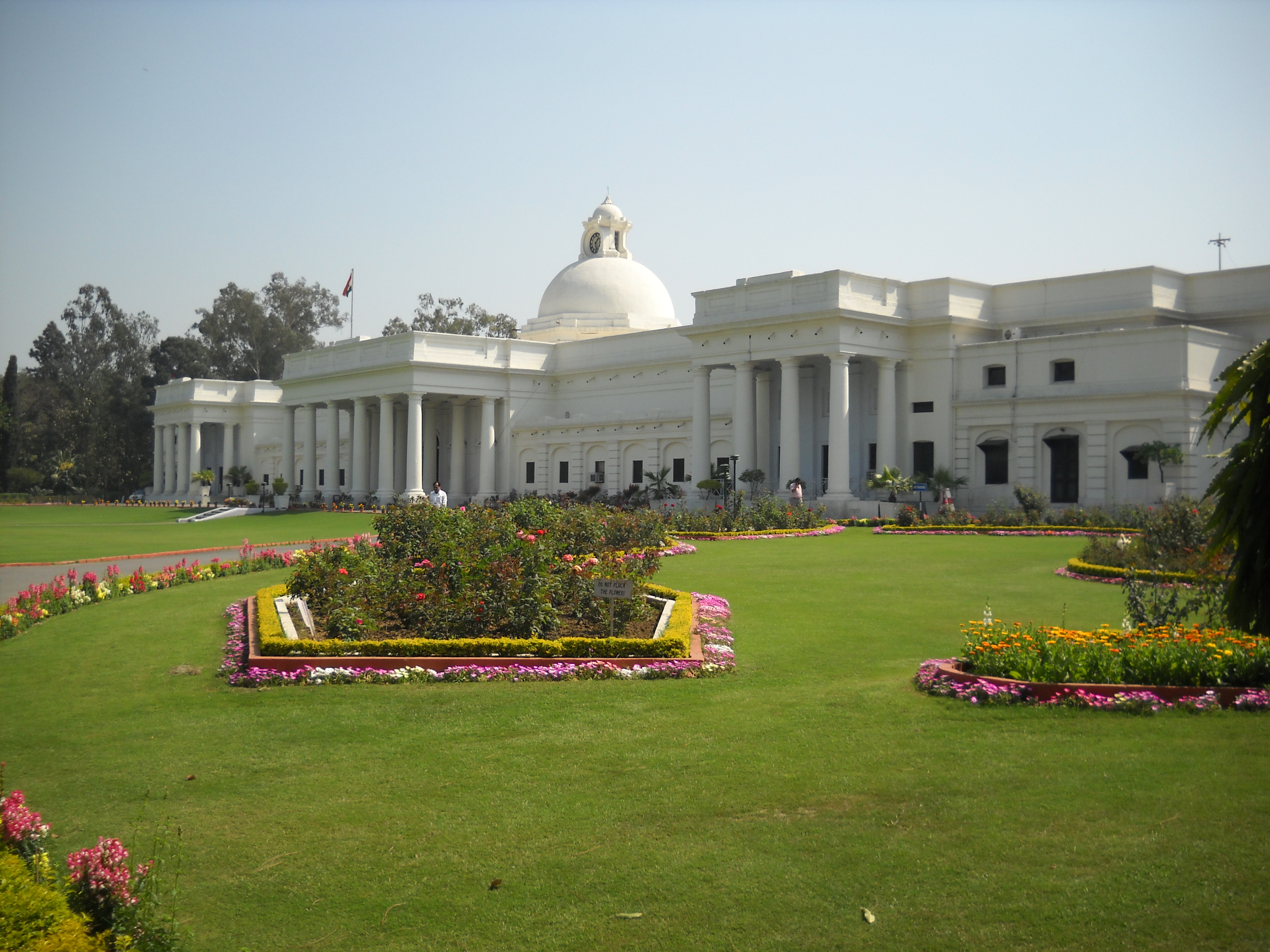
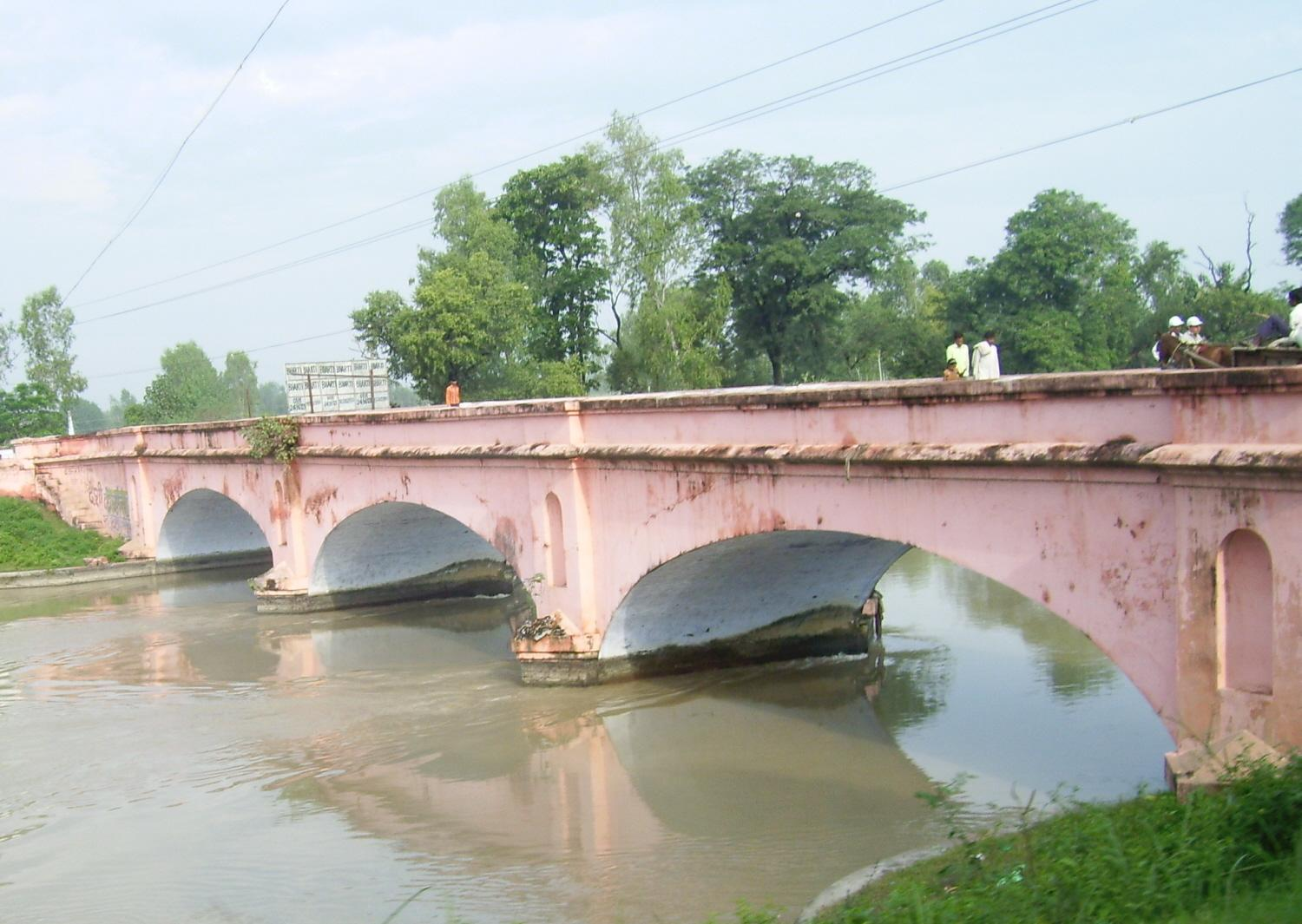
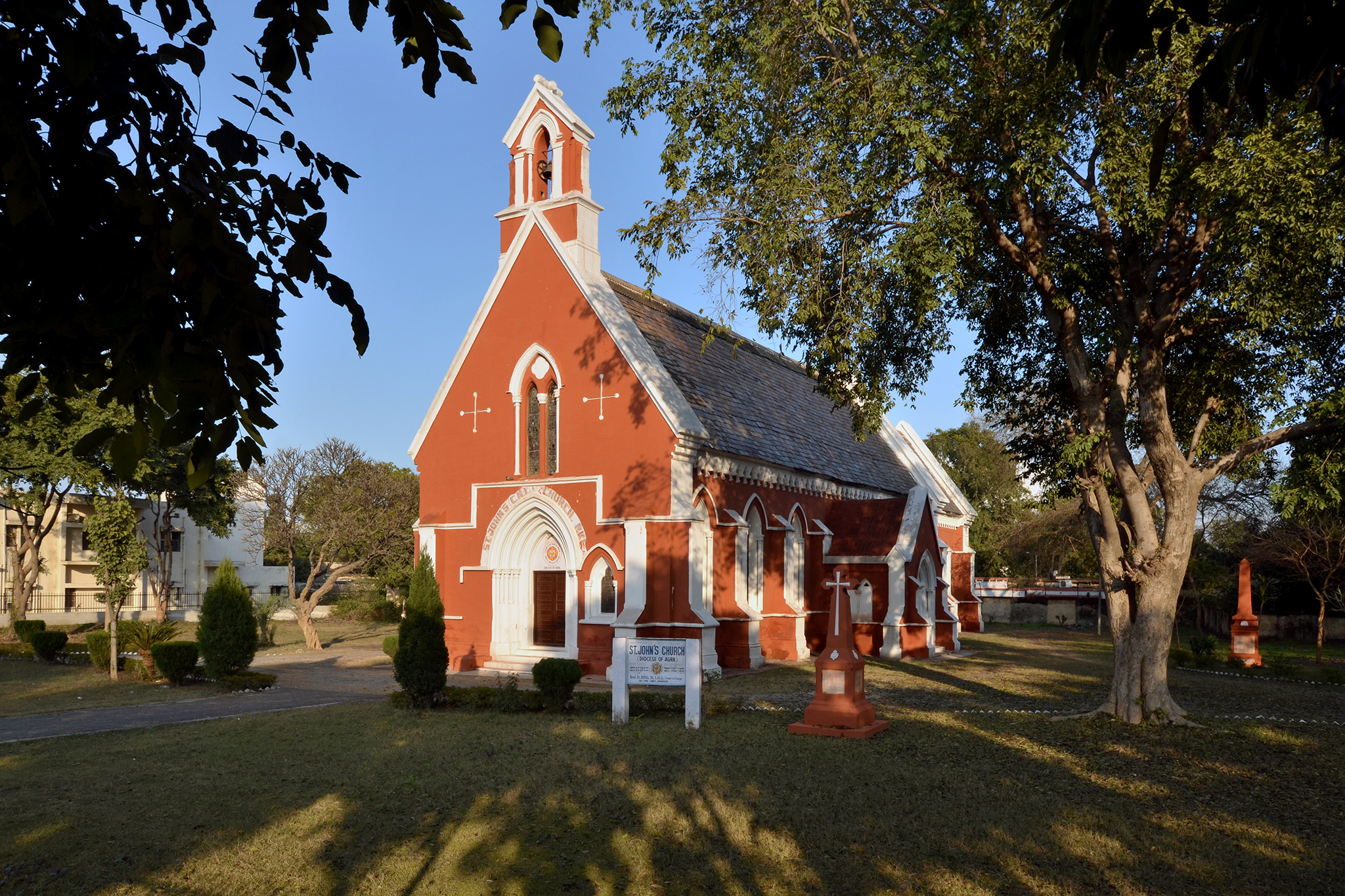
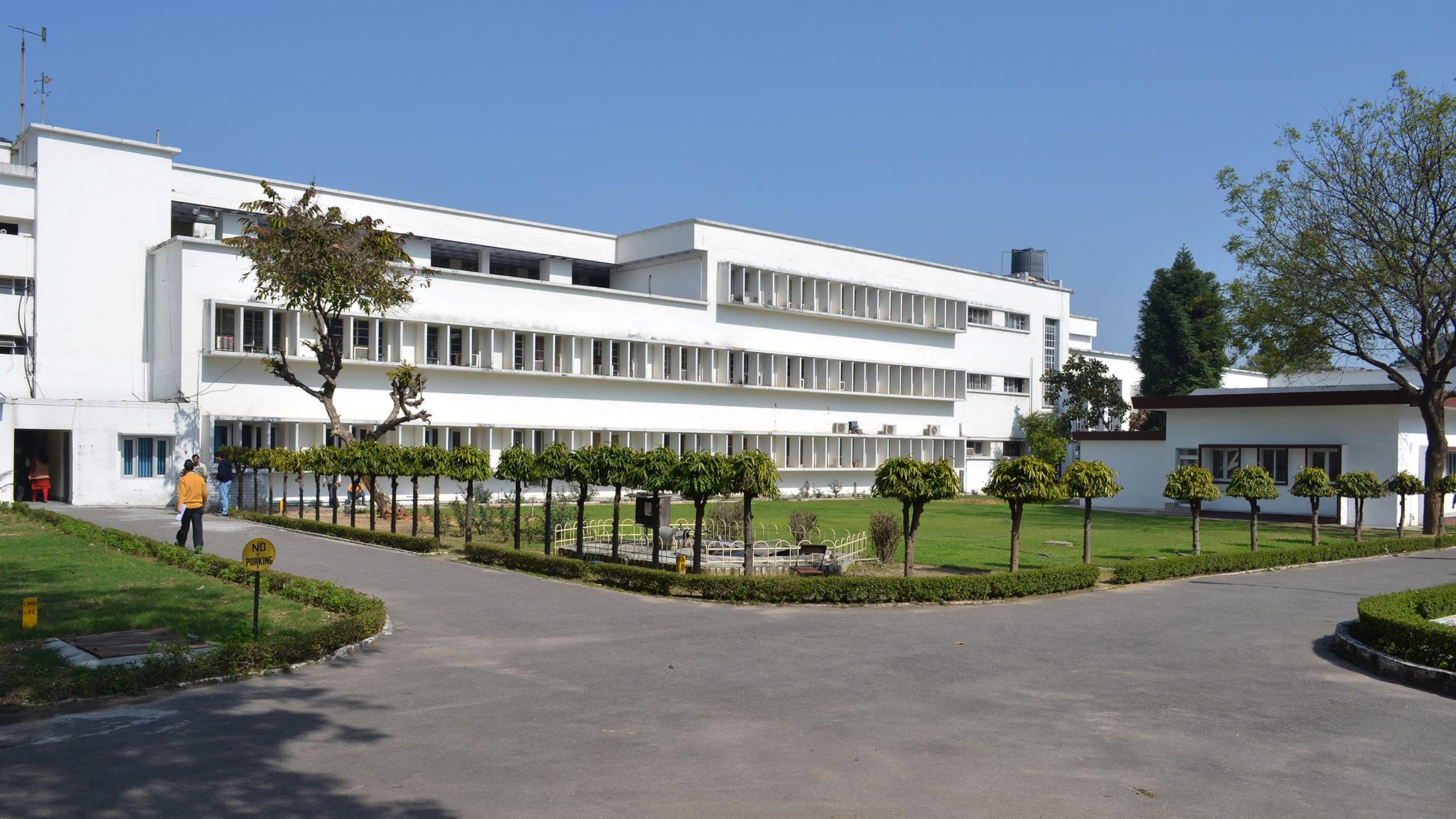
- Top to Bottom; Left to Right: IIT Roorkee, The East India Company-era (1854) Ganeshpur Bridge over the Ganges Canal, St. John's Church and Central Building Research Institute.

- Location in Uttarakhand, India
- Coordinates: 29°52′29.49″N 77°53′23.74″E
- Country: India
- State: Uttarakhand
- District: Haridwar
- Founded: 1842
- Municipality: 1868
- Founder: Proby Cautley

Government
  - Type: Municipal Corporation
  - Body: Roorkee Municipal Corporation
  - Mayor: Anita Agarwal (BJP)
  - Lok Sabha MP: Trivendra Singh Rawat (BJP)
  - MLA: Pradip Batra (BJP)
  - Municipal Commissioner: Rakesh Chandra Tiwari, PCS
  - Rank: 5
- Elevation: 275 m (902 ft)

Population (2011)
  - Metro: 132,889

Languages
  - Official: Hindi
  - Native: Khariboli
- Time zone: UTC+5:30 (IST)
- PIN: 247667
- Telephone code: +91-1332
- Vehicle registration: UK-17
- Sex ratio: 1.12 ♂/♀

Roorkee (Rūṛkī; Hindi: [ɾuːɽkiː]), formerly also anglicized as Rurki, is a city and municipal corporation in the Haridwar district of the state of Uttarakhand, India. It is 31 km (19 mi) from Haridwar, the district headquarters. It is spread over a flat terrain under the Sivalik Hills of the Himalayas. The city is developed on the banks of the Ganges Canal, its dominant feature, which flows from north–south through the middle of the city.

Roorkee is home to Asia's Second engineering college the Indian Institute of Technology Roorkee, formerly known as Thomson College of Civil Engineering. Roorkee is also known for the Roorkee Cantonment, one of the country's oldest military establishments and the headquarters of Bengal Engineer Group since 1853.

== History ==
Until 1824, Roorkee was part of Landhaura estate or kingship exercises by local Gurjars of Panwar clan. The area was under control of (Panwar) Gurjar chiefs in eastern Saharanpur including Haridwar in kingship of Raja Sabha Chandra of Jabarhera (Jhabrera).

In 1792 Ram Dayal and his son Sawai Singh were ruling the area but due to family reasons Ramdayal left Jhabrera and went to Landhaura village and left Roorkee under the control of Raja Ramdayal Singh at Landhaura. There were two branches of Jhabrera State (riyasat), with main branch at Jhabrera and the second one at Landhaura. Both father and son were ruling simultaneously without any conflicts until the death of Raja Sawai Singh of Jabarhera in 1803. After the death of Sawai Singh total control of powers transferred to Ram Dayal Singh at Landhaura.

After the death of Raja Ram Dayal Singh Gurjar in 29 March 1813, it was a part of the Landhaura princely state until 1824 when the British occupied it.

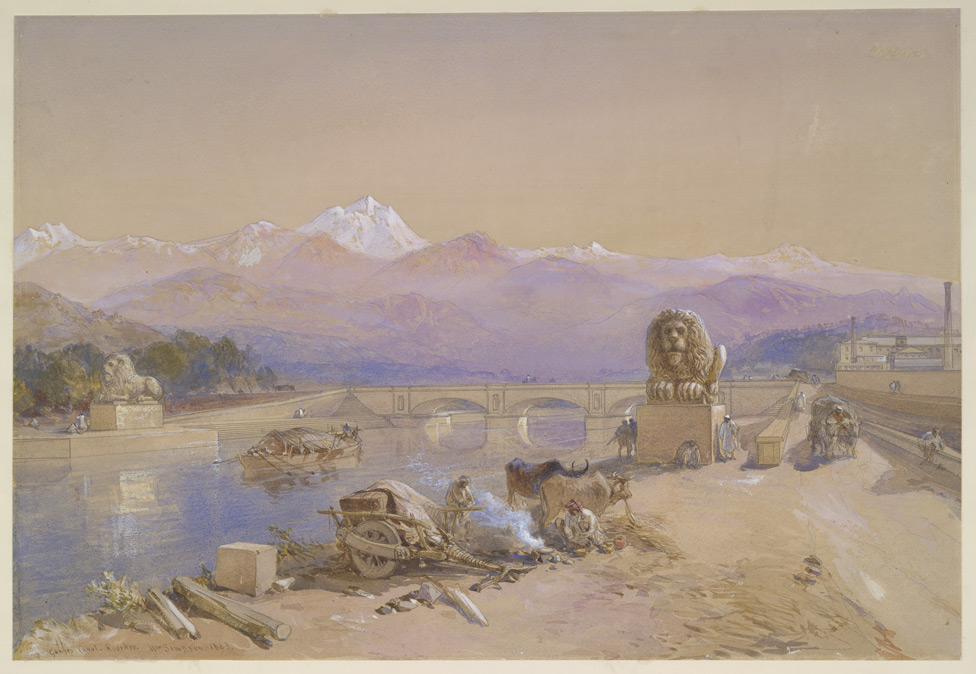
Ganga canal, 1860.

Roorkee is listed in the Ain-i-Akbari as a pargana under the sarkar of Saharanpur, producing a revenue of 12,234 dams for the imperial treasury and supplying a force of 1200 infantry and 125 cavalry.

Before 1840, the city was a tiny hamlet consisting of mud huts on the banks of the Solani rivulet. Digging work on the Upper Ganges Canal formally began in April 1842, under the aegis of Proby Cautley, a British officer. Local works were designed and overseen by the engineer Thomas Login. Soon, Roorkee developed into a town. The canal, which was formally opened on 8 April 1854, provided irrigation waters for more than 767,000 acres (310,000 ha) in 5,000 villages.

Col. P.T. Cautley, an officer in the British Army, was most instrumental in constructing the canal. According to Dept. of Hydrology, the canal, which is still considered as a marvel of engineering, was built in 1853. However, water was released in the canal on 8 April 1854.

To look after the maintenance of the canal, the Canal Workshop and Iron Foundry were established in 1843 on the civil lines of the canal bank. This was followed by the establishment of a Civil Engineering School; classes started in 1845 to train local youth to assist in the civil-engineering work of the Upper Ganges Canal. This was to become the first engineering college established in India. On 25 November 1847, the college was formally constituted through a proposal by the Sir James Thomason, Lt. Governor of North-Western Province (1843–53). After his death in 1853, the college was rechristened as Thomason College of Civil Engineering. The college later renamed to University of Roorkee in 1949; on 21 September 2001, through an Act of Parliament, it was made one of the Indian Institutes of Technology, IIT Roorkee. In 1853 Bengal Sappers and Miners were stationed here which provided a controlling influence during the 1857 uprising. Under the Post Office Act of 1866, it was among the first few towns to have a post office and first telegraph office in the district. In 1886, Roorkee was placed on the rail map of India. In 1907, the first provincial trunk road from Meerut-Roorkee-Dehradun was constructed. In 1920, Roorkee became the first town in Uttar Pradesh to have hydroelectricity.

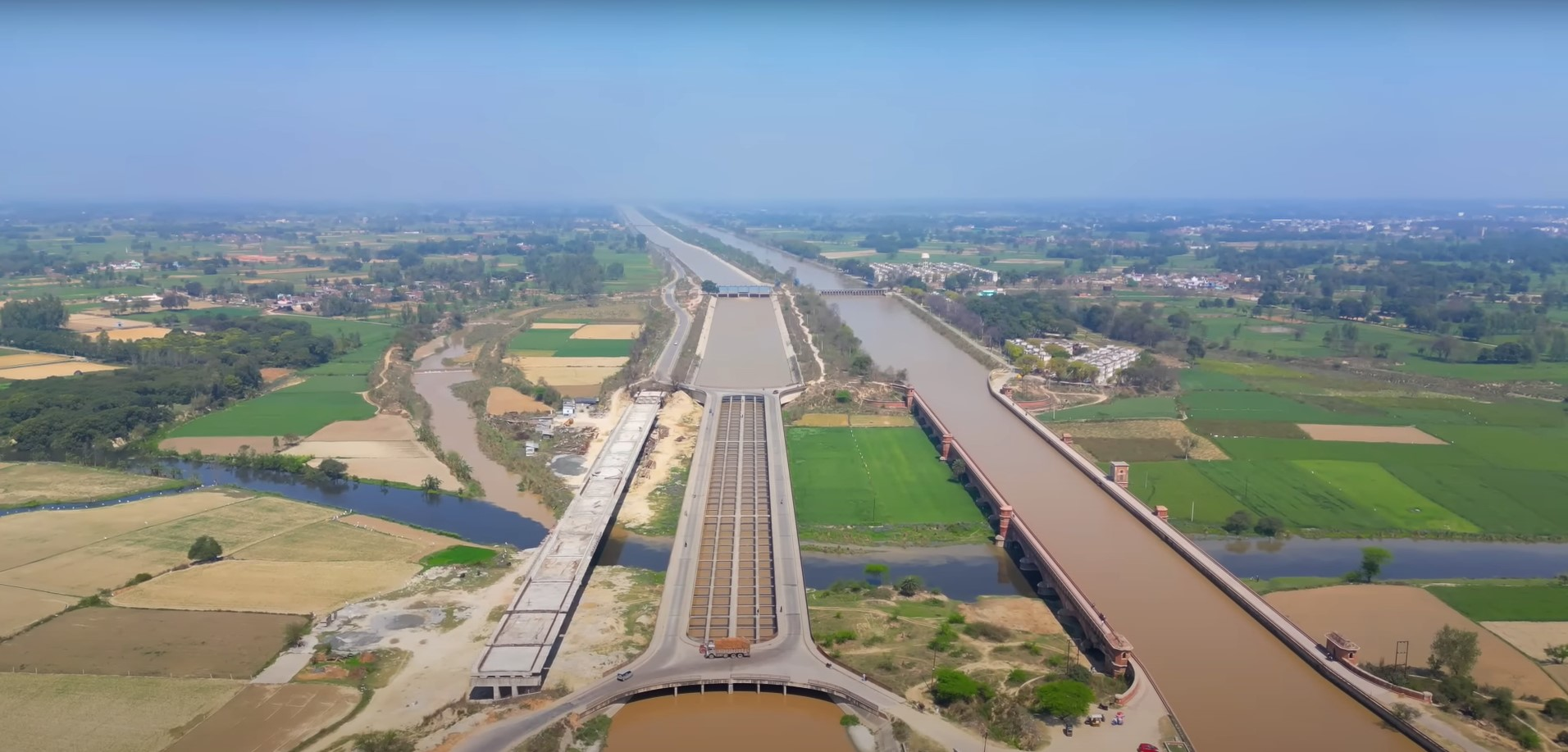
Solani Aqueduct Of Ganges Canal

India's first aqueduct was constructed over the Solani river, near Roorkee as part of the Ganges Canal project, which itself was India's first irrigation work in North India. In 1851, the Solani Aqueduct Railway was built by Proby Cautley in Roorkee to transport construction materials for the Ganges canal. It was operated by the Bengal Sappers. A steam engine, Jenny Lind, (specially shipped from England moved on rails in India), pulled a freight train that ran in Roorkee on 22 December 1851 between Roorkee and Piran Kaliyar, 10 km (6.2 mi) from the city, two years before the first passenger trains were started between Bombay and Thana in 1853 and 14 years after the first freight trains ran in Chennai in 1837. A replica of what the locomotive is thought to have looked like is exhibited at Roorkee Railway Station.

The municipality of Roorkee was created in 1868. It had been home to the Bengal Sappers and Miners since 1853, and two artillery units were stationed there. Today, the Roorkee Cantonment has a large army base. The Bengal Engineering Group and Centre (BEG&C) are still there today.

In 1901, when the city had a population of 17,197, it was made the headquarters of the Roorkee Tehsil, in the Saharanpur district of the United Province of the British Raj; the tehsil included 426 villages (of the parganas of Jwalapur, Manglaur and Bhagwanpur) and six towns, the most important among them being Haridwar and Manglaur. The Old Cemetery in the city is a protected monument, by the Archaeological Survey of India.

== Geography ==
Roorkee is located at 29.87°N 77.88°E. It has an average elevation of 268 metres (879 ft).

Roorkee is 184.3 kilometres (114.5 mi) north of the Indian capital, New Delhi, between the rivers Ganges and Yamuna, close to the foothills of the Himalayas. It is 65 kilometres away from Dehradun (the capital of Uttarakhand), 30 km (19 mi) from Haridwar and 48 km (30 mi) away from Muzaffarnagar. Before the creation of Uttarakhand on 9 November 2000, Roorkee was a part of the state of Uttar Pradesh.

The city is located in the Roorkee plain which is composed of recent alluvium with a gentle slope. As per the census of 2011, the region is spread over 129.88 km^{2} (50.15 sq mi).

There are a total of 106 villages in the Roorkee community development block of Hardwar. The total population of Roorkee block is 301,268 with a male population of 158,879 and a female population of 142,389. There are 51,329 households in Roorkee block.

== Climate ==
Roorkee has a monsoon-influenced humid Sub-Tropical climate (Köppen Cwa), typical of the northern Indo-Gangetic plain. There are three seasons. A sweltering, dry “hot” season begins in mid-March and extends until mid-June with steadily increasing humidity and discomfort. From mid-June until the end of September the southwest monsoon gives the “wet” season with a total of around 770 millimetres (30 in) of rainfall or about-four-fifths of the annual total. This monsoonal rain is accompanied by hot temperatures, very warm mornings, and extremely uncomfortable humidity. From early October the “cool” season begins as the monsoon retreats, featuring warm to very warm afternoons, cool mornings, and moderate humidity. Occasionally western disturbances between January and March will bring a little rainfall during this season, although the average total from October to March is only 145 millimetres or 5.7 inches.

Climate data for Roorkee (1991–2020, extremes 1901–2012)
Month	Jan	Feb	Mar	Apr	May	Jun	Jul	Aug	Sep	Oct	Nov	Dec	Year
Record high °C (°F)	30.1 (86.2)	31.9 (89.4)	39.0 (102.2)	43.8 (110.8)	47.4 (117.3)	46.7 (116.1)	45.0 (113.0)	39.8 (103.6)	38.3 (100.9)	38.3 (100.9)	33.9 (93.0)	30.5 (86.9)	47.4 (117.3)
Mean daily maximum °C (°F)	19.1 (66.4)	23.6 (74.5)	29.6 (85.3)	35.4 (95.7)	38.0 (100.4)	37.2 (99.0)	33.6 (92.5)	32.9 (91.2)	32.5 (90.5)	31.4 (88.5)	27.1 (80.8)	22.1 (71.8)	30.0 (86.0)
Mean daily minimum °C (°F)	6.4 (43.5)	9.2 (48.6)	14.1 (57.4)	18.9 (66.0)	23.1 (73.6)	24.9 (76.8)	25.4 (77.7)	24.9 (76.8)	23.4 (74.1)	18.0 (64.4)	11.8 (53.2)	7.7 (45.9)	16.9 (62.4)
Record low °C (°F)	−1.1 (30.0)	−2.2 (28.0)	2.8 (37.0)	7.2 (45.0)	11.1 (52.0)	16.1 (61.0)	18.8 (65.8)	19.0 (66.2)	15.2 (59.4)	8.9 (48.0)	2.2 (36.0)	−0.7 (30.7)	−2.2 (28.0)
Average rainfall mm (inches)	27.7 (1.09)	45.9 (1.81)	26.5 (1.04)	10.1 (0.40)	23.6 (0.93)	82.6 (3.25)	263.6 (10.38)	280.6 (11.05)	192.8 (7.59)	14.3 (0.56)	2.5 (0.10)	9.4 (0.37)	979.7 (38.57)
Average rainy days	1.8	3.2	1.7	1.1	2.2	4.2	8.9	10.8	6.6	1.0	0.4	1.1	42.9
Average relative humidity (%) (at 17:30 IST)	68	59	47	39	40	51	72	76	72	62	65	66	60
Source: India Meteorological Department

== Demographics ==
The Roorkee Tehsil is the most populous among the three Tehsils in the Haridwar District with 45% of its population categorized as urban. According to the 2011 census Roorkee city has a population of 504,700, within the area of 8.11 square kilometres. The average literacy rate of Roorkee is 89.48%. The sex ratio of the town as-of 2011, is 863 for all age groups while between the age 0–6 it is 820.

=== Languages ===
The major languages spoken in Roorkee are Hindi 72%, Urdu 23%, Punjabi 3%, and English 2%.

== Government and politics ==
For administrative purposes, the Roorkee city is part of the Haridwar district's Roorkee Tehsil. The city falls under the Roorkee Legislative Assembly constituency, which is one of the seventy electoral Uttarakhand Legislative Assembly constituencies of Uttarakhand state in India.

=== Civic administration ===
The governance of Roorkee city is done by the Roorkee Municipal Corporation (RMC) which falls under Roorkee Metropolitan Region. According to the 2011 census, the RMC covers an areas of 28.91 km^{2} (11.16 sq mi) with a 1.84 lakh population. The RMC is administered through the Uttar Pradesh Municipal Corporation Act 1959, which was adopted and amended by Uttarakhand. The act is administered by the Urban Development Department (UDD), part of the Government of Uttarakhand.

The council is formed every five years through ward councillors's elections and it holds the highest authority within the Urban Local Body (ULB) to make decisions. The council is headed by a Mayor, who is elected by the Ward Councillors from 40 municipal wards. A Municipal Commissioner (MC) is appointed by the state who is responsible for the operations of the ULB. The RMC is responsible for city related civic services like cleanliness of the city, solid waste management, maintenance of gardens/dividers/circles, street light, bio-medical waste, and all storm water and wastewater drainage.

=== Politics ===
The RMC has 40 wards with a voter population of 14.05 lakh voters- split between nearly 7.26 lakh men and 6.79 lakh women voters. The major political parties which are active in the local elections are Bhartiya Janta Party (BJP), Indian National Congress (INC), Bahujan Samaj Party (BSP).

== Economy ==
Roorkee is an industrial base of Haridwar district. It is partially industrialized. Its main industries are ship part manufacturing, surveying, drawing and mechanical instrument manufacturing. It has a GDP of US$112 million.

== See also ==
- Belra
- Kaliyar Sharif
