= Chilla (retreat) =

Spiritual practice in Sufism

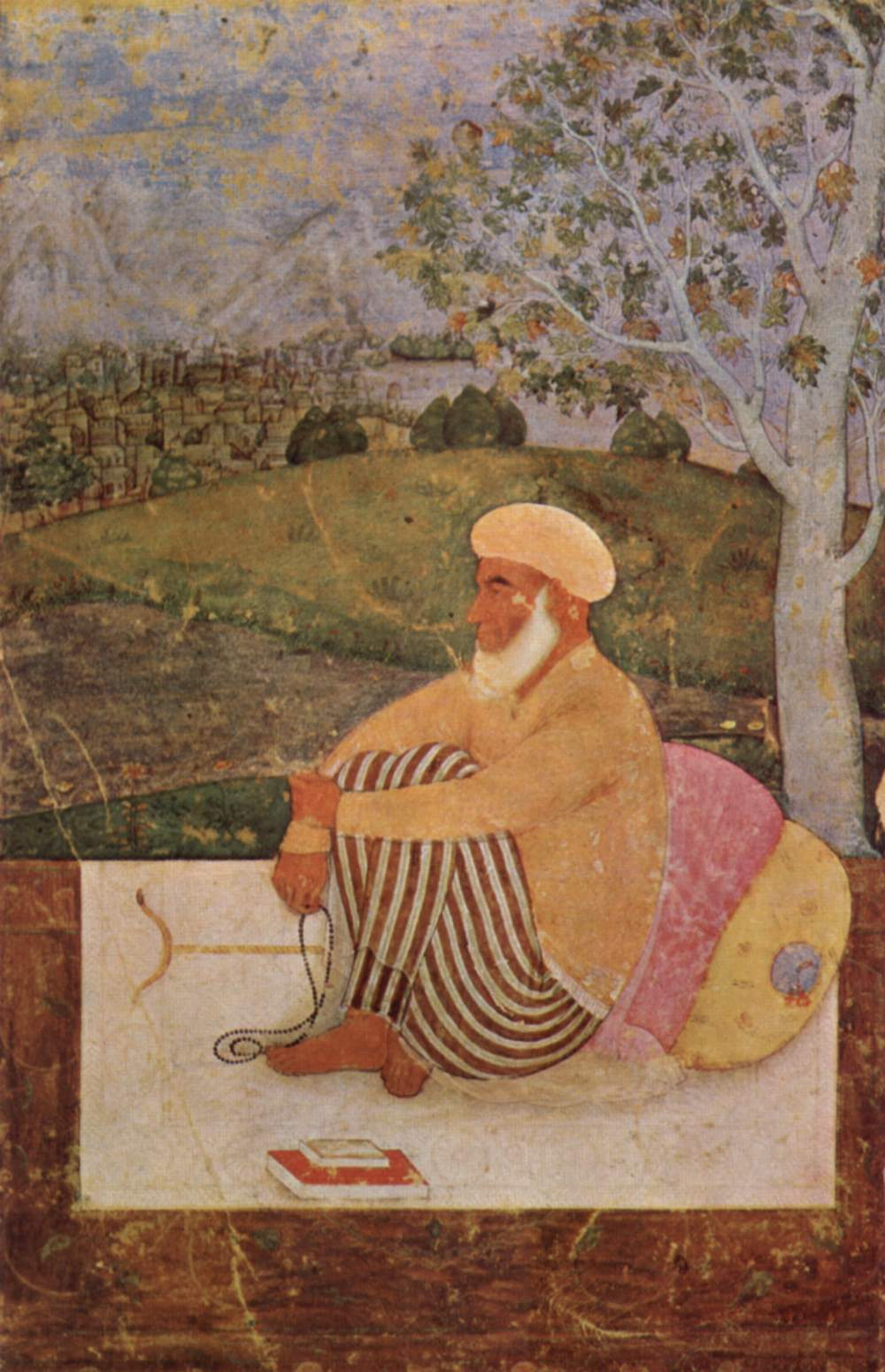
Sufi Maulvi (teacher) meditating

Chilla (Persian: چله, Arabic: أربعين, both literally "forty"), also known as Chilla-nashini, is a spiritual practice of penance and solitude in Sufism known mostly in Indian and Persian traditions. In this ritual a mendicant or ascetic attempts to remain seated in a circle practicing meditation techniques without food for 40 days and nights in imitation of the Arba'een.

== Etymology ==
The word chilla is derived from the Persian word chehel "forty".

== Chilla-khana ==
Chilla is commonly performed in a solitary cell called a chilla-khana. The place itself is sometimes called Chilla where chilla has been performed.

== Incidents of Chilla ==
The most famous case of chilla is found in the biographies of the 14th century Sufi poet Hafez of Shiraz.

== In music ==
A practice similar to chilla is also performed by Hindustani classical music practitioners at an advanced level. It is called chilla katna.

== See also ==
- Khalwa
- Meditation
- Sādhanā
- Shugendō
- Tabligh Jamaat
