= Lunkaransar =

Lunkaransar Loonkaransar
- Town

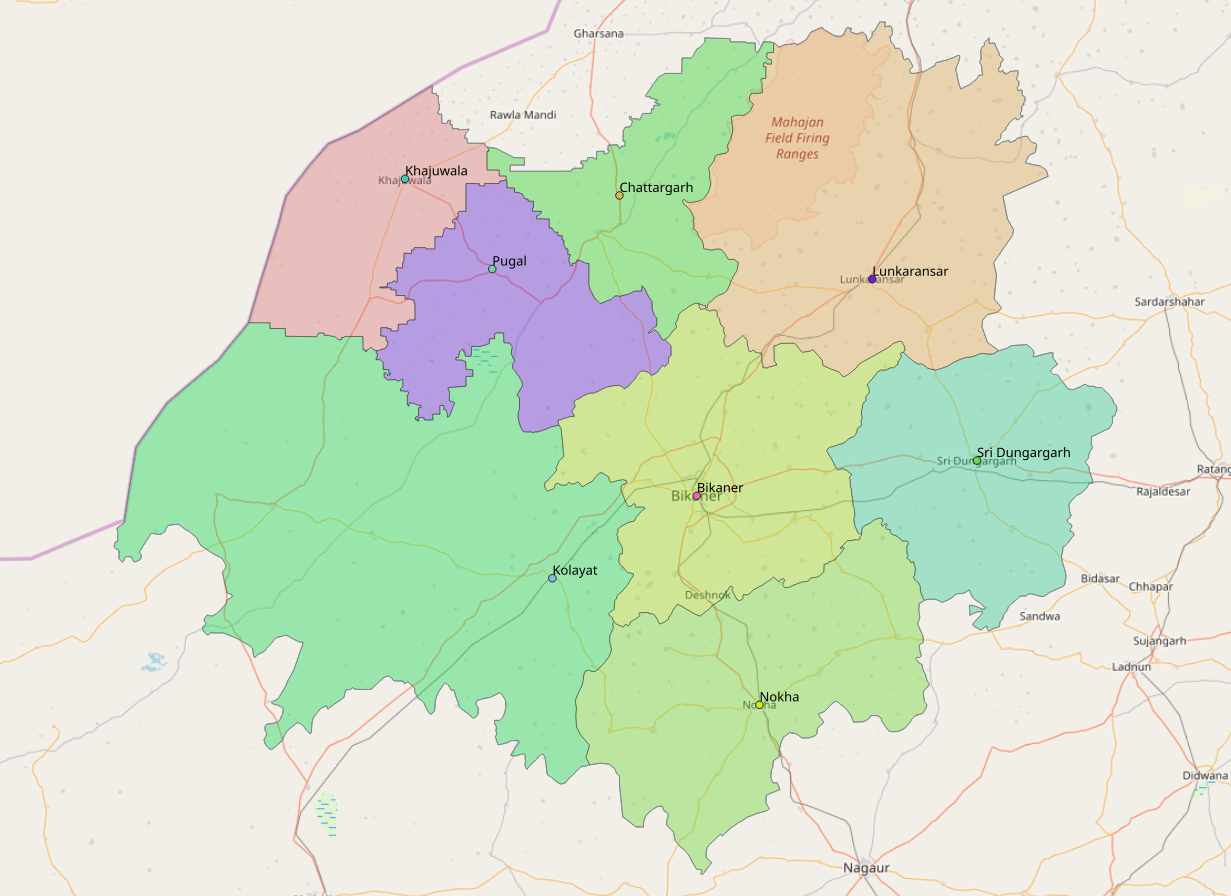
- Location in Rajasthan, India Lunkaransar (Rajasthan) Lunkaransar (India)
- Coordinates: 28.4950°N 73.7484°E
- Country: India
- State: Rajasthan
- District: Bikaner
- Elevation: 191 m (627 ft)

Population (2011)
  - Total: 213,627

Languages
  - Official: Hindi, English
  - Regional: Bagri language (बागड़ी))
- Time zone: UTC+5:30 (IST)
- PIN: 334603
- Telephone code: 01528
- ISO 3166 code: RJ-IN
- Vehicle registration: RJ-07

Lunkaransar is a town, near city of Bikaner in the Bikaner district of Indian state of Rajasthan. Lunkaransar lake in Rajasthan is a playa lake formed due to deflation. Lunkaransar is most popular for Peanuts in Rajasthan.

Lunkaransar is a Sub division and tehsil headquarters in Bikaner District. Salt is called "Lun" in the local Rajasthani language. There once was a salt lake at this location. It is dry now. Lunkaransar is located on the Bikaner-Sri Ganganagar road (National Highway 62). It is famous for peanut crop production, therefore it is called Rajkot of Rajasthan. Its land and weather are suitable for oily crops. Jojoba plantation has been established. A Government olive oil refinery also been established. An olive oil plantation of 500 hectares is in production.

== Demographics ==
As of 2011 India census, Lunkaransar had a population of 213,627. Males constitute 111,409 of the population and females 102,218.

In 2001, literacy rate in Lunkaransar stood at 61 percent of which male and female were 73 percent and 49 percent literate respectively. Overall literacy rate in the sub district has increased by 13 percent. Male literacy has gone up by 10 percent and female literacy rate has gone up by 18 percent.The total number of villages under lunkaransar is 125.

Major villages are

- Lunkaransar
- Napasar
- Kaloo
- Mahajan, a sub-tehsil
- Jaitpur
- Arjunsar
- Sherpura
- Sui
- Bamanwali
- Dhani Bhopala Ram
- Surnana
- Rojhan
- Kankadwala
- Hariyasar
- Sahajrasar
- Kujti
- Khari
- Kharda
- Hapasar
- Dhereran
- Malakisar
- Hansera

== Economy ==
An olive oil refinery is located in the area. It is the first such refinery to be started in India. The industrial area in the village comprises Ground Nut and Wheat auction during winter and Gram during summer. There are ground nut oil extracting mills in proximity to the agricultural produce market and commonly called as Dhan Mandi (Dhan = paddy and mandi = market in Hindi).
