= Banerjee =

Brahmin surname from the Indian subcontinent

Origin
- Origin: Bengali Hindu
- Region of origin: Bengal

Banerjee, also known as Bandyopadhyay, is a Bengali Kulin Brahmin surname originating from the Bengal region of the Indian subcontinent. The surname belongs to the Rarhi clan of the Hindu Bengali Brahmin caste.

== Meaning ==
The name is derived from the village of Bandoghati, combined with the honorific suffix "Upadhyay," meaning teacher or priest. Therefore, Bandyopadhyay literally translates to "teacher from Bandoghati." It signifies a lineage of learned individuals traditionally involved in religious and educational pursuits. Associated names and variants include Banerjee, Bandopadhyay, and Bannerjee.

== History ==
Indian (Bengal) and Bangladeshi: Hindu (Brahman) name, the first element of which, Ban-, is taken from Bandyopadhyay The final element -jee is derived from jha (greatly reduced form of Sanskrit upadhyaya "teacher"); thus, Banerjee "teacher who is head and only performs the main work aarti" or, Vandana. A Sanskrit version of this name, Vandyopadhyaya, was coined from the elements vandya "venerable" + upadhyaya "teacher".

— Dictionary of American Family Names

== Notable people ==
Notable people with the surname Banerjee, Bandopadhyay, or variations, include:

- Abhijit Banerjee (born 1961), Nobel laureate economist
- Abhishek Banerjee (actor)
- Abhishek Banerjee (politician)
- Ajit Kumar Banerjee, environmentalist
- Alapan Bandyopadhyay (born 1961), IAS officer
- Albion Rajkumar Banerjee (1871–1950), Indian civil servant and administrator
- Ambica Banerjee (1928–2013), member of the 15th Lok Sabha
- Amit Banerjee (disambiguation), multiple people
- Anjan Bandyopadhyay (1965–2021), journalist
- Audrish Banerjee (born 1975), Indian former cricketer
- Bhanu Banerjee (1920–1983), actor and freedom activist
- Beena Banerjee, Actress
- Bibhutibhushan Bandyopadhyay (1895–1950), Indian writer
- Bidisha Bandyopadhyay (born 1978), writer, broadcaster
- Bratati Bandyopadhyay, elocutionist
- Chitra Banerjee Divakaruni (born 1956), Indian-born American author, poet, and professor
- Dibakar Banerjee (born 1969), Indian film director, screenwriter, producer and advertisement-filmmaker
- Dola Banerjee (born 1980), Indian sportswoman who competes in archery
- Durgadas Bannerjee, Indian actor
- Gargi Banerjee, Indian cricketer
- Gauri Rani Banerjee, Indian social worker
- Gooroodas Banerjee (1844–1918), aka Gurudas Bandyopadhyay, Bengali Indian High Court judge
- Gurudas Banerjee, actor
- Gopeshwar Banerjee (1880–1963), Indian classical singer and musicologist
- Haradhan Bandopadhyay (1926–2013) a Bengali Indian actor
- Ishwar Chandra Bandyopadhyay (1820–1891), Indian educator and social reformer
- Jenni Banerjee (born 1981), Finnish actress with Indian ancestry
- John Banerjee (1873–1957), the second non-European bishop of the Church of India, Burma and Ceylon
- Kali Banerjee, Indian actor
- Kali Charan Banerjee, Indian politician
- Kali S. Banerjee, mathematician
- Kalyan Banerjee (politician)
- Kalyan Banerjee (homoeopath)
- Kanika Bandyopadhyay (1924–2000), singer
- Kanu Banerjee (1905–1985), actor (Pather Panchali)
- Karuna Banerjee (1919–2001), actress (Pather Panchali)
- Krishna Mohan Banerjee, Bengali scholar
- Kaushik Banerjee, actor
- Kaustav Banerjee, American electrical engineer
- Kedareswar Banerjee, physicist
- Mamata Banerjee, politician and chief minister of West Bengal
- Manik Bandopadhyay, writer and novelist
- Mrinal Banerjee, politician
- Nikhil Banerjee, composer and musician
- Nyra Banerjee, Indian television actress and assistant director
- Paran Bandopadhyay, actor
- Pradip Kumar Banerjee, footballer, coach
- Prith Banerjee, Indian computer scientist
- Pooja Banerjee, television actress
- Pratyusha Banerjee, television actress
- Puja Banerjee, film and television actress
- Pulak Bandyopadhyay, lyricist and songwriter
- Rachna Banerjee, Indian actress
- Raghab Bandyopadhyay, prose writer
- Rahul Banerjee, archer
- Rahul Banerjee, actor
- R. D. Banerji, discoverer of Mohenjo-daro, the principal site of the Indus Valley Civilisation
- Reba Bandyopadhyay (born 1972), American astronomer and science policy analyst
- Rina Banerjee
- Ruprekha Banerjee
- Satya Bandyopadhyay, actor
- Satya Banerjee, actor
- Samar Banerjee, footballer
- San Banarje, film director, producer, and photographer
- Sanjay Banerjee, Indian engineer
- Sara Banerji, writer
- Sarnath Banerjee, artist
- Sarvadaman D. Banerjee, actor and social worker
- Sarobindu Nath Banerjee, footballer
- Shakuntala Banerjee (born 1973), German journalist
- Sharadindu Bandyopadhyay
- Sid Banerjee, Indian-American pop singer, songwriter, and producer
- Steve Banerjee, arsonist, racketeer, and murderer
- Subhamita Banerjee, musician
- Subir Banerjee (born 1946), Indian actor
- Subir Kumar Banerjee (born 1939), Indian-American geophysicist
- Surendranath Banerjee, first Indian to qualify Indian Civil Service Examination
- Sushmita Banerjee, writer
- Sushovan Banerjee, physian and politician
- Subhankar Banerjee (musician)
- Subhankar Banerjee (photographer)
- Suvojit Banerjee, cricketer
- Syagnik Banerjee, scholar, author, and professor
- Tarasankar Bandyopadhyay, author, novelist
- Victor Banerjee, actor in Tollywood, Bollywood and Hollywood
- Vikram Banerjee
- Womesh Chunder Bonnerjee, first president of the Indian National Congress

== See also ==
- Bandopadhyay, alternate transliteration
