= Kalyan Banerjee =

Kalyan Banerjee may refer to:

- Kalyan Banerjee (Rotary International) (born 1942), president of Rotary International
- Kalyan Banerjee (politician) (born 1957), Indian politician
- Kalyan Banerjee (homoeopath) (born 1949), Indian homoeopath
