= Swapan Kumar Chakravorty =

Indian academic (1954–2021)

Swapan Kumar Chakravorty স্বপন কুমার চক্রবর্তী
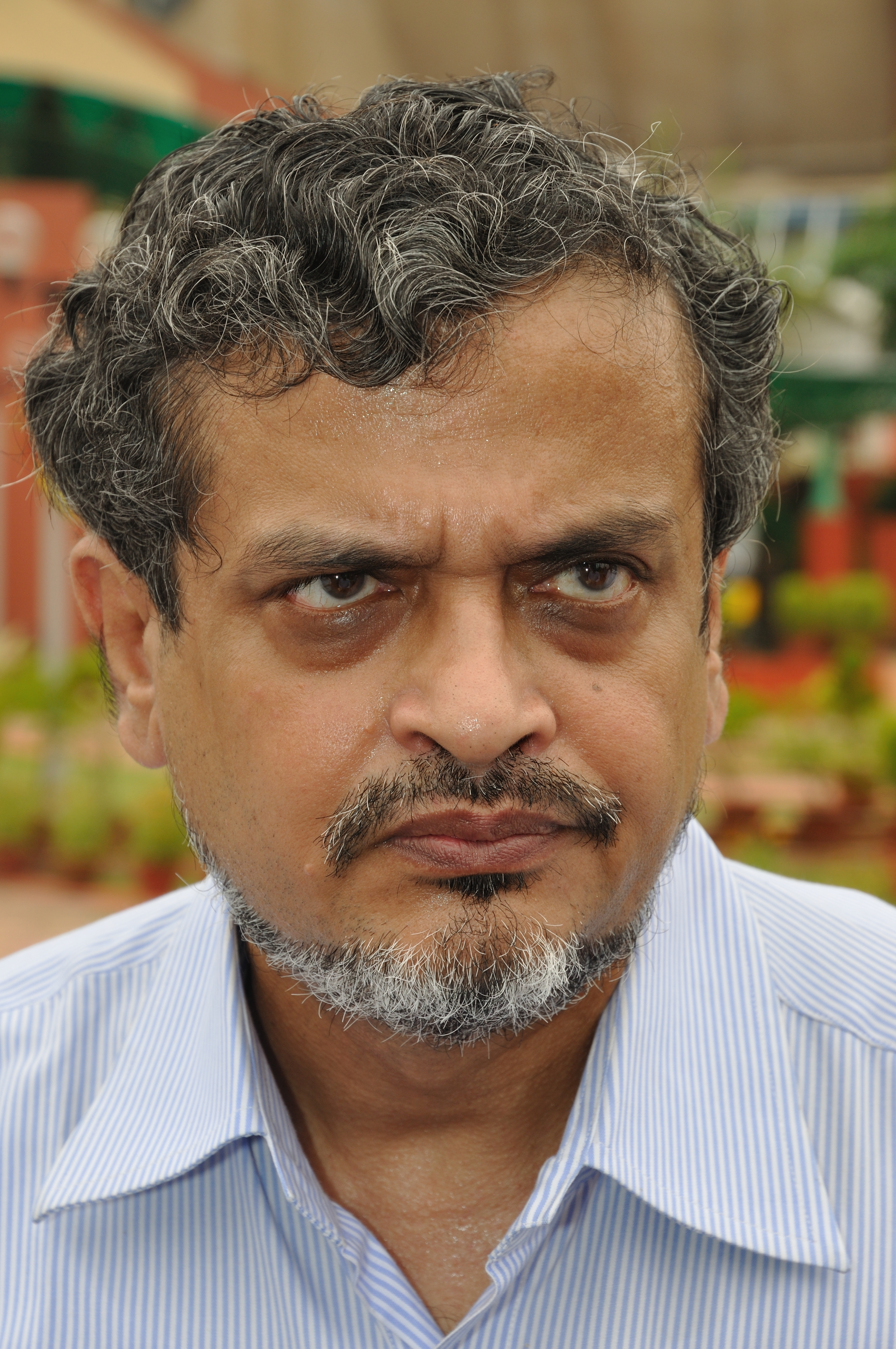
- Chakravorty in 2011
- Born: 29 July 1954
- Died: 25 September 2021 (aged 67); Kolkata, West Bengal, India
- Education: Jadavpur University
- Occupations: author, academician
- Spouse: Bhaswati Chakravoty
- Children: Saurya Chakravorty

Swapan Kumar Chakravorty (Bengali: স্বপন কুমার চক্রবর্তী; 29 July 1954 – 25 September 2021) was an Indian academic who was a distinguished Professor of Humanities at the Presidency University, Kolkata.

He also served as a Professor of English, Jadavpur University, Director General of the National Library of India along with Secretary, and Curator of the Victoria Memorial Hall. Chakravorty was chairperson of the Centre for Studies in Social Sciences, Calcutta (CSSSC), Advisor to the Vice-Chancellor on Library Matters, Ashoka University, and Distinguished Visiting Faculty, S. P. Jain School of Global Management.

== Life and career ==
An alumnus of Calcutta Boys' School, Presidency College, Kolkata and Jadavpur University, Chakravorty obtained his D. Phil. from Oxford University. He joined the English Department at Jadavpur in 1985 and was Head from 2005 to 2007. He was also at one time Joint Director, School of Cultural Texts and Records.

Chakravorty also taught at the Ramakrishna Mission Residential College, Narendrapur, the University of Calcutta, and Universiti Malaya. His visiting assignments and lectures include those at the University of Alabama, Institute of English Studies at London University, and King's College, London. He delivered the Hudson Strode Renaissance Lectures at the University of Alabama, Brajendranath Bandyopadhyay Memorial Lecture, Sunitikumar Chattopadhyay Memorial Lecture and Jitendranath Chakrabarti Memorial Lecture at Bangla Akademi, Kolkata, Sombhu Mitra Memorial Lecture of Paschimbanga Natya Akademi, Kolkata, Buddhadeva Bose Memorial Lecture of Paschimbanga Kabita Akademi, Buddhadeva Bose Memorial Lecture of CSSSC, Shakti Chattopadhyay Memorial Lecture, Sukhalata Rao Memorial Lecture, and Ranajay Karlekar Lecture at Jadavpur University, Kolkata, the Foundation Day Orations at Bangiya Sahitya Parishat and the Centre for Archaeological Research and Training, Eastern India, Kolkata, the first Sunil Gangopadhyay Memorial Lecture, the first Satyendra Prasanna Mukherjee Memorial Lecture, Bhaskar Chakraborti Memorial Lecture in Kolkata, and the first Kabindranath Phukan Memorial Lecture at Gauhati University, Guwahati. Other special lectures delivered by Chakravorty in Kolkata included Subodh Chandra Sengupta Memorial Lecture, Kalyan Maitra Memorial Lecture, and the first Raghab Bandyopadhyay Memorial Lecture.

Chakravorty died from post-COVID-19 complications on 25 September 2021.

== Books ==
- Society and Politics in the Plays of Thomas Middleton (Oxford: Clarendon Press, 1996).
- contributing editor of The Collected Works of Thomas Middleton (Oxford: Clarendon Press, 2007) and Thomas Middleton and Early Modern Textual Culture (Oxford: Clarendon Press, 2007). (General Editors: Gary Taylor et al.; awarded the distinguished Scholarly Edition Prize by the Modern Language Association, USA)
- (edited with Abhijit Gupta) Print Areas: Book History in India (New Delhi: Permanent Black, 2004) and Movable Type: Book History in India II (New Delhi: Permanent Black, 2008).
- (edited with Abhijit Gupta) Moveable Type: Book History in India (Ranikhet: Permanent Black, 2009)
- (edited with Abhijit Gupta) Founts of Knowledge: Book History in India (Hyderabad: Orient Blackswan, 2015)
- (with Tani Barlow and Suzana Milevska) Conversations with Gayatri Chakravorty Spivak (Kolkata: Seagull, 2006)
- Shakespeare (Kolkata: Papyrus, 1999)
- Bangalir ingreji sahityacharcha (Kolkata: Anustup, 2004)
- editor of Mudraner sanskriti o bangla boi (Kolkata: Ababhas, 2007). Awarded the Naransingha Dass Prize by the University of Delhi, 2010
- editor of Nameless Recognition: The Impact of Rabindranath Tagore on Other Indian Literatures (Kolkata: National Library, 2012)

== Articles ==
- Imminent ruin and desperate remedy: Calcutta and its fragments
- Obituary on Anandabazar Patrika শিক্ষাবিদ স্বপন চক্রবর্তী প্রয়াত, শোকপ্রকাশ মুখ্যমন্ত্রীর (Bengali: আনন্দবাজার পত্রিকা)
