= Ramsharan College of Music =

College in West Bengal, India

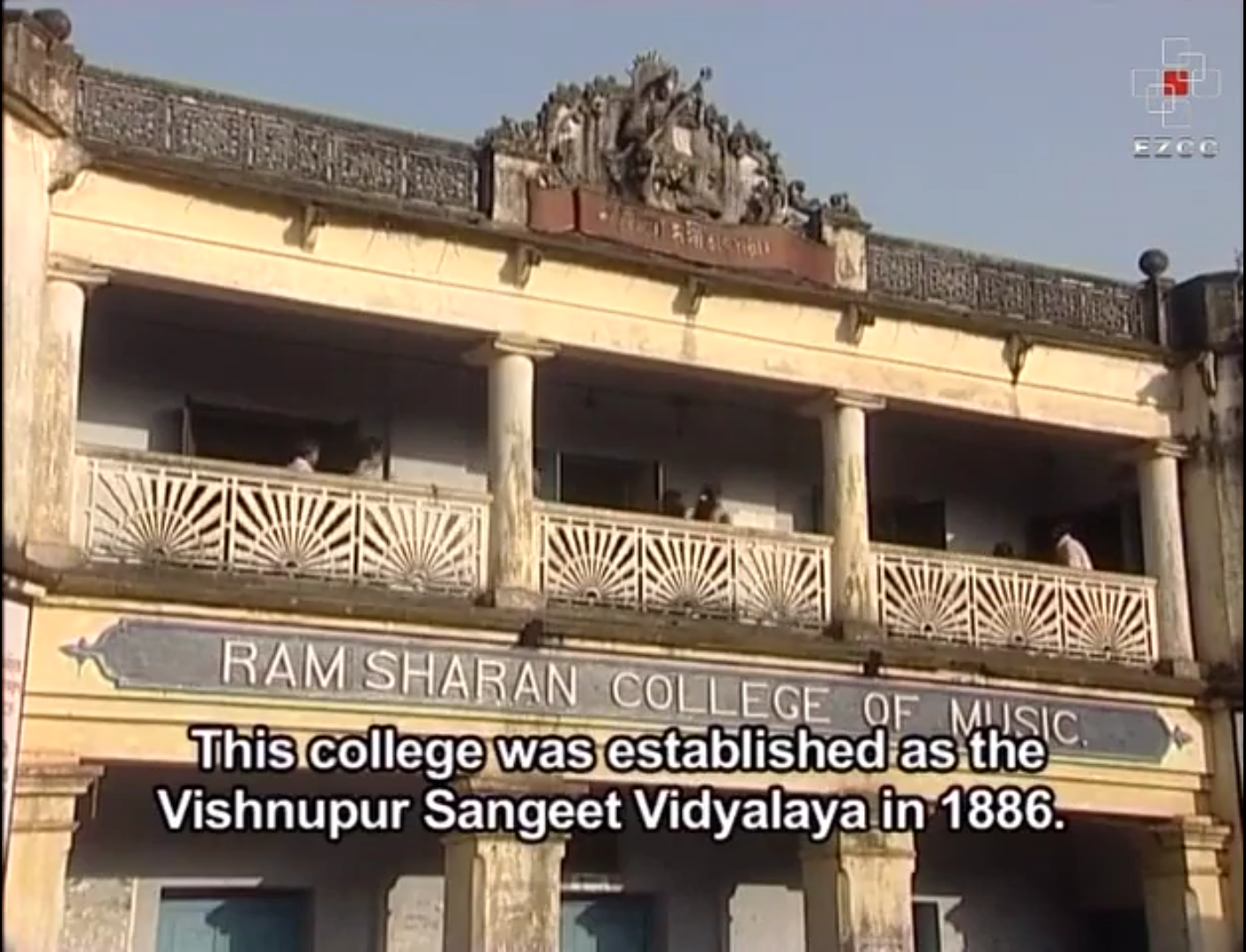
- Type: Public
- Established: 1886
- Location: Bishnupur, Bankura, West Bengal, India
- Website: Ramsharan College of Music

Ramsharan College of Music (also known as Bishnupur Sangeet Vidhyalaya and Vishnupur Sangeet Vidhyalaya ) is one of the oldest music college in Bishnupur, Bankura, West Bengal. This college was established as the Bishnupur Sangeet Vidhyalaya in 1886. It is also considered as oldest music college in India. Initially it was a music school but in 1945, this school was converted as a college by sangeet guru Ramsharan Mukhopadhyay. Presently this college offers two courses - one is certificate course of four years duration and another is diploma course of two years duration.

== History ==
Gopeshwar Bandopadhyay was disciple of Ram Shankar Bhattacharya, later became the first teacher of the residential music school of Bishnupur, Bishnupur Sangeet Vidhyalaya, later renamed Ram Saran Music College.

Principals	Year	Ref
Gopeshwar Bandopadhyay	1943	
Surendranath Bandopadhyay	-	
Dr. Debabrata Singha Thakur	-	

== In popular culture ==
The dhrupad gharana of Bishnupur kingdom

=== Film ===
- Eastern Zonal Cultural Centre, Kolkata, brings you the Fourth Documentary from 𝗢𝗻𝗹𝗶𝗻𝗲 𝗔𝗿𝗰𝗵𝗶𝘃𝗲 𝗗𝗼𝗰𝘂𝗺𝗲𝗻𝘁𝗮𝗿𝘆 𝗙𝗶𝗹𝗺 𝗙𝗲𝘀𝘁𝗶𝘃𝗮𝗹. The video is a presentation on the dhrupad gharana of Bishnupur kingdom.

== Gallery ==
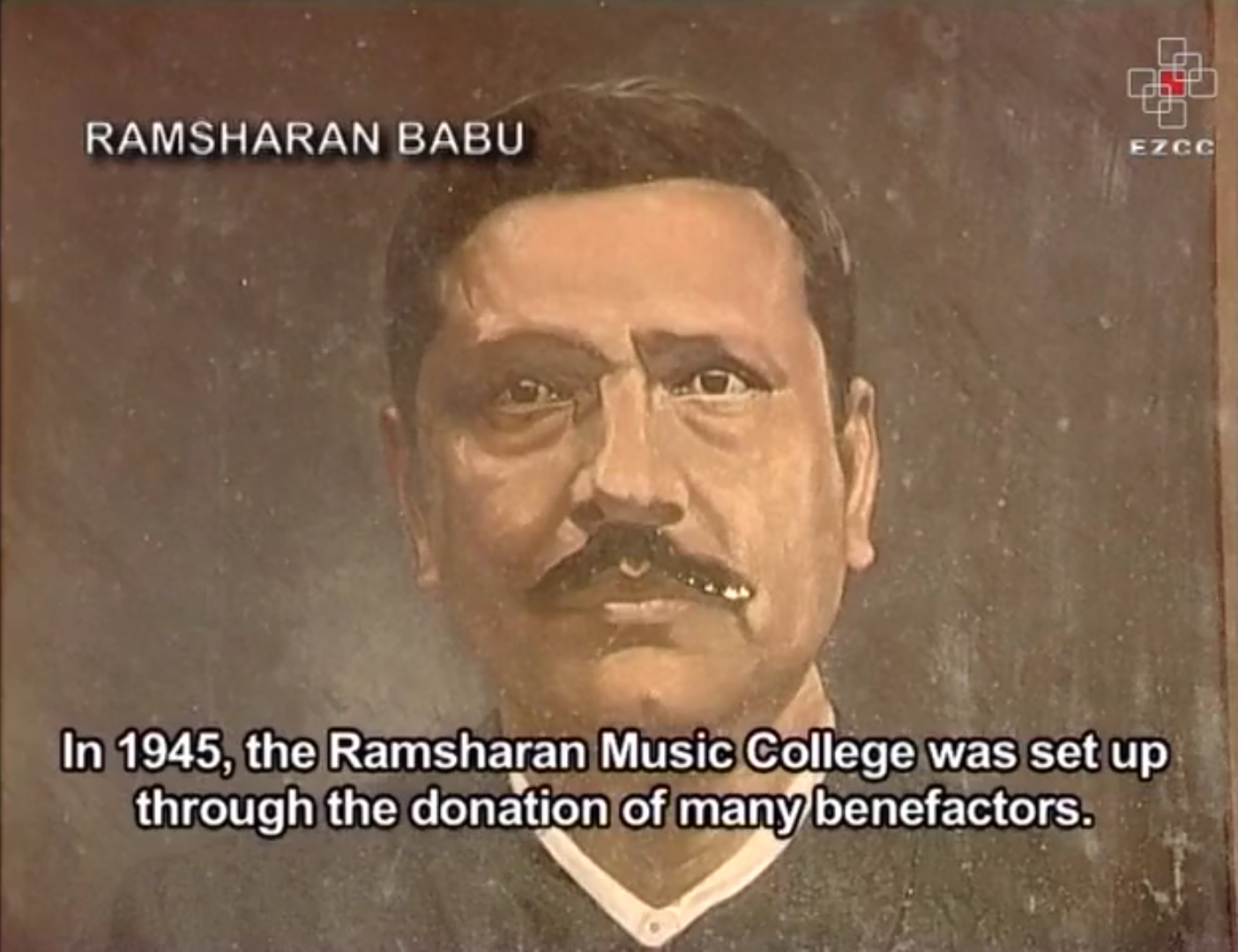
Ramsharan Mukhopadhyay

Ramsharan Mukhopadhyay memorial plaque

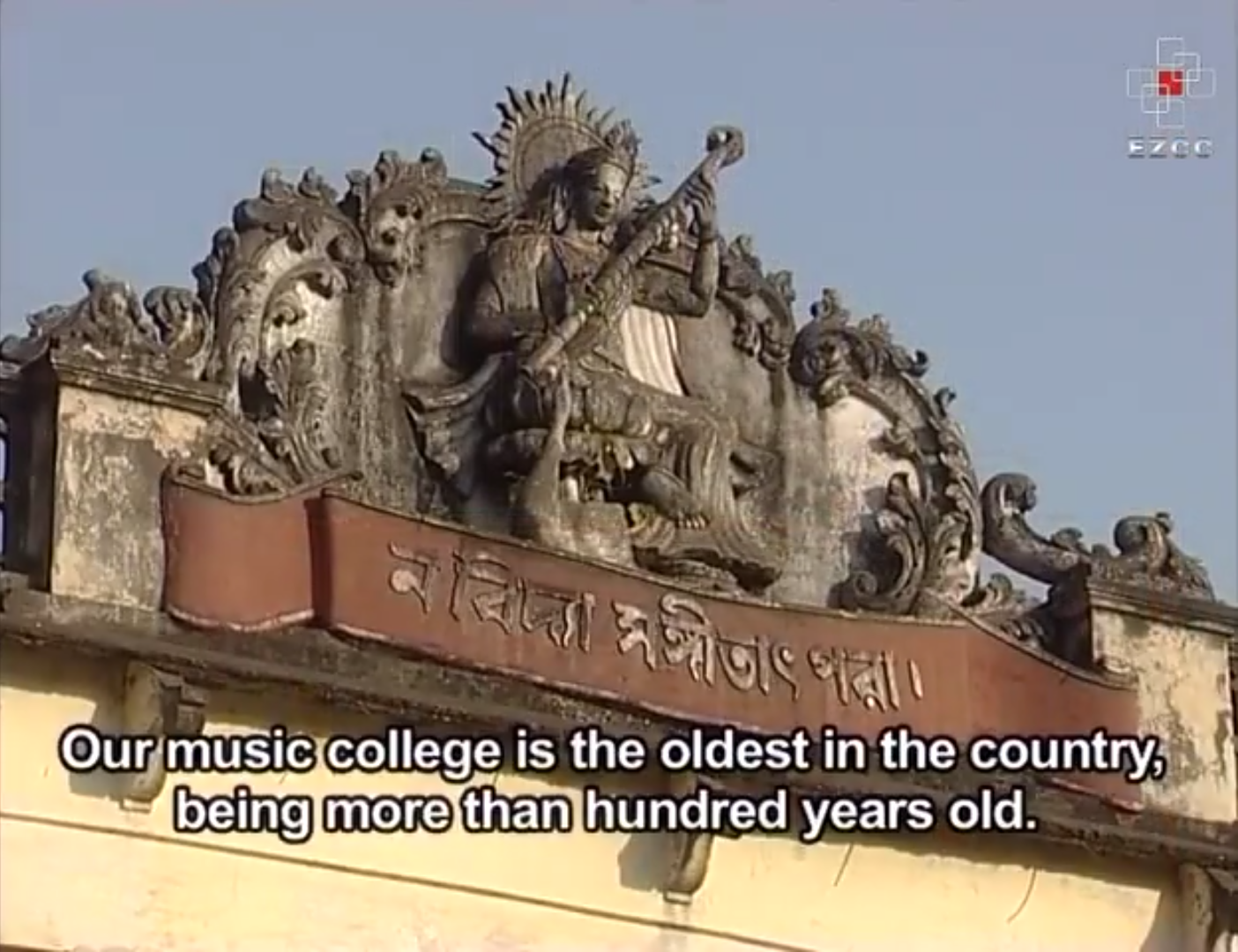
Goddesses Saraswati in the front of college building

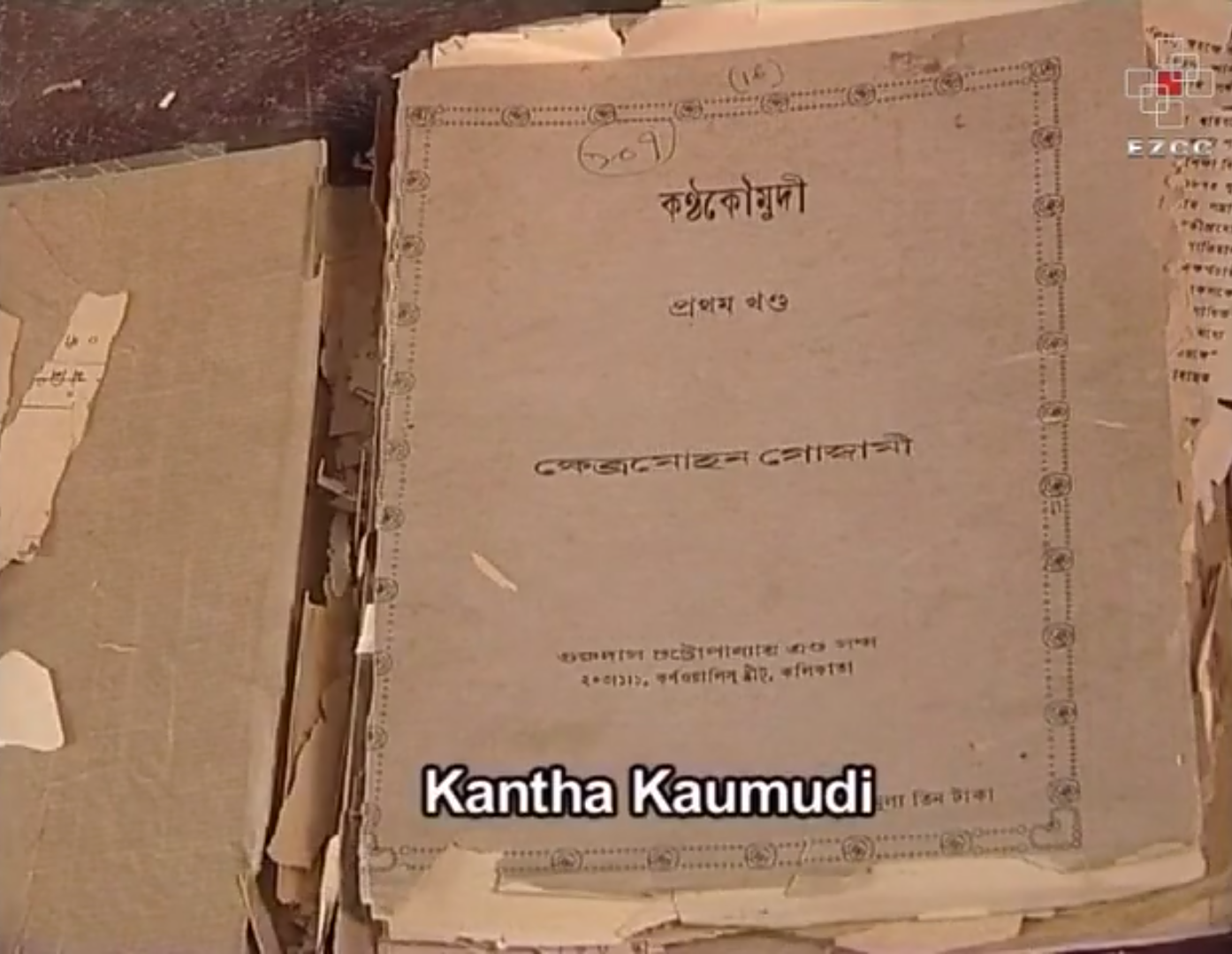
Kantha Kaumudi book in college

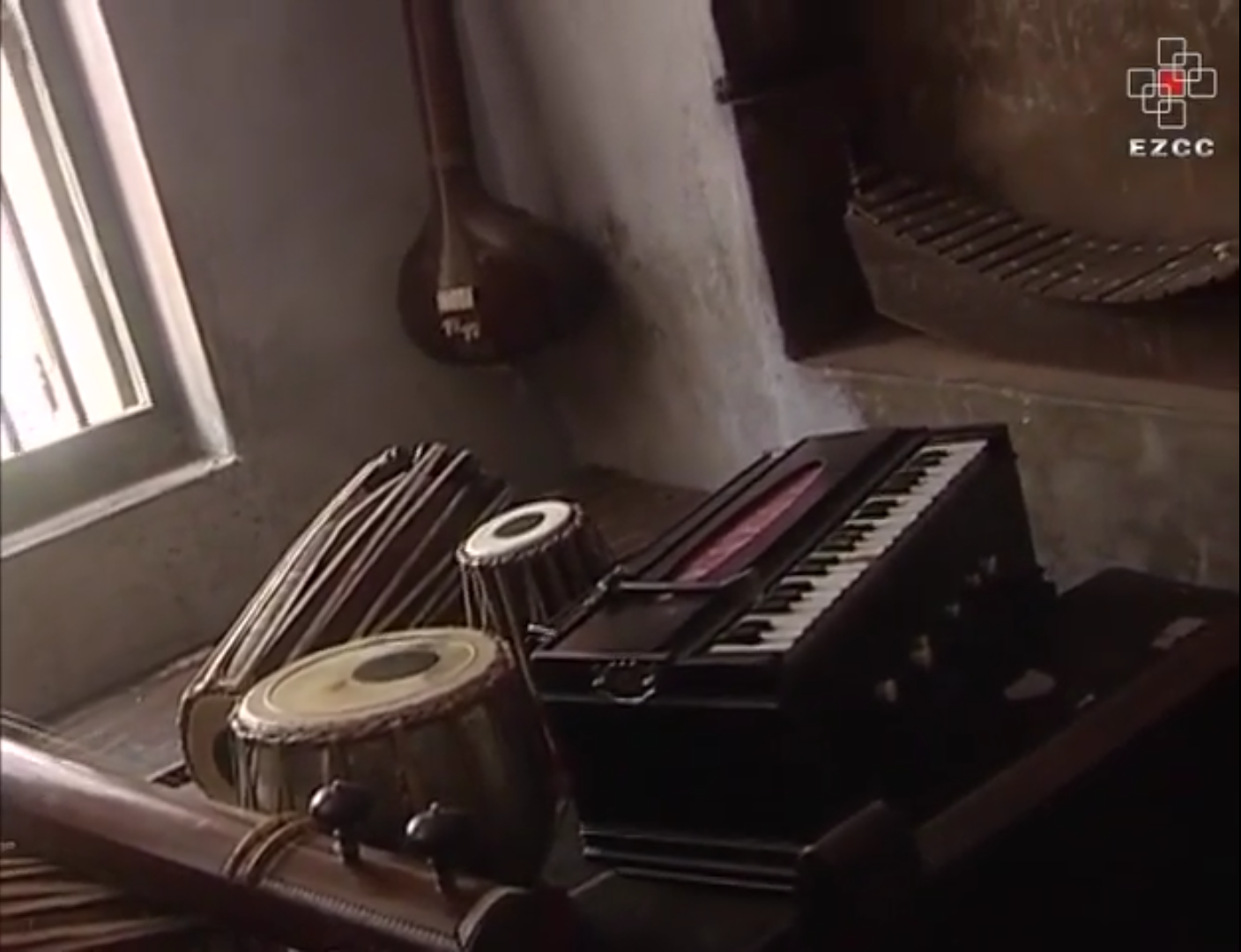
Musical instruments in college

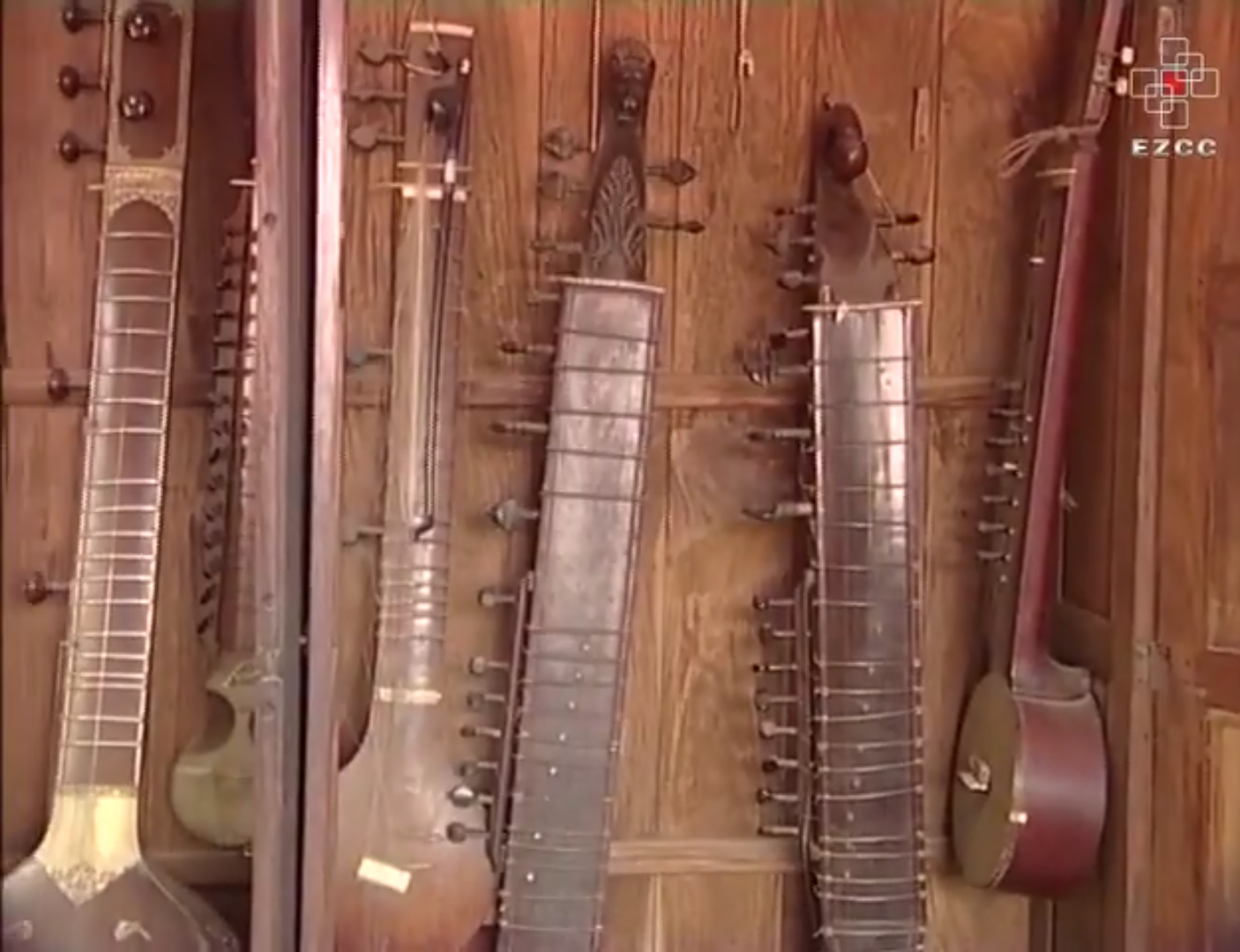
Musical instruments in college

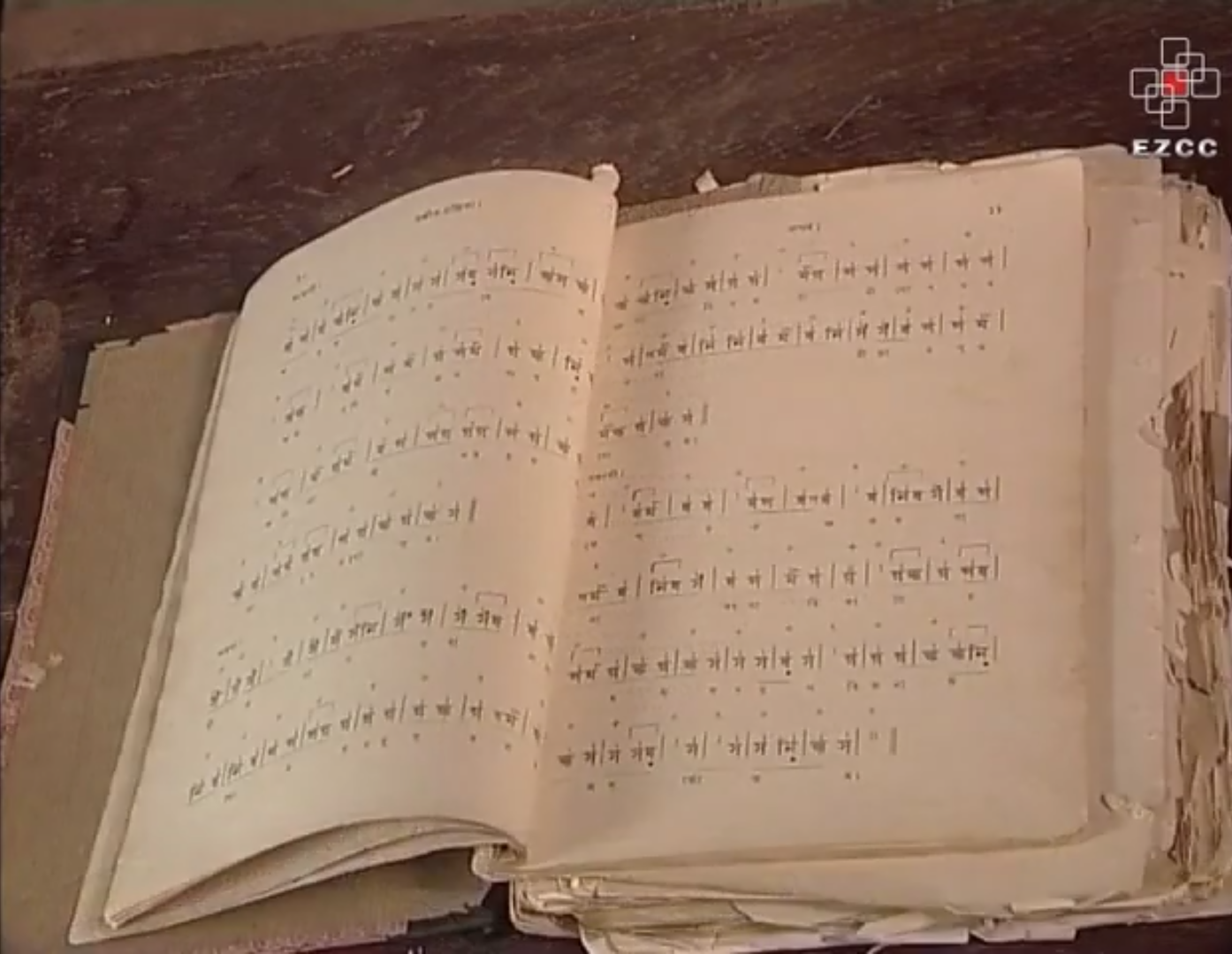
Book in college

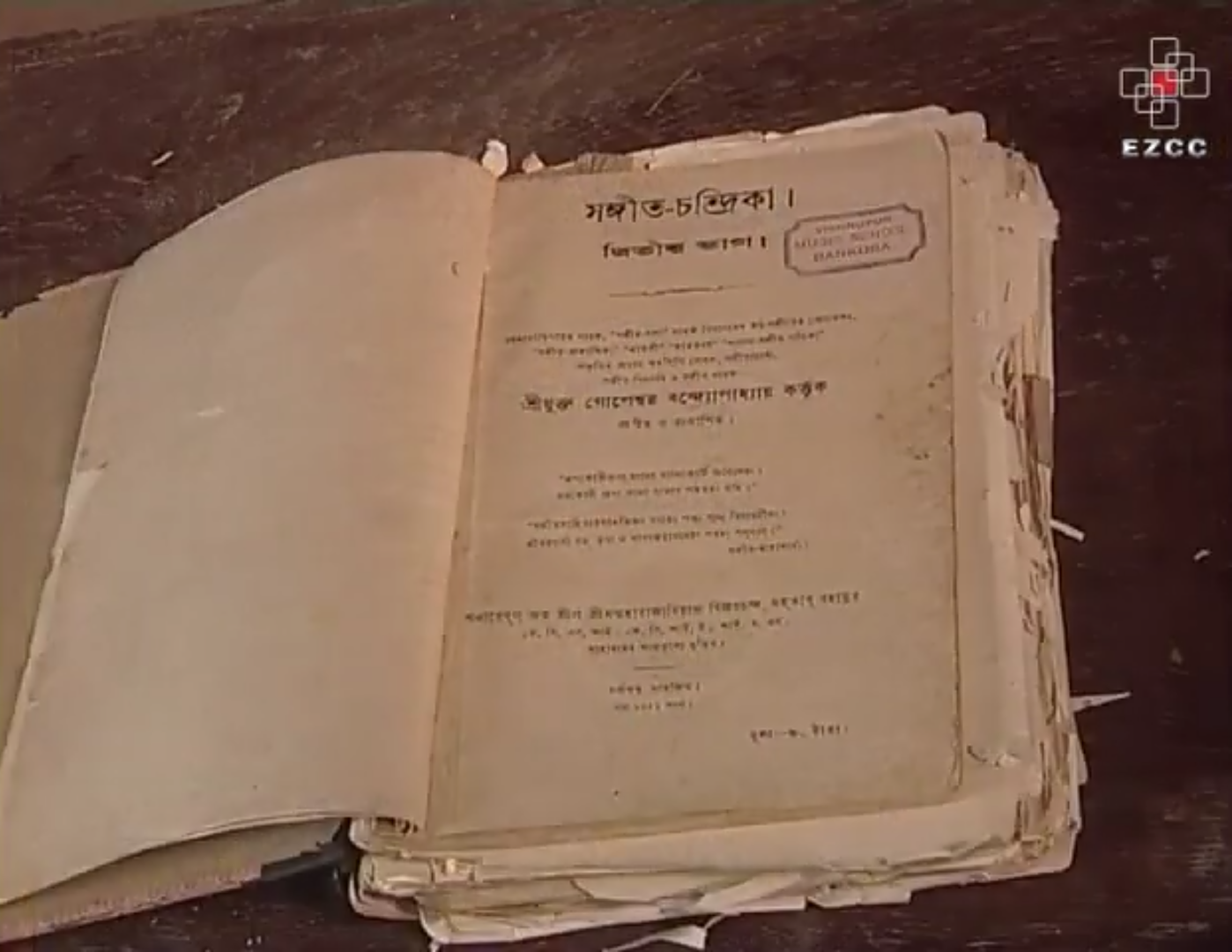
Book in college

Ramsharan College of Music

== See also ==
- Bishnupur gharana
