= Gopeshwar Banerjee =

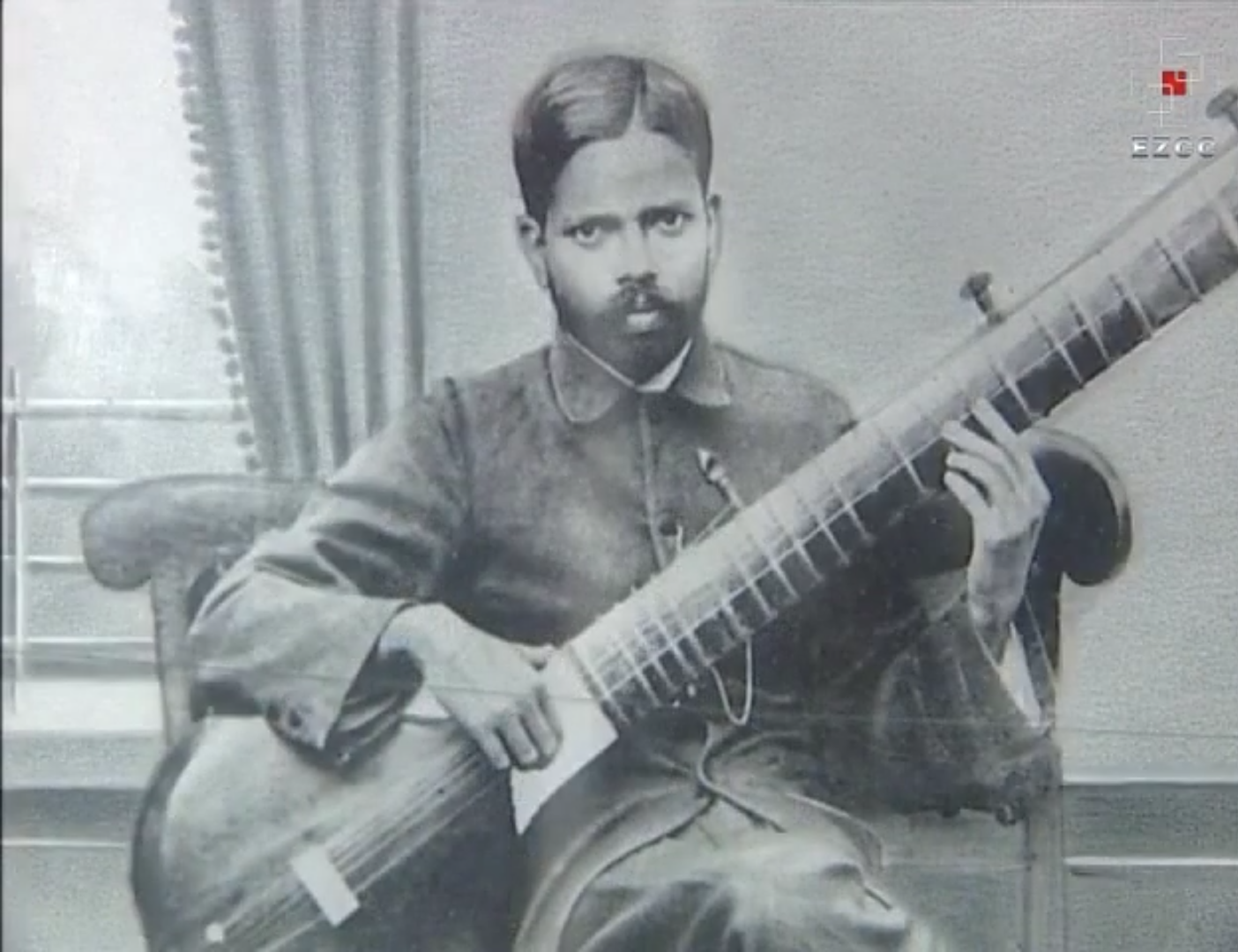

Background information
- Born: 1880; Bishnupur, Bengal Presidency, British India
- Died: 28 July 1963 (aged 82–83) Bishnupur, Bankura, West Bengal
- Genre: Hindustani classical music
- Occupations: vocalist, musicologist
- Instruments: surbahar, sitar
- Years active: 1895–1963
- Label: Gramophone Company of India

Gopeshwar Banerjee, also Gopeshwar Bandopadhyay (1880–1963), was an Indian classical singer and musicologist, belonging to Bishnupur gharana of Hindustani music, which originated in Bishnupur in West Bengal. He was known for his khyal and dhrupad renditions, besides Rabindra Sangeet. He also sang thumri, and most notably the thumri, Kon Gali Gayo Shyam, in Raga Mishra Khamaj, which he popularised. As a musicologist, he published several books of rare compositions with musical notations, including dhrupad and Rabindra Sangeet.

He started his career as a court musician of the Maharaja of Burdwan in 1895, and worked there for 29 years till 1924. Thereafter he shifted to Kolkata. Towards the end of his career, he was awarded the Sangeet Natak Akademi Fellowship in 1962, the highest honour conferred by Sangeet Natak Akademi, India's National Academy for Music, Dance and Drama.

== Early life and background ==
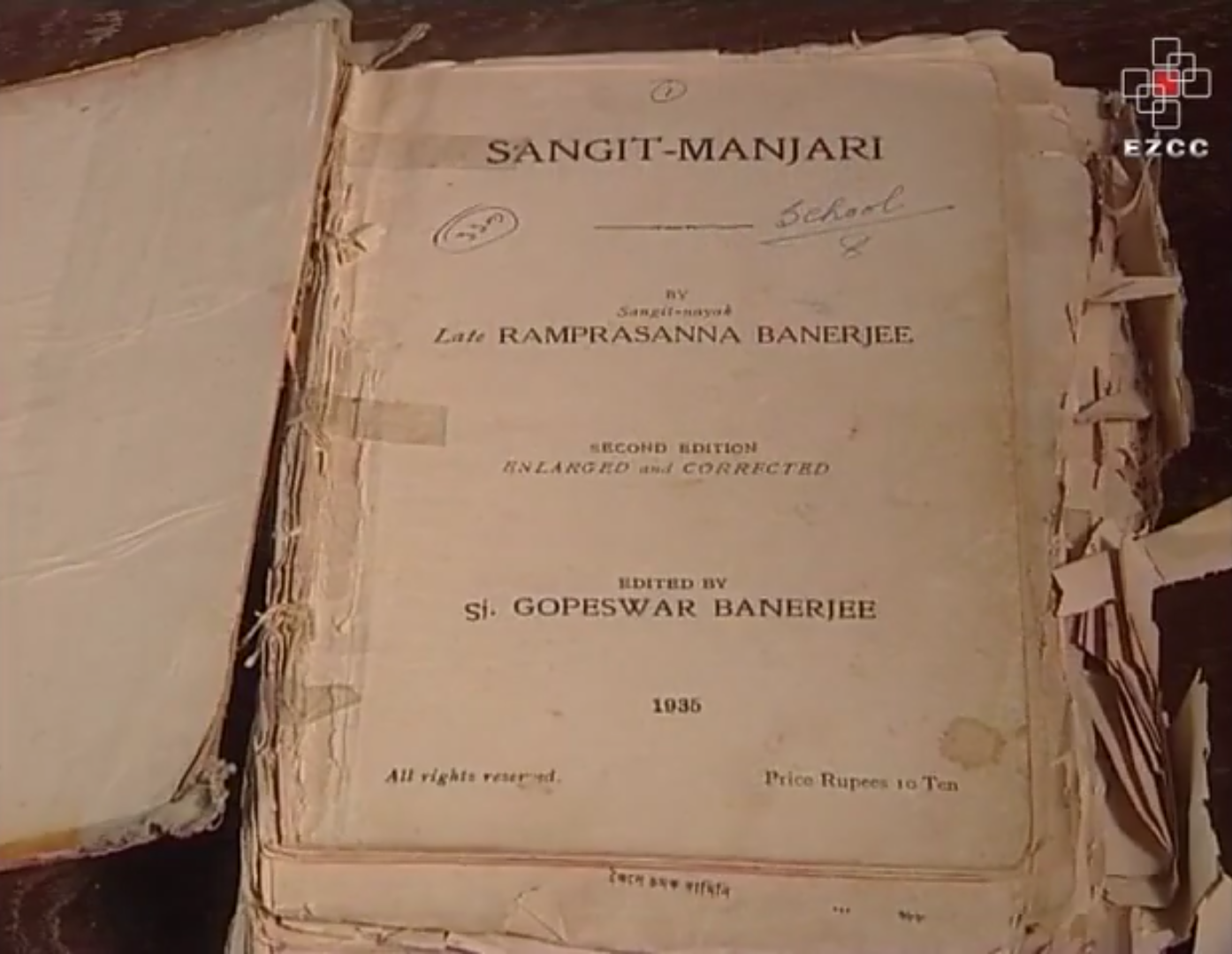
Sangit Manjari Book Edited by Gopeshwar Banerjee

Born in 1880, in Bishnupur, Bankura in Bengal He was the second son of his father Anantalal Banerjee (anglicised version of Bandopadhyay), who was court musician in of Ramkrishna Singha Dev of Bishnupur . He was disciple of Ram Shankar Bhattacharya, later became the first teacher of the residential music school of Bishnupur, Bishnupur Sangeet Vidhyalaya, later renamed Ram Saran Music College. All his three sons, Ramprasanna Banerjee, Gopeswar Banerjee and Surendranath Banerjee were all singers and also musicologists. They did valuable documentation and music notation work in the field of Indian classical music. The eldest, Ramprasanna Banerjee wrote, Sangeet Manjari (1935), which contained theoretical treatise on musical concepts, besides favoured practices in vocal recitals, and notations of various genres, like dhrupad, khyal, thumri, and tappa.

His younger brother Surendranath Banerjee was also a noted musicians and one of the pioneers of the Bishnupur gharana. Later remained Principal of the Ramsharan College of Music in Bishnupur. He died on 28 July 1963 in Bishnupur.

He received his music training from musicians of Betiya gharana of Bihar, as did another contemporary singer of the Bishnupur gharana, Radhika Prasad Goswami.

== Career ==
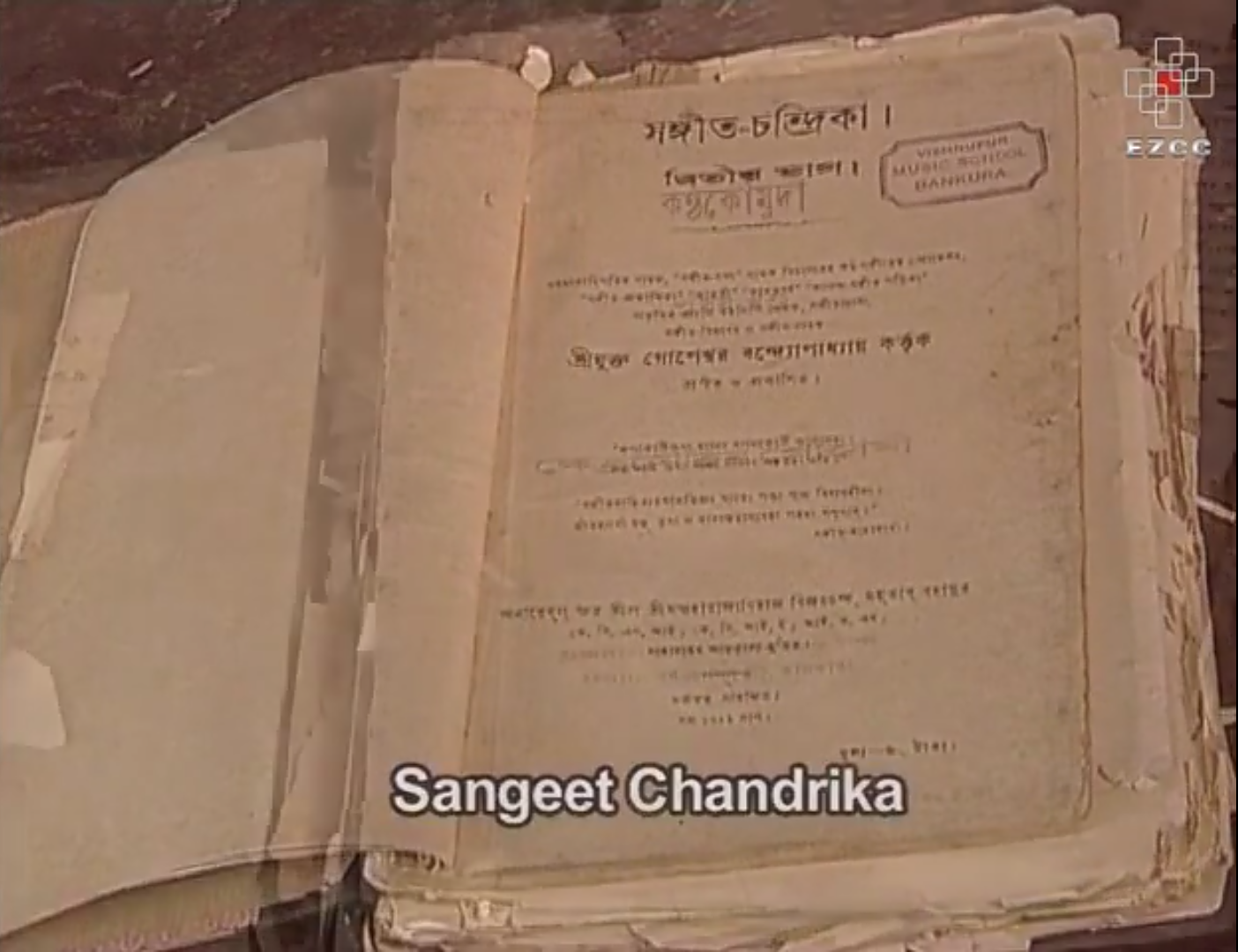
Sangeet Chandrika

Early in his career, in 1895 he was appointed a court singer, by the Maharaja of Burdwan, here he worked here for the next 29 years, till 1924. This turned out to be most fruitful period of his career. He devoted his time in the research of the theory and history of Indian music. He travelled across India with the Maharaja and became acquainted with several noted musicians of the time, which expanded his knowledge of various musical traditions and genres. He also learnt to play surbahar from Sayed Mohammed working at the court of Maharaja Jatindramohan Tagore, thereafter he also learnt sitar from Imdad Khan. His surbahar recital along with Khan, where even commercially recorded. While still in Burdwan, he published Sangita Chandrika in two volumes, an early and important study of musicology in India. It also included a collection of Bengali and Hindi songs set to music. His other books on musicology include Geet-Darpan, Geet-Praveshika and Sangeet-Lahari, all in Bengali language.

Once his term as Burdwan came to end, he shifted to Calcutta, where he spent his next 20 years, till 1943. By now from singing, in time, he had become an eminent musicologist. He along with his cousin Surendranath Banerjee, compiled a large number of Dhrupad compositions, complete with their musical notations. Later, he not just sang, but also reproduced some of the well known Rabindra Sangeet songs, that is songs composed by Rabindranath Tagore, especially those in the Dhrupadanga. Prior to 1917, Banerjee had published the first volume of Sangeet Chandrika, which included the notations for Tagore's composition, Patha ekhan kela alasita anga.

Today, he is amongst the few singers from Bengal of the period, who performed the dhrupad-genre of singing, besides Radhika Prasad Goswami, Gopal Babu and Aghor Chakravarti.

His son Ramesh Banerjee also became a singer, while his notable disciples include Rita Ganguly.

In 1962, he was awarded the Sangeet Natak Akademi Fellowship the highest honour conferred by Sangeet Natak Akademi.

== Discography ==
- Tarana – Adana Kewali (1908) – Gramophone Company, Calcutta (Hindustani)
- Langar Deet Mohe Gheri – Behag Kawali (1908) – Gramophone Company, Calcutta (Hindustani)
- Brahomomoyee Parashtopara (1908) (Bengali)

== Works ==
- Sangita-chandrika: A Treatise on Hindu music, Vol. I., 2nd Ed. Pub. Vijay Chand Mahtab Bahadur, Burdhwan. 1925.
- Sangita-chandrika: A Treatise on Hindu music, Vol. II. Pub. Vijay Chand Mahtab Bahadur, Burdhwan. 1925.
- Banerjee, Gopeswar (1927). Sangit-lahari.
- Bandyopādhyāẏa, Rāmaprasanna (1935). Sangita manjari (in Bengali). Kuntalin Press.

== In popular culture ==
The dhrupad gharana of Bishnupur kingdom

=== Film ===
- Eastern Zonal Cultural Centre, Kolkata, brings you the Fourth Documentary from 𝗢𝗻𝗹𝗶𝗻𝗲 𝗔𝗿𝗰𝗵𝗶𝘃𝗲 𝗗𝗼𝗰𝘂𝗺𝗲𝗻𝘁𝗮𝗿𝘆 𝗙𝗶𝗹𝗺 𝗙𝗲𝘀𝘁𝗶𝘃𝗮𝗹. The video is a presentation on the dhrupad gharana of Bishnupur kingdom.

== Bibliography ==
- "Gopeshwar Banerjee". Sangeet Natak, Vol. 16. Sangeet Natak Akademi. 1969. pp. 67–75.
- Santidev Ghosh (2006). Rabindra Sangeet Miscellany. Concept Publishing Company. ISBN 978-81-8069-305-2.
