= Reba Bandyopadhyay =

American astronomer and science policy analyst

- Born: 1972 (age 52–53)
- Education: MIT (BS); Oxford (DPhil)
- Scientific career
- Fields: Astronomy; Science policy
- Thesis: Infrared observations of X-ray binaries (1998)
- Doctoral advisor: Phil Charles

Reba Mithua Bandyopadhyay (born 1972) is an American science policy analyst. Formerly a professional astronomer, she works as deputy executive director of the President's Council of Advisors on Science and Technology in the US Office of Science and Technology Policy, and as legislative and science policy analyst for the National Science Board of the National Science Foundation.

== Astronomy ==
As an astronomer, Bandyopadhyay specialized in observations of the Galactic Center and of star systems containing neutron stars and black holes. She has also participated in studies of 2060 Chiron, a Solar System object combining the characteristics of comets and asteroids.

Bandyopadhyay graduated from the Massachusetts Institute of Technology in 1993. She completed a D.Phil. in 1998 at the University of Oxford in England, with the dissertation Infrared observations of X-ray binaries supervised by Phil Charles. After postdoctoral research at the Naval Research Laboratory, she worked for the Gemini Observatory from 2001 to 2004, at the observatory's Oxford office. She then became a research scientist at the University of Florida.

== Science policy ==
From 2014 to 2015 Bandyopadhyay was a science advisor in the United States Senate, advising Brian Schatz as an American Physical Society Congressional Fellow, and from 2015 to 2017 she worked for the National Science Board as an American Association for the Advancement of Science Science & Technology Policy Executive Branch Fellow, before taking her present positions as deputy executive director of the President's Council of Advisors on Science and Technology in the US Office of Science and Technology Policy, and as legislative and science policy analyst for the National Science Board of the National Science Foundation.

== Recognition ==
Bandyopadhyay was elected as a Fellow of the American Association for the Advancement of Science (AAAS) in 2021, in the AAAS Section on Astronomy. She was elected as a Fellow of the American Physical Society (APS) in 2023, after a nomination from the APS Forum on Physics and Society, "for outstanding contributions to the nation through informing, crafting, and advancing innovative, inclusive, and data-driven science and technology policy".
