= Sonali Chakravarti Banerjee =

Indian academic, vice-chancellor of the University of Calcutta

Dr. Sonali Chakravarti Banerjee

Vice Chancellor of Rabindra Bharati University
- In office 2 August 2025 – 5 June 2026
- Preceded by: Subhro Kamal Mukherjee (acting)
- Succeeded by: TBD

Vice Chancellor of West Bengal State University
- In office 26 December 2024 – 1 August 2025
- Preceded by: Dr. Souren Bandhopadhyay
- Succeeded by: Debabrata Mitra

Vice Chancellor of University of Calcutta
- In office 15 July 2017 – 15 July 2022
- Preceded by: Ashutosh Ghosh
- Succeeded by: Asis Kumar Chattopadhyay

Personal details
- Spouse: Alapan Bandyopadhyay
- Occupation: Academician

Dr. Sonali Chakravarti Banerjee is an Indian academic who has served as the Vice Chancellor of Rabindra Bharati University. She also served as the Vice Chancellor of University of Calcutta and West Bengal State University.

== Career ==
Banerjee completed her Bachelor's studies from Presidency College, Kolkata (as a graduating student of the University of Calcutta), and subsequently, earned her postgraduate and doctoral degrees from the University of Calcutta. In August 2017 she was appointed as the vice-chancellor of the University of Calcutta, after the then vice-chancellor Suranjan Das was transferred to Jadavpur University. She is the first lady Vice Chancellor of the University of Calcutta. She was appointed as the Vice-chancellor of Rabindra Bharati University in August 2025, until her resignation in June 2026.

== Personal life ==
She is a daughter of Bengali poet Nirendranath Chakravarty and freedom fighter Sushama Chakravarti. She is married to Alapan Bandyopadhyay, who was the former Chief Secretary to the Government of West Bengal and now serving as the Chief Advisor to the Chief Minister of West Bengal.
