= West Bengal State University =

Public state university in West Bengal, India

- Motto: lakṣya viśvamānavam
- Motto in English: The goal is universal
- Type: Public State University
- Established: 25 February 2008 (18 years ago)
- Accreditation: NAAC
- Academic affiliations: UGC; AIU
- Budget: ₹30.57 crore (US$3.2 million) (2024–25)
- Chancellor: Governor of West Bengal
- Vice-Chancellor: Debabrata Mitra
- Academic staff: 98 (2025)
- Students: 2,492 (2025)
- Postgraduates: 2,029 (2025)
- Doctoral students: 463 (2025)
- Location: Barasat, West Bengal, India; 22°44′21″N 88°26′06″E
- Campus: Urban 27.86 acres (11.27 ha)
- Website: wbsu.ac.in/web/

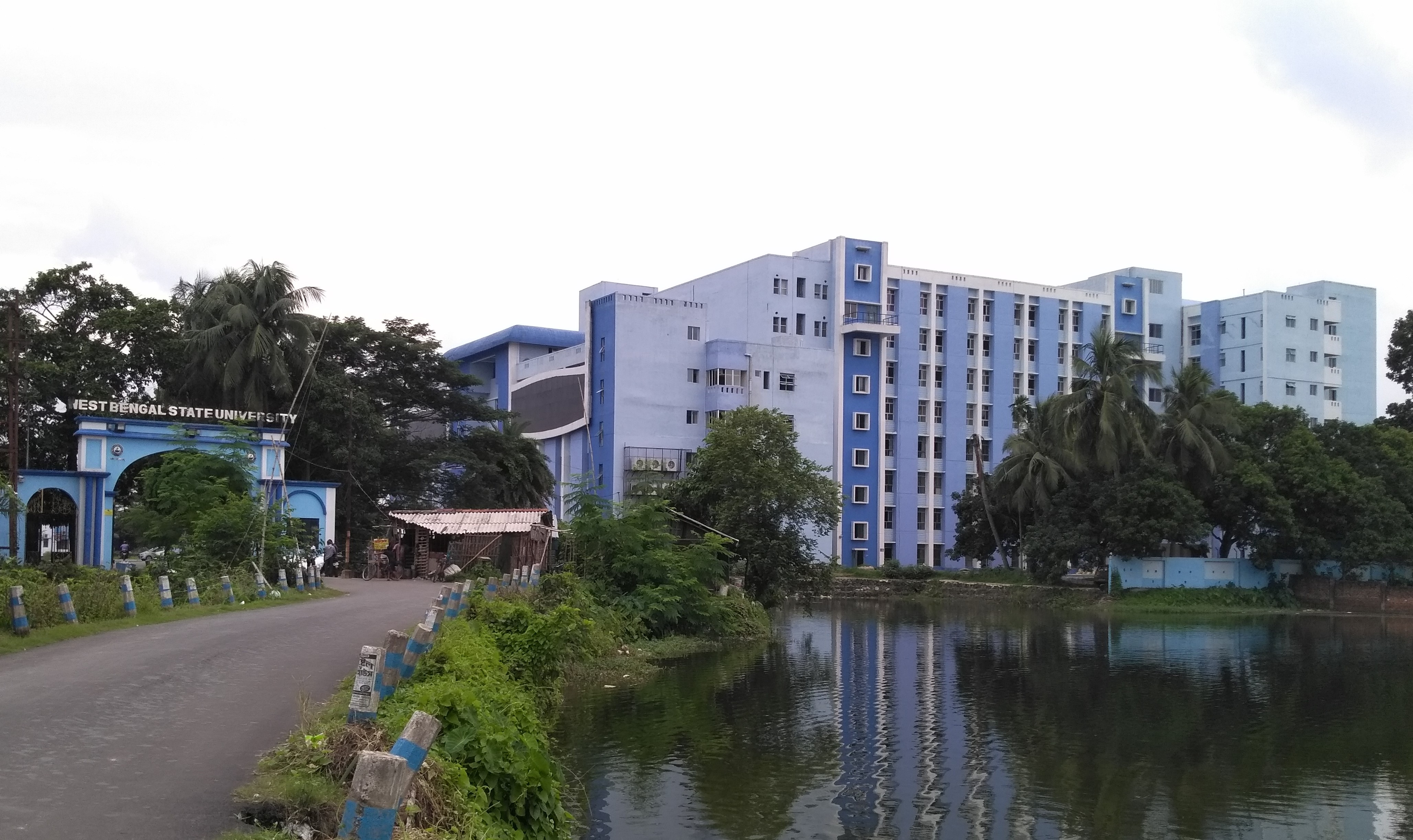
WBSU main gate and administrative building

West Bengal State University (WBSU) is a public university situated in Berunanpukuria, North 24 Paraganas, West Bengal, India. It was established by an Act of the Legislative Assembly in 2007.

== History ==
The Government of West Bengal through an Act of the Legislative Assembly has passed West Bengal Act XXVIII, 2007 implementing a long-standing public demand in creating the university named West Bengal State University at Barasat, North 24 Paraganas. This became functional from the academic session 2008–09. On 26 May 2008, there were 63 colleges formerly affiliated with the University of Calcutta. They were, through a government notification (No.300-Edn (U)/ IU-38/08), transferred to this new university. The university began functioning under its first Vice-Chancellor Ashoke Ranjan Thakur, the erstwhile Pro-Vice-Chancellor of Jadavpur University.

== Campus and location ==
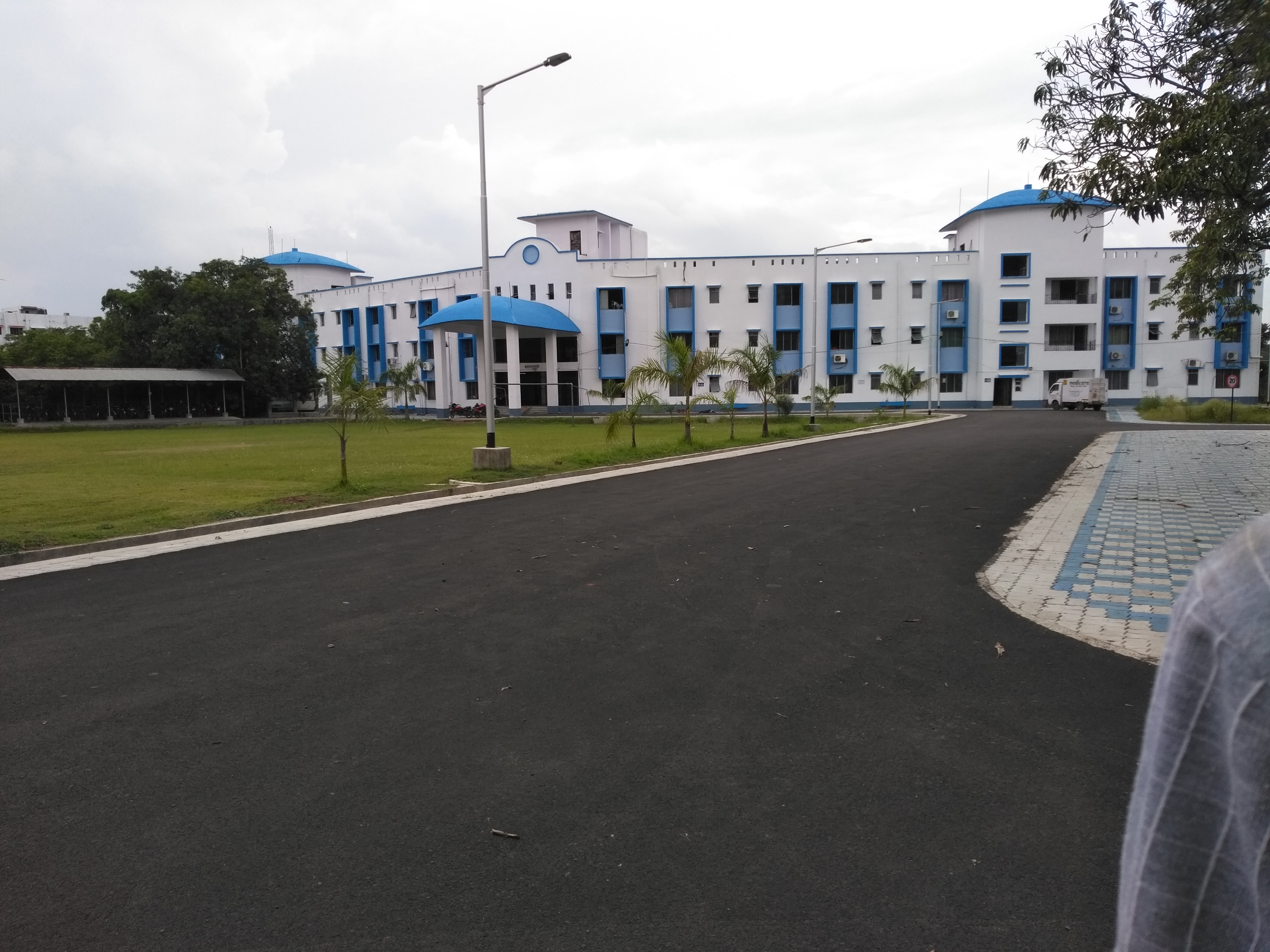
WBSU old building and campus

The total area of university campuses is 29 acres (0.12 km^{2}). The university is located in very quiet place, free of crowd, at a remote village named Berunanpukuria, which is located in the North 24 Parganas district, 7 km off Barasat city (the district headquarters of North 24 Parganas), North 24 Paraganas, West Bengal, India.

== Organization and administration ==
=== Governance ===
The Governor of West Bengal is the ex-officio Chancellor of the university, while the Vice-chancellor of the university is the chief executive officer of the university. The Vice-Chancellor shall hold the office for a period of four years or till the age of sixty-five, whichever is earlier. Currently, Prof. Debabrata Mitra is the Vice-Chancellor of the university.

List of All Vice-Chancellors
No.	Name	Period
1.	Ashok Ranjan Thakur	May 2008 - May 2012
2.	Kaushik Gupta	May 2012 - May 2014
3.	Chanchal Kumar Bose	May 2014 - December 2014
4	Jyotish Prakash Bose	December 2014 - September 2015
5	Basab Chaudhuri	September 2015 - February 2021
6	Mahua Das	February 2021 - May 2023
7	Raj Kumar Kothari	September 2023 - June 2024
8	Dr. Souren Bandhopadhyay	June 2024 - December 2024
9	Sonali Chakravarti Banerjee	December 2024 - August 2025
10	Debabrata Mitra	January 2026 - present

=== Faculties and departments ===
West Bengal State University has 30 departments organized into three faculty councils.

- Faculty of Science

This faculty consists of the departments of Anthropology, Mathematics, Physics, Chemistry, Computer Science, Biochemistry, Psychology, Geography, Rural Studies, Electronics, Food and Nutrition, Microbiology, Statistics, Economics, Botany, Zoology, and Physiology.

- Faculty of Arts

This faculty council consists of the departments of Bengali, English, Hindi, Sanskrit, Urdu, Arabic, History, Political Science, Philosophy, Education, Sociology, Library Science, Film Studies, and Journalism.

- Faculty of Commerce and Management

This faculty consists of the departments of Commerce and Business Administration.

=== Affiliations ===
The university is an affiliating institution. All the 55 colleges (including Undergraduate, Postgraduate, and B.Ed.) in the district of North 24 Parganas, which were formerly affiliated with the University of Calcutta, are affiliated to this university. As of June 2025 the university has 55 affiliated colleges, of which 8 are Fully Govt. funded, 7 are S.F (Self-Financing) and rests are Govt. Aided (G.A) colleges. Out of 55 colleges, eight are NAAC-accredited A-grade colleges and 19 colleges offer Postgraduate courses.

== Academics ==
=== Admission ===
One can take admission in the undergraduate course of the university based on their results in the higher secondary (10+2) examination. For admission in the postgraduate courses and doctoral degree courses, one has to take an entrance exam (written test/interview) given by the university or any national level exam related to the subject, held by the University Grants Commission.

=== Library ===
The university has a library on the first floor of its main building with an internet facility. This library is usually called as "Central library of WBSU". The recent Librarian is Dr. Sushanta Banerjee. The central library maintains various subjects like,

- Number of books - 159000 (approx)
- Number of journals - 50 (approx)
- Number of reference books - 1500 (approx)

=== Accreditation ===
The university is recognized by the University Grants Commission (U.G.C.) in terms of Section 12B of the U.G.C. Act. The university received accreditation from National Assessment and Accreditation Council (NAAC) on 23 February 2021.

== Gallery ==
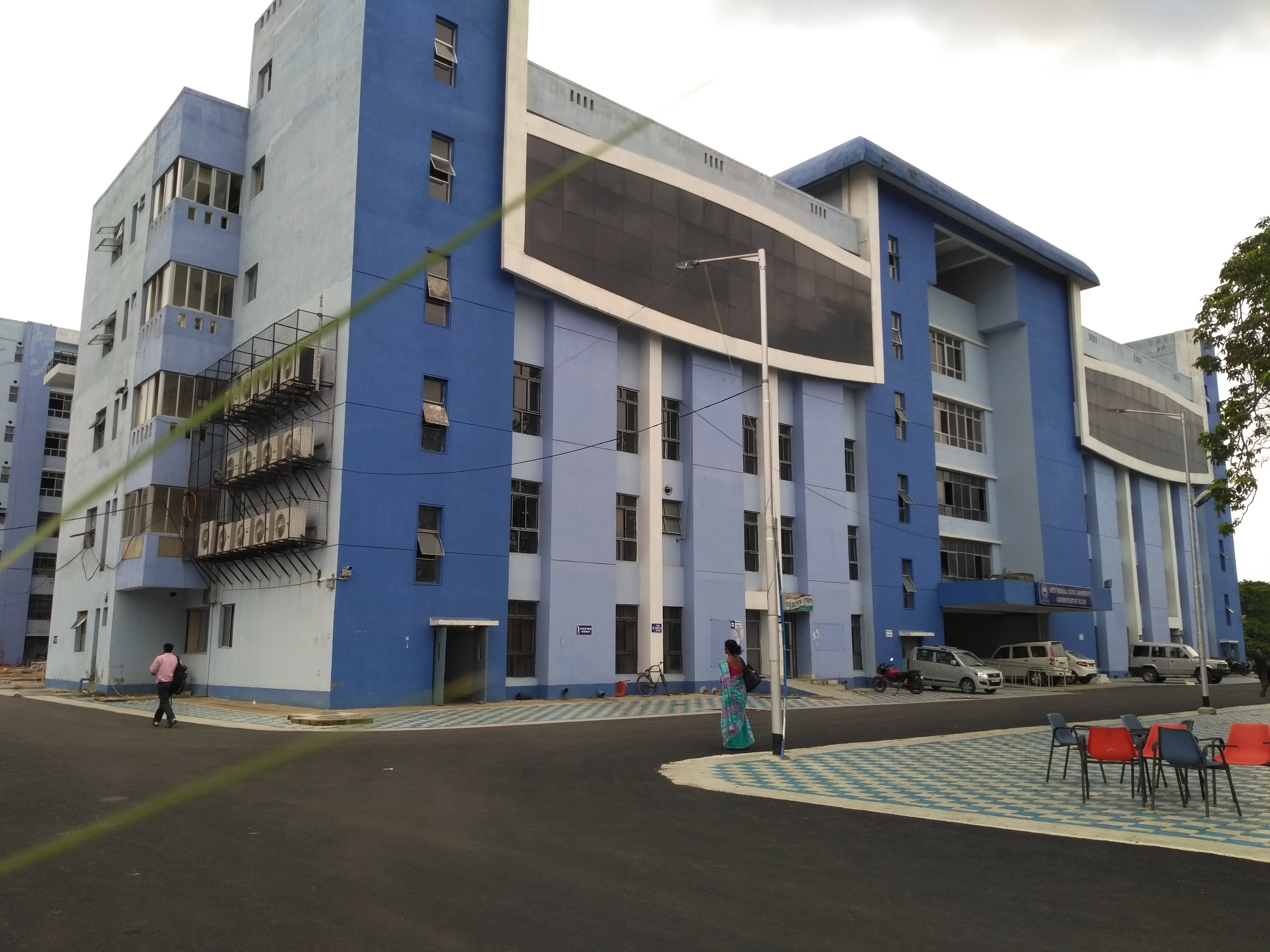
WBSU Administrative building side view

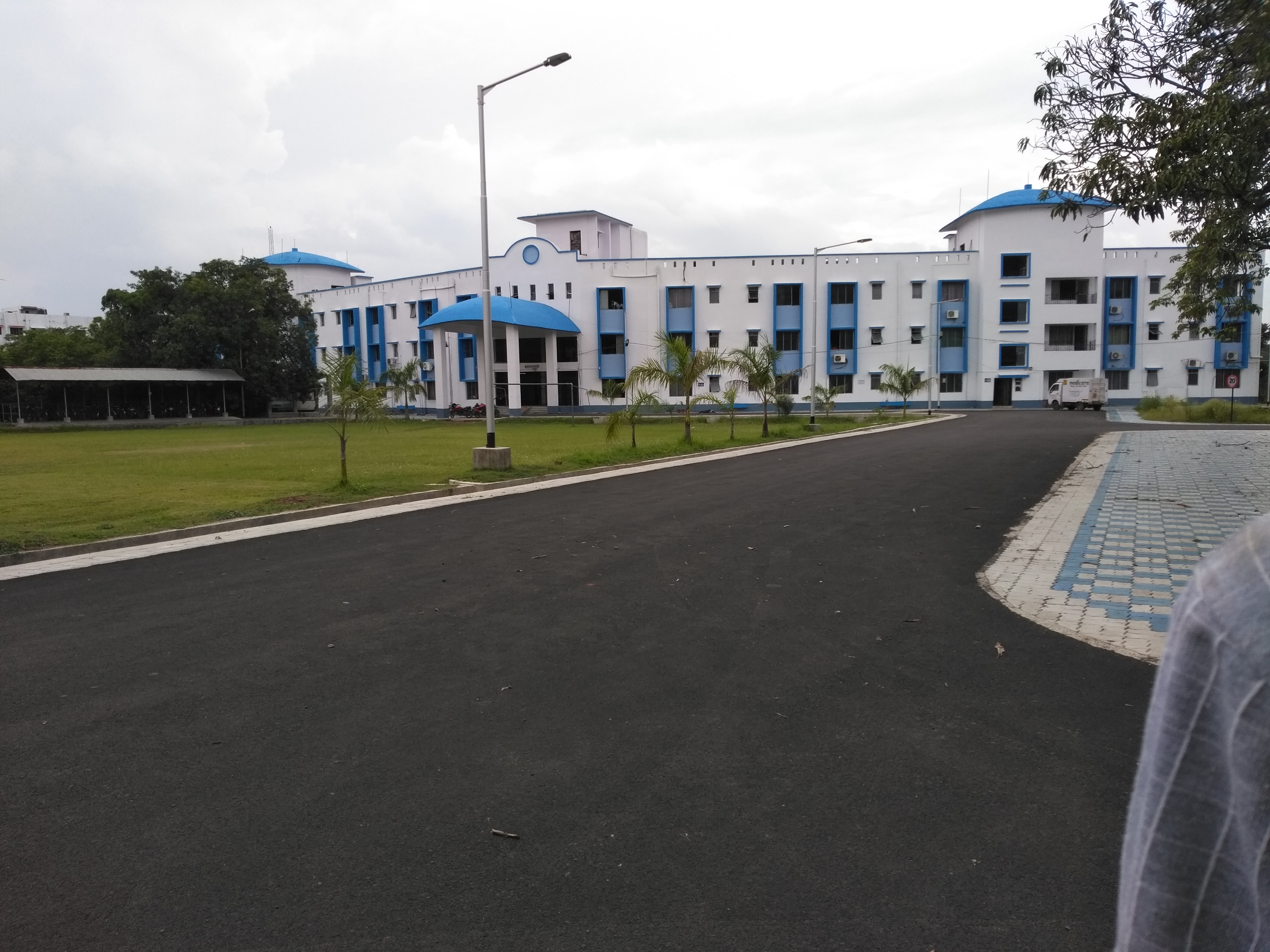
WBSU first building

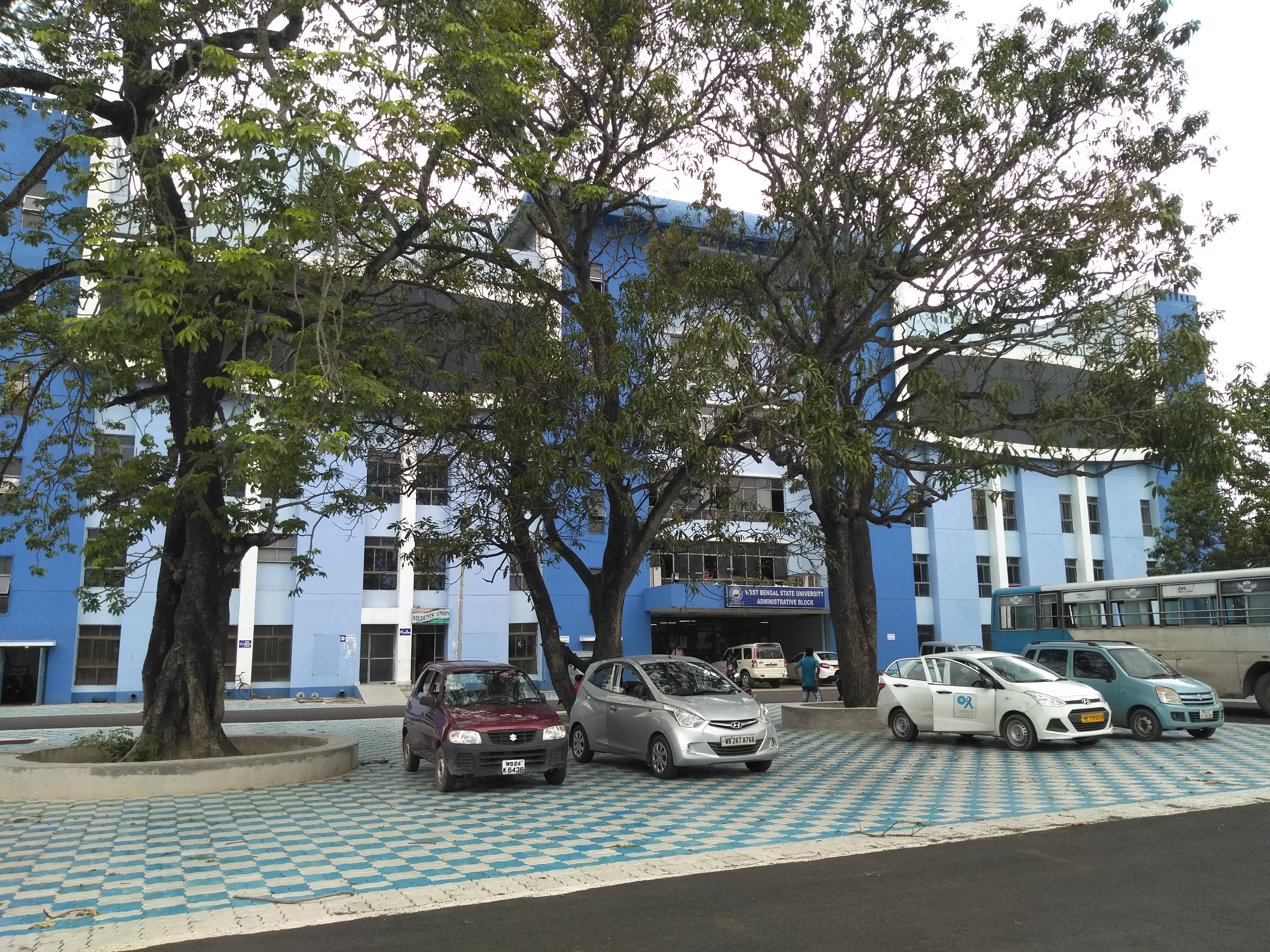
Administrative building front view

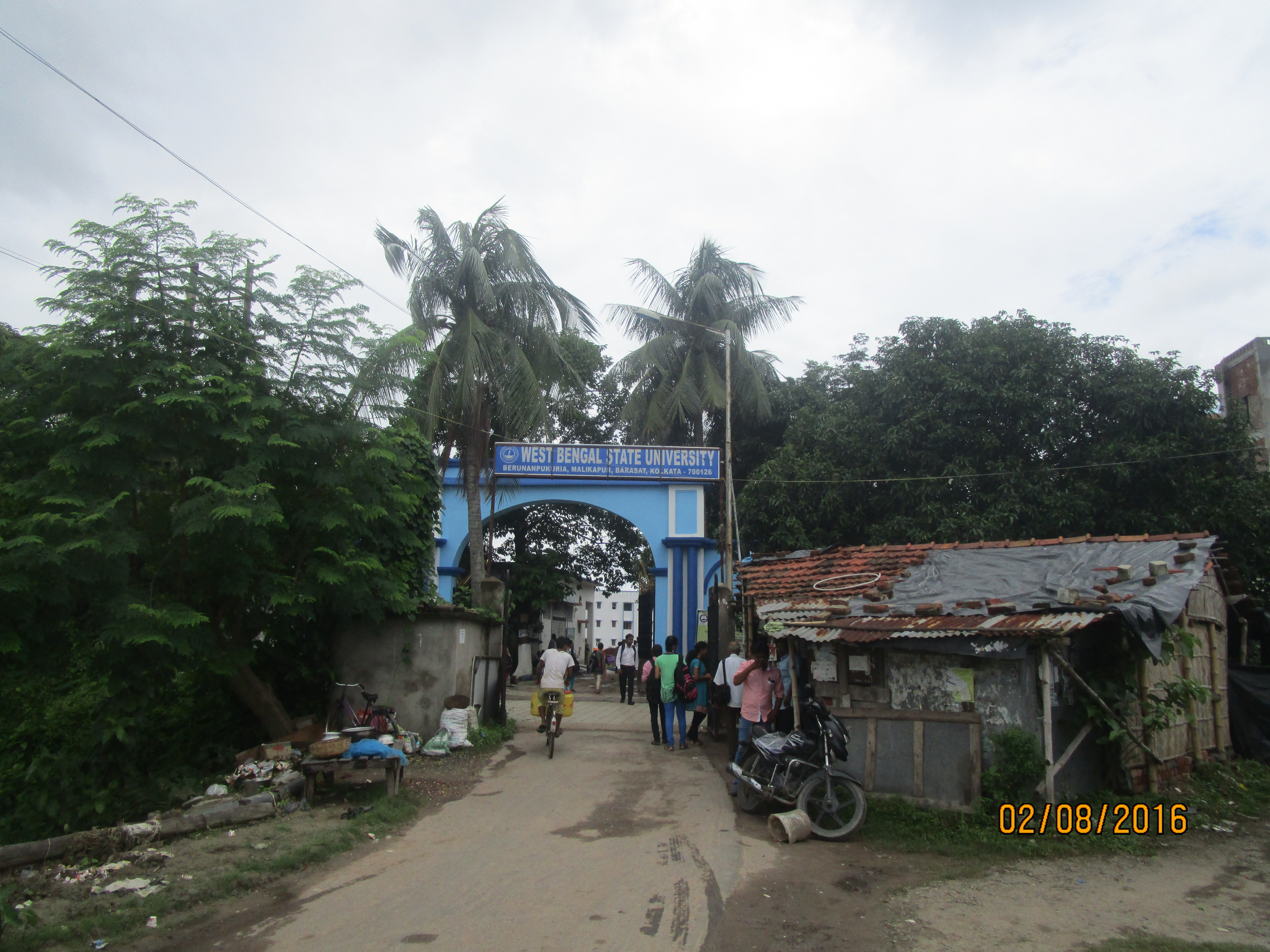
Entrance of West Bengal State University (captured in 2016)

== Notable alumni ==
- Raj Chakraborty — filmmaker
- Partha Bhowmick — theater artist
- Rubel Das — actor
- Shweta Bhattacharya — actress
- Sayantan Ghosal — Indian screenplay writer and filmmaker

== Notable Faculty ==
- Sonali Chakravarti Banerjee

== See also ==
- List of universities in West Bengal
