= Gauri Rani Banerjee =

Indian social worker

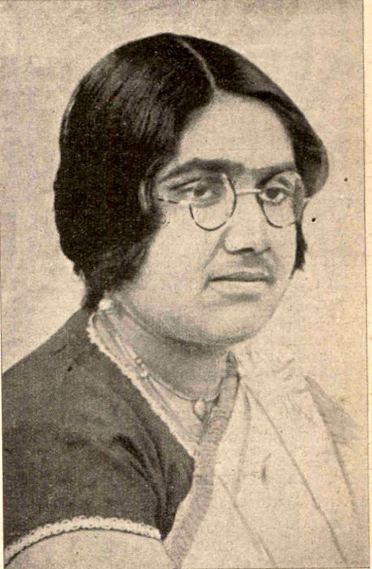
- Occupation: Social worker
- Employer: Dhorabji Tata School of Social Work

Gauri Rani Banerjee was an Indian social worker who instituted the first department of medical and psychiatric social work in India in 1948.

== Biography ==
After training in the United States, Banerjee returned to her home country of India. In 1948, she instituted the first department of medical and psychiatric social work in India at the Dhorabji Tata School of Social Work (now TISS) in Byculla.

Banerjee is credited with linking social work concepts to traditional Indian literature, culture and religious texts, such as the concept of mutual obligation to society. She also dealt with issues including "child marriage, caste discrimination, and rights for women."
