= Audrish Banerjee =

Indian cricketer (born 1975)

Audrish Banerjee (born 26 February 1975) is an Indian former cricketer. He was a right-handed batsman and right-arm offbreak bowler who played for Bengal. He was born in Belurmath.

Banerjee represented Bengal Under-19s during the Cooch Behar Trophy competitions of 1991-92 and 1992–93. During the 1992–93 season, he represented India Under-19s in three matches during the Coca-Cola International Youth Challenge.

Banerjee made an Under-19 Test appearance during the 1992–93 season, against England, capturing the wickets of Michael Vaughan and Jason Kerr.

Banerjee made a single first-class appearance for Bengal against Punjab later that season, bowling 16 overs and scoring 4 runs.
