= Phil Charles =

British engineer

- Born: Philip Charles
- Citizenship: British
- Occupation: Engineer
- Employer: DS Penske
- Title: Deputy Team Principal

Philip Charles is a British Formula One and motorsport engineer and executive. He is currently the Deputy Team Principal for DS Penske Formula E team.

== Career ==
Charles studied Automotive Engineering at the University of Loughborough, graduating in 2003. He began his motorsport career with the Renault F1 Team as a Research and Development Engineer, before progressing into vehicle performance roles and later working as a trackside engineer with the test team. In 2007, he became Performance Engineer to Giancarlo Fisichella, before being promoted to Race Engineer for Nelson Piquet Jr. in 2008 and the first half of the 2009 season. This period included the 2008 Singapore Grand Prix, although Charles was not involved in the Crashgate controversy. He subsequently served as Race Engineer to Romain Grosjean during the latter half of the 2009 season.

Charles departed Renault at the end of 2009, and spent the next three years running a Go-Karting company. He returned to Formula One in 2013 with Scuderia Toro Rosso, initially as a Race Engineer to Jean Eric Vergne before being promoted to Chief Race Engineer at the start of 2014. He held the role until the end of the 2016 season, overseeing race engineering operations for the Faenza-based team.

After leaving Toro Rosso in 2017, Charles became technical director of the Jaguar Racing Formula E team, where he was responsible for the technical management of the team, including the overall powertrain design and development. He departed the team at the end of 2023, and joined DS Penske as Deputy Team Principal, working closely with Jay Penske and reuniting Charles with Jean Eric Vergne.
