= Syagnik Banerjee =

American-Indian writer, scholar and professor

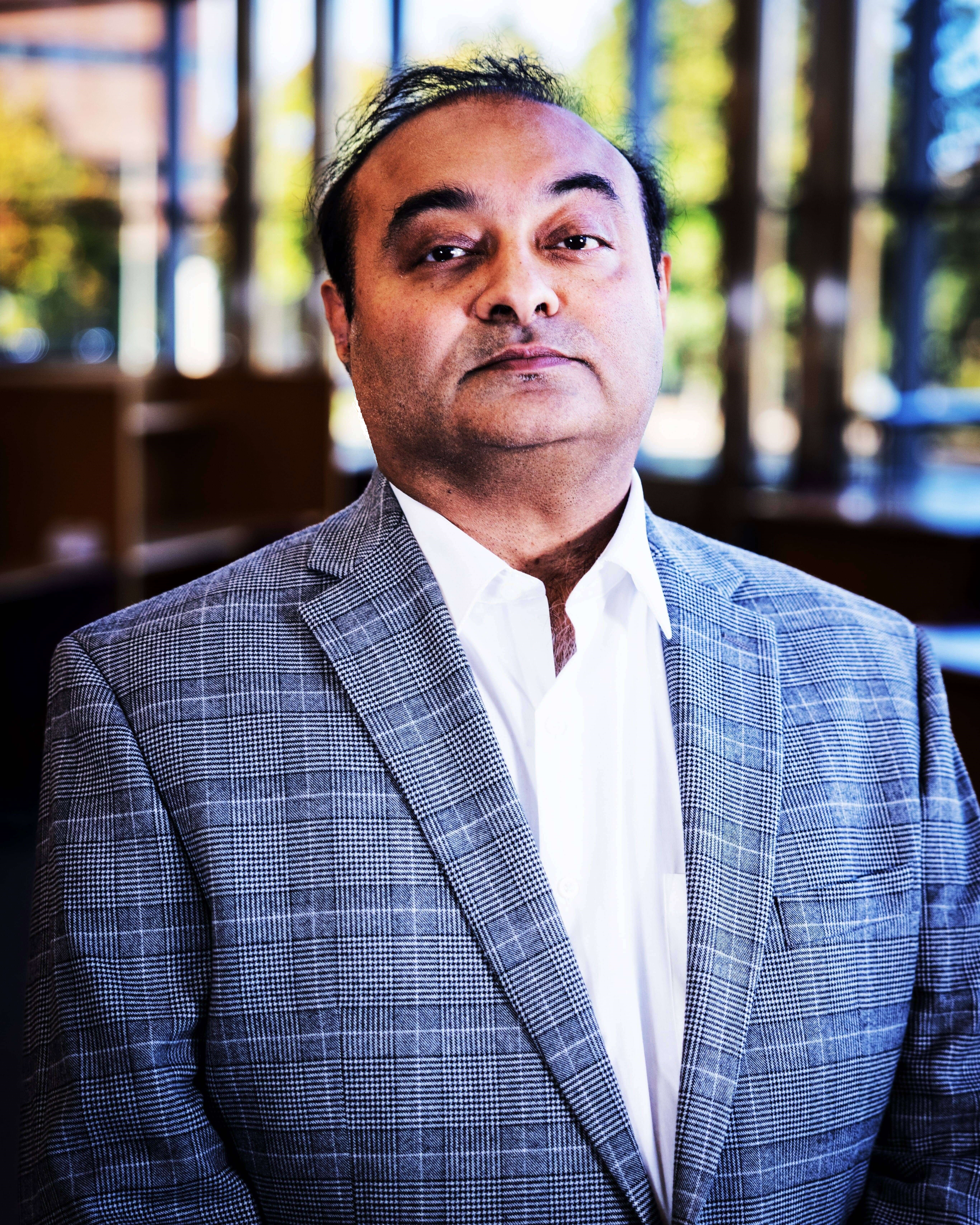
- Occupations: Scholar, author, professor

Academic background
- Education: Presidency University, Kolkata (BSc) International Management Institute- New Delhi(MBA) University of Rhode Island (PhD)

Academic work
- Main interests: Marketing, data science, public policy

Syagnik “Sy” Banerjee is an American (of Indian origin) scholar, author, and professor affiliated with the University of Michigan-Flint. He is known for publishing literature on the subjects of digital marketing, data sciences, and public policy. He co-authored the book M-Powering Marketing in a Mobile World.

== Education ==
Banerjee graduated from Presidency University, Kolkata with a bachelor's degree in economics in 1997. He earned an MBA in marketing from International Management Institute in 1999 and a PhD in marketing from the University of Rhode Island.

== Career ==
Before pursuing a career in academia, Banerjee worked in several jobs for companies such as Eveready Industries, Venture Infotech Group, and Bharti Telecom Group.

In 2006, Banerjee was named a fellow of the AMA-Seth Doctoral Consortium. Banerjee joined the faculty of the University of Michigan-Flint in 2008 as an assistant professor. Banerjee also taught a course at Northwestern University, developing and teaching the first academic course on mobile marketing at Northwestern.

He also became an associate professor at the University of Michigan-Flint in 2014 and a professor of marketing in 2020. As of 2022, he is an affiliate professor at the University of Michigan's Michigan Institute for Data Science (MIDAS).

Banerjee also participated in the OakGov Challenge in 2010, winning third place for his web application OMG Campus.

Banerjee is also an associate editor for the Journal of Consumer Marketing and a member of the editorial board for the European Journal of Marketing and the Journal of Research in Interactive Marketing.

Banerjee co-authored the 2017 book M-Powering Marketing in a Mobile World with Ruby Roy Dholakia and Nikhilesh Dholakia. Banerjee also contributed a chapter titled “India: The Awakening of M-Commerce” to the book M-Commerce: Global Experiences and Perspectives.

== Publications ==
- Banerjee, S., Dholakia, R. R., Dholakia, N. (2017). M-Powering Marketing in a Mobile World. United States: Business Expert Press. ISBN 9781631570049
