= Bratati Bandyopadhyay =

Bengali elocutionist

Bratati Bandopadhay
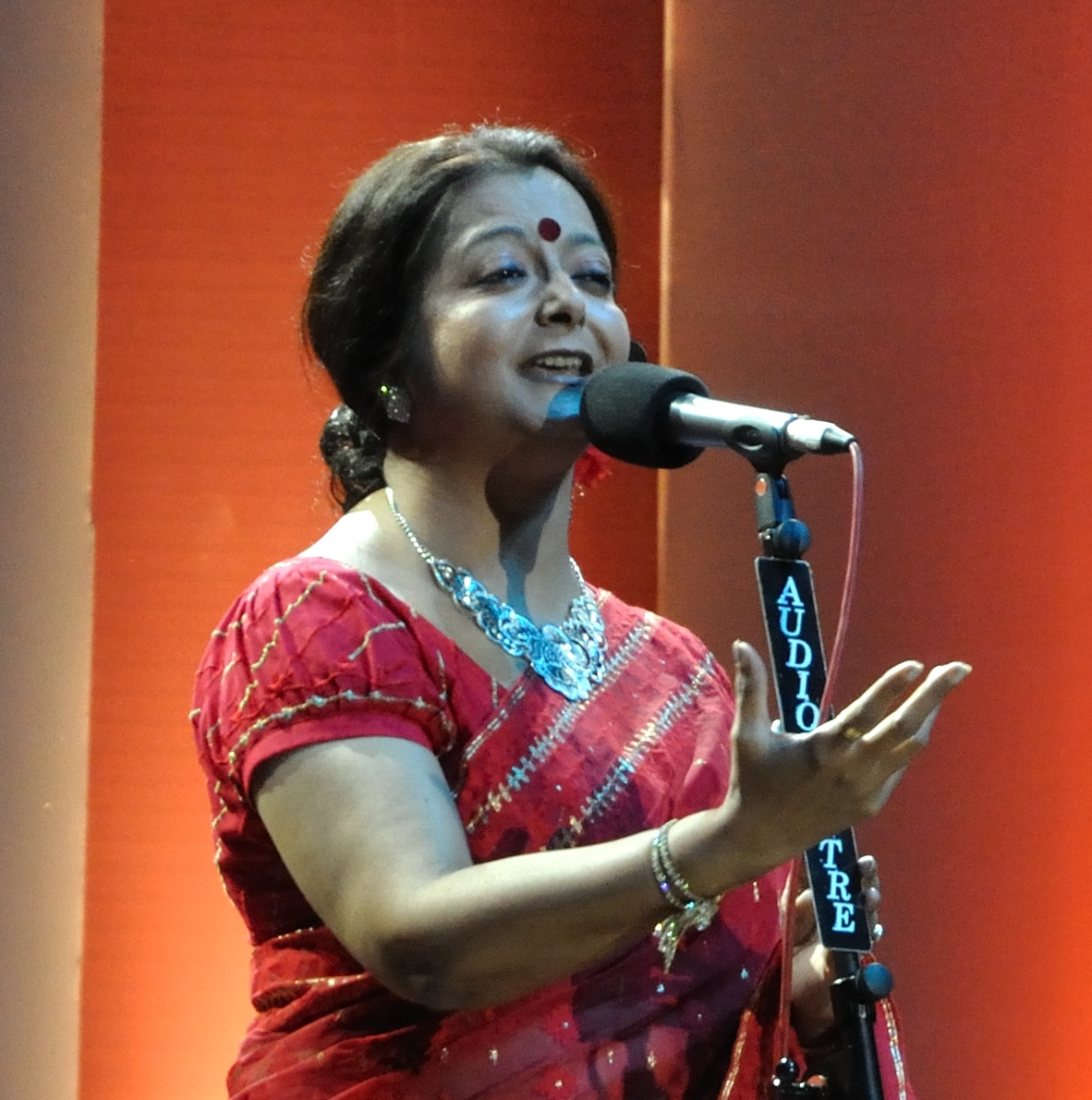
- In Kolkata, 2011
- Other name: Bratati Banerjee
- Occupation: Bengali elocutionist

Bratati Bandopadhay or Bratati Banerjee is a Bengali language elocutionist. She is the founder head of Kabyayan, an institution for practising elocution and Bratati Parampara, an organization that works on elocution and other forms of performing arts. She recites works of old and contemporary Bengali poets like Rabindranath Tagore, Nazrul Islam, Sukumar Ray and Shankha Ghosh to name a few.

== Early life ==
She was born to Manjul Kumar Bandyopadhyay and Maya Bandyopadhya in Kolkata. Her education started at Bethune Collegiate School at Kolkata. During her college days, she moved to Barasat, Hridaypur, of Kolkata along with her parents and her younger brother. She secured first class in Masters examination in economics from the University of Calcutta.

== Works ==
Bratati gave more than 2000 poetry recitals in India and abroad. She has been invited by several countries all over the world including the US, UK, Australia, Kuwait, Muscat Singapore and Bangladesh. In December 1996, she gave her first three-hour-long solo recital titled Ek Sandhyay Eka Bratati which created a milestone in the cultural history of Bengal. Emotions and ecstasies charged the full-house audience as she put forth every brilliant poem with all its exquisite beauty and appeal. Till date Kolkata witnessed 7 solo recitals given by her, each of three-hour-duration, with full-house. Some of her highly appreciated recitals include Ek Sandhyay Eka Bratati (Part 2 and 3) Pachishey Bratati, Chirasakha and Chiradiner. Bratati set up Kabyayan, an institution for practicing recitation, which now caters almost 800 students. Recently it has completed 25 years of its journey. She is the founder head of Bratati Parampara that promotes recitation and allied forms of performing art in a more professional manner. She is a mentor for elocution in the schools run by the Techno India Group where she along with her students gives lessons to school children. She conducted a special workshop for inmates of Presidency Correctional Home in 2006.

Albums

Bratati has more than 60 albums to her credit till date. Some of her published titles are given below.

Based on Rabindranath Tagore's works:

- Rabindranath O Rabindranath (Asha Audio)
- Chirosakha (Asha Audio)
- Tomar Andhar Tomar Alo (Saregama)
- Chhotoder Rabindranath (Saregama)
- Amar Rabindranath (Saregama)
- Ebang raktakarabi (Saregama)
- Ebang Strir Patra (Saregama)
- Jharer Kheya (Atlantis Music)
- Monere Tai Kaho Je (Sound Wing)
- Satobarsho Pare (Sound Wing)
- Dujone dekha holo (with Srabani Sen) (Picasso Entertainment)
- Gitanjali (with Pratush Bandyopadhyay) (Saregama)
- Mohordi (with Rezwana Chowdhury Banya) (ATMA Cassettes)

Modern poems

- Jiban Gaan (Asha Audio)
- Chiradiner (Saregama)
- Sunil Sagare (Saregama)
- Bhalo Theko (Saregama)
- Romance (Saregama)
- Sudhu Kabitar Janya (Saregama)
- Kathamanabi (Saregama)
- Phire eso Agun (Saregama)
- Ami-i Sei Meye (Saregama)
- Jayjayanti (With Srikanta Acharya and Joy Goswami) (Orion)

For Children

- Phul Pakhi Tarader Sange (Bhavna)
- Dao Phire Se Chhelebela (His Master's Voice)
- Hip Hip Hurray (Bhavna)

=== Filmography ===
- Rangeen Godhooli (2009, as an actor)
