= Shakuntala Banerjee =

German television journalist and reporter

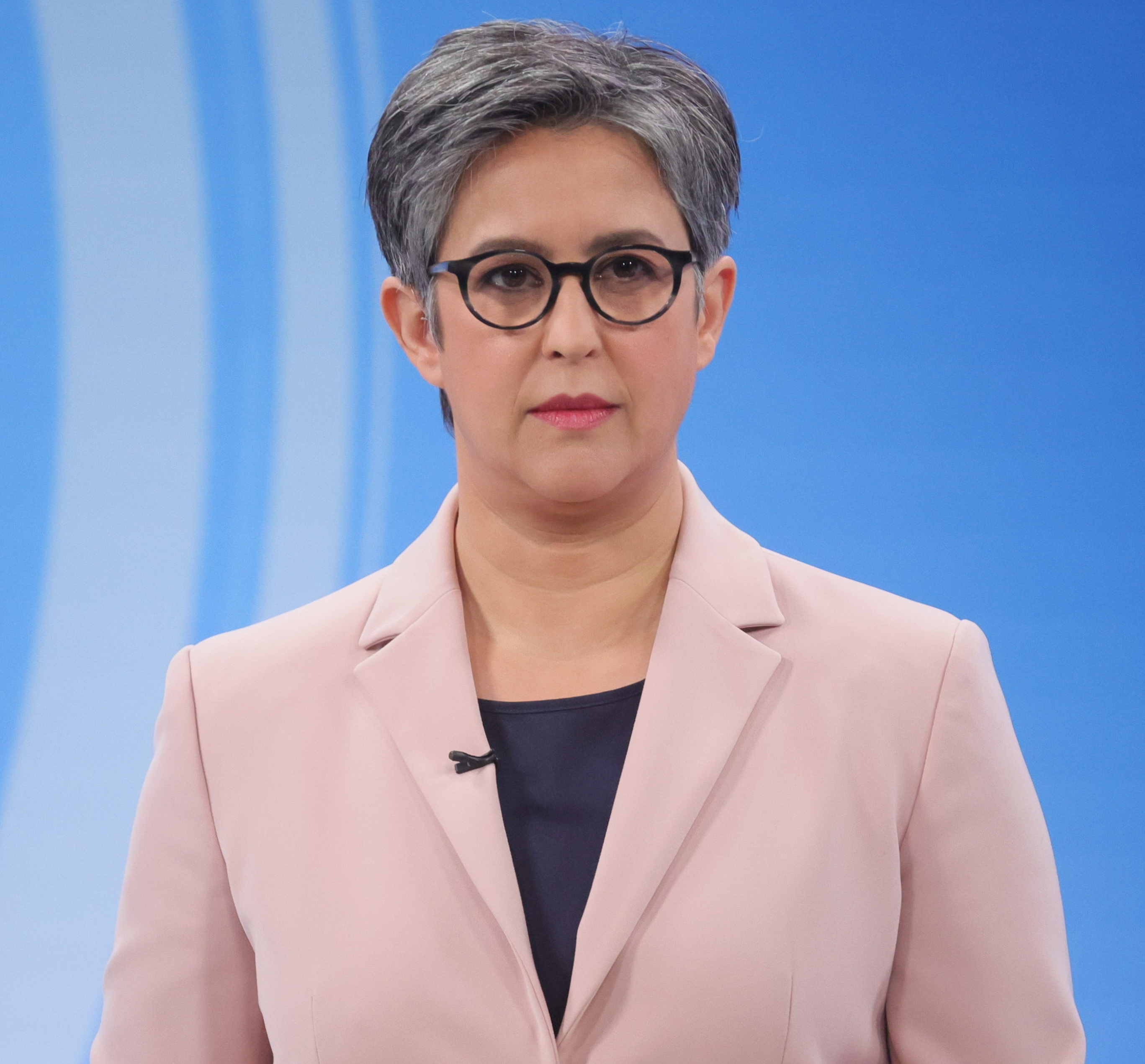
- Shakuntala Banerjee in 2025
- Born: 1973 (age 52–53); Rheydt, Mönchengladbach, North Rhine-Westphalia, West Germany
- Education: Abitur (Bischöfliche Marienschule Mönchengladbach)
- Occupations: Television journalist; Reporter
- Employer: Zweites Deutsches Fernsehen
- Awards: See Awards

Shakuntala Banerjee (born 1973) is a German television journalist and reporter.

== Life ==
Banerjee was born in 1973 in Rheydt, Mönchengladbach, North Rhine-Westphalia, West Germany to a German mother and an Indian Bengali father. She grew up in Rheydt and graduated from the Bischöfliche Marienschule Mönchengladbach.

Banerjee studied philosophy, German, and Indology in Bonn, later political science and public law. During her studies she gained her first journalistic experience as a student assistant in the capital studios of Westdeutscher Rundfunk (WDR) and RTL.

After completing her studies, Banerjee helped set up the Volk Verlag in Munich and supervised the publication of the lexicon of economic works at the University of Erfurt at the chair of Dietmar Herz. In 2003 Banerjee started working as a freelancer for Zweites Deutsches Fernsehen (ZDF), from 2005 she worked as a reporter for the Mainz ZDF editorial team for the magazine Drehscheibe Deutschland and reported for blickpunkt. From 2008 to 2011, Banerjee worked as a speaker for the ZDF editors-in-chief Nikolaus Brender and Peter Frey. From the end of 2011, Banerjee reported as a reporter from the ZDF Landesstudio Hessen, from 2015 she was a correspondent in Brussels. Since March 2019, she has been the deputy head of the capital studio based in Berlin and alternates with Theo Koll to present the program Berlin direkt.

== Awards ==
In 2015, Banerjee received the Heinrich Mörtl Foundation's media prize for the promotion of training and further education for police officers in the state of Hesse for the report Drogenmetropole Frankfurt – Der lange Weg gegen die Sucht (drug metropolis Frankfurt – The long way against the addiction).
