= Kali S. Banerjee =

Bangladeshi mathematician (1914–2002)

Kali S. Banerjee (September 17, 1914 – April 9, 2002) was a math and statistics expert, and a professor of statistics at the University of Delaware.

== Early life and education ==
He was born in Dhaka, (now in Bangladesh) in 1914. He earned his bachelor's degree in mathematics and his master's and doctoral degrees in statistics from the University of Calcutta.

== Career ==
In 1962, Kali S. Banerjee moved to the United States and he was naturalized in 1974, and joined as a faculty of statistics at University of Delaware. Before joining the University of Delaware, he taught at Cornell University and at Kansas State University Dr. Banerjee received the university's excellence in teaching award in 1972 and was named a fellow of Royal Statistical Society at London in 1975. He wrote many books such as The Cost Of Learning Index. He wrote about 15 study books on Statistics, about 13 books on Economics, in all writing about 40 books through his life.

== Personal life ==
He and his wife raised two children, a daughter, Swapna and a son, Deb.
