= Bishnupur gharana =

Indian style of singing

The Bishnupur gharana (alternatively spelt Vishnupur gharana) is a form of singing that follows the dhrupad tradition of Hindustani music, one of the two forms of Indian classical music.

== History ==
The gharana originated in Bishnupur, West Bengal, India in the late 18th century with its roots dating back to the 13th-14th centuries CE. The name of the town means "city of Vishnu" in Bengali. In the ancient past, this area, known as Mallabhum was the abode of Malla Kings who were vassals to the Mughal Empire and were devotees of Vishnu and patrons of music. Historians suggest that 'Mallabhum' had once been the cultural centre of Eastern India. It also has the distinction of being the only vocal gharana in West Bengal.

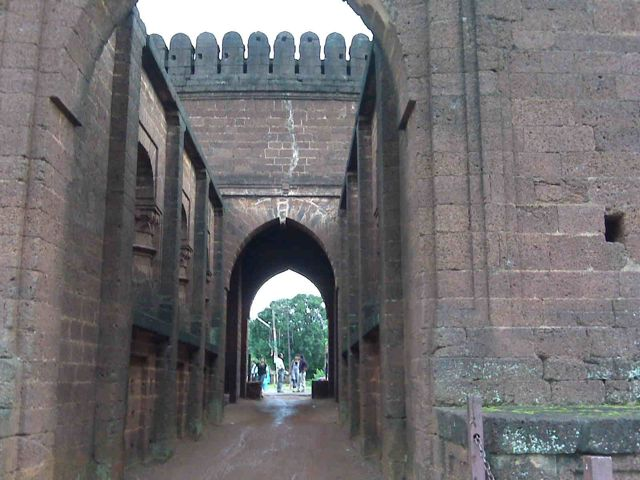
Entrance to the remains of the Palace of Bishnupur Kings

In the 17th century, during the reign of Mughal emperor Aurangazeb, many musicians moved to the court of the Maharaja of Bishnupur who was a known patron of the arts. The dhrupad singer Bahadur Khan of the Senia gharana, descendant of Tansen, fled to Bishnupur and made his gharana popular and sought refuge in the court. Bahadur Khan was not only a vocalist but could also play the Veena, the rabab, and the surshringar. The king, Raghunath Singh Deo II, accepted him as a court singer. In time, a good number of students became the disciples of Bahadur Khan.

Historical evidence points to Ramasharan Bhattacharya, a disciple of Bahadur Khan as the founder of the gharana. Bishnupur Gharana therefore has a strong link to Betiya Gharana through this unbroken relationship. However, this view is contradicted by some historians, who claim that Bahadur Khan could not have attended the Durbar of King Raghunath Singh Deo II because of anachronism, as there is a gap of at least 50 years (2 generations) between them. In practice, Bishnupur Gharana has got some characteristic features in the improvisations of some Ragas which are different from the practice of the Betiya school of the Seniya gharana.

== Style of singing and Ragas ==
In this style, the artist elaborates on the raga through the alap in a simple fashion, devoid of ornamentation. It is free from intricate play with the rhythm. Layakari is however allowed in Dhamar, another form of vocalisation. The khyal of the Bishnupur gharana is noted for its sweet, lilting melody. It is adorned with the usual ornaments, which add variety to the melodic presentation of the raga.

Its origins and development have led to a great openness in the teaching and evolution within this gharana.

This gharana has the ragas, many of them are now very popular by their names, but their notes and chalans are different. For example, this gharana's Purvi, Sohini, Shyam, Bibhas and many many more ragas with popular names have different notes and chalans. The Sohini, Purvi, Bibhas, Shyam, used by Rabindranath Tagore, are from this gharana. Because, his gurus-Jadu Bhatta, Bishnu Chakraborty belonged to this gharana.

== The Bishnupur gharana tree ==
Bahadur Khan
Gadadhar Chattopadhyaya
Ram Shankar Bhattacharya
Ramkeshab Bhattacharya	Keshablal Chakraborty	Kshetra Mohan Goswami	Anantalal Bandopadhyay	Jadunath Bhattacharya
Radhika Prasad Goswami	Ramprasanna Bandopadhyay	Gopeshwar Bandopadhyay	Surendranath Bandopadhyay Padma Shri (1972)	Ambika Charan Bandopadhyay	Bipin Chandra Chakraborty

== In popular culture ==
The dhrupad gharana of Bishnupur kingdom

=== Film ===
- Eastern Zonal Cultural Centre, Kolkata, brings you the Fourth Documentary from 𝗢𝗻𝗹𝗶𝗻𝗲 𝗔𝗿𝗰𝗵𝗶𝘃𝗲 𝗗𝗼𝗰𝘂𝗺𝗲𝗻𝘁𝗮𝗿𝘆 𝗙𝗶𝗹𝗺 𝗙𝗲𝘀𝘁𝗶𝘃𝗮𝗹. The video is a presentation on the dhrupad gharana of Bishnupur kingdom in West Bengal.
