= Anjan Bandyopadhyay =

Indian television journalist (1965–2021)

- Born: 24 August 1965; Asansol, West Bengal, India
- Died: 16 May 2021 (aged 55); Kolkata, West Bengal, India
- Occupation: Journalist
- Years active: 1988–2021

Anjan Bandyopadhyay or Anjan Banerjee (24 August 1965 – 16 May 2021) was an Indian Bengali journalist who worked for various news and media channels such as Anandabazar Patrika, ETV Bangla, Akash Bangla, Zee 24 Ghanta, TV9 Bangla. He was the younger brother of Alapan Bandyopadhyay, the Chief Secretary of West Bengal.

== Early life and education ==
Anjan Bandyopadhyay completed his bachelor's and master's degrees in Bengali literature from Presidency College, Kolkata. He passed the secondary exam from Ramakrishna Mission Vidyalaya, Narendrapur in 1981. He had a journalistic career spanning over 33 years. In the beginning of his career, he worked for news media and channels like Anandabazar Patrika, ETV Bangla, Akash Bangla & Zee 24 Ghanta etc. In 2015 he resigned from Zee 24 Ghanta and joined Anandabazar Patrika (Digital). He rejoined the Zee 24 Ghanta in November 2020. Before rejoining Zee 24 Ghanta, he was also associated with TV9 Bangla as its first editor.

== Death ==
Anjan Bandyopadhyay was admitted to the hospital due to COVID-19 in April 2021. He recovered and was discharged after a few days. In mid-May, his health deteriorated again, and he was hospitalized for the second time with fever. On 16 May 2021, he died in a private hospital in Kolkata. He's survived by his mother, wife, and daughter.
