= Bandopadhyay =

Bandyopadhyay or Banerjee (Bengali: বন্দ্যোপাধ্যায় (Bandyopadhyay)) is a native Bengali surname. The surname is used by the Bengali Kulin Brahmin community of India and Bangladesh.

== Notable people with the surname include ==
- Bappaditya Bandopadhyay (1970–2015), Indian director and poet
- Bhanu Bandopadhyay (1920–1983), Bengali film actor
- Bibhutibhushan Bandopadhyay (1894–1950), Bengali novelist and writer
- Haradhan Bandopadhyay (1926–2013), Indian Bengali male actor of television and films
- Manik Bandopadhyay (1908–1956), one of the founding fathers of modern Bengali fiction
- Padmavathy Bandopadhyay (born 1944), the first woman Air Marshal of the Indian Air Force
- Sailesh Kumar Bandopadhyay (born 1926), a Gandhian
- Sanjoy Bandopadhyay (born 1954), Bengali Hindustani classical sitar player
- Subhro Bandopadhyay (born 1978), Bengali poet
- Tarashankar Bandopadhyay (1898–1971), one of the leading Bengali novelists

== See also ==
- Banerjee, alternative of surname Bandopadhyay
