= Alapan Bandyopadhyay =

Indian civil servant (born 1961)

IAS Alapan Bandyopadhyay

1st Chief Advisor to Chief Minister of West Bengal
- In office 1 June 2021 – 6 May 2026
- Chief Minister: Mamata Banerjee

Chief Secretary of the Government of West Bengal
- In office 1 October 2020 – 31 May 2021
- Governor: Jagdeep Dhankhar
- Chief Minister: Mamata Banerjee
- Preceded by: Rajiv Sinha
- Succeeded by: Hari Krishna Dwivedi

Personal details
- Born: 17 May 1961 (age 65) Asansol, West Bengal, India
- Spouse: Sonali Chakravarti Banerjee
- Relations: Anjan Bandyopadhyay (brother)

Alapan Bandyopadhyay (born 17 May 1961) is an ex-Indian Administrative Service (IAS) officer and former Chief Secretary of State for the Government of West Bengal. He served as the Chief Advisor to the Chief Minister of West Bengal, Mamata Banerjee, from 1 June 2021 until his resignation in May 2026. He took over from IAS officer Rajiv Sinha, in the year 2020, starting his tenure as Chief Secretary of West Bengal.

== Career ==
Alapan was an IAS officer of batch-1987 from West Bengal. He was earlier a district magistrate of Howrah, North and South 24 Parganas districts. He had also served as Chief Executive Officer, Kolkata Metropolitan Development Authority and Kolkata Municipal Commissioner. He has also headed several departments — transport, Micro, Small and Medium Enterprises (MSME), commerce and industry, information and culture, and home — as principal secretary. The IAS officer also served as interim state election commissioner in 2015. He has penned several books including Amlar Mon in 2016 and edited several other books from Prosongo Gorkhaland (1987) to Philosopher's Stone: Speeches and Writings of Sir Daniel Hamilton (2000). He retired from IAS on 31 May 2021 and was appointed as Chief Advisor of Chief Minister of West Bengal from 1 June 2021 for 3 years. A student of Ramakrishna Mission Narendrapur (3rd rank holder in Secondary Examination, 1976, and a National Talent Search Scholar, 1978) and a student of Presidency College and Calcutta University (gold medalist in M.A. Political Science in 1983) he was a journalist with Anandabazar Patrika (ABP Group) before joining the IAS.

== Personal life ==
Bandyopadhyay was born in 1961 in Asansol, West Bengal. He is married to the former Vice Chancellor of the University of Calcutta and academic Sonali Chakravarti Banerjee. His son Milinda Banerjee is lecturer of Modern History in University of St. Andrews, Scotland. His younger brother, Anjan Bandyopadhyay who was a well-known journalist working in several Bengali media news channels, died on 16 May 2021 due to COVID-19 and its complications.
