= Raghab Bandyopadhyay =

Raghab Bandyopadhyay রাঘব বন্দ্যোপাধ্যায়
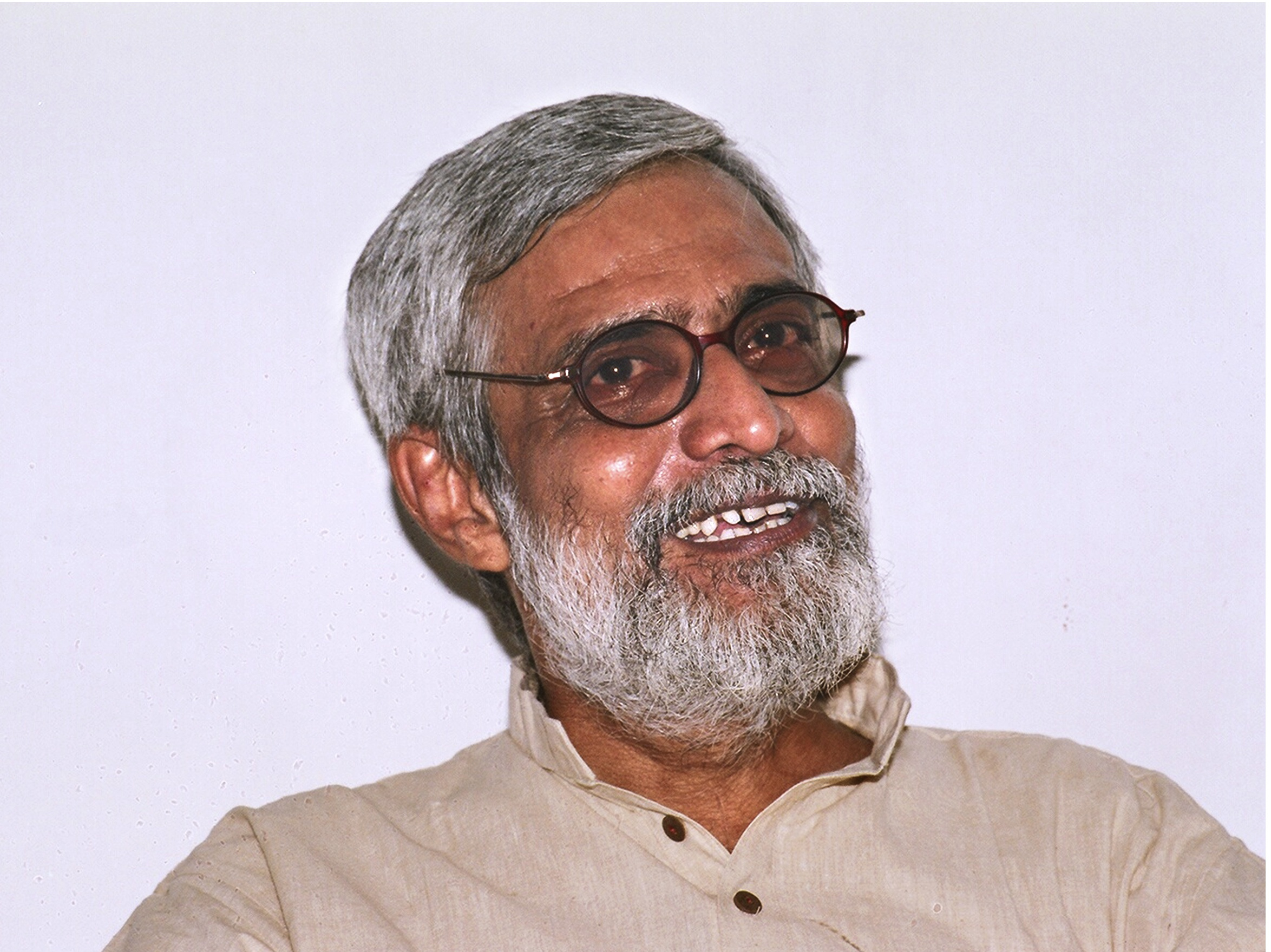
- Bandyopadhyay in 2012
- Born: 14 November 1948; Kolkata
- Died: 8 February 2017 (aged 68); India
- Occupations: author, columnist

Raghab Bandyopadhyay (Bengali: রাঘব বন্দ্যোপাধ্যায়) (14 November 1948 – 8 February 2017) was an Indian Bengali prose writer and columnist.

== Life ==
Raghab was born on 14 November 1948 at Bhawanipore in Kolkata, one year after India's Independence. Brought up in north Kolkata, he came in touch with rural Bengal in the late 60s by virtue of his close association with the Naxalite movement. About this time he started writing. In 1970, he was arrested and spent three years in jail. This experience was reflected in his first novel, Komunis (Bengali: কমুনিস). The publication of Komunis got an encouraging reaction from intellectuals including Ashok Rudra and Malini Bhattacharya. In the late 1970s and 1980s, Raghab Bandyopadhyay continued publishing. His works of the period include Baadar galpo (Bengali: বাদার গল্প), a collection of short stories, and his second novel Shaishab (Bengali: শৈশব). During this time Raghab also began his career as a professional journalist. Since his retirement in 2007 he has been heading a publishing house named Charchapada Publication Private Limited. He also edits a half-yearly Bengali magazine called Charcha (Bengali: চর্চা).

== Works ==
=== Collection of stories ===
1. Akaalbodhan O Anyanya Galpo (Bengali: অকালবোধন ও অন্যান্য গল্প)
2. Badar galpo (Bengali: বাদার গল্প)
3. Angshagrahan (Bengali: অংশগ্রহণ)
4. Galpo 33 (Bengali: গল্প ৩৩)
5. Ashmani Katha: Uchchheder 5 Kahon (Bengali: আশমানি কথা: উচ্ছেদের পাঁচ কহন)
6. Galpo Sangraha (Bengali: গল্প সংগ্রহ)
7. Daladas (Bengali: দলদাস)

=== Novels ===
1. Komunis (Bengali: কমুনিস)
2. Shoishab (Bengali: শৈশব)
3. Tahara (Bengali: তাহারা)
4. Mudran soundarya (Bengali: মুদ্রণ সৌন্দর্য)
5. Sahar sanskaran (Bengali: শহর সংস্করণ)
6. Satik jadunagar (Bengali: সটীক জাদুনগর)
7. Chor Challisha (Bengali: চোর চল্লিশা)
8. Medhabi Bhut O Madhabilata (Bengali: মেধাবী ভূত ও মাধবীলতা)
9. Operation Rajarhat (Bengali: অপারেশন রাজারহাট)
10. Kata jibher brittanta (Bengali: কাটা জিভের বৃত্তান্ত/ চন্দনা ডাইনি আর জাদুবাতি)
11. Raktajaba rahasya (Bengali: রক্তজবা রহস্য)

=== Contribution in edited volumes ===
1. Memory's Gold, Writings on Calcutta, edited by Amit Chaudhuri, Penguin Viking, 2008.
2. Calcutta The Living City, Vol:2, edited by Sukanta Chaudhuri, Oxford University Press, 1990.

=== Special issue on Raghab Bandyopadhyay ===
1. Kathak (Bengali: কথক), edited by Shatadal Mitra, January 2012. Some of the contributors are Dipesh Chakrabarty, Ashok Sen, Debesh Roy, Hiran Mitra, Swapan Chakrabarty, Pradip Basu, Sanjoy Mukhopadhyay, Sumita Chakrabarty, Ranabir Lahiri, Nabarun Bhattacharya, Debarshi Talukdar.

=== Essays ===
1. Kamalkumar Kolkata: Pichhutaaner itihas (Bengali: কমলকুমার ও কলকাতা: পিছুটানের ইতিহাস)
2. Marjiner Lekha Lekhar Marjine (Bengali: মার্জিনের লেখা লেখার মার্জিনে)

=== Journalistic and other writings ===
1. Banglar mukh (Bengali: বাংলার মুখ)
2. Babu Bibi o Tahara (Bengali: বাবু বিবি ও তাহারা)
3. Prantojaner Katha (Bengali: প্রান্তজনের কথা)
4. Journal 70 (Bengali: জার্নাল সত্তর)
