= Kalyan Banerjee (homoeopath) =

Indian homoeopath from New Delhi

- Born: New Delhi, India
- Occupation: Homoeopath
- Known for: Homoeopathy
- Children: Dr. Kushal Banerjee
- Awards: Padma Shri
- Website: www.drkbanerjee.com

Kalyan Banerjee is an Indian homoeopath from New Delhi. An alumnus of the Mihijam Institute of Homeopathy, he founded the Dr. Kalyan Banerjee Clinic, a homoeopathic healthcare centre based in Chittaranjan Park, New Delhi, in 1977.

He has been associated with several government agencies such as the Central Council for Research in Homoeopathy at the Ministry of Health and Family Welfare and was formerly a member of its Governing Council, and the Central Council for Research in Homoeopathy (CCRH) of the Ministry of AYUSH, with a seat in the Homeopathic Pharmacopoeia Committee and the Standing Finance Committee. In 2009, the Government of India awarded him the Padma Shri, the fourth highest civilian honour, for his work in the field of medicine.
