= Bandish =

Music genre

Bandish, cheez or gat is a fixed, melodic composition in Hindustani vocal or instrumental music. It is set in a specific raga, performed with rhythmic accompaniment by a tabla or pakhawaj, a steady drone, and melodic accompaniment by a sarangi, violin or harmonium. There are different ways of systematizing the parts of a composition. A bandish provides the literature element in the music, for standard structured singing. In the past many gharanas protected their bandishes from moving out of the family with gross incoherent vocal renditions. In the realm of vocal music, it is often known as cheez.

== Etymology ==
The word bandish is derived from the Hindustani language, and literally means "binding together".

== Sections ==
Sthāyī or Asthāyī: The initial, Rondo phrase or line of a fixed, melodic composition.

Antarā: The second body phrase or line of a fixed, melodic composition.

Sanchāri: The third body phrase or line of a fixed, melodic composition, seen more typically in Dhrupad bandishes.

Aabhog: The fourth and concluding body phrase or line of a fixed, melodic composition, seen more typically in Dhrupad bandishes.

== Tempo ==
There are three variations of Bandish, regarding tempo:

Vilambit Bandish: A slow and steady melodic composition, usually in Largo to Adagio speeds.

Madhyalaya Bandish: A medium tempo melodic composition, usually set in Andante to Allegretto speeds.

Drut Bandish: A fast tempo melodic composition, usually set to Allegretto speed, and onwards.

== Selected Bandish Compositions ==
Bandish	Language	Rāg	Lay	Tāl	Composer	Singer	Remarks	Publisher / Label	Ref.
Giridhar gopal shyam	Hindi	Bhimsen	Vilambit &Madhyalaya Bandish	Roopak	Mahesh Mahadev	Jayateerth Mevundi	Bandish on Lord Venkateshwara	PM Audios & Entertainments	
he mhare rajendra mana mohyo	Hindi	Dhanashree	Vilambit Bandish	Trital	Vilayat Hussain Khan	Vilayat Hussain Khan			
Aaj More Man Lago	Hindi	Gujri Todi	Madhyalaya Bandish	Teen		Bhimsen Joshi		Venus Worldwide Entertainment Pvt.Ltd.	
Begun Gun Gave	Hindi	Gujri Todi	Drut Bandish:	Teen		Bhimsen Joshi		Venus Worldwide Entertainment Pvt.Ltd.	
Ab to Badi Der Bhaila	Hindi	Bhimpalasi	Vilambit Bandish	Teen		Bhimsen Joshi		Venus Worldwide Entertainment Pvt.Ltd.	
Brij Mein Dhoom Machaye Kanha	Hindi	Bhimpalasi	Drut Bandish:	Teen		Bhimsen Joshi		Venus Worldwide Entertainment Pvt.Ltd.	
Dijyo Badhai Sab Mil Aaj	Hindi	Bhatiyar	Vilambit Bandish	Teen	Shankar Abhyankar	Sanjeev Abhyankar & Devaki Pandit		Fountain Music Company	
Man Ke Mandir Aayo Re	Hindi	Bhimsen	Drut Bandish	Teen	Mahesh Mahadev	Jayateerth Mevundi	Bandish on Lord Venkateshwara	PM Audios & Entertainments	
