= Alap =

Opening of Hindustani classical music

The Alap (/æˈlɑːp/; Hindustani: [aːˈlaːp]) is the opening section of a typical North Indian classical performance. It is a form of melodic improvisation that introduces and develops a raga. In dhrupad singing the alap is unmetered, improvised (within the raga) and unaccompanied (except for the tanpura drone), and started at a slow tempo. For people unfamiliar with the raga form, it introduces the thaat to the listener. It defines the raga, its mood, and the emphasized notes and notes with a secondary role.

Instead of wholly free improvisation, many musicians perform alap schematically, for example by way of vistar, where the notes of the raga are introduced one at a time, so that phrases never travel further than one note above or below what has been covered before. In such cases, the first reach into a new octave can be a powerful event.

In instrumental music, when a steady pulse is introduced into the alap, it is called jor; when the tempo has been greatly increased, or when the rhythmic element overtakes the melodic, it is called jhala (dhrupad: nomtom). The jor and jhala can be seen as separate sections of the performance, or as parts of the alap; in the same way, jhala can be seen as a part of jor.

== Classifications ==
Several musicologists have proposed much more complicated classifications and descriptions of alap. In the same way as traditional four-part compositions have a sthai, antara, sanchar and abhog, some treat alap with a four-part scheme using the same names. Bengali researcher Bimalakanto Raychoudhuri in his Bharatiya Sangeetkosh suggests classification both by length (aochar being the shortest, followed by bandhan, kayed and vistar) and by performance style (according to the four ancient vanis or singing styles – Gohar, Nauhar, Dagar and Khandar), and proceeds to list thirteen stages:

1. Vilambit
2. Madhya laya
3. Drut
4. Jhala
5. Thok
6. Lari/Ladi
7. Larguthav
8. Larlapet
9. Paran
10. Sath
11. Dhuya
12. Matha
13. Paramatha

Even though Raychoudhuri admits the 13th stage is wholly extinct, as we see we are in jhala already at the fourth stage; the sthai-to-abhog movement is all part of the first stage (vilambit). Stages six and up are for instrumentalists only. Other authorities have forwarded other classifications. For example, when alap is sung with lyrics or at least syllables, as in dhrupad, it is called sakshar as opposed to anakshar.

== See also ==
- Alapana
- Buka
