= Bhimsen (raga) =

Janya raga of Carnatic music

- Arohanam: S G₂ M₁ P N₃ Ṡ
- Avarohanam: Ṡ N₃ D₂ P M₁ G₂ R₁ S

Bhimsen is a rāgam in Carnatic music and Hindustani music(Indian classical music scale) created by music composer Mahesh Mahadev. named after ‘Bharat Ratna’ Pandit Bhimsen Joshi (BHIM) Miaya Tansen (SEN). It is the Janya raga of 11th Melakarta rāgam Kokilapriya in the 72 melakarta rāgam system of Carnatic music. Mahesh Mahadev introduced this raga to Indian classical music by composing two Hindustani Bandish.

== Structure and Lakshana ==
Descending is same as Kokilapriya scale with Shadjam at C

Bhimsen is an asampoorna rāgam (asymmetric scale) that does not contain rishabham and dhaivatam in the ascending scale. It is an audava-sampurna rāgam (owdava rāgam, means pentatonic in ascending scale). ārohaṇa-avarohaṇa of this raga as follows.

- ārohaṇa: S G₂ M₁ P N₃ Ṡ (Note: Alternate notations: Hindustani: S G̱ M P N Ṡ; Western: C E♭ F G B C)
- avarohaṇa: Ṡ N₃ D₂ P M₁ G₂ R₁ S (Note: Alternate notations: Hindustani: Ṡ N D P M G̱ Ṟ S; Western: C B A G F E♭ D♭ C)

The notes used in this raga are shadjam, sadharana gandharam, shuddha madhyamam, kakali nishadham in the arohanam and shuddha rishabham and chathusruthi dhaivatham added in the avarohanam of the raga. It is a audava - sampurna rāgam.

== Compositions ==
- 'Giridhar Gopal Shyam' Roopaktal, Vilambith and Madhyalay Bandish written and composed by Mahesh Mahadev sung by Jayateerth Mevundi
- 'Man ke Mandir Ayore' Teental drut Bandish written and composed by Mahesh Mahadev sung by Jayateerth Mevundi
