= Sangeeta =

Sangeeta may refer to:

== Song and music ==
- Sangita or Sangeeta, music-related performance arts in the ancient and medieval era Indian texts
- Sangita Makarandha, an ancient work on Indian classical music

== Sangeet ==
=== Sangeeta ===
- Sangeeta Bijlani (born 1965), Miss India in 1980
- Sangeeta Krishnasamy (born 1985), Malaysian actress and model
- Sangeeta Kumari Singh Deo (born 1961), member of the Lok Sabha of India
- Sangeeta N. Bhatia (born 1968), Indian American biological engineer and professor at MIT
- Sangeeta Niranjan, Indo-Fijian businesswoman
- Sangeeta (Pakistani actress) (born 1947)
- Sangeeta Richard, domestic helper whose employment contract led to the Devyani Khobragade incident
- Sangeeta Shankar (born 1965), Indian violinist
- Sangeeta (Telugu actress)

=== Sangeetha ===
- Sangeetha Krish (born 1978), Tamil actress
- Sangeetha Choodamani, an award given to Carnatic musicians in India
- Sangeetha Kalanidhi, a title awarded yearly to an expert carnatic musician by the Madras Music Academ
- Sangeetha Kalasarathy, a yearly title awarded to an expert carnatic musician by Parthasarathy Swami Sabha
- Sangeetha Kalasikhamani, a title awarded yearly to an expert carnatic musician by the Indian Fine Arts Society
- Sangeetha Katti (born 1970), Hindustani classical vocalist in India
- Sangeetha Mahayuddham, an Indian reality-TV singing competition
- Sangeetha Rajeshwaran, playback singer in the Tamil film industry
- Sangeetha Sagara Ganayogi Panchakshara Gavai, a 1995 Indian Kannada biographical film
- Sangeetha Sringeri, (born 1996), Kannada actress
- Sangeetha Weeraratne (born 1973), actress in the Sri Lankan cinema

=== Sangita ===
- Sangita Dabir (born 1971), former cricketer
- Sangita Ghosh (born 1976), Bollywood actress and model
- Sangita Jindal (born 1962), chairman of the JSW Foundation
- Sangita Madhavan Nair (born 1976), Malayalam actress
- Sangita Makarandha, an ancient work on classical music written by Narada
- Sangita Myska, British television journalist with the BBC
- Sangita Patel (born 1979), Canadian television personality
- Sangita Ratnakara, thirteenth-century musicological text from India
- Sangita Santosham, Indian multilingual vocalist
- Sangita Tripathi (born 1968), French fencer

== See also ==
- Sangeet (disambiguation)
