= Jor (music) =

Concept in Indian classical music

- Etymology: Indian in Hindi: जोर
- Other names: Jod or Jhor
- Cultural origins: Around the 12th Century, India northern regions of the Indian subcontinent, namely India, Pakistan and Bangladesh
- Typical instruments: Santur; Sardom; Sitar; Bansuri; Esraj; Rudra Veena

Subgenres
- Raga; Tala; Alap; Dhrupad; Jhala

In Hindustani classical music, the jor (Hindi: जोर, [dʒoːr]; also spelt jod and jhor) is a formal section of composition in the long elaboration (alap) of a raga that forms the beginning of a performance. It comes after alap and precedes jhala, the climax. Jor is the instrumental equivalent of nomtom in the dhrupad vocal style of Indian music. Both have a simple pulse but no well-defined rhythmic cycle.

== Origin and terminology ==
Jor (or jod) is an instrumental interpretation of nomtom which is an introductory style that is characterised by its modest rhythm and lack of rhythmic cycle (also known as tal). Jor is present in most Hindustani classical music through the raga, as an articulate and rapid pulse that the alap transitions into, followed by jhala.

== In Hindustani music ==
Indian classical music is divided into 2 sections: Hindustani and Carnatic Music. Both musical styles inhabit the core traditions of India culture, and are portrayed as one of the most prestigious types of music. These two traditional types of music are both defined by the Sanskrit term "sangita" which refers to the fusion of all the elements, of song, instrumental music and dance. Hindustani Music is primarily found in the Northern areas of India, Bangladesh and Pakistan. The oral nature of North Indian Music allows for expressive communication between the performers and audience. Raga and Dhrupad are the two main forms of Hindustani classical music and form the prominent structure of Indian Classical Music. The musical section of Jor is prominent in Raga and follows the cyclical and linear progression of Hindustani music.

=== Raga ===
The concept of Raga (Rag) can be divided into 5 different components as proposed by Nazir Ali Jairazbhoy:

1. Scale
2. Ascending and descending line
3. Transilience
4. Emphasised notes and register
5. Intonation and obligatory embellishments

Raga is derived from Sanskrit, a classical language from South Asia, and is defined as "the act of colouring and dyeing." Amongst Indian Classical Music, raga is identified as the basic melodic framework and acts as a communication medium for two musicians. In the Raga there is a constant interplay between what is learnt from the performance, what is known and what is continued through improvisation. A raga utilises a particular scale and combines it with prototypical melodic patterns, creating combinations of tonic intervals which evoke unique emotions.

A typical raga composition is shown as sequences of events, starting with the alap and followed by the gat. A performance of raga depends on the balance between the melody and the way the audience and performer engage with the material. The Jor is situated between the Alap and Jhala, commonly known as the instrumental Alap-Jor-Jhala-Gat format. This framework details the unmetered instrumental structure of the Raga, which is performed with a regular pulse and over a wider melodic range. This format is the foundation of Dhrupad as was introduced into the West in the 20th century.

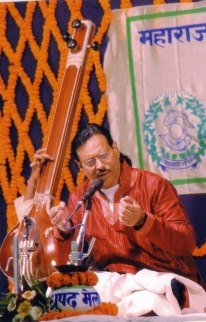
Vinod Kumar Dwivedi performing Dhrupad

In a full performance, the Raga can be split into three sections, the alap, jor and jhala. Jor and Alap acts as equivalents to one another, and the Jhala is a fast and unaccompanied part where the Jor is accelerated to reach a peak/climax. Within the Jor and Jhala, a pulse can be heard throughout. These sections, especially Jor is described as not a beat nor a rhythm but a movement that helps the Raga gain momentum in the beginning of the piece. The frameworks and methods employed may vary according to whether the raga is performed by a vocalist or an instrumentalist.

=== Dhrupad ===
Dhrupad is another form of Raga that is older and restricts the Alap, Jor and Jhala sections in such a way that is heard more frequently in present day. This genre of Indian Music formed the foundation for the Alap-Jor-Jhala-Gat structure to be welcomed to the West in the 20th Century. In Dhrupad, its distinctive feature is the climatic beginning in comparison to Raga's ascending composition. The word Dhrupad meaning ‘fixed verse’ refers to the complex opening section (Alap) allowing the other sections to grow and expand.

It is common in Dhrupad, for the Alap to be extended and unaccompanied, similar to most instrumental genres in Northern Indian music. It also focuses on a longer and more structured version of the alap-jor section. In comparison to Khayal, there is a clear structural division between the opening of Raga-alap and Jor. The Jor section in Dhrupad can be heard by its increasingly articulated and rapid pulse. Within this section, Jor follows the most common rhythmic cycle in Dhrupad, being the twelve beat. The theme of intensification is prominent as the subsequent switch from the alap to jor, is identified as more rhythmic once it reaches the Jor section. A common instrument utilised throughout Dhrupad, in the jor, is the Rudra Vina, a string instrument that evokes a melodic rhythm.

A study conducted by Napier, portrays that the end point of the Dhrupad is the articulation of the last note played in the Alap during the Jor section. It also notes that there is a large sectionalisation in the Dhrupad that is obvious in Jor as the consistency in regard to rhythmic composition is hard to recognise in Dhrupad.

== Structure ==
=== Rhythm ===
An instrumental performance of jor comprises sitarist who will pluck certain notes on a guitar or another instrument, with a consistent rhythm. A vocal performance of Jor will show a vocalist singing each phrase in equal time. A recording of two Raga performances conducted by Dhaeambir Singh Dadhyalla, indicated that Jor, along with Alap, lasts for 5 minutes which reduced the amount of tempo change throughout the beginning section.

An experiment conducted by Will, Clayton, Wertheim, Leante, Berg shows that the pulse progression in the Jor and Alap sections of Raga are distinctively different. The alap shows that there are at least nine different pulse rates, whilst in Jor there are only three. These characteristics in the Jor that distinguish it from the other sections are what creates different responses from audiences.

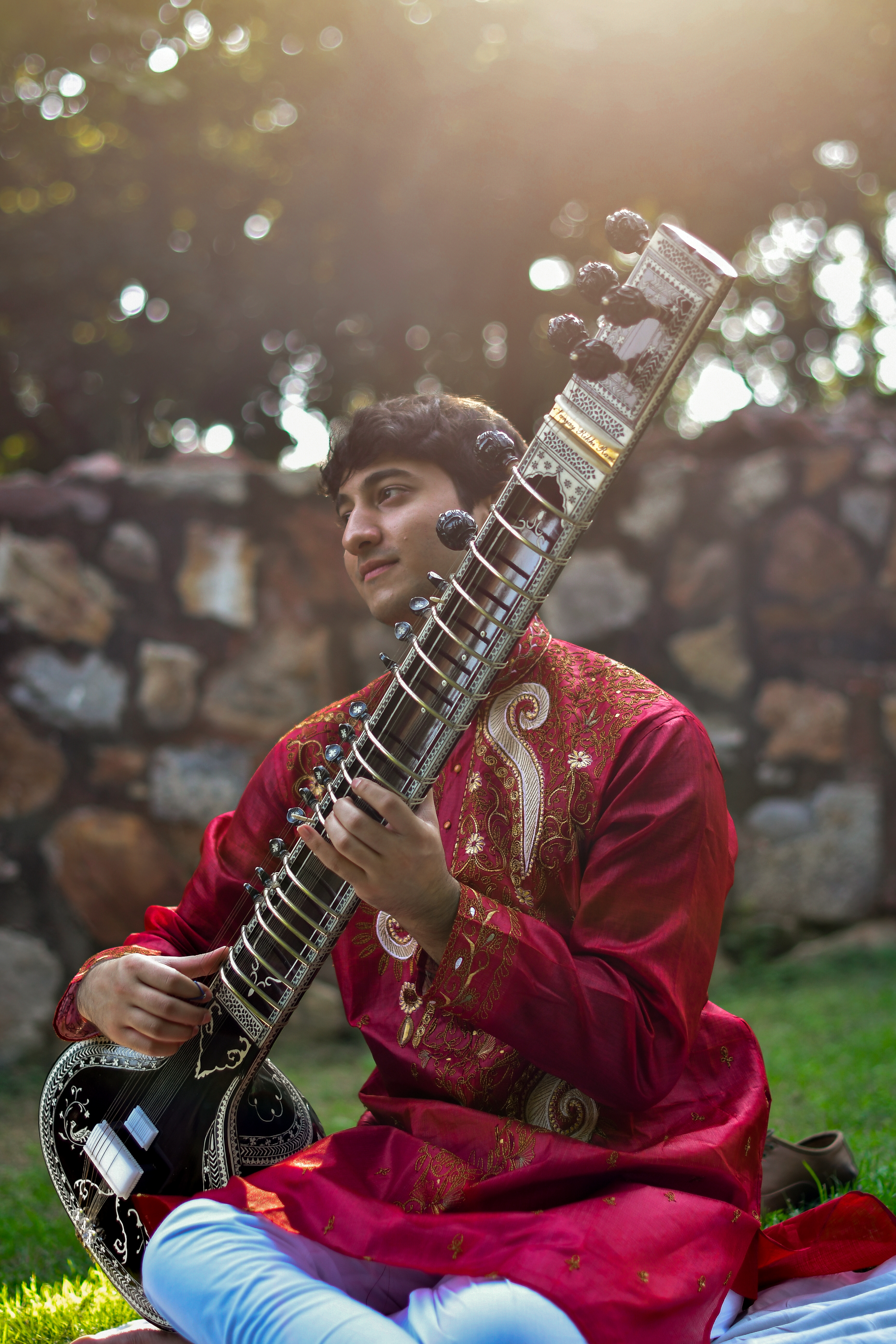
Hindustani Music played on a Sitar

In the 3-section format of the Raga, Alap-Jor-Jhala, Jor and Alap can share similarities in its composition and rhythmic style. However, Jor contains distinctive features which makes it stand out in the Raga. Jor in comparison to the Alap, is usually slow in its introduction into the Raga, but continuously builds until it reaches a fast tempo. This allows a steady transition into the Jhala, as it continues the quickened beat set by Jor. Alap is solely defined by its free rhythm, whereas Jor is limited to its regular pulse following a simple beat pattern which can be elaborated in some cases. As the Raga progresses, Jor acts as the link between the Alap and Jhala as it applies the melody introduced in the Alap and expands it through to the Jhala. The utilisation of Gamak throughout Jor, which consists of a pattern of three notes exploring a wider range or octave. Another difference between the two opening sections is the freedom granted to Jor as it moves between different pulses and speeds, whilst still focusing on certain smaller parts within the song.

=== Transition ===
The transition between the three section, alap-jor-jhala, is continuous and each part builds from its predecessor. Jor (literal meaning, "join") acts the second introduction after the alap, within a raga performance. It follows a similar structure to alap, with a shift in rhythmic style. As the Raga transitions into the Jor, the pulse is introduced by the melody instrumentalist. The Jor utilises the features of scale and patterns in the previous section (Alap) and improvises to create a new variation of these features. During jor, the performance must maintain a steady pulse with the exclusion of drums, which remains the same throughout Alap, Jor and Jhala.

In musical notation, jor follows the same notes as alap, with a constant steady beat between each. Narayan states that Jor is the "faster portion of alap, with rythmn," but deviates from Alap through its ability to concentrate on smaller sections or notes throughout the Raga. The distinction between alap and jor is made between the increase in regularity in the jor in comparison to previous alap section. Similarly, the basic sound sequence in this section is formed by chikari events to evoke a prominent timbral-rhythmic pattern. The relationship between the two, forms the definition of a bridge that is connected with the light characteristics of alap and followed by the controlled design of the raga, where the drums decide the join into the arrangement. The theme formed in the introduction of the Alap, is continued to Jor, where the drums and rhythmic beats are excluded, and the chosen melodic instrument is strummed at an accelerated pace or the performer increases the phrasing of each syllable.
