= Nritya =

Sanskrit word for Indian dance form

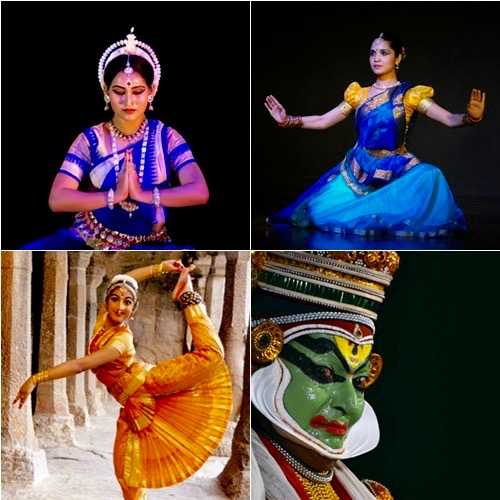
Nritya means dance in the Indian tradition.

Nritya (Sanskrit: नृत्य, IAST: nṛtya), also referred to as nritta, natana or natya, is "dance, act on the stage, act, gesticulate, play" in the Indian traditions. It is sometimes subdivided into two forms: nritta or pure dance, where the expressionless movements of a dancer play out the rhythms and phrases of the music; and nritya or expressive dance, where the dancer includes facial expression and body language to portray mood and ideas with the rhythmic movements.

== Overview ==
Nritya is broadly categorized as one of three parts of Sangita, the other two being gita (vocal music, song) and vadya (instrumental music). These ideas appear in the Vedic literature of Hinduism such as the Aitareya Brahmana, and in early post-Vedic era Sanskrit texts such as the Natya Shastra, Panchatantra, Malvikagnimitra and Kathasaritsagara.

Nritya and Nata appear in Vedic era literature. For example, Section 4.104 of the Unadi Sutras mentions Nata as "dancer, mime, actor". Panini too mentions the terms Nritya and Nartaka respectively as dance and dancer, in his treatise on Sanskrit grammar.

Nrtya

It is the spirit of both eternity and time.
It is the spirit of both man and woman.
It is the Purusha and Prakriti,
expression of the evolution of the movement,
a truly creative force that has come down to us from ages.
This embodiment of sound and rhythm,
which creates poetry of spiritual expression
is called dance or nritya.

— Rukmini Devi Arundale

The term Nritya appears in all major classical Indian dance forms as one form of their repertoire, inspired by the guidelines of the Natya Shastra. These are Nritta, Nritya and Natya:

- The Nritta performance is an abstract, fast and rhythmic aspect of the dance. The dancer performs pure dance steps by using adavu. In simple words, we can say that Nritta means pure classical dance.
- The Nritya is a slower and significant aspect of the dance that attempts to communicate feelings, storyline particularly with spiritual themes in Hindu dance traditions. In a nritya, the dance-acting expands to include silent expression of words through gestures and body motion set to musical notes. The actor articulates a legend or a spiritual message. This part of the repertoire is more than sensory enjoyment, and it aims to engage the emotions and mind of the viewer.
- The Natyam is a play, typically a team performance, but can be acted out by a solo performer where the dancer uses certain standardized body movements to indicate a new character in the underlying story. A Natyam incorporates the elements of a Nritya.

== See also ==
- Indian classical dance
- Natya shastra
- Sangita Ratnakara

== Bibliography ==
- Ambrose, Kay (1984). Classical Dances and Costumes of India. Palgrave Macmillan.
- Ragini Devi (1990). Dance Dialects of India. Motilal Banarsidass. ISBN 978-81-208-0674-0.
- Natalia Lidova (2014). Natyashastra. Oxford University Press. doi:10.1093/obo/9780195399318-0071.
- Natalia Lidova (1994). Drama and Ritual of Early Hinduism. Motilal Banarsidass. ISBN 978-81-208-1234-5.
- Williams, Drid (2004). "In the Shadow of Hollywood Orientalism: Authentic East Indian Dancing" (PDF). Visual Anthropology. 17 (1). Routledge: 69–98. doi:10.1080/08949460490274013. S2CID 29065670.
- Tarla Mehta (1995). Sanskrit Play Production in Ancient India. Motilal Banarsidass. ISBN 978-81-208-1057-0.
- Reginald Massey (2004). India's Dances: Their History, Technique, and Repertoire. Abhinav Publications. ISBN 978-81-7017-434-9.
- Emmie Te Nijenhuis (1974). Indian Music: History and Structure. BRILL Academic. ISBN 90-04-03978-3.
- Kapila Vatsyayan (2001). Bharata, the Nāṭyaśāstra. Sahitya Akademi. ISBN 978-81-260-1220-6.
- Kapila Vatsyayan (1977). Classical Indian dance in literature and the arts. Sangeet Natak Akademi. OCLC 233639306., Table of Contents
- Kapila Vatsyayan (1974). Indian classical dance. Sangeet Natak Akademi. OCLC 2238067.
- Kapila Vatsyayan (2008). Aesthetic theories and forms in Indian tradition. Munshiram Manoharlal. ISBN 978-8187586357. OCLC 286469807.
- Kapila Vatsyayan. Dance In Indian Painting. Abhinav Publications. ISBN 978-81-7017-153-9.
- Wallace Dace (1963). "The Concept of "Rasa" in Sanskrit Dramatic Theory". Educational Theatre Journal. 15 (3): 249–254. doi:10.2307/3204783. JSTOR 3204783.
- Farley P. Richmond; Darius L. Swann; Phillip B. Zarrilli (1993). Indian Theatre: Traditions of Performance. Motilal Banarsidass. ISBN 978-81-208-0981-9.
