= Rajat Kumar Mishra =

Indian musician

Rajat Mishra
- Born: November 28, 1992 (age 33); Orissa
- Occupations: Artist and tabla player

Rajat Kumar Mishra (Odia: ରଜତ କୁମାର ମିଶ୍ର; born 28 November 1992) is an Indian artist and tabla player. In 1999 he was recorded in the Guinness Book of World Records for being the youngest tabla player and in 2003 in the Limca Book of Records for playing 41 Tāla.

He received an CTS Scholarship from the Indian government and felicitations from 20 leading organisations. He also gave some important stage performances in various cities in the country.

Rajat is honoured with the National Child Award for Exceptional Achievement (2006) for his excellent performance in Tabla playing.
