= Udaka =

Udaka may refer:

- Uddaka Rāmaputta, teacher of Gautama Buddha.
- Shinji Udaka, a Japanese Baseball player.
- Udakanuketiya, a town in Sri Lanka.
- Udaka vadya, an Indian musical instrument.
