= Theka =

Basic rhythmic phrase in Indian classical music

A Theka (IAST: Ṭhekā) literally means "support, prop". The term also refers to a musical composition in classical Indian music for percussion instruments that establish a rhythm (Chanda), beats (Matras) and the metric cycle of beats (Tala) in a performance. An example is the theka of Dadra Tal: "Dha Dhi Na / Na Ti Na".

A theka is the basic rhythmic phrase of a particular tala. It is the underlying repeated pattern that shapes the time cycle of a musical expression. Theka is a term used by the drummers such as the tabla players.

== See also ==
- Raga
