= Drut (disambiguation) =

Drut is the concluding section of a vocal raga performance in Hindustani music. Drut may also refer to

- Guy Drut (born 1950), French hurdler and politician
- Drut (river), a river in Belarus, a right tributary of Dnieper
