= Sangeet =

Sangeet may refer to:

- Sangeet (music), a Sanskrit term for music of the Indian subcontinent
  - Rabindra Sangeet, songs written and composed by Rabindranath Tagore
  - Sangeet Natak, musical drama in Marathi language
  - Shyama Sangeet, a genre of Bengali devotional songs
- Sangeet (film), a 1992 Hindi film
- Sangeet Fowdar, Mauritian politician and MP for Constituency No 6 Grand Baie and Poudre D'or, Mauritius
- Sangeet Haldipur, Indian composer, one half of the duo Sangeet-Siddharth

== See also ==
- Sangeeta (disambiguation)
- Sangeeth, an Indian male given name
- Sangit Bhavana, school associated with Visva Bharati University (Shantiniketan, West Bengal, India)
