= Lari/Ladi =

Lari/Ladi (लड़ी; also called Lari/Ladi) is more or less confined to instrumental music. A nucleus of notes (of sound-syllables in case of Pakhawaj music, etc.) is formed and patterns are woven around the nucleus, which is thus repeated in varied contexts. Ladi means series. For example, in Mridang-music, to include syllables such as ‘tak dhum kit’ and then to elaborate them as ‘tak tak dhum kit, kit tak tak tak dhum kit’ is to prepare a Ladi. Ladi-s can be presented in a similar fashion on other instrument in Hindustani classical music.

== See also ==
- Khyal
- Vilambit
- Madhyalaya
- Hindustani classical music
