= Sangeeth =

Sangeeth is a given name. Notable people with the name include:

- Sangeeth Cooray (born 1995), Sri Lankan cricketer
- Sangeeth Prathap (fl. 2022), Indian film editor
- Sangeeth Sivan (1959–2024), Indian film director

== See also ==
- Sangeet (disambiguation)
