= Vadya =

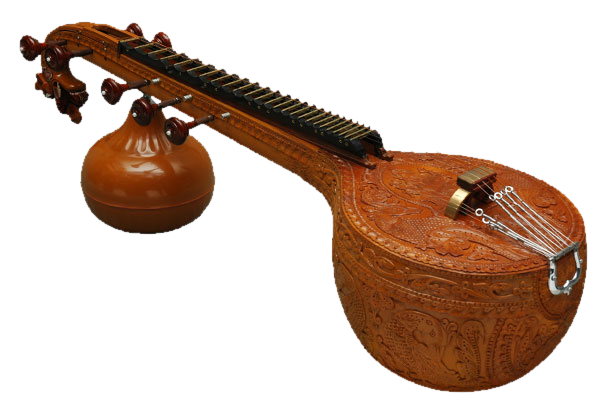
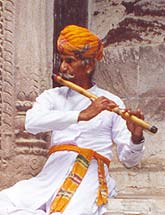
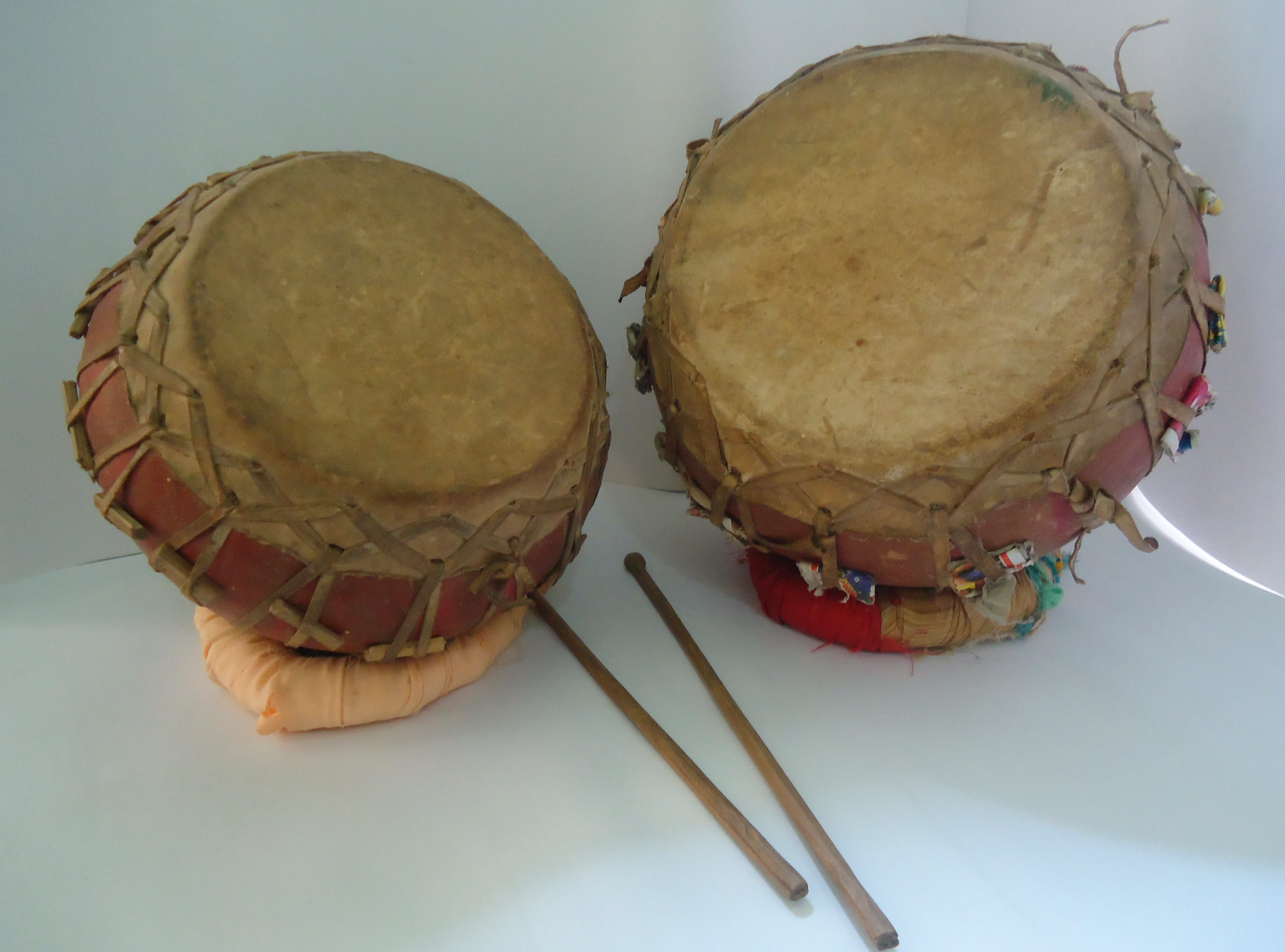
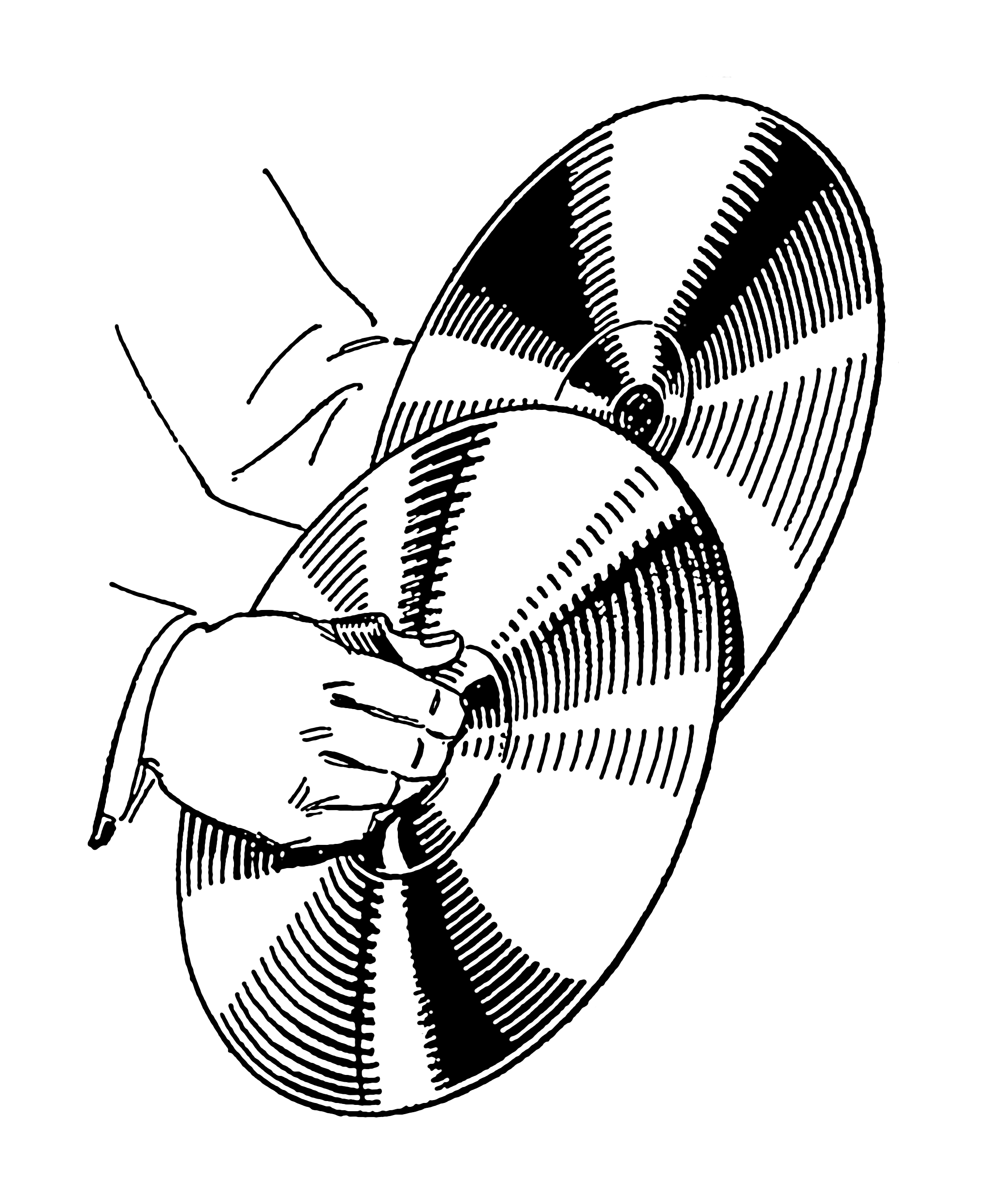
A vadya refers to instrument and the music they produce. Above examples are found in the Natya Shastra.

Vadya (Sanskrit: वाद्य, vādya), also called vadyaka or atodya, is one of the three components of sangita (musical performance arts), and refers to "instrumental music" in the Indian traditions. The other two components of sangita are gita (vocal music, song) and nritya (dance, movement). In the general sense, vadya means an instrument and the characteristic music they produce, sound, or play out.

== Indian musicology ==
The term vadya in the sense of "music, sounded, played, uttered" appears in Vedic literature such as the Aitareya Brahmana, and in early post-Vedic era Sanskrit texts such as the Natya Shastra, Panchatantra, Malvikagnimitra, and Kathasaritsagara. These texts refer to the musician or instrumental performer as vadyadhara. A stringed instrument is described with proportional lengths in Jaiminiya Brahmana and Aitareya Aranyaka, and these are compared to poetical meters. The 17th-century text Sangita Darpana defines sangita (musical arts) as "gītam vādyam tathā nrityam trayan sangīta muchyate", meaning sangita comprises gīta (vocal music), vādya (instrumental music), and nritya (dance).

=== Classification of instruments ===
Sanskrit literature describes four types of vadya:

- Tantu: stringed musical instrument (chordophone)
- Susira: hollow musical instrument (aerophone)
- Ghana: solid musical instrument (idiophone)
- Avanaddha: covered musical instrument (membranophone)

=== Ensembles and orchestras ===
The chapter 14 of the Saṅgītaśiromaṇi describes musical ensembles based on a collective performance of vadya instruments by musicians, and it calls such a band orchestra as a kutapa.

== Cultural exchange ==
The term vadya also appears in the Buddhist Sanskrit text Sukhavativyuha, influential in the Chinese and Japanese traditions, which Luis Gomez translates as "instrumental music".

In Hindu-Javanese music tradition, vadya is called vaditra. According to Roger Blench, most scholars consider the term valiha (a Madagascar tube zither instrument) to be rooted in the Sanskrit term vadya, reflecting a period of cultural exchange over the Indian Ocean.

== See also ==
- Indian classical music
- List of Indian musical instruments
- Natya shastra
- Tala
- Udaka vadya
