= Sangita Makarandha =

Ancient work on classical music

Sangita Makaranda is an ancient work on classical music (sangita) written by Narada. This work is a rare collection of definitions, descriptions and comments on all the essential music by other ancient reputed authors from Bharata Muni to Sharangdeva. Its main feature is the treatment of Ragas; categorizing them as male, female and neuter.

== The three distinct stages ==
It also hints on the uniqueness of the raga-nomenclaturing. On close study of it, one learns of three distinct stages on the nomenclaturing of the Indian ragas.

- Stage one refers Bharata's Natyashastra (prior 2nd century BC). It is the stage of raga-nomenclature when the ragas were named after the saliant swara of the ragas. For example, after Shadja swara, originated the name of the Raga called shadja; after Arshabha swara originated the name of Arsharbha Raga; and after Gandhari swara was named the Gaandhari Raga, the last one being still in currency.
- In the second stage, the Ragas were named after different jana (tribes or the clans) dwelling in different geographical locations. For example, after Shaka tribe was named Shakatilak Raga or Shakamishrat variants of Shaka Raga; after Pulinda tribe was named the Pulinda Raga; after Abhira clan was named Abhiri Raga; after Savara tribe was named Saviri or Saverka. Similarly after Malava, Andhra, Gurjar, Kambhoja (Kamboja) tribes were named Ragas Malvika, Andhrri, Gurjari and Kambhoji (Kamboji) respectively, with all their variants.
- In the third stage, the ragas were named after the janapada or desha or country of their origin. For example, after Bengal was named Bangal-Raga; after Sindhudesha was named Saindhvi Raga; after Sauvira Janapada was named Sauviri or Sauvirak Raga; after Saurashtra was named the Saurashtri (or Sorathi or Surat or Surat-malar); and after Karnata janapada was named Karnati Raga etc. Similarly, the Kambhoji Raga or Ragini which is now very popular in southern India was named after the Kambhoja janapada. Scholars believe that the Kambhoji raga or ragini had probably originated in the jana rather than the janapada stage. This implies that the basic tune of raga Kamboji or Kambhoji must have evolved during epic or even pre-epic times.

== See also ==
- Sangita Ratnakara
