= Thok =

Indian classical music

Thok (ठोक), in Indian classical music, is a post-jhala phase of elaboration and is replete with accents. The plectrum, etc., is actually struck on adjacent wooden or metal portion of the instrument to introduce the ‘thok’ (strike) effect. After jhala alap reaches the drut+drut phase because of the ‘thok’, stresses become important. In vocal music, more stressed, meaningless syllables such as ‘dretum’, etc., actualize the phase in a raga in Hindustani classical music.

== See also ==
- Khyal
- Vilambit
- Madhyalaya
- Hindustani classical music
