= Buka (music) =

The buka (Javanese for "opening") is the short introduction to pieces of gamelan. It is also called the bubuka or bubuka opaq-opaq.

Buka are generally played by a single instrument in a free rhythm, until the last few notes when the kendhang comes in to set the tempo and cue the whole gamelan, which joins on the final note, with the first gong ageng.

Buka are often played by the bonang barung in the so-called "loud style." In other styles, they can be played by the rebab, gendér, or kendhang alone, or may be sung, especially by the dalang in a wayang performance.

Mantle Hood emphasizes the importance of the buka in the determination of the pathet of a gamelan composition, and analyzes it as an extended elaboration on the typical cadential formulas. He compares it to the alap of Hindustani classical music in its role of setting the mood and set of pitches.
