= Eka tala =

Eka tala is one of the sapta (seven) talas (beats) bases in Indian Carnatic classical music.

Its cycle is of the form of a single laghu, which consists in a first beat followed by a variable count. Traditionally, this base of beats can produce five meter patterns.

== Forms ==
There are five forms (jatis) by varying the number of beats in the cycle. For example, chatusra eka taala will have four beats, with the related action being a single beat with the palm and then three beats with the movement of the outer three fingers in one cycle.

When the type of the laghu (number of beats) is not specified, eka tala is understood to be chaturasra eka (4 beats).Some Bharatiyar songs based on Eka taalam are "Villinai"( Tisra Ekam), Theeraatha Villaiyattu (Khanda Ekam).

=== Symbols ===
Jaathi - Tala	Symbol	No. of aksharams (beats)
Tisra Eka	|_{3}	3
Chatusra Eka	|_{4}	4
Khanda Eka	|_{5}	5
Misra Eka	|_{7}	7
Sankeerna Eka	|_{9}	9
