= Jayateerth Mevundi =

Pandit Jayateerth Mevundi
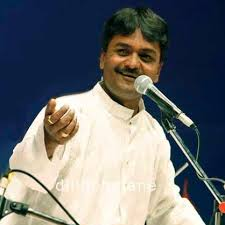

Background information
- Born: Hubli, Karnataka
- Origin: Hubli
- Occupations: Hindustani Classical Vocalist, Playback Singer

Pandit Jayateerth Mevundi is an Indian classical vocalist of the Kirana gharana (singing style).

== Early life ==
Jayateerth was born in Hubli, Karnataka. He was brought up in a musical environment, and was encouraged by his mother Sudhabai who was fond of singing Purandara Dasa kritis.

He is an 'A Top' graded artist at All India Radio.

== Discography ==
=== Hindustani classical ===
- Bilaskhani Todi, Abhogi Kanada and Basant, Alurkar Music House 2000
- Yaman & Marwa, Alurkar Music House 2000
- Lalit, Gunakali and Shudh Sarang, Alurkar Music House 2000
- Darbari Kanada with an additional track 'Jamuna Ke Teer' in Bhairavi, Dreams Entertainment, 2010
- 'Giridhar Gopal Shyam' Vilambith and Madhyalay Bandish, 'Man ke Mandir Ayore' drut Bandish in new Rag Bhimsen - Invented, Written and Composed by Indian film and classical composer Mahesh Mahadev

=== Kannada devotional ===
- Ranga Baro Panduranga Baro - Dasara Padgalu, Ganasampada Live Cassettes
- Narayana Te Namo Namo, Ganasampada Live Cassettes 2007

=== Kannada film songs ===
- Song Mysore Desh Amara Desh from the movie Kallarali Hoovagi, Akash Audio 2006

=== Marathi film songs ===
- Songs Anandache Dohi and Deh Pandurang from the movie Pushpak Vimaan 2018
- 'Dhyan Karu Jata' Abhang composed by Mahesh Mahadev in his new Raga Mukthipradayini, Written by Samarth Ramdas, Released by Audio Label PM Audios in 2019

He also wrote and sang a song on Shri Satyatma Tirtha, philosopher and pontiff of Uttaradhi Mutt. He posted the video on his YouTube channel - Satyatmateerth Swamiji Bandish by Pt. Jayateerth Mevundi.
