= Sangita Ratnakara =

Sanskrit musicological text

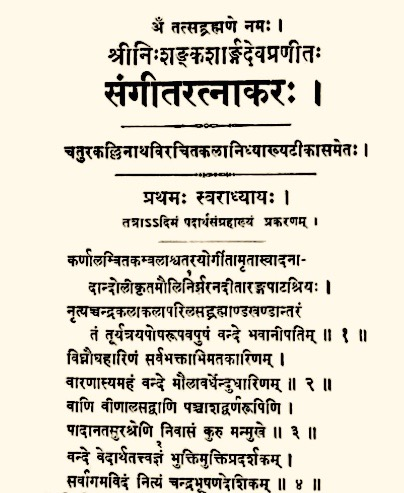
Saṃgītaratnākara Sanskrit manuscript, verses 1.1.1-1.1.4.

The Sangita-Ratnakara, संगीतरत्नाकर, (IAST: Saṃgītaratnākara), literally "Ocean of Music ", is one of the most important musicological texts from India. Composed by Śārṅgadeva (शार्ङ्गदेव) in Sanskrit during the 13th century, both Carnatic music and Hindustani music traditions of Indian classical music regard it as a definitive text. The author was a part of the court of King Simhana (r. 1210–1247) of the Yādava dynasty whose capital was Devagiri, Maharashtra.

The text is divided into seven chapters. The first six chapters, Svaragatadhyaya, Ragavivekadhyaya, Prakirnakadhyaya, Prabandhadhyaya, Taladhyaya and Vadyadhyaya deal with the various aspects of music and musical instruments, while the last chapter Nartanadhyaya deals with dance. The medieval era text is one of the most complete historical Indian treatises on the structure, technique, and reasoning on music theory that has survived into the modern era, and is a comprehensive voluminous text on ragas (chapter 2) and talas (chapter 5).

The text is comprehensive synthesis of ancient and medieval musical knowledge of India. The text has been frequently quoted by later Indian musicologists in their music and dance-related literature. Significant commentaries on the text include the Sangitasudhakara of Simhabhupala (c. 1330) and the Kalanidhi of Kallinatha (c. 1430).

== Author ==
Sangita Ratnakara was written by Śārṅgadeva, also spelled Sarangadeva or Sharangadeva. Śārṅgadeva was born in a Brahmin family of Kashmir. In the era of Islamic invasion of the northwest regions of the Indian subcontinent and the start of Delhi Sultanate, his family migrated south and settled in the Hindu kingdom in the Deccan region near Ellora Caves (Maharashtra). Śārṅgadeva worked as an accountant with freedom to pursue his music interests in the court of King Simhana (r. 1210–1247) of the Yadava dynasty.

== Content ==
The text is a Sanskrit treatise on Sangita (IAST: Saṃgīta), or music-related performance arts tradition. Sangita is stated by the text as a composite performance art consisting of Gita (melodic forms, song), Vadya (instrumental music) and Nrtta (dance, movement).

The 13th-century Sangita Ratnakara classifies Sangita into two kinds: Marga-sangita and Desi-sangita. Marga refers to the classical techniques taught by Bharata in Natya Shastra. Desi Sangita refers to regional improvisations that may not follow the classical rules and structure for the music and performance arts.

The text has seven chapters:

1. Svaragatādhyāya (sound system)
2. Rāgavivekādhyāya (raga)
3. Prakīrņakādhyāya (performing practice)
4. Prabandhādhyāya (compositions, poetic meter)
5. Tālādhyāya (tala)
6. Vādyādhyāya (musical instruments)
7. Nartanādhyāya (dance)

The first chapter has eight sections. It opens with reverential verses to the Hindu god Shiva, who is called the "embodiment of sound, sung about by the entire world" and the one delighting according to the Vedas. The author pays homage to his ancestors, then to ancient scholars such as Bharata, Matanga, Dattila and Narada, as well as major gods and goddesses of Hinduism in first section of the first chapter. In the second section, there is hardly any mention of music or dance, rather Sarngadeva presents his metaphysical and physiological beliefs, as well as credits the origin of music to the Samaveda. He presents musical topics and definitions of musical concepts starting with section three of the first chapter, with frequent mentions of Shiva and the Hindu goddess Saraswati.

According to Sarngadeva's verses 27-30 of the section 1.1, song is everywhere, in the cry of a baby, in the beats of nature, in the pulse of life, in every human act of Dharma, Artha, Kama and Moksha. The sections 3 through 8 of the first chapter describe nada (sound), svara (tone), śruti (microinterval), gramas (primary scales), murcchanas (derivative scales), varna (color), jati (mode), alankara (embellishment), giti (singing styles), meters and other basic musical concepts.

The suddha (pristine) svaras are those in the Sama Veda, states the text.

Svara and sruti
Svara (Long)	Sadja (षड्ज)	Rsabha (ऋषभ)	Gandhara (गान्धार)	Madhyama (मध्यम)	Pañcama (पञ्चम)	Dhaivata (धैवत)	Nisada (निषाद)
Svara (Short)	Sa (स)	Ri (रि)	Ga (ग)	Ma (म)	Pa (प)	Dha (ध)	Ni (नि)
Srutis in Sangita Ratnakara	Tivra, Kumadvanti, Manda, Chandovati	Dayavati, Ranjini, Raktika	Rudri, Krodhi	Vajrika, Prasarini, Priti, Marjani	Kshiti, Rakta, Sandipini, Alapini	Madanti, Rohini, Ramya	Ugra, Kshobini

The mammoth text describes 253 ragas in chapter 2, while chapter 5 presents all classical (marga) and 120 regional Talas. Chapter 3 opens with a summary of sangita practice in the Vedic literature, then presents the post-Vedic developments and recommendations for practice. It includes a description of theatre design, make up and decoration of the artists, performance standards for instrumentalists and singers, as well as methods for improvising on a musical theme.

In the 6th chapter, Sarang Deva describes the ancient and pre-13th century musical instruments of India into four class of musical instruments: chordophones, aerophones, membranophones and idiophones. He mentions physical description of the instruments, how to play them and the repertoire that best flows with each musical instrument. In the 7th chapter of this massive text is a relatively brief description of classical and regional dance forms of India, including Kathak. Its dance chapter describes expressive styles, posture and body language as a form of silent communication of ideas, the rasa theory categorized through nine emotions, and the art of individual movements of a dancer.

According to Peter Fletcher – a professor of Music and Drama, the Sangita Ratnakara states that "the composer was expected to be a competent performer, but he also made clear that the composer was expected to know his audience, and how their minds work, rising above his own likes and dislikes, in order to bring delight to everyone". Sarangadeva's views on music, states Fletcher, exemplified ideas in the Bhagavad Gita relating to non-attachment.

== Importance ==
Sańgītaratnākara is a very important text and this is evident from the many commentaries written on it. It remains as a reference text in the contemporary times among the Indian musicologists and music schools.

The text attracted secondary literature called bhasya in the Indian tradition. Two of the many commentaries on the text have been translated into English. These are Sańgītasudhākara of Simbabhūpāla and Kalānidhi of Kallinātha. Sańgītaratnākara compiles information found in earlier works like Nāţyaśāstra, Dattilam, Bŗhaddēśī, Sarasvatī-hŗdayālańkāra-hāra, ideas of Abhinavagupta on Nāţyaśāstra, as well as others. Sarangdeva expanded the more ancient and medieval ideas as well, such as with his ideas on lasyas. The text forms a useful bridge between the ancient, medieval and the post-13th century periods of music history in India.

== See also ==
- Dance of India
- Hindu texts
- Indian classical dance
- Indian classical music
- Sangita Makarandha
- Music of India
