= Indian classical music =

Classical music from the Indian subcontinent

Indian classical music is the classical music of the Indian subcontinent. It is generally described using terms like Shastriya Sangeet and Marg Sangeet. It has two major traditions: the North Indian classical music known as Hindustani and the South Indian expression known as Carnatic. Hindustani music emphasizes improvisation and exploration of all aspects of a raga, while Carnatic performances tend to be short composition-based. However, the two systems continue to have more common features than differences. Another unique classical music tradition from the eastern part of India is Odissi music, which has evolved over the last two thousand years.

The roots of the classical music of India are found in the Vedic literature of Hinduism and the ancient Natyashastra, the classic Sanskrit text on performing arts by Bharata Muni. The 13th century Sanskrit text Sangeeta-Ratnakara of Sarangadeva is regarded as the definitive text by both the Hindustani music and the Carnatic music traditions.

Indian classical music has two foundational elements, raga and tala. The raga, based on a varied repertoire of swara (notes including microtones), forms the fabric of a deeply intricate melodic structure, while the tala measures the time cycle. The raga gives an artist a palette to build the melody from sounds, while the tala provides them with a creative framework for rhythmic improvisation using time. In Indian classical music the space between the notes is often more important than the notes themselves, and it traditionally eschews Western classical concepts such as harmony, counterpoint, chords, or modulation.

== History ==
The root of music in ancient India is found in the Vedic literature of Hinduism. Around 1250 AD, sangeeta (loosely, "music") was said to be made of three components: melody (gita), drumming (vadya), and dance (nrtta). As these fields developed, sangeeta became a distinct genre of art, in a form equivalent to contemporary music. This likely occurred before the time of Yāska (c. 500 BCE), since he includes these terms in his nirukta studies, one of the six Vedanga of ancient Indian tradition. Some of the ancient texts of Hinduism such as the Samaveda (c. 1000 BCE) are structured entirely to melodic themes, it is sections of Rigveda set to music.

=== Samaveda ===
The Samaveda is organized into two formats. One part is based on the musical meter, another by the aim of the rituals. The text is written with embedded coding, where swaras (octave notes) are either shown above or within the text, or the verse is written into parvans (knot or member); in simple words, this embedded code of swaras is like the skeleton of the song. The swaras have about 12 different forms and different combinations of these swaras are made to sit under the names of different ragas. The specific code of a song clearly tells us what combination of swaras are present in a specific song. The lyrical part of the song is called "sahityam" and sahityam is just like singing the swaras altogether but using the lyrics of the song. The code in the form of swaras have even the notation of which note to be sung high and which one low. The hymns of Samaveda contain melodic content, form, rhythm and metric organization. This structure is, however, not unique or limited to Samaveda. The Rigveda embeds the musical meter too, without the kind of elaboration found in the Samaveda. For example, the Gayatri mantra contains three metric lines of exactly eight syllables, with an embedded ternary rhythm.

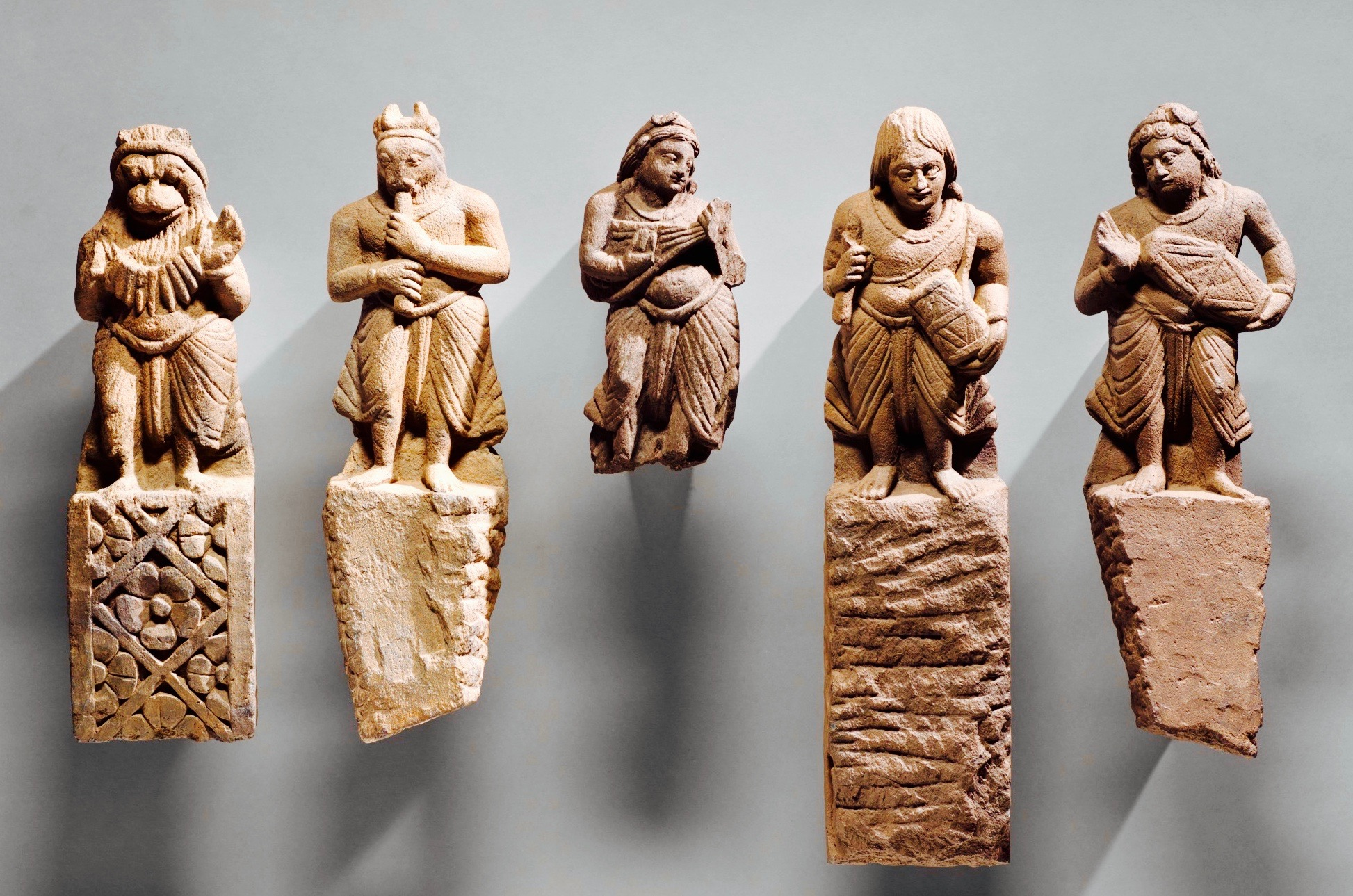
Five Gandharvas (celestial musicians) from 4th–5th century CE, northwest South Asia, carrying the four types of musical instruments. Gandharvas are discussed in Vedic era literature.

=== Origins ===
In the ancient traditions of Hinduism, two musical genre appeared, namely Gandharva (formal, composed, ceremonial music) and Gana (informal, improvised, entertainment music). The Gandharva music also implied celestial, divine associations, while the Gana also implied singing. The Vedic Sanskrit musical tradition had spread widely in the Indian subcontinent, and according to Rowell, the ancient Tamil classics make it "abundantly clear that a cultivated musical tradition existed in South India as early as the last few pre-Christian centuries".

The classic Sanskrit text Natya Shastra is at the foundation of the numerous classical music and dance traditions of India. Before Natyashastra was finalized, the ancient Indian traditions had classified musical instruments into four groups based on their acoustic principle (how they work, rather than the material they are made of) for example flute which works with gracious in and out flow of air. These four categories are accepted as given and are four separate chapters in the Natyashastra, one each on stringed instruments (chordophones), hollow instruments (aerophones), solid instruments (idiophones), and covered instruments (membranophones).

Of these, states Levis Rowell, the idiophone in the form of "small bronze cymbals" were used for tala. Almost the entire chapter of Natyashastra on idiophones, by Bharata, is a theoretical treatise on the system of tala. Time keeping with idiophones was considered a separate function than that of percussion (membranophones), in the early Indian thought on music theory.

The early 13th century Sanskrit text Sangitaratnakara (literally, "Ocean of Music and Dance"), by Sarngadeva patronized by King Sighana of the Yadava dynasty in Maharashtra, mentions and discusses ragas and talas. He identifies seven tala families, then subdivides them into rhythmic ratios, presenting a methodology for improvization and composition that continues to inspire modern era Indian musicians. Sangitaratnakara is one of the most complete historic medieval era Hindu treatises on this subject that has survived into the modern era, that relates to the structure, technique and reasoning behind ragas and talas.

The centrality and significance of music in ancient and early medieval India is also expressed in numerous temple and shrine reliefs, in Buddhism, Hinduism and Jainism, such as through the carving of musicians with cymbals at the fifth century Pavaya temple sculpture near Gwalior, and the Ellora Caves.

=== Texts ===
The post-Vedic era historical literature relating to Indian classical music has been extensive. The ancient and medieval texts are primarily in Sanskrit (Hinduism), but major reviews of music theory, instruments and practice were also composed in regional languages such as Kannada, Odia, Pali (Buddhism), Prakrit (Jainism), Tamil and Telugu. While numerous manuscripts have survived into the modern era, many original works on Indian music are believed to be lost, and are known to have existed only because they are quoted and discussed in other manuscripts on classical Indian music. Many of the encyclopedic Puranas contain large chapters on music theory and instruments, such as the Bhagavata Purana, the Markandeya Purana, the Vayu Purana, the Linga Purana, and the Visnudharmottara Purana.

The most cited and influential among these texts are the Sama Veda, Natya shastra (classic treatise on music theory, Gandharva), Dattilam, Brihaddesi (treatise on regional classical music forms), and Sangita Ratnakara (definitive text for Carnatic and Hindustani traditions). Most historic music theory texts have been by Hindu scholars. Some classical music texts were also composed by Buddhists and Jain scholars, and in 16th century by Muslim scholars. These are listed in the attached table.

Classical Indian music texts
Title	Author	Century	Religion	Notability
Samaveda	-	c. 1000 BCE	Hinduism	Scripture set to music
Dattilam	Dattila	c. 4th century BCE-2nd century CE	Hinduism	The text marks the transition from the sama-gayan (ritual chants), to gandharva music
Natyasastra	Bharata Muni	c. 200 BCE–200 CE	Hinduism	Oldest surviving complete Hindu text on music theory and performance arts
(Lost texts)	Vishakhila, Sardula, Visnudharmottara	c. 300–500 CE	Hinduism	Cited by medieval authors
(Lost text)	Rahul	c. 5th century CE	Buddhism	Cited by medieval authors
Brihaddesi	Matanga	c. 800–900 CE	Hinduism	Survives in parts, theory of regional music forms (entertainment), Murchana system
Abhinavabharati	Abhinavagupta	c. 900–1000 CE	Hinduism	Theory of rasa
Sarasvati Hridyalankara	Nanyadeva	c. 1080 CE	Hinduism	Music theory, appendix on Natyashastra bhasya
Sangita Sudhakara	Haripala	c. 1175 CE	Hinduism	
Abhilasitartha Cintamani	Somesvara	c. 12th century CE	Hinduism	Survives in parts, Murchana system, ragas
Sangita Ratnavali	Somabhupala	c. 1180 CE	Hinduism	
Sangita Samayasara	Parsvadeva	c. 1200 CE	Hinduism	Theory of gamakas
Sangita Ratnakara	Sarngadeva	c. 1230 CE	Hinduism	Systematizes raga, prakirnaka, prabandha, tala, vadya and nritya; Definitive text to Carnatic and Hindustani classical music
Sringarahara	Raja Sakambhari	c. 1300 CE	Hinduism	Directory of ancient ragas, 89 derivative ragas and 120 talas
Rasatatvasamuccaya	Allaraja	c. 1300 CE	Hinduism	Four chapters to classical music
Sangitopanisadasara	Suddhakalasa	c. 1350 CE	Jainism	Music theory, includes rare talas
Balabodhan	unknown	c. 1350 CE	Hinduism	Review and quotes music texts believed to be lost
Visvapradip	Bhuvanananda	c. 1350 CE	Hinduism	A major review on raga, tala, musical instruments
Sangitacandra	Allaraja	c. 14th century CE	Hinduism	Commented by 17th century Nepalese king Jyotirmal
Sangita Dipika	Madhava Bhatta	c. 1400 CE	Hinduism	Raga-ragini system
Sangita Raj	Kumbhakarna	c. 1449 CE	Hinduism	A review
Svaramelakalanidhi	Ramamatya	c. 16th century CE	Hinduism	Carnatic music, mela system
Raga Mala, Raga Manjari, Sadraga Candrodaya	Pundarika Vittala	c. 16th century CE	Hinduism	Carnatic music, mentions Persian maqam
Lahjat-i Sikandar Shahi	Umar Sama Yahya	c. 16th century CE	Islam	Hindustani music, includes a review of Natya Shastra and Sangita Ratnakara
Rasakaumudi	Srikantha	c. 16th century CE	Jainism	A review of music systems
Sangita Sudha	Raghunatha Thanjavur	c. 1620 CE	Hinduism	Carnatic, Three languages, musical instruments, 264 ragas, 50 popular ragas
Sangita Cudamani	Govinda	c. 1680 CE	Hinduism	Carnatic, 72 melakartas, musical instruments innovations

== Major traditions ==
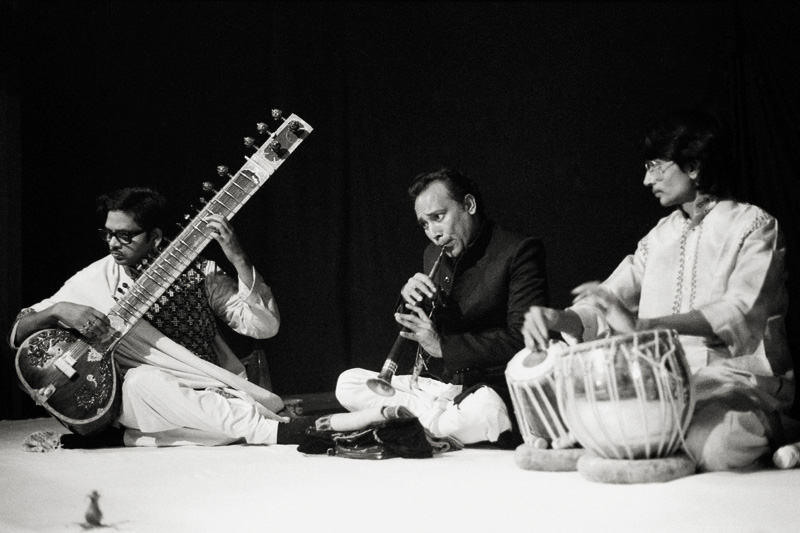
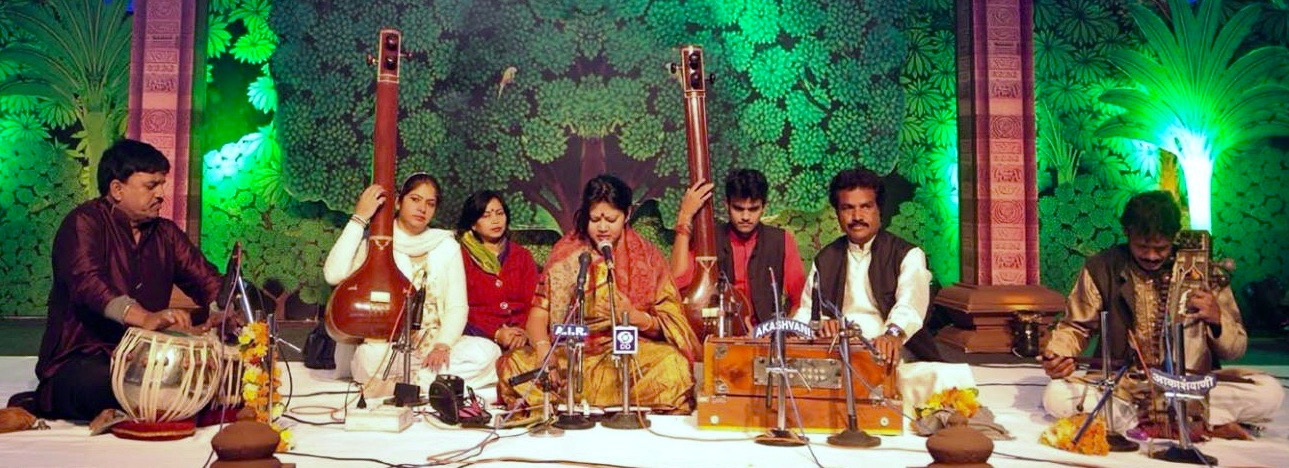
Indian classical music performances

The classical music tradition of the ancient and medieval Indian subcontinent (modern Bangladesh, India, Pakistan) were a generally integrated system through the 14th century, after which the socio-political turmoil of the Delhi Sultanate era isolated the north from the south. The music traditions of the North and South India were not considered distinct until about the 16th century, but after that the traditions acquired distinct forms. North Indian classical music is called Hindustani, while the South Indian expression is called Carnatic (sometimes spelled as Karnatic). According to Nazir Ali Jairazbhoy, the North Indian tradition acquired its modern form after the 14th or the 15th century.

Indian classical music has historically adopted and evolved with many regional styles, such as the Bengali classical tradition. This openness to ideas led to assimilation of regional folk innovations, as well as influences that arrived from outside the subcontinent. For example, Hindustani music assimilated Arabian and Persian influences. This assimilation of ideas was upon the ancient classical foundations such as raga, tala, matras as well as the musical instruments. For example, the Persian Rāk is probably a pronunciation of Raga. According to Hormoz Farhat, Rāk has no meaning in modern Persian language, and the concept of raga is unknown in Persia.

=== Carnatic music ===
If Hindustani music is taken in as an entirely new form of music created from Indian classical music and Persian music, then Carnatic music was a form from the south of the sub-continent that developed further natively after this divergence. Carnatic music is the ancient Indian classical music that became distinct after Hindustani music was established. It is dated back to ancient periods, but was only distinct after Hindustani music was established. Purandara Dasa (1484–1564) was a Hindu composer and musicologist who lived in Hampi of the Vijayanagara Empire. He is considered Pithamaha (literally, "great father or grandfather") of the Carnatic music. Purandara Dasa was a monk and a devotee of the Hindu god Krishna (Vishnu, Vittal avatar). He systematised classical Indian music theory and developed exercises for musicians to learn and perfect their art. He travelled widely sharing and teaching his ideas, and influenced numerous South Indian and Maharashtra Bhakti movement musicians. These exercises, his teachings about raga, and his systematic methodology called Suladi Sapta Tala (literally, "primordial seven talas") remains in use in contemporary times. The efforts of Purandara Dasa in the 16th century began the Carnatic style of Indian classical music.

Saraswati is the goddess of music and knowledge in the Indian tradition.

Carnatic music, from South India, tends to be more rhythmically intensive and structured than Hindustani music. Examples of this are the logical classification of ragas into melakartas, and the use of fixed compositions similar to Western classical music. Carnatic raga elaborations are generally much faster in tempo and shorter than their equivalents in Hindustani music. In addition, accompanists have a much larger role in Carnatic concerts than in Hindustani concerts. Today's typical concert structure was put in place by the vocalist Ariyakudi Ramanuja Iyengar. The opening piece is called a varnam, and is a warm-up for the musicians. A devotion and a request for a blessing follows, then a series of interchanges between ragams (unmetered melody) and Tanam (the ornamentation within a melorhythmic cycle, equivalent to the jor). This is intermixed with hymns called krithis. The pallavi or theme from the raga then follows. Carnatic pieces also have notated lyrical poems that are reproduced as such, possibly with embellishments and treatments according to the performer's ideology, referred to as Manodharmam.

Primary themes include worship, descriptions of temples, philosophy, and nayaka-nayika (Sanskrit "hero-heroine") themes. Tyagaraja (1759–1847), Muthuswami Dikshitar (1776–1827) and Syama Sastri (1762–1827) have been the important historic scholars of Carnatic music. According to Eleanor Zelliot, Tyagaraja is known in the Carnatic tradition as one of its greatest composers, and he reverentially acknowledged the influence of Purandara Dasa.

A common belief is that Carnatic music represents a more ancient and refined approach to classical music, whereas Hindustani music has evolved by external influences.

=== Hindustani music ===
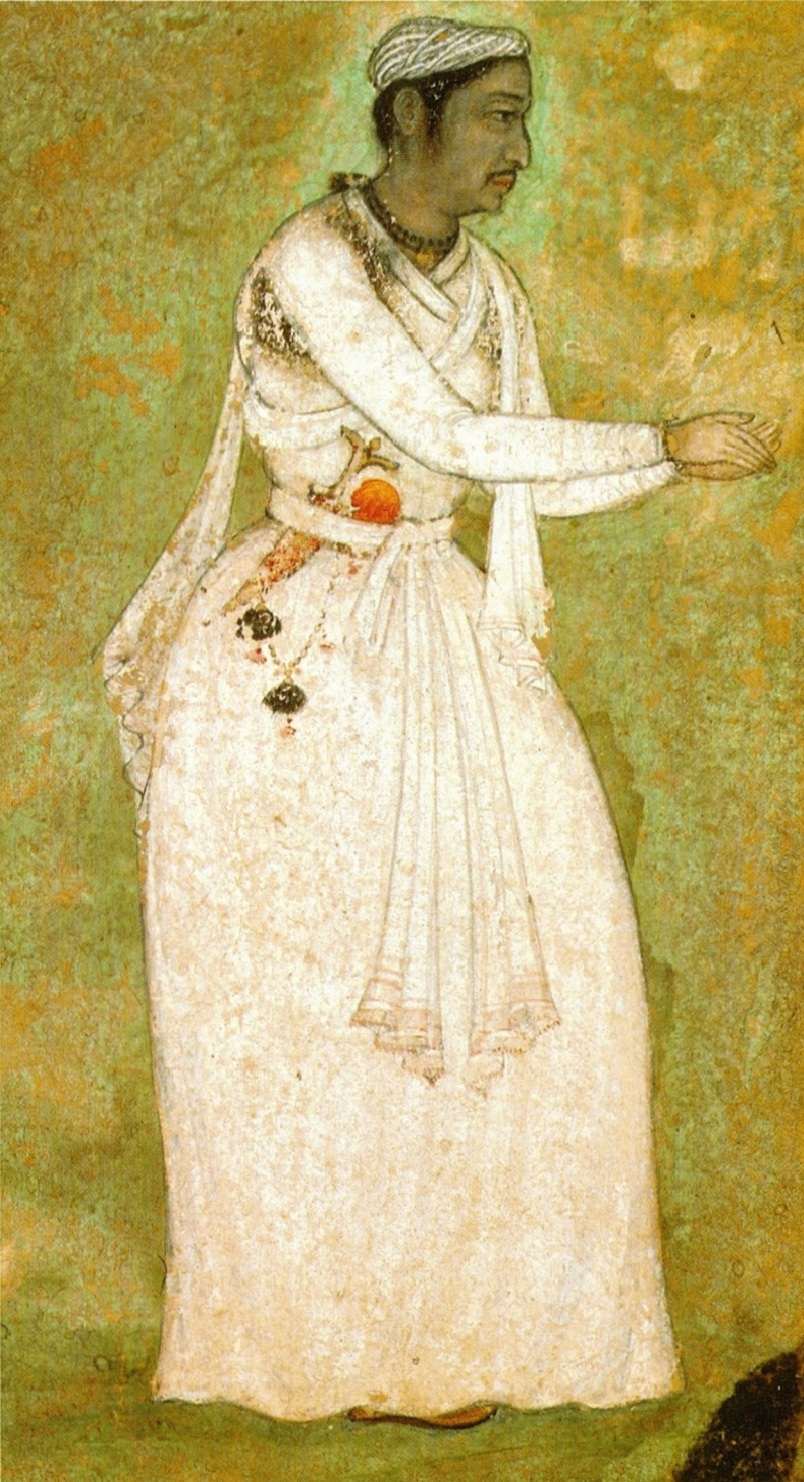
The 16th century musician Tansen, who about the age of 60 joined the Mughal Akbar court. For many Hindustani music gharanas (schools), he is their founder.

It is unclear when the process of differentiation of Hindustani music started. The process may have started in the 14th century courts of the Delhi Sultans. According to Jairazbhoy, the North Indian tradition likely acquired its modern form after the 14th or after the 15th century. The development of Hindustani music reached a peak during the reign of Akbar. During this 16th century period, Tansen studied music and introduced musical innovations, for about the first sixty years of his life with patronage of the Hindu king Ram Chand of Gwalior, and thereafter performed at the Muslim court of Akbar. Many musicians consider Tansen as the founder of Hindustani music.

Tansen's style and innovations inspired many, and many modern gharanas (Hindustani music teaching houses) link themselves to his lineage. The Muslim courts discouraged Sanskrit, and encouraged technical music. Such constraints led Hindustani music to evolve in a different way than Carnatic music.

Hindustani music style is mainly found in North India, Pakistan and Bangladesh. Prior to the Taliban's ban on music, it also had a strong presence in Afghanistan. It exists in four major forms: Dhrupad, Khyal (or Khayal), Tarana, and the semi-classical Thumri. Dhrupad is ancient, Khyal evolved from it, Thumri evolved from Khyal. There are three major schools of Thumri: Lucknow gharana, Banaras gharana and Punjabi gharana. These weave in folk music innovations. Tappa is the most folksy, one which likely existed in Rajasthan and Punjab region before it was systematized and integrated into classical music structure. It became popular, with the Bengali musicians developing their own Tappa.

Khyal is the modern form of Hindustani music, and the term literally means "imagination". It is significant because it was the template for Sufi musicians among the Islamic community of India, and Qawwals sang their folk songs in the Khyal format.

Dhrupad (or Dhruvapad), the ancient form described in the Hindu text Natyashastra, is one of the core forms of classical music found all over the Indian subcontinent. The word comes from Dhruva which means immovable and permanent.

A Dhrupad has at least four stanzas, called Sthayi (or Asthayi), Antara, Sanchari and Abhoga. The Sthayi part is a melody that uses the middle octave's first tetrachord and the lower octave notes. The Antara part uses the middle octave's second tetrachord and the higher octave notes. The Sanchari part is the development phase, which builds using parts of Sthayi and Antara already played, and it uses melodic material built with all the three octave notes. The Abhoga is the concluding section, that brings the listener back to the familiar starting point of Sthayi, albeit with rhythmic variations, with diminished notes like a gentle goodbye, that are ideally mathematical fractions such as dagun (half), tigun (third) or chaugun (fourth). Sometimes a fifth stanza called Bhoga is included. Though usually related to philosophical or Bhakti (emotional devotion to a god or goddess) themes, some Dhrupads were composed to praise kings.

Improvisation is of central importance to Hindustani music, and each gharana (school tradition) has developed its own techniques. At its core, it starts with a standard composition (bandish), then expands it in a process called vistar. The improvisation methods have ancient roots, and one of the more common techniques is called Alap, which is followed by the Jor and Jhala. The Alap explores possible tonal combinations among other things, Jor explores speed or tempo (faster), while Jhala explores complex combinations like a fishnet of strokes while keeping the beat patterns. As with Carnatic music, Hindustani music has assimilated various folk tunes. For example, ragas such as Kafi and Jaijaiwanti are based on folk tunes.

==== Persian and Arab influences ====
Hindustani music has had Arab and Persian music influences, including the creation of new ragas and the development of instruments such as the sitar and sarod. The nature of these influences are unclear. Scholars have attempted to study Arabic maqam (also spelled makam) of Arabian peninsula, Turkey and northern Africa, and dastgah of Iran, to discern the nature and extent. Through the colonial era and until the 1960s, the attempt was to theoretically study ragas and maqams and suggested commonalities. Later comparative musicology studies, states Bruno Nettl – a professor of music, have found the similarities between classical Indian music and European music as well, raising the question about the point of similarities and of departures between the different world music systems.

One of the earliest known discussions of Persian maqam and Indian ragas is by the late 16th century scholar Pundarika Vittala. He states that Persian maqams in use in his times had been derived from older Indian ragas (or mela), and he specifically maps over a dozen maqam. For example, Vittala states that the Hijaz maqam was derived from the Asaveri raga, and Jangula was derived from the Bangal. In 1941, Haidar Rizvi questioned this and stated that influence was in the other direction, Middle Eastern maqams were turned into Indian ragas, such as Zangulah maqam becoming Jangla raga. According to John Baily – a professor of ethnomusicology, there is evidence that the traffic of musical ideas were both ways, because Persian records confirm that Indian musicians were a part of the Qajar court in Tehran, an interaction that continued through the 20th century with import of Indian musical instruments in cities such as Herat near Afghanistan-Iran border.

=== Odissi music ===
Odissi music is a distinct type of Classical music of Eastern India. This music is sung during performance of classical Odissi dance.

The traditional ritual music for the service of Lord Jagannatha, Odissi music has a history spanning over two thousand years, authentic sangita-shastras or treatises, unique Ragas & Talas and a distinctive style of rendition.

The various aspects of Odissi music include odissi prabandha, chaupadi, chhānda, champu, chautisa, janāna, mālasri, bhajana, sarimāna, jhulā, kuduka, koili, poi, boli, and more. Presentation dynamics are roughly classified into four: raganga, bhabanga, natyanga and dhrubapadanga. Some great composer-poets of the Odissi tradition are the 12th-century poet Jayadeva, Balarama Dasa, Atibadi Jagannatha Dasa, Dinakrusna Dasa, Kabi Samrata Upendra Bhanja, Banamali Dasa, Kabisurjya Baladeba Ratha, Abhimanyu Samanta Singhara and Kabikalahansa Gopalakrusna Pattanayaka.

== Features ==
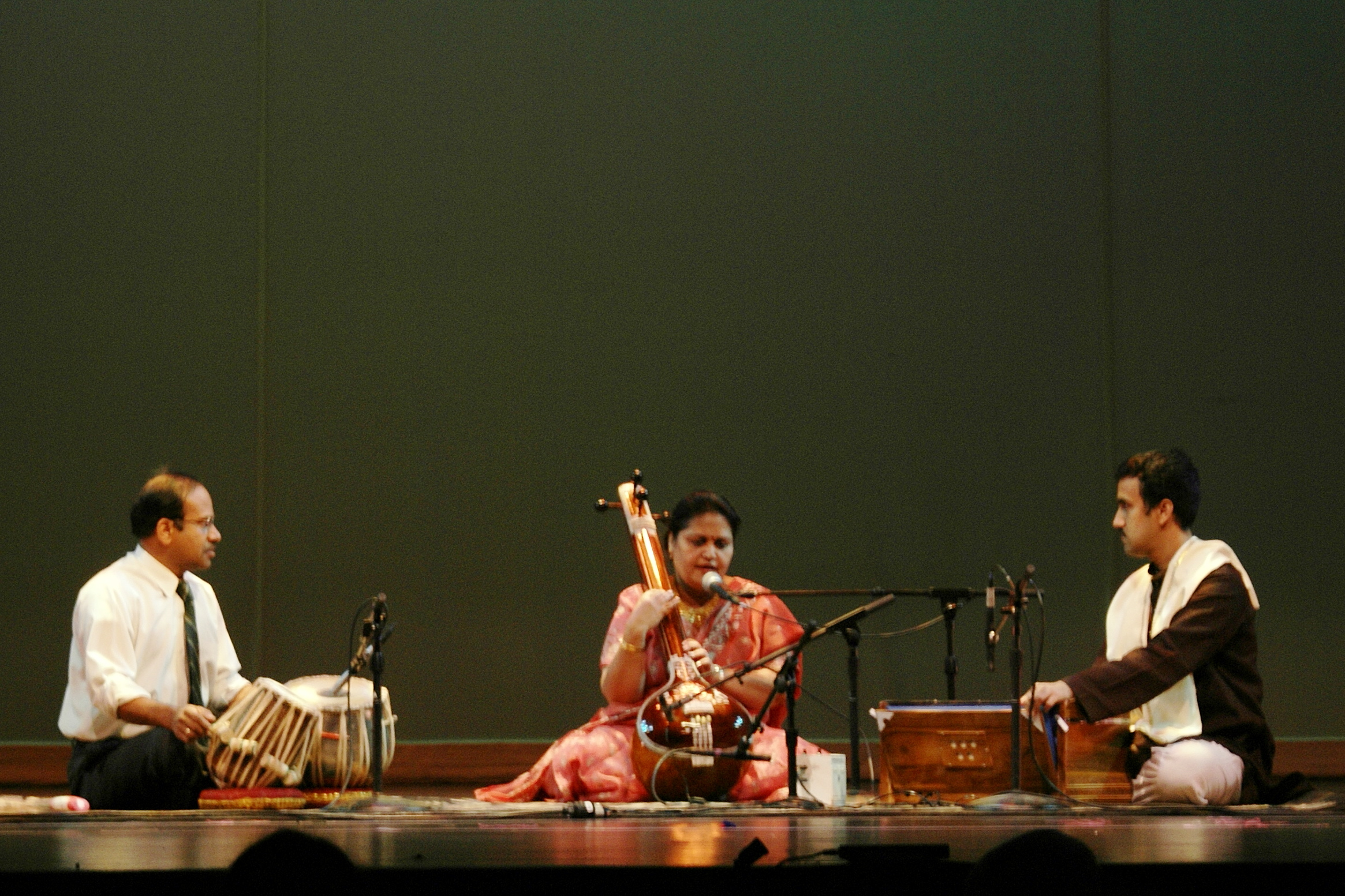
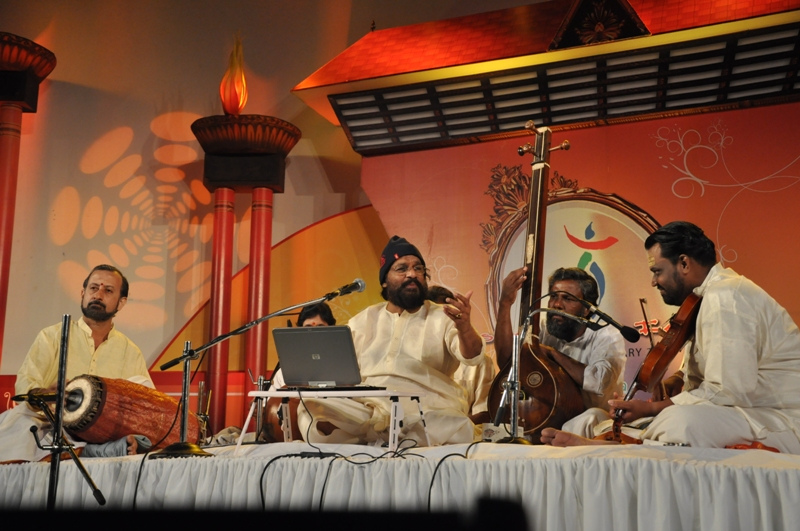
Indian classical music performances

Classical Indian music is one genre of South Asian music; others include film music, various varieties of pop, regional folk, religious and devotional music.

In Indian classical music, the raga and the tala are two foundational elements. The raga forms the fabric of a melodic structure, and the tala keeps the time cycle. Both raga and tala are open frameworks for creativity and allow a very large number of possibilities, however, the tradition considers a few hundred ragas and talas as basic. Raga is intimately related to tala or guidance about "division of time", with each unit called a matra (beat, and duration between beats).

=== Raga ===
A raga is a central concept of Indian music, predominant in its expression. According to Walter Kaufmann, though a remarkable and prominent feature of Indian music, a definition of raga cannot be offered in one or two sentences. Raga may be roughly described as a musical entity that includes note intonation, relative duration and order, in a manner similar to how words flexibly form phrases to create an atmosphere of expression. In some cases, certain rules are considered obligatory, in others optional. The raga allows flexibility, where the artist may rely on simple expression, or may add ornamentations yet express the same essential message but evoke a different intensity of mood.

A raga has a given set of notes, on a scale, ordered in melodies with musical motifs. A musician playing a raga, states Bruno Nettl, may traditionally use just these notes, but is free to emphasize or improvise certain degrees of the scale. The Indian tradition suggests a certain sequencing of how the musician moves from note to note for each raga, in order for the performance to create a rasa (mood, atmosphere, essence, inner feeling) that is unique to each raga. A raga can be written on a scale. Theoretically, thousands of raga are possible given 5 or more notes, but in practical use, the classical Indian tradition has refined and typically relies on several hundred. For most artists, their basic perfected repertoire has some forty to fifty ragas. Raga in Indian classical music is intimately related to tala or guidance about "division of time", with each unit called a matra (beat, and duration between beats).

A raga is not a tune, because the same raga can yield a very large number of tunes. A raga is not a scale, because many ragas can be based on the same scale. A raga, states Bruno Nettl and other music scholars, is a concept similar to mode, something between the domains of tune and scale, and it is best conceptualized as a "unique array of melodic features, mapped to and organized for a unique aesthetic sentiment in the listener". The goal of a raga and its artist is to create rasa (essence, feeling, atmosphere) with music, as classical Indian dance does with performance arts. In the Indian tradition, classical dances are performed with music set to various ragas.

=== Tala ===
According to David Nelson – an Ethnomusicology scholar specializing in Carnatic music, a tala in Indian music covers "the whole subject of musical meter". Indian music is composed and performed in a metrical framework, a structure of beats that is a tala. A tala measures musical time in Indian music. However, it does not imply a regular repeating accent pattern, instead its hierarchical arrangement depends on how the musical piece is supposed to be performed.

The tala forms the metrical structure that repeats, in a cyclical harmony, from the start to end of any particular song or dance segment, making it conceptually analogous to meters in Western music. However, talas have certain qualitative features that classical European musical meters do not. For example, some talas are much longer than any classical Western meter, such as a framework based on 29 beats whose cycle takes about 45 seconds to complete when performed. Another sophistication in talas is the lack of "strong, weak" beat composition typical of the traditional European meter. In classical Indian traditions, the tala is not restricted to permutations of strong and weak beats, but its flexibility permits the accent of a beat to be decided by the shape of musical phrase.

The most widely used tala in the South Indian system is adi tala. In the North Indian system, the most common tala is teental. In the two major systems of classical Indian music, the first count of any tala is called sam.

=== Instruments ===
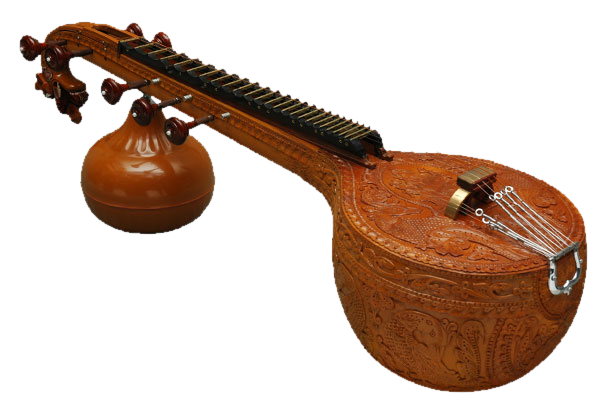
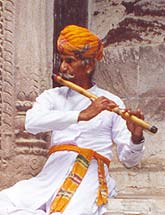
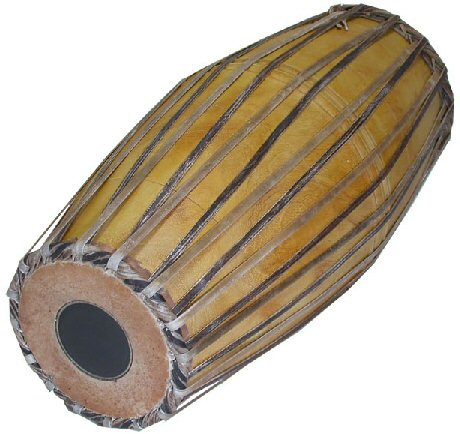
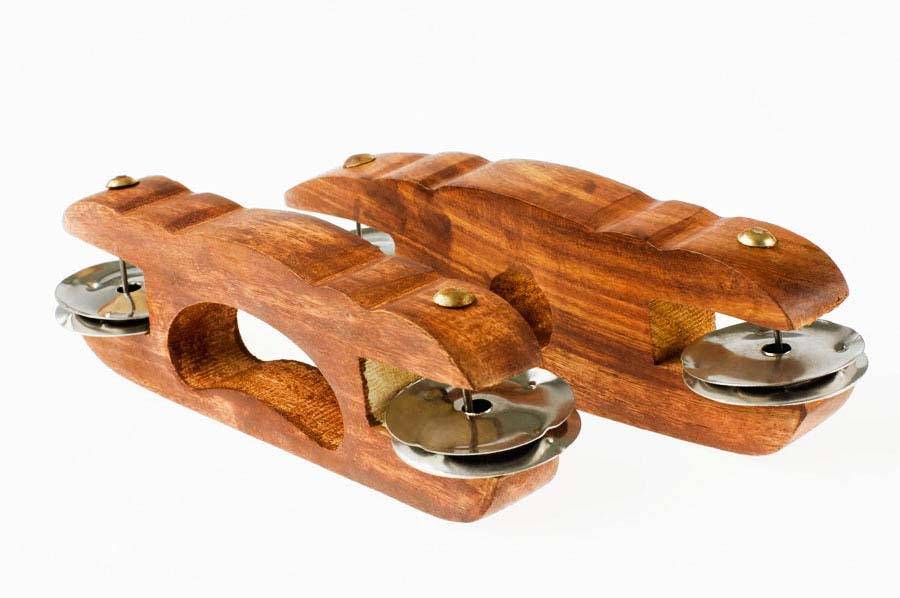
Musical instrument types mentioned in the Natyashastra.

Instruments typically used in Hindustani music include the sitar, sarod, surbahar, esraj, veena, tanpura, bansuri, shehnai, sarangi, violin, santoor, pakhavaj and tabla. Instruments typically used in Carnatic music include veena, venu, gottuvadyam, harmonium, mridangam, kanjira, ghatam, nadaswaram and violin.

Players of the tabla, a type of drum, usually keep the rhythm, an indicator of time in Hindustani music. Another common instrument is the stringed tanpura, which is played at a steady tone (a drone) throughout the performance of the raga, and which provides both a point of reference for the musician and a background against which the music stands out. The tuning of the tanpura depends on the raga being performed. The task of playing the tanpura traditionally falls to a student of the soloist. Other instruments for accompaniment include the sarangi and the harmonium.

=== Note system ===
Indian classical music is both elaborate and expressive. Like Western classical music, it divides the octave into 12 semitones of which the 7 basic notes are, in ascending tonal order, Sa Re Ga Ma Pa Dha Ni for Hindustani music and Sa Ri Ga Ma Pa Dha Ni for Carnatic music, similar to Western music's Do Re Mi Fa So La Ti. However, Indian music uses just-intonation tuning, unlike some modern Western classical music, which uses the equal-temperament tuning system. Also, unlike modern Western classical music, Indian classical music places great emphasis on improvisation.

The underlying scale may have four, five, six or seven tones, called swaras (sometimes spelled as svaras). The swara concept is found in the ancient Natya Shastra in Chapter 28. It calls the unit of tonal measurement or audible unit as Śhruti, with verse 28.21 introducing the musical scale as follows,

तत्र स्वराः –
षड्‍जश्‍च ऋषभश्‍चैव गान्धारो मध्यमस्तथा ।
पञ्‍चमो धैवतश्‍चैव सप्तमोऽथ निषादवान् ॥ २१॥

— Natya Shastra, 28.21

These seven degrees are shared by both major raga systems, that is the North Indian (Hindustani) and South Indian (Carnatic) systems. The solfege (sargam) is learnt in abbreviated form: sa, ri (Carnatic) or re (Hindustani), ga, ma, pa, dha, ni, sa. Of these, the first that is "sa", and the fifth that is "pa", are considered anchors that are unalterable, while the remaining have flavors that differs between the two major systems.

Contemporary Indian music schools follow notations and classifications (see melakarta and thaat). Thaat, used in Hindustani, is generally based on a flawed but still useful notation system created by Vishnu Narayan Bhatkhande.

== Reception outside India ==
According to Yukteshwar Kumar, elements of Indian music arrived in China in the 3rd century, such as in the works of Chinese lyricist Li Yannian. Sustained Western exposure to Hindustani classical music began in 1955, when the sarod player Ali Akbar Khan travelled to the United States at the invitation of the violinist Yehudi Menuhin. On 18 April 1955 Khan recorded Music of India: Morning and Evening Ragas at a Museum of Modern Art guest house in New York, and performed at the museum the following day; the resulting Angel Records release is generally described as the first album of Indian classical music issued in the West. During the same visit he appeared on the CBS arts programme Omnibus, the first appearance on United States television by an Indian classical musician. The critic Ken Hunt described the visit as comprising three historical firsts: the album, the broadcast, and Khan's New York and Washington, D.C. recitals as the concert debut of the tradition in North America. Menuhin described Khan as "an absolute genius, the greatest musician in the world". Ravi Shankar, a disciple of Khan's father Allauddin Khan of the Maihar gharana and later his son-in-law, began touring Europe and the United States in 1956 and recorded his first album, Three Ragas, in London the same year. By 1967 Shankar and other artists were performing at rock music festivals alongside Western rock, blues, and soul acts, a period that lasted until the mid-1970s. Shankar performed at Woodstock in 1969. In August 1971 Khan and Shankar performed together at the Concert for Bangladesh, held at Madison Square Garden in New York, opening each of the two shows with an Indian classical set alongside the tabla player Alla Rakha and Kamala Chakravarty on tanpura. In the 1980s, 1990s and particularly the 2000s onwards, Indian Classical Music has seen rapid growth in reception and development around the globe, particularly in North America, where immigrant communities have preserved and passed on classical music traditions to subsequent generations through the establishment of local festivals and music schools. Numerous musicians of American origin, including Ramakrishnan Murthy, Sandeep Narayan, Pandit Vikash Maharaj, Abby V, and Mahesh Kale have taken professionally to Indian Classical Music with great success. In his 2020 released video, Canadian singer Abby V demonstrated 73 different Indian Classical ragas in a live rendering, which went viral on the internet; further establishing the growing prominence of Indian Classical Music around the globe. Since 2023, the UK-based arts organisation KalaSudha has presented the Kala Festival, a touring celebration of Indian classical music across major British cities, featuring leading Hindustani and Carnatic musicians.

== Organizations ==
Sangeet Natak Akademi, is an Indian national-level academy for performance arts. It awards the Sangeet Natak Akademi Award, the highest Indian recognition given to people in the field of performance arts.

SPIC MACAY, established in 1977, has more than 500 chapters in India and abroad. It claims to hold around 5000 events every year related to Indian classical music and dance. Organizations like Prayag Sangeet Samiti, among others, award certification and courses in Indian classical music.

Akhil Bharatiya Gandharva Mahavidyalaya Mandal (अखिल भारतीय गान्धर्व महाविद्यालय मंडल) is an institution for the promotion and propagation of Indian classical music and dance.

== See also ==
- List of Indian classical music festivals
- List of rāgas in Indian classical music
- List of composers who created ragas
