= Udaka vadya =

Udaka Vadya is an Indian musical instrument. It is assumed either this musical instruments was jal tarang or similar to it. This percussion instrument was categorized in medieval musical treatises under Ghana vadya (idiophonic instruments where the sound is produced by striking a surface). This instrument has been mentioned in Vatsyayana's Kama Sutra, as well as the Sangeeta Parijata of the 17th century. The skill to play this instrument was one of the essential 64 kala, or performing arts, to be learnt by a shishya (student) at gurukul.
