= Kokilapriya =

Ragam in Carnatic music

- Arohanam: S R₁ G₂ M₁ P D₂ N₃ Ṡ
- Avarohanam: Ṡ N₃ D₂ P M₁ G₂ R₁ S
- Equivalent: Neapolitan major scale

Kokilapriya (The one dear to the koel) is a ragam in Carnatic music (musical scale of South Indian classical music). It is the 11th Melakarta rāgam in the 72 melakarta rāgam system of Carnatic music. The 11th rāgam in the Muthuswami Dikshitar school of Carnatic music is called Kokilāravam.

== Structure and Lakshana ==
Kokilapriya scale with shadjam at C

It is the 5th rāgam in the 2nd chakra Netra. The mnemonic name is Netra-Ma. The mnemonic phrase is sa ra gi ma pa dha na. Its ārohaṇa-avarohaṇa structure (ascending and descending scale) is as follows (see swaras in Carnatic music for details on below notation and terms):

- ārohaṇa: S R₁ G₂ M₁ P D₂ N₃ Ṡ (Note: Alternate notations: Hindustani: S Ṟ G̱ M P D N Ṡ; Western: C D♭ E♭ F G A B C)
- avarohaṇa: Ṡ N₃ D₂ P M₁ G₂ R₁ S (Note: Alternate notations: Hindustani: Ṡ N D P M G̱ Ṟ S; Western: C B A G F E♭ D♭ C)

(This scale uses the notes shuddha rishabham, sadharana gandharam, shuddha madhyamam, chathusruthi dhaivatham, kakali nishadham)

As it is a melakarta rāgam, by definition it is a sampoorna rāgam (has all seven notes in ascending and descending scale). It is the shuddha madhyamam equivalent of Suvarnangi, which is the 47th melakarta.

== Asampurna Melakarta ==
Kokilāravam is the 11th Melakarta in the original list compiled by Venkatamakhin. The notes used in the scale are the same, but the scales are vakra (zig-zag in phrases of the scale). It is an shadava-sampurna raga (6 notes in ascending scale, while full 7 are used in descending scale).

- ārohaṇa: S R₁ M₁ M₁ P M₁ P D₂ N₃ Ṡ (Note: Alternate notations: Hindustani: S Ṟ M M P M P D N Ṡ; Western: C D♭ F F G F G A B C)
- avarohaṇa: Ṡ N₃ D₂ D₂ P M₁ G₂ R₁ S (Note: Alternate notations: Hindustani: Ṡ N D D P M G̱ Ṟ S; Western: C B A A G F E♭ D♭ C)
