= Sangita =

Traditional Indian music and associated performance arts

Sangita (Devanagari: संगीत, IAST: saṃgīta), also spelled Samgita or Sangeeta, refers to "music and associated performance arts" in the Indian traditions. According to Guy Beck, the root "saṃ-" implies "combining, coming together, convergent wholesome blending, unison" in the context of musical arts. Sangita connotes any form of singing with music, harmonious recitation or chorus singing in particular. In some medieval era literary genre such as the Puranas and poetic texts such as Kathasaritsagar, a related term Sangita-shastra and Sangita-vidya mean the "art, science or knowledge of singing and dancing with music". According to Alison Arnold and Bruno Nettl, the modern term music fails to capture the historic sense of "Sanskrit sangita and Greek mousike". In the Indian tradition, the term sangita includes melodious singing, rhythmic dancing, instrumental music, classical, provincial, ritual chanting and incidental forms of music-related performance arts.

Sound

Nada (intelligible sound) is
the treasure of happiness for the happy,
the distraction of those who suffer,
the winner of the hearts of the hearers,
the first messenger of the god of love...
the fifth approach to the eternal wisdom, the Veda.

—Sangita Bhasya, A text on music
Translator: Roshen Dalal

Sangita is broadly categorized as consisting of three interrelated knowledges: gīta (vocal music, song), vadya (instrumental music), and nrtya (dance, movement). These ideas appear in the Vedic literature of Hinduism such as in the Aitareya Brahmana, and in early post-Vedic era Sanskrit texts such as the Natya Shastra, Panchatantra, Malvikagnimitra and Kathasaritsagara. A stringed instrument is described with proportional lengths in Jaiminiya Brahmana and Aitareya Aranyaka, and these are compared to poetical meters. It is referred to as "Gandharva Sangita" in the ancient Hindu texts, whose leader is mentioned to be the Vedic sage Narada – the author of seven hymns of the Rigveda. The Hindu goddess Saraswati in revered in these texts as the source and patron of sangita.

Some important Sanskrit manuscripts relating to Sangita include Sangita Ratnakara, Sangita Ratnavali, Sangita Ratnamala, Sangita Darpana, Sangita Siromani and Sangita Sagara. One of the earliest known Sangita treatise is Sangita Meru, authored by Kohala – the student of Bharata Muni of Natya Shastra fame. The text is lost to history, but its existence is known because it has been quoted and cited in other Indian texts.

The 13th-century Sangita Ratnakara text has been influential to North and South Indian music traditions, and is available in many languages. It states, according to Tarla Mehta, that "Sangita constitutes song, dance and musical instruments". The fusion of experience and concept, states Mehta, established Sangita as an integral component of play production in the Indian tradition.

Other known Sangita-related Hindu texts include, with exceptions as noted:

- Ananda Sanjivana
- Anupa Sangita Vilasa
- Hridaya Prakasha
- Rama Kautuhala
- Sangita Chudamani
- Sangita Makaranda
- Sangita Muktavali
- Sangita Parijata
- Sangita Pushpanjali
- Sangita Samayasara (Jain text, Author: Parsvadeva)
- Sangita Sara
- Sangita Vinoda
- Subhodini

The Catalogus Catalogorum published by H. Theodor Aufrecht, and those added by W. Jones, listed 47 Sanskrit treatises on sangita known in the 19th century, along with the author of each Sanskrit text.

== See also ==
- Indian classical music
- List of Indian musical instruments
- Natya shastra
- Tala
