= Tala (music) =

Meter, time cycle measure in Indian music

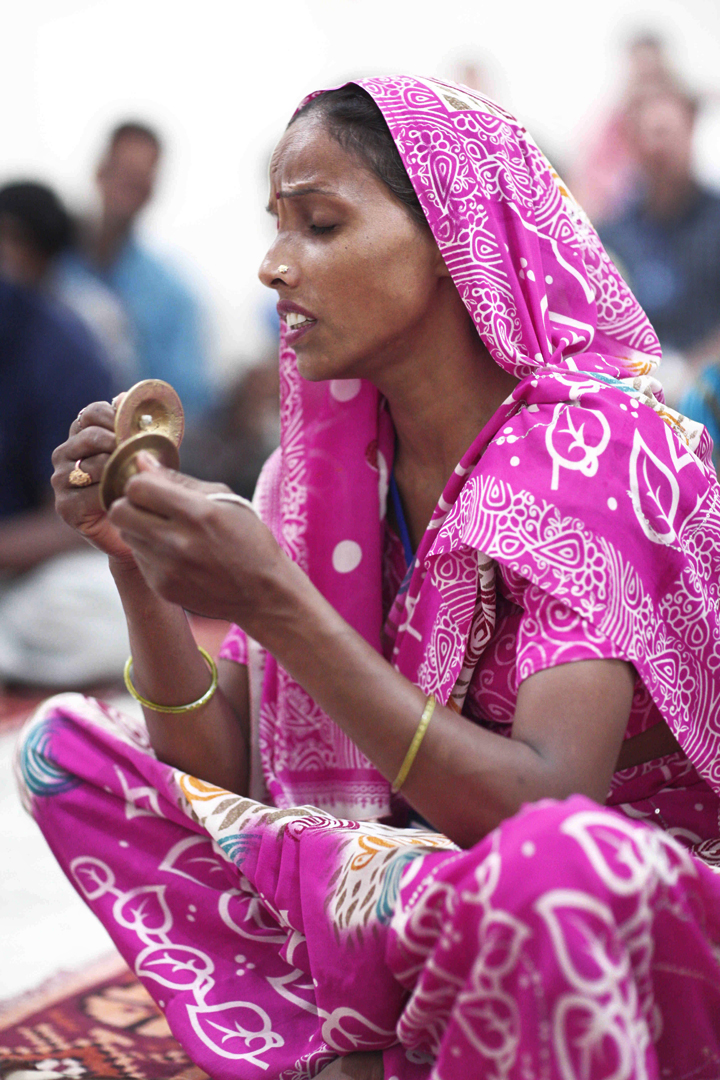
Tala refers to musical meter in classical Indian music. Above: a musician using small cymbals to set the tala.

A tala (IAST tāla) literally means a 'clap, tapping one's hand on one's arm, a musical measure'. It is the term used in Indian classical music similar to musical meter, that is any rhythmic beat or strike that measures musical time. The measure is typically established by hand clapping, waving, touching fingers on thigh or the other hand, verbally, striking of small cymbals, or a percussion instrument in the Indian subcontinental traditions. Along with raga which forms the fabric of a melodic structure, the tala forms the life cycle and thereby constitutes one of the two foundational elements of Indian music.

Tala is an ancient music concept traceable to Vedic era texts of Hinduism, such as the Samaveda and methods for singing the Vedic hymns. The music traditions of the North and South India, particularly the raga and tala systems, were not considered as distinct until about the 16th century. There on, during the tumultuous period of Islamic rule of the Indian subcontinent, the traditions separated and evolved into distinct forms. The tala system of the north is called Hindustaani, while the south is called Carnaatic. However, the tala system between them continues to have more common features than differences.

Tala in the Indian tradition embraces the time dimension of music, the means by which musical rhythm and form were guided and expressed. While a tala carries the musical meter, it does not necessarily imply a regularly recurring drum pattern. In the major classical Indian music traditions, the beats are hierarchically arranged based on how the music piece is to be performed. The most widely used tala in the South Indian system is Adi tala. In the North Indian system, the most common tala is teental.

Tala has other contextual meanings in ancient Sanskrit texts of Hinduism. For example, it means trochee in Sanskrit prosody.

== Etymology ==
Tāla (ताल) is a Sanskrit word, which means 'being established'.

== Terminology and definitions ==
According to David Nelson, an ethnomusicology scholar specializing in Carnatic music, a tala in Indian music covers "the whole subject of musical meter". Indian music is composed and performed in a metrical framework, a structure of beats that is a tala. The tala forms the metrical structure that repeats, in a cyclical harmony, from the start to end of any particular song or dance segment, making it conceptually analogous to meters in Western music. However, talas have certain qualitative features that classical European musical meters do not. For example, some talas are much longer than any classical Western meter, such as a framework based on 29 beats whose cycle takes about 45 seconds to complete when performed. Another sophistication in talas is the lack of "strong, weak" beat composition typical of the traditional European meter. In classical Indian traditions, the tala is not restricted to permutations of strong and weak beats, but its flexibility permits the accent of a beat to be decided by the shape of musical phrase.

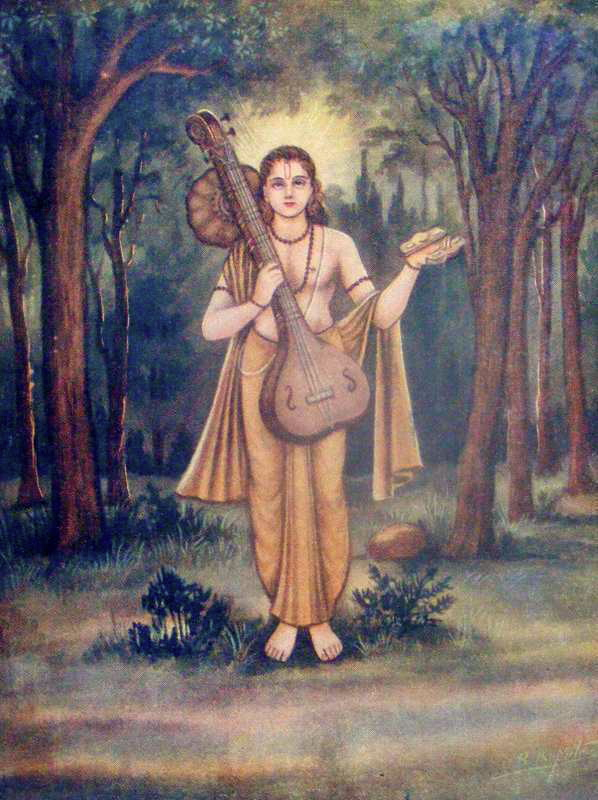
Painting depicting the Vedic sage-musician Narada, with a tala instrument in his left hand

A tala measures musical time in Indian music. However, it does not imply a regular repeating accent pattern, instead its hierarchical arrangement depends on how the musical piece is supposed to be performed. A metric cycle of a tala contains a specific number of beats, which can be as short as 3 beats or as long as 128 beats. The pattern repeats, but the play of accent and empty beats are an integral part of Indian music architecture. Each tala has subunits. In other words, the larger cyclic tala pattern has embedded smaller cyclic patterns, and both of these rhythmic patterns provide the musician and the audience to experience the play of aligned and displaced rhythms on two levels of time division. A musician can choose to intentionally challenge a pattern at the subunit level by contradicting the tala, explore the pattern in exciting ways, then bring the music and audience experience back to the fundamental pattern of cyclical beats.

The tala as the time cycle, and the raga as the melodic framework, are the two foundational elements of classical Indian music. The raga gives an artist the ingredients palette to build the melody from sounds, while the tala provides them with a creative framework for rhythmic improvisation using time.

The basic rhythmic phrase of a North Indian tala when rendered on a percussive instrument such as tabla is called a theka. The beats within each rhythmic cycle are called matras, and the first beat of any rhythmic cycle is called the sam. An empty beat is called khali. The subdivisions of a tala are called vibhagas or khands. In the two major systems of classical Indian music, the first count of any tala is called sam. The cyclic nature of a tala is a major feature of the Indian tradition, and this is termed as avartan. Both raga and tala are open frameworks for creativity and allow a theoretically infinite number of possibilities, however, the tradition considers 108 talas as basic.

== History ==
The roots of tala and music in ancient India are found in the Vedic literature of Hinduism. The earliest Indian thought combined three arts, instrumental music (vadya), vocal music (gita) and dance (nrtta). As these fields developed, sangita became a distinct genre of art, in a form equivalent to contemporary music. This likely occurred before the time of Yāska (~500 BCE), since he includes these terms in his nirukta studies, one of the six Vedanga of ancient Indian tradition. Some of the ancient texts of Hinduism such as the Samaveda (~1000 BCE) are structured entirely to melodic themes, it is sections of Rigveda set to music.

The Samaveda is organized into two formats. One part is based on the musical meter, another by the aim of the rituals. The text is written with embedded coding, where svaras (octave note) is either shown above or within the text, or the verse is written into parvans (knot or member). These markings identify which units are to be sung in a single breath, each unit based on multiples of one eighth. The hymns of Samaveda contain melodic content, form, rhythm and metric organization. This structure is, however, not unique or limited to Samaveda. The Rigveda embeds the musical meter too, without the kind of elaboration found in the Samaveda. For example, the Gayatri mantra contains three metric lines of exactly eight syllables, with an embedded ternary rhythm.

According to Lewis Rowell, a professor of music specializing in classical Indian music, the need and impulse to develop mathematically precise musical meters in the Vedic era may have been driven by the Indian use of oral tradition for transmitting vast amounts of Vedic literature. Deeply and systematically embedded structure and meters may have enabled the ancient Indians a means to detect and correct any errors of memory or oral transmission from one person or generation to the next. According to Michael Witzel,

The Vedic texts were orally composed and transmitted, without the use of script, in an unbroken line of transmission from teacher to student that was formalized early on. This ensured an impeccable textual transmission superior to the classical texts of other cultures; it is, in fact, something like a tape-recording.... Not just the actual words, but even the long-lost musical (tonal) accent (as in old Greek or in Japanese) has been preserved up to the present.

The Samaveda also included a system of chironomy, or hand signals to set the recital speed. These were mudras (finger and palm postures) and jatis (finger counts of the beat), a system at the foundation of talas. The chants in the Vedic recital text, associated with rituals, are presented to be measured in matras and its multiples in the invariant ratio of 1:2:3. This system is also the basis of every tala.

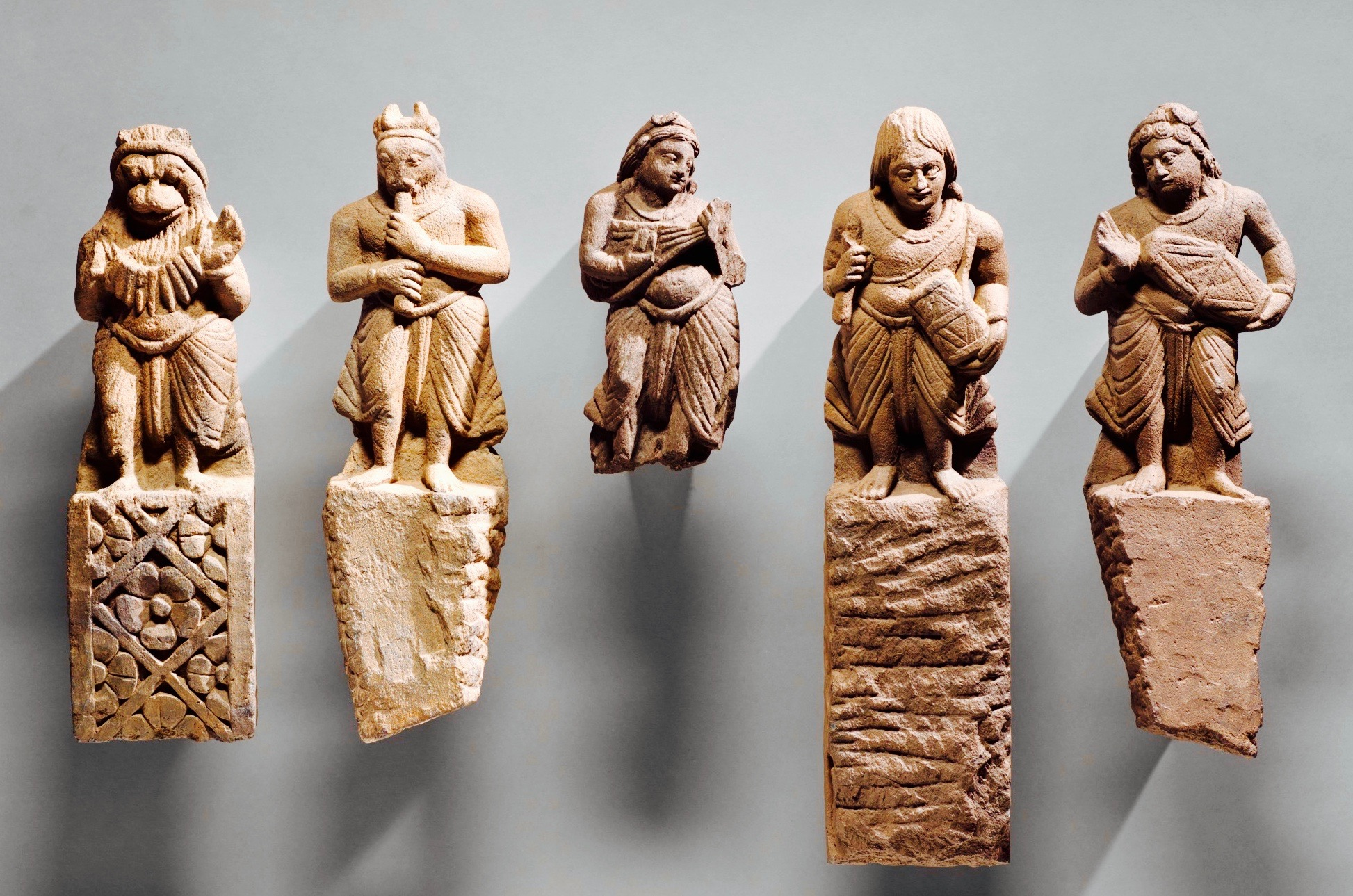
Five Gandharvas (celestial musicians) from 4th–5th century CE, northwest Indian subcontinent, carrying the four types of musical instruments. Gandharvas are discussed in Vedic era literature.

In the ancient traditions of Hinduism, two musical genre appeared, namely Gandharva (formal, composed, ceremonial music) and Gana (informal, improvised, entertainment music). The Gandharva music also implied celestial, divine associations, while the Gana also implied singing. The Vedic Sanskrit musical tradition had spread widely in the Indian subcontinent, and according to Rowell, the ancient Tamil classics make it "abundantly clear that a cultivated musical tradition existed in South India as early as the last few pre-Christian centuries".

The classic Sanskrit text Natya Shastra is at the foundation of the numerous classical music and dance of India. Before Natyashastra was finalized, the ancient Indian traditions had classified musical instruments into four groups based on their acoustic principle (how they work, rather than the material they are made of). These four categories are accepted as given and are four separate chapters in the Natyashastra, one each on stringed instruments (chordophones), hollow instruments (aerophones), solid instruments (idiophones), and covered instruments (membranophones). Of these, states Rowell, the idiophone in the form of "small bronze cymbals" were used for tala. Almost the entire chapter of Natyashastra on idiophones, by Bharata, is a theoretical treatise on the system of tala. Time keeping with idiophones was considered a separate function than that of percussion (membranophones), in the early Indian thought on music theory.

The early 13th century Sanskrit text Sangitaratnakara (literally 'Ocean of Music and Dance'), by Śārṅgadeva patronized by King Sighana of the Yadava dynasty in Maharashtra, mentions and discusses ragas and talas. He identifies seven tala families, then subdivides them into rhythmic ratios, presenting a methodology for improvisation and composition that continues to inspire modern era Indian musicians. Sangitaratnakara is one of the most complete historic medieval era Hindu treatises on this subject that has survived into the modern era, that relates to the structure, technique and reasoning behind ragas and talas.

The centrality and significance of Tala to music in ancient and early medieval India is also expressed in numerous temple reliefs, in both Hinduism and Jainism, such as through the carving of musicians with cymbals at the fifth century Pavaya temple sculpture near Gwalior, and the Ellora Caves.

== Description ==
In the South Indian system (Carnatic), a full tala is a group of seven suladi talas. These are cyclic (avartana), with three parts (anga) traditionally written down with laghu, drutam and anudrutam symbols. Each tala is divided in two ways to perfect the musical performance, one is called kala (kind) and the other gati (pulse).

Each repeated cycle of a tala is called an avartan. This is counted additively in sections (vibhag or anga) which roughly correspond to bars or measures but may not have the same number of beats (matra, akshara) and may be marked by accents or rests. So the Hindustani Jhoomra tal has 14 beats, counted 3+4+3+4, which differs from Dhamar tal, also of 14 beats but counted 5+2+3+4. The spacing of the vibhag accents makes them distinct, otherwise, again, since Rupak tal consists of 7 beats, two cycles of it of would be indistinguishable from one cycle of the related Dhamar tal. However the most common Hindustani tala, Teental, is a regularly-divisible cycle of four measures of four beats each.

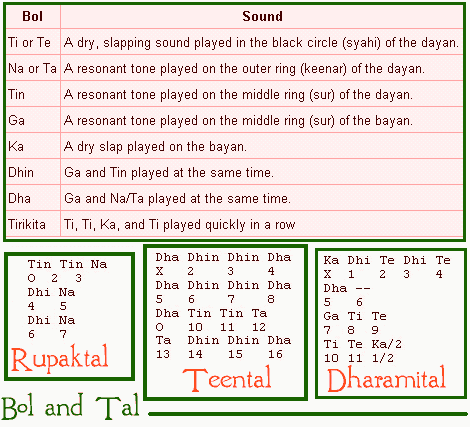
Examples of bol, notation and additive counting in Hindustani classical music

The first beat of any tala, called sam (pronounced as the English word 'sum' and meaning even or equal) is always the most important and heavily emphasised. It is the point of resolution in the rhythm where the percussionist's and soloist's phrases culminate: a soloist has to sound an important note of the raga there, and a North Indian classical dance composition must end there. However, melodies do not always begin on the first beat of the tala but may be offset, for example to suit the words of a composition so that the most accented word falls upon the sam. The term talli, literally 'shift', is used to describe this offset in Tamil. A composition may also start with an anacrusis on one of the last beats of the previous cycle of the tala, called ateeta eduppu in Tamil.

The tāla is indicated visually by using a series of rhythmic hand gestures called kriyas that correspond to the angas or 'limbs', or vibhag of the tāla. These movements define the tala in Carnatic music, and in the Hindustani tradition too, when learning and reciting the tala, the first beat of any vibhag is known as tali ('clap') and is accompanied by a clap of the hands, while an "empty" (khali) vibhag is indicated with a sideways wave of the dominant clapping hand (usually the right) or the placing of the back of the hand upon the base hand's palm instead. But northern definitions of tala rely far more upon specific drum-strokes, known as bols, each with its own name that can be vocalized as well as written. In one common notation the sam is denoted by an 'X' and the khali, which is always the first beat of a particular vibhag, denoted by '0' (zero).

A tala does not have a fixed tempo (laya) and can be played at different speeds. In Hindustani classical music a typical recital of a raga falls into two or three parts categorized by the quickening tempo of the music; Vilambit (delayed, i.e., slow), Madhya (medium tempo) and Drut (fast). Carnatic music adds an extra slow and fast category, categorised by divisions of the pulse; Chauka (one stroke per beat), Vilamba (two strokes per beat), Madhyama (four strokes per beat), Drut (eight strokes per beat) and lastly Adi-drut (16 strokes per beat).

Indian classical music, both northern and southern, have theoretically developed since ancient times numerous tala, though in practice some talas are very common, and some are rare.

== In Carnatic music ==
Carnatic music uses various classification systems of tālas such as the Chapu (four talas), Chanda (108 talas) and Melakarta (72 talas). The Suladi Sapta Tāla system (35 talas) is used here, according to which there are seven families of tāla. A tāla from this system cannot exist without reference to one of five jatis, differentiated by the length in beats of the laghu. Thus, with all the possible combinations of tala types and laghu lengths, there are 5 x 7 = 35 talas having lengths ranging from 3 (Tisra-jati Eka tala) to 29 (sankeerna jati dhruva tala) aksharas. The seven tala families and the number of aksharas for each of the 35 talas are;

Tala	Anga notation (I = N; O = 2; U = 1)	Tisra (N=3)	Chatusra (N=4)	Khanda (N=5)	Misra (N=7)	Sankeerna (N=9)
Dhruva	lOll (N-2-N-N)	11	14	17	23	29
Matya	lOl (N-2-N)	8	10	12	16	20
Rupaka	Ol (2-N)	5	6	7	9	11
Jhampa	lUO (N-1-2)	6	7	8	10	12
Triputa	lOO (N-2-2)	7	8	9	11	13
Ata	llOO (N-N-2-2)	10	12	14	18	22
Eka	l (N)	3	4	5	7	9

In practice, only a few talas have compositions set to them. The most common tala is Chaturasra-nadai Chaturasra-jaati Triputa tala, also called Adi tala (Adi meaning primordial in Sanskrit). Nadai is a term which means subdivision of beats. Many kritis and around half of the varnams are set to this tala. Other common talas include:

- Chaturasra-nadai Chaturasra-jaati Rupaka tala (or simply Rupaka tala). A large body of krtis is set to this tala.
- Khanda Chapu (a 10-count) and Misra Chapu (a 14-count), both of which do not fit very well into the suladi sapta tala scheme. Many padams are set to Misra Chapu, while there are also krtis set to both the above talas.
- Chatusra-nadai Khanda-jati Ata tala (or simply Ata tala). Around half of the varnams are set to this tala.
- Tisra-nadai Chatusra-jati Triputa tala (Adi Tala Tisra-Nadai). A few fast-paced kritis are set to this tala. As this tala is a twenty-four beat cycle, compositions in it can be and sometimes are sung in Rupaka talam.

=== Strokes ===
There are six main angas/strokes in talas;

- Anudhrutam, a single beat, notated 'U', a downward clap of the open hand with the palm facing down.
- Dhrutam, a pattern of two beats, notated 'O', a downward clap with the palm facing down followed by a second downward clap with the palm facing up.
- Laghu, a pattern with a variable number of beats, three, four, five, seven or nine, depending on the jati. It is notated 'l' and consists of a downward clap with the palm facing down followed by counting from little finger to thumb and back, depending on the jati.
- Guru, a pattern represented by eight beats. It is notated '8' and consists of a downward clap with the palm facing down followed by circling movement of the right hand with closed fingers in the clockwise direction.
- Plutham, a pattern of twelve beats notated '3', it consists of a downward clap with the palm facing down followed by counting from little finger to the middle finger, a krishya (waving the hand towards the left hand side four times) and a sarpini (waving the hand towards the right four times)
- Kakapadam, a pattern of sixteen beats notated 'x', it consists of a downward clap with the palm facing down followed by counting from little finger to the middle finger, a pathakam (waving the hand upwards four times), a krishya and a sarpini

=== Jatis ===
Each tala can incorporate one of the five following jatis.

Jati	Number of aksharas
Chaturasra	4
Thisra	3
Khanda	5
Misra	7
Sankeerna	9

Each tala family has a default jati associated with it; the tala name mentioned without qualification refers to the default jati.

- Dhruva tala is by default chaturasra jati
- Matya tala is chaturasra jati
- Rupaka tala is chaturasra jati
- Jhampa tala is misra jati
- Triputa tala is tisra jati (chaturasra jati type is also known as Adi tala)
- Ata tala is kanda jati
- Eka tala is chaturasra jati
- For all the 72 melakarta talas and the 108 talas the jathi is mostly chatusram

For example, one cycle of khanda-jati rupaka tala comprises a two-beat dhrutam followed by a five-beat laghu. The cycle is thus seven aksharas long. Chaturasra nadai khanda-jati Rupaka tala has seven aksharam, each of which is four matras long; each avartana of the tala is 4 x 7 = 28 matras long. For Misra nadai Khanda-jati Rupaka tala, it would be 7 x 7 = 49 matra.

=== Gati (nadai in Tamil, nadaka in Telugu, nade in Kannada) ===
The number of maatras in an akshara is called the nadai. This number can be three, four, five, seven or nine, and take the same name as the jatis. The default nadai is Chatusram:

Jati	Maatras	Phonetic representation of beats
Tisra	3	Tha Ki Ta
Chatusra	4	Tha Ka Dhi Mi
Khanda	5	Tha Ka Tha Ki Ta
Misra	7	Tha Ki Ta Tha Ka Dhi Mi
Sankeerna	9	Tha Ka Dhi Mi Tha Ka Tha Ki Ta

Sometimes, pallavis are sung as part of a Ragam Thanam Pallavi exposition in some of the rarer, more complicated talas; such pallavis, if sung in a non-Chatusra-nadai tala, are called nadai pallavis. In addition, pallavis are often sung in chauka kale (slowing the tala cycle by a magnitude of four times), although this trend seems to be slowing.

=== Kāla ===
Kāla refers to the change of tempo during a rendition of song, typically doubling up the speed. Onnaam kaalam is first speed, Erandaam kaalam is second speed and so on. Erandaam kaalam fits in twice the number of aksharaas (notes) into the same beat, thus doubling the tempo. Sometimes, Kāla is also used similar to Layā, for example Madhyama Kālam or Chowka Kālam.

== In Hindustani music ==
Talas have a vocalised and therefore recordable form wherein individual beats are expressed as phonetic representations of various strokes played upon the tabla. Various Gharanas (literally 'Houses' which can be inferred to be "styles" – basically styles of the same art with cultivated traditional variances) also have their own preferences. For example, the Kirana Gharana uses Ektaal more frequently for Vilambit Khayal while the Jaipur Gharana uses Trital. Players from the Jaipur Gharana are also known to use Ada Trital, a variation of Trital for transitioning from Vilambit to Drut laya.

The khali vibhag has no beats on the bayan, i.e. no bass beats this can be seen as a way to enforce the balance between the usage of heavy (bass dominated) and light (treble) beats or more simply it can be thought of another mnemonic to keep track of the rhythmic cycle (in addition to Sam). The khali is played with a stressed syllable that can easily be picked out from the surrounding beats.

Some rare talas even contain a "half-beat". For example, Dharami is an 11 1/2 beat cycle where the final "Ka" only occupies half the time of the other beats. This tala's sixth beat does not have a played syllable – in western terms it is a rest.

=== Common Hindustani talas ===
Some talas, for example Dhamaar, Ektaal, Jhoomra and Chautala, lend themselves better to slow and medium tempos. Others flourish at faster speeds, like Jhaptal or Rupak talas. Trital or Teental is one of the most popular, since it is as aesthetic at slower tempos as it is at faster speeds. As stated above, the division with the sam (first strong beat) is marked with X, the khali section is marked by 0, and the remaining sections, tali are marked with numbers starting at 2. Some sources give Rupak tala as starting with khali, the only tala to do so.

There are many talas in Hindustani music, some of the more popular ones are:

Name	Beats	Division	Vibhaga
Tintal (or Trital or Teental)	16	4+4+4+4	X 2 0 3
Tilwada	16	4+4+4+4	X 2 0 3
Jhoomra	14	3+4+3+4	X 2 0 3
Ada Chautaal	14		
Dhamar	14	5+2+3+4	X 2 0 3
Deepchandi (thumri, film songs)	14		
Ektal (and Chautal, in Dhrupad)	12	2+2+2+2+2+2	X 0 2 0 3 4
Jhaptal	10	2+3+2+3	X 2 0 3
Sool Taal (mainly Dhrupad)	10		
Keherwa	8	4+4	X 0
Rupak (Mughlai/Roopak) Carnatic has a 6-beat Roopak	7	3+2+2	X 2 3 or 0 X 2
Tevaraa (used in dhrupad)	7		
Dadra	6	3+3	X 0

== 72 melakarta talas and 108 anga talas ==
=== 72 melakarta talas ===
S.No	Name of raga	Pattern of the symbols of angas	Aksharas
1	Kanakaangi	1 Anudhrutha, 1 Dhrutha, 1 Guru, 1 Laghu	15
2	Rathnaangi	1 Guru, 1 Anudhrutha, 1 Laghu, 1 Dhrutha Sekara Viraamam, 1 Laghu	20
3	Ganamurthi	1 Laghu, 2 Anudhruthas, 1 Laghu, 1 Dhrutha Sekara Viraamam, 1 Guru, 1 Anudhrutha	22
4	Vanaspathi	1 Laghu, 2 Anudhruthas, 1 Guru, 1 Anudhrutha, 1 Laghu, 1 Dhrutha Sekara Viraamam	22
5	Maanavathi	1 Laghu, 1 Dhrutha Sekara Viraamam, 1 Anudhrutha, 1 Laghu, 1 Anudhrutha, 1 Laghu, 1 Dhrutha Sekara Viraamam	20
6	Dhanarupi	1 Guru, 1 Anudhrutha, 1 Laghu, 1 Dhritha	15
7	Senaavathi	1 Gurus, 1 Dhrutha Sekara Viraamam, 1 Dhrutha, 1 Laghu, 1 Anudhrutha, 1 Laghu, 1 Dhrutha Sekara Viraamam	25
8	Hanumathodi	1 Guru, 2 Anudhruthas, 1 Laghu, 1 Dhrutha, 1 Pluta, 1 Dhrutha, 1 Laghu	34
9	Dhenuka	1 Pluta, 2 Anudhruthas, 1 Dhrutha	16
10	Natakapriya	3 Dhruthas, 1 Laghu, 1 Dhrutha	12
11	Kokilapriya	1 Guru, 1 Anudhrutha, 1 Dhrutha, 2 Laghus, 1 Dhrutha	21
12	Rupaavathi	1 Laghu, 1 Dhrutha Sekara Viraamam, 1 Laghu, 1 Anudhrutha, 1 Laghu, 1 Dhrutha Sekara Viraamam	19
13	Gayakapriya	1 Laghu, 1 Anudhrutha, 2 Dhruthas, 1 Laghu, 1 Dhrutha	15
14	Vagula bharanam	1 Laghu, 1 Anudhrutha, 2 Dhruthas, 1 Laghu, 1 Anudhrutha, 1 Dhrutha Sekara Viraamam, 1 Guru, 1 Dhrutha Sekara Viraamam	28
15	Maya malava goulam	1 Laghu, 2 Dhrutha Sekara Viraamam, 1 Laghu, 1 Dhrutha Sekara Viraamam, 1 Anudhrutha, 1 Laghu, 1 Anudhrutha, 1 Laghu, 1 Dhrutha Sekara Viraamam, 1 Anudhrutha	31
16	Chakravaham	1 Laghu, 1 Dhrutha Sekara Viraamam, 2 Laghus, 1 Dhrutha, 1 Laghu, 1 Dhrutha Sekara Viraamam	24
17	Suryakantham	1 Guru, 1 Dhrutha Sekara Viraamam, 1 Dhrutha, 1 Guru, 1 Pluta	33
18	Haata kambari	1 Guru, 2 Dhruthas, 1 Guru, 1 Laghu, 1 Dhrutha Sekara Viraamam	27
19	Jankaradh wani	1 Pluta, 3 Dhrutha Sekara Viraamams, 1 Pluta, 1 Dhrutha, 1 Anudhrutha	36
20	Nata bhairavi	1 Anudhrutha, 1 Dhrutha Sekara Viraamam, 1 Laghu, 2 Dhrutha Sekara Viraamams, 1 Laghu, 1 Anudhrutha	19
21	Keeravani	2 Dhrutha Sekara Viraamams, 1 Laghu, 1 Dhrutha, 1 Laghu, 1 Dhrutha	18
22	Karahara priya	2 Dhrutha Sekara Viraamams, 1 Guru, 1 Anudhrutha, 1 Dhrutha Sekara Viraamam, 1 Laghu, 1 Dhrutha	24
23	Gowri manohari	1 Laghu, 1 Dhrutha Sekara Viraamam, 2 Laghus, 1 Dhrutha, 2 Gurus, 1 Anudhrutha, 1 Dhrutha Sekara Viraamam	37
24	Varuna priya	1 Laghu, 1 Anudhrutha, 1 Dhrutha Sekara Viraamam, 1 Laghu, 1 Dhrutha, 1 Laghu, 1 Dhrutha	20
25	Maara ranjani	1 Laghu, 2 Dhrutha Sekara Viraamams, 2 Gurus, 2 Anudhruthas	28
26	Charukesi	1 Guru, 1 Dhrutha Sekara Viraamam, 1 Laghu, 1 Anudhrutha, 1 Laghu, 1 Dhrutha	22
27	Sarasaangi	1 Guru, 1 Dhrutha Sekara Viraamam, 1 Pluta, 1 Dhrutha, 1 Laghu	29
28	Harikamboji	1 Guru, 1 Anudhrutha, 1 Dhrutha Sekara Viraamam, 1 Guru, 1 Pluta, 1 Guru, 1 Anudhrutha	41
29	Dheera sankara bharanam	1 Guru, 2 Dhrutha Sekara Viraamams, 1 Guru, 1 Dhrutha Sekara Viraamam, 1 Dhrutha, 2 Laghus, 1 Anudhrutha, 1 Dhrutha Sekara Viraamam, 1 Guru, 1 Dhrutha Sekara Viraamam	50
30	Nagaa nandhini	1 Dhrutha, 1 Laghu, 1 Anudhrutha, 1 Laghu, 1 Dhrutha, 1 Guru, 2 Anudhruthas	23
31	Yagapriya	1 Dhrutha Sekara Viraamam, 2 Laghus, 1 Dhrutha	13
32	Raga vardhini	3 Laghus, 1 Anudhrutha, 1 Guru, 1 Dhrutha, 1 Anudhrutha	24
33	Gangeya bhushani	1 Guru, 1 Dhrutha, 1 Laghu, 1 Dhrutha Sekara Viraamam, 1 Dhrutha, 1 Laghu, 1 Dhrutha, 1 Laghu, 1 Dhrutha Sekara Viraamam, 1 Laghu, 1 Dhrutha	38
34	Vaga dheeshwari	1 Laghu, 1 Dhrutha, 1 Laghu, 1 Guru, 1 Dhrutha Sekara Viraamam, 1 Guru, Dhrutha, 1 Dhrutha Sekara Viraamam	34
35	Soolini	1 Laghu, 1 Dhrutha Sekara Viraamam, 1 Laghu, 1 Anudhrutha	12
36	Chala Naata	1 Laghu, 1 Dhrutha Sekara Viraamam, 1 Laghu, 2 Dhruthas	15
37	Chalagam	1 Guru, 1 Anudhrutha, 1 Laghu, 1 Guru, 1 Anudhrutha	22
38	Jalaarnavam	1 Guru, 1 Anudhrutha, 1 Laghu, 1 Anudhrutha, 2 Gurus, 1 Dhrutha	32
39	Jaalavarali	1 Guru, 1 Dhrutha Sekara Viraamam, 2 Laghus, 1 Anudhrutha, 1 Laghu, 1 Anudhrutha	25
40	Navaneetham	1 Anudhrutha, 1 Laghu, 1 Anudhrutha, 1 Dhrutha, 1 Laghu, 1 Dhrutha Sekara Viraamam	15
41	Paavani	1 Dhrutha Sekara Viraamam, 1 Laghu, 2 Anudhruthas	9
42	Raghupriya	1 Dhrutha Sekara Viraamam, 1 Laghu, Anudhrutha, 1 Laghu, 1 Dhrutha	14
43	Kavaambothi	1 Laghu, 1 Guru, 1 Dhrutha Sekara Viraamam, 1 Pluta, 1 Guru, 1 Anudhrutha	36
44	Bhavapriya	1 Laghu, 1 Anudhrutha, 1 Laghu, 1 Anudhrutha, 1 Laghu, 1 Dhrutha	16
45	Subha panthuvarali	1 Laghu, 1 Dhrutha, 1 Laghu, 1 Anudhrutha, 1 Laghu, 1 Dhrutha Sekara Viraamam, 1 Laghu, 1 Dhrutha Sekara Viraamam, 1 Laghu, 1 Anudhrutha, 1 Laghu, 1 Anudhrutha	35
46	Shadvitha maargini	1 Guru, 1 Dhrutha, 1 Laghu, 1 Anudhrutha, 1 Guru, 1 Dhrutha, 1 Laghu, 1 Dhrutha Sekara Viraamam, 1 Laghu, 1 Dhrutha, 1 Laghu, 1 Dhrutha	44
47	Swarnaangi	1 Guru, 1 Laghu, 1 Dhrutha, 1 Pluta, 1 Dhrutha, 1 Laghu	32
48	Divyamani	1 Guru, 1 Anudhrutha, 1 Laghu, 1 Dhrutha, 1 Laghu, 1 Dhrutha, 1 Laghu, 1 Dhrutha	27
49	Davalaambari	1 Guru, 1 Anudhrutha, 1 Laghu, 1 Anudhrutha, 1 Laghu, 1Dhrutha Sekara Viraamam, 1 Laghu, 1 Dhrutha Sekara Viraamam	28
50	Naama narayani	1 Dhrutha, 1 Laghu, 2 Dhruthas, 1 Laghu, 1 Dhrutha, 1 Laghu, 1 Dhrutha	22
51	Kaamavartha	1 Dhrutha Sekara Viraamam, 1 Laghu, 1 Dhrutha, 1 Laghu, 1 Anudhrutha, 1 Pluta, 1 Anudhrutha	27
52	Raamapriya	2 Laghus, 1 Dhrutha, 1 Laghu, 1 Dhrutha	16
53	Gamanashrama	2 Laghus, 1 Dhrutha, 1 Anudhrutha, 1 Laghu, 1 Dhrutha	17
54	Viswambari	1 Laghu, 1 Anudhrutha, 1 Pluta, 1 Dhrutha Sekara Viraamam, 1 Laghu, 1 Dhrutha Sekara Viraamam	27
55	Syamalangi	1 Guru, 1 Laghu, 1 Dhrutha, 1 Laghu, 1 Dhrutha Sekara Viraamam, 1 Laghu	25
56	Shanmukha priya	1 Pluta, 1 Laghu, 1 Dhrutha, 1Dhrutha Sekara Viraamam, 1 Laghu, 1 Dhrutha	27
57	Simhendra madhyamam	1 Guru, 1 Kakapada, 1 Laghu, 1 Dhrutha, 1 Guru, 1 Dhrutha Sekara Viraamam, 1 Laghu, 1 Dhrutha, 1 Guru, 1 Dhrutha Sekara Viraamam, 1 Guru, 1 Dhrutha Sekara Viraamam	69
58	Hemaavathi	1 Pluta, 1 Laghu, 1 Dhrutha, 1 Laghu, 1 Anudhrutha, 1 Laghu, 1 Dhrutha Sekara Viraamam	30
59	Dharmavathi	1 Pluta, 1 Laghu, 1 Dhrutha, 1 Laghu, 1 Anudhrutha, 1 Laghu, 1 Dhrutha Sekara Viraamam	30
60	Neethimathi	1Dhrutha, 1Laghu, 1Dhrutha Sekara Viraamam, 1 Laghu, 1 Dhrutha, 1 Laghu, 1 Dhrutha Sekara Viraamam	22
61	Kaanthamani	2 Gurus, 1 Laghu, 1 Dhrutha, 1 Laghu, 1 Dhrutha	28
62	Rishabhapriya	1 Dhrutha Sekara Viraamam, 1 Laghu, 1 Dhrutha Sekara Viraamam, 1 Laghu, 1 Anudhrutha, 1 Laghu, 1 Dhrutha	21
63	Lathaangi	1 Laghu, 1 Pluta, 1 Anudhrutha, 1 Laghu	21
64	Vachaspathi	1 Laghu, 1 Dhrutha, 1 Laghu, 1 Dhrutha Sekara Viraamam, 1 Guru, 1 Anudhrutha, 1 Laghu, 1 Dhrutha Sekara Viraamam	29
65	Mecha Kalyani	1 Guru, 1 Anudhrutha, 1 Laghu, 1 Dhrutha Sekara Viraamam, 1 Dhrutha, 1 Laghu, 1 Dhrutha, 1 Laghu, 1 Dhrutha	30
66	Chithraambari	1 Laghu, 1 Dhrutha Sekara Viraamam, 1 Pluta, 1 Dhrutha Sekara Viraamam, 1 Laghu, 1 Dhrutha Sekara Viraamam	29
67	Sucharithra	1 Guru, 1 Laghu, 2 Dhrutha Sekara Viraamams, 1 Guru, 1 Anudhrutha	27
68	Jyothi swarupini	1 Kakapada, 1 Anudhrutha, 1 Laghu, 1 Dhrutha Sekara Viraamam, 1 Pluta, 1 Laghu, 1 Dhrutha, 1 Laghu, 1 Dhrutha	48
69	Dathuvardhani	1 Guru, 1 Dhrutha Sekara Viraamam, 1 Laghu, 1 Dhrutha Sekara Viraamam, 1 Laghu, 1 Anudhrutha, 1 Pluta, 1 Anudhrutha	36
70	Naasikha bhushani	1 Dhrutha, 1 Guru, 1 Dhrutha Sekara Viraamam, 1 Laghu, 1 Dhrutha, 1 Laghu, 1 Dhrutha Sekara Viraamam, 1 Laghu, 1 Dhrutha	32
71	Kosalam	1 Guru, 1 Anudhrutha, 2 Gurus, 1 Anudhruthas	26
72	Rasikapriya	1 Dhrutha Sekara Viraamam, 1 Guru, 1 Dhrutha Sekara Viraamam, 1 Laghu, 1 Dhrutha	20

=== 7 Saptangachakram (7 angas) ===
Anga	Symbol	Aksharakala
Anudrutam	U	1
Druta	O	2
Druta-virama	UO	3
Laghu (Chatusra-jati)	l	4
Guru	8	8
Plutam	3	12
Kakapadam	x	16

=== Shodashangachakram (16 angas) ===
Anga	Symbol	Aksharakala
Anudrutam	U	1
Druta	O	2
Druta-virama	UO	3
Laghu (Chatusra-jati)	l	4
Laghu-virama	Ul	5
Laghu-druta	Ol	6
Laghu-druta-virama	UOl	7
Guru	8	8
Guru-virama	U8	9
Guru-druta	O8	10
Guru-druta-virama	UO8	11
Plutam	3	12
Pluta-virana	U3	13
Pluta-druta	O3	14
Pluta-druta-virama	UO3	15
Kakapadam	x	16

Compositions are rare in the 108 lengthy anga talas. They are mostly used in performing the Pallavi of Ragam Thanam Pallavis. Some examples of anga talas are:

Sarabhanandana tala

8		O	l	l	O	U	U)
O	O	O	U	O)	OU)	U)	O
U	O	U	O	U)	O	(OU)	O)

Simhanandana tala : It is the longest tala.

8	8	l	)	l	8	O	O
8	8	l	)	l	)	8	l
l	x						

Another type of tala is the chhanda tala. These are talas set to the lyrics of the Thirupugazh by the Tamil composer Arunagirinathar. He is said to have written 16,000 hymns each in a different chhanda tala. Of these, only 1500–2000 are available.

== Rarer Hindustani talas ==
Name	Beats	Division	Vibhaga
Adachoutal	14	2+2+2+2+2+2+2	X 2 0 3 0 4 0
Brahmtal	28	2+2+2+2+2+2+2+2+2+2+2+2+2+2	X 0 2 3 0 4 5 6 0 7 8 9 10 0
Dipchandi	14	3+4+3+4	X 2 0 3
Shikar	17	6+6+2+3	X 0 3 4
Sultal	10	2+2+2+2+2	x 0 2 3 0
Ussole e Fakhta	5	1+1+1+1+1	x 3
Farodast	14	3+4+3+4	X 2 0 3
