= Drut =

Hindustani music term

Drut (द्रुत; also called drut laya) is the concluding section, in fast tempo (or laya), between 160 and 320 beats per minute, of the performance of a vocal raga in Hindustani classical music.

== See also ==
- Khyal
- Vilambit
- Madhyalaya
- Hindustani classical music
