= Vilambit =

Vilambit (Hindi: विलंबित; also called vilambit laya) is an introductory slow tempo, or laya, between 10 and 40 beats per minute, used in the performance of a raga in Hindustani classical music.

For major ragas, the vilambit portion generally takes up two-thirds or more of the performance, and is followed by a short drut to conclude the performance. Vocalists use a slower definition of time than instrumentalists (Gottlieb 1977a:41). Vilambit is a part of 3 different kinds of Layas, (Laya Vilambit, Laya Madhyam, and Laya Drut) all of them have different speeds and can be referred to later on.

== See also ==
- Khyal
- Madhyalaya
