= Kamalini Mukherji discography =

Kamalini Mukherji (Bengali: কমলিনী মুখোপাধ্যায়; born 17 October 1979) is an Indian vocalist who performs Bengali music, specifically, Rabindra Sangeet. Mukherji has released 12 music albums with Saregama, one of the leading music labels in India.

== Dakshinee Purashkar Bijoyee-Shilpi (2003) ==
This album is a compilation of 18 songs by Dakshinee Purashkar awardees. This award is given by Dakshinee, a leading academy in Kolkata promoting Rabindra Sangeet, each year to exceptionally promising students of Rabindra Sangeet, across multiple reputed institutions that teach the art form.

Dakshinee Purashkar Bijoyee-Shilpi

Studio album by Kamalini Mukherji and other artists
- Released: 2003
- Genre: Rabindra Sangeet, World Music
- Length: 8:36 (Mukherji's tracks)
- Label: Saregama

All tracks are written by Rabindranath Tagore

No.	Title	Raga / Tala	Length
2.	"Ami Ki Gaan Gabo Je (আমি কী গান গাব যে)" (Prakriti (Nature) 120)	Desh-Malhar / Dadra	2:41
8.	"Baro Bedonar Mato (বড়ো বেদনার মতো)" (Prem (Love) 57)	Kalingada / Ektal	3:26
12.	"Nishidin Mor Parane (নিশিদিন মোর পরানে)" (Puja (Devotional) 421)	Asavari / Trital	2:29

== Geetosudhar Tore (2006) ==
This is Mukherji's first individual Rabindra Sangeet album.

Geetosudhar Tore

Studio album by Kamalini Mukherji
- Released: 2006
- Genre: Rabindra Sangeet, World Music
- Length: 47:50
- Label: P&M Records

All tracks are written by Rabindranath Tagore

No.	Title	Raga / Tala	Length
1.	"Jaage Nath Jochhonaraate (জাগে নাথ জোছনারাতে)" (Puja (Devotional) 536)	Bihag / Dhamar	4:57
2.	"Tumi Hothat-Haoway (তুমি হঠাৎ-হাওয়ায়)" (Puja (Devotional) 571)	Khamaj-Baul / Dadra	2:57
3.	"Jodi E Amar Hridayduar (যদি এ আমার হৃদয়দুয়ার)" (Puja (Devotional) 102)	Kafi / Jhaptal	6:08
4.	"Ami Bahu Basanay Pranpane Chai (আমি বহু বাসনায় প্রাণপণে চাই)" (Puja (Devotional) 225)	Chhayanat / Ektal	3:22
5.	"E Ki Koruna, Korunamoy (একি করুণা করুণাময়)" (Puja (Devotional) 461)	Bahar / Addha Theka	5:32
6.	"Je Chhayare Dhorbo Bole (যে ছায়ারে ধরব বলে)" (Prem (Love) 4)	Chhayanat / Dadra	4:23
7.	"Aji Godhulilagane (আজি গোধূলিলগনে)" (Prem (Love) 52)	Bihag / Dadra	4:44
8.	"Chitta Pipasita Re (চিত্ত পিপাসিত রে)" (Prem (Love) 1)	Khamaj / Jhaptal	4:56
9.	"Shesh Belakar Shesher Gaane (শেষ বেলাকার শেষের গানে)" (Prem (Love) 167)	Kafi / Tevra	3:15
10.	"Amar Poran Loye (আমার পরান লয়ে)" (Prem (Love) 31)	Kanada / Madhyaman	7:36

== Rare Gems from Tagore (2010) ==
This is a 3-volume compilation of rare songs by Rabindranath Tagore.

Rare Gems from Tagore – Volume 3

Studio album by Kamalini Mukherji and others
- Released: 2010
- Genre: Rabindra Sangeet, World Music
- Length: 4:51 (Mukherji's track)
- Label: Saregama

All tracks are written by Rabindranath Tagore

No.	Title	Raga / Tala	Length
8.	"Parbi Na Ki Jog Dite Ei Chhonde Re (পারবি না কি যোগ দিতে এই ছন্দে রে)" (Puja (Devotional) 315)	Bahar / Tevra	4:51

== Tagore 4 2moro (2010) ==
This is an experimental presentation of Rabindra Sangeet in an unconventional soundscape featuring Mukherji, Aditi Gupta, Rupankar Bagchi, and others. The music for this album has been arranged by Neel Dutt.

Tagore 4 2moro

Studio album by Kamalini Mukherji and others
- Released: 2010
- Genre: Rabindra Sangeet, World Music
- Length: 7:42 (Mukherji's tracks)
- Label: Saregama

All tracks are written by Rabindranath Tagore

No.	Title	Raga / Tala	Length
6.	"Aji Jhara Jhara Mukhara Badardine (আজি ঝরো ঝরো মুখর বাদরদিনে)" (Prakriti (nature) 129)	Kafi / 2 + 2 Beat	2:56
8.	"Jadi Tor Dak Shune Keu Na Ashe (যদি তোর ডাক শুনে কেউ না আসে)" (Swadesh (Patriotic) 3)	Baul / Dadra	4:46

== Eshechho Prem (2010) ==
This is Mukherji's first individual Rabindra Sangeet album with Saregama.

Eshechho Prem

Studio album by Kamalini Mukherji
- Released: 2010
- Genre: Rabindra Sangeet, World Music
- Length: 43:45
- Label: Saregama

All tracks are written by Rabindranath Tagore

No.	Title	Raga / Tala	Length
1.	"Amar Praner Manush Aacche Prane (আমার প্রাণের মানুষ আছে প্রাণে)" (Puja (Devotional) 549)	Baul / Dadra	3:31
2.	"Biras Din Biral Kaaj (বিরস দিন বিরল কাজ)" (Prem (Love) 28)	Khamaj / Jhampak	3:26
3.	"E Ki Satya Sakali Satya (এ কি সত্য সকলই সত্য)" (Natyageeti (Musical Drama) 58)	Mishra-Jhinjhoti-Khamaj / Dadra	3:10
4.	"Aaj Bujhi Aailo Priyotamo (আজ বুঝি আইল প্রিয়তম)" (Puja O Prarthana (Devotional and Love) 51)	Sahana / Trital	3:43
5.	"Tumi Kon Bhanganer Pathe (তুমি কোন্‌ ভাঙনের পথে)" (Prem (Love) 221)	Kafi-Kanada/ 2 + 2 Beat	5:07
6.	"Nidrahara Raater E Gaan (নিদ্রাহারা রাতের এ গান)" (Prem (Love) 12)	Gaud Sarand / Shashthi	4:35
7.	"Deep Nibe Gechhe Mamo (দীপ নিবে গেছে মম)" (Prem (Love) 287)	Bihag / Ardha Jhap	5:59
8.	"Amar Nishitharater Badaldhara (আমার নিশীথরাতের বাদলধারা)" (Prem (Love) 68)	Bihag / Keherwa-Dadra	4:12
9.	"Mone Rabe Ki Na Rabe Amare (মনে রবে কি না রবে আমারে)" (Prem (Love) 10)	Khamaj / Keherwa	4:14
10.	"Aha, Tomar Sange Praner Khela (আহা তোমার সঙ্গে প্রাণের খেলা)" (Prem (Love) 88)	Pilu / Dadra	5:48

== Bibagi Hiya (2011) ==
This album is a mix of some very popular songs of Tagore along with a few of his less-heard creations.

Bibagi Hiya

Studio album by Kamalini Mukherji
- Released: 2011
- Genre: Rabindra Sangeet, World Music
- Length: 49:26
- Label: Saregama

All tracks are written by Rabindranath Tagore

No.	Title	Raga / Tala	Length
1.	"Amar Bhanga Pather Ranga Dhulay (আমার ভাঙা পথের রাঙা ধুলায়)" (Puja (Devotional) 573)	Bihag / Dadra	4:39
2.	"Sukhoheen Nishideen (সুখহীন নিশিদিন)" (Puja (Devotional) 439)	Nat Malhar / Trital	3:56
3.	"Khelaghar Bandhtey Legechhi (খেলাঘর বাঁধতে লেগেছি)" (Bichitra (Miscellaneous) 26)	Mishra Kedar-Khamaj / Dadra	5:46
4.	"Bahir Pathe Bibagi Hiya (বাহির-পথে বিবাগি হিয়া)" (Prem (Love) 321)	Vrindavani Sarang / Jhampak	5:15
5.	"Amar Mon Maane Na (আমার মন মানে না)" (Prem (Love) 58)	Pilu-Bhimpalasi-Kirtan / Ektal	4:54
6.	"Bhenge Mor Gharer Chabi (ভেঙে মোর ঘরের চাবি)" (Puja (Devotional) 58)	Baul / Dadra	4:26
7.	"Jibonmaraner Seemana Chharaye (জীবনমরণের সীমানা ছাড়ায়ে)" (Puja (Devotional) 13)	Bihag / Rupkada	4:24
8.	"Gaanguli Mor Shoibaleri Dol (গানগুলি মোর শৈবালেরই দল)" (Prem (Love) 5)	Kafi / Keherwa	3:38
9.	"Majhe Majhe Tabo Dekha Pai (মাঝে মাঝে তব দেখা পাই)" (Puja (Devotional) 394)	Kafi / Dadra	5:02
10.	"Baaje Korun Shure (বাজে করুণ সুরে)" (Prem (Love) 197)	Simhendramadhyamam / None	7:26

== Bandho Bhangar Chhando (2011) ==
This is a selection of 10 fast-paced, rhythmic songs of Tagore.

Bandho Bhangar Chhando

Studio album by Kamalini Mukherji
- Released: 2011
- Genre: Rabindra Sangeet, World Music
- Length: 33:17
- Label: Saregama

All tracks are written by Rabindranath Tagore

No.	Title	Raga / Tala	Length
1.	"Rim Jhim Ghana Ghana Re (রিম্‌ ঝিম্‌ ঘন ঘন রে বরষে)" (Valmiki Pratibha 29)	Malhar / Trital	3:17
2.	"Phagun Hawoay Hawoay (ফাগুন, হাওয়ায় হাওয়ায়)" (Prakriti (Nature) 241)	Baul / Dadra-Khemta	3:13
3.	"Utaldhara Badal Jhare (উতল-ধারা বাদল ঝরে)" (Prakriti (Nature) 62)	Des / Keherwa	3:29
4.	"Amar Moner Koner Baire (আমার মনের কোণের বাইরে)" (Prakriti (Nature) 158)	Kafi / Dadra	3:11
5.	"Mor Bhabonare Ki Hawoay (মোর ভাবনারে কী হাওয়ায়)" (Prakriti (Nature) 123)	Gaud-Malhar / Trital	4:04
6.	"Dakhin Hawoa Jago Jago (দখিন-হাওয়া, জাগো জাগো)" (Prakriti (Nature) 218)	Bihag / Keherwa	3:29
7.	"Bajramanik Diye Gantha (বজ্রমানিক দিয়ে গাঁথা)" (Prakriti (Nature) 58)	Jhinjhoti-Baul / Dadra	4:01
8.	"Srabonero Gaganero Gaaye (শ্রাবণের গগনের গায়)" (Prakriti (Nature) 130)	Megh Malhar / Trital	4:25
9.	"Dekho Dekho, Dekho Shuktara (দেখো দেখো, দেখো, শুকতারা)" (Prakriti (Nature) 159)	Kalingada / Dadra	3:55
10.	"Aj Khela Bhangar Khela (আজ খেলা ভাঙার খেলা)" (Prakriti (Nature) 231)	Khamaj / Keherwa	3:26

== Romancing Tagore (2012) ==
Romancing Tagore is a collaborative effort between Indian and Pakistani artists, Kamalini Mukherji, Shubha Mudgal, Najam Sheraz, Debojyoti Mishra, and Indira Varma to present Tagore's songs in Urdu. The song listed below has been sung by Mukherji and Najam Sheraz.

Romancing Tagore

Studio album by Kamalini Mukherji and others
- Released: 2012
- Genre: Rabindra Sangeet, World Music
- Length: 7:15 (Mukherji's track)
- Label: Saregama

All tracks are written by Rabindranath Tagore

No.	Title	Raga / Tala	Length
3.	"Aamar Hiyar Majhe Lukiye Chhile and Maine Tumko Nahin Paaya... (আমার হিয়ার মাঝে লুকিয়ে ছিলে)" (Puja (Devotional) 50)	Pilu / Ektal	7:15

== Priyo Rabibabu (2012) ==
Adapted from the novel Ranu O Bhanu written by Sunil Gangopadhyay, this album is a composite presentation of narration by Sutapa Bandyopadhyay and Probal Mallik, and songs by Kamalini Mukherji and Promit Sen. The music was arranged by Kalyan Sen Barat.

Priyo Rabibabu

Studio album by Kamalini Mukherji and others
- Released: 2012
- Genre: Rabindra Sangeet, World Music
- Length: 32:23 (Mukherji's tracks)
- Label: Saregama

All tracks are written by Rabindranath Tagore

No.	Title	Raga / Tala	Length
1.	"Tumi Kichhu Diye Jao (তুমি কিছু দিয়ে যাও)" (Prakriti (Nature) 251)	Khamaj / Keherwa	4:09
3.	"Tumi Daak Diyechho Kon Sakaale (তুমি ডাক দিয়েছ কোন্‌ সকালে)" (Puja (Devotional) 161)	Pilu-Bhimpalasi / Dadra	8:30
7.	"Amar Nayan Tabo Nayaner (আমার নয়ন তব নয়নের)" (Prem (Love) 48)	Pilu / Dadra	3:47
9.	"Amar Sakal Niye Boshe Achhi (আমার সকল নিয়ে বসে আছি)" (Prem (Love) 89)	Khamaj / Dadra	4:45
10.	"Amar Paran Loye Ki Khela (আমার পরান লয়ে কী খেলা)" (Prem (Love) 31)	Kanada / Madhyaman	6:13
12.	"Amar Jole Ni Aalo (আমার জ্বলে নি আলো)" (Prem (Love) 257)	Bihag-Khamaj / Shashthi	5:59

== Brishti Ashe (2012) ==
This album is a compilation of ten songs for the monsoon season.

Brishti Ashe

Studio album by Kamalini Mukherji
- Released: 2012
- Genre: Rabindra Sangeet, World Music
- Length: 45:27
- Label: Saregama

All tracks are written by Rabindranath Tagore

No.	Title	Raga / Tala	Length
1.	"Oi-Je Jharer Megher (ওই-যে ঝড়ের মেঘের)" (Prakriti (Nature) 63)	Des-Baul / Keherwa	5:09
2.	"Amare Jodi Jagale Aji Nath (আমারে যদি জাগালে আজি নাথ)" (Prakriti (Nature) 97)	Gaud-Malhar / Jhampak	4:17
3.	"Ashadh, Kotha Hote Aj (আষাঢ়, কোথা হতে আজ)" (Prakriti (Nature) 42)	Mishra Megh Malhar / Dadra	3:02
4.	"Aji Jharer Raate (আজি ঝড়ের রাতে)" (Prakriti (Nature) 95)	Malhar / Jhampak	5:28
5.	"Ami Takhan Chihilem Magan (আমি তখন ছিলেম মগন)" (Prakriti (Nature) 105)	Kirtan/ Dadra	4:57
6.	"Emono Dine Taare Bola Jay (এমন দিনে তারে বলা যায়)" (Prakriti (Nature) 248)	Des / Rupak	4:14
7.	"Jharojharo Barishey Baridhara (ঝরঝর বরিষে বারিধারা)" (Prakriti (Nature) 28)	Megh Malhar / Keherwa	5:17
8.	"Amar Din Phuralo (আমার দিন ফুরালো)" (Prakriti (Nature) 36)	Des-Malhar / Dadra	4:32
9.	"Swapne Amar Mone Holo (স্বপ্নে আমার মনে হল)" (Prakriti (Nature) 131)	Hameer / Shashthi	4:28
10.	"Kotha Je Udhao Holo (কোথা যে উধাও হল)" (Prakriti (Nature) 80)	Malhar / Addha Theka	5:06

== Din-Rajani (2013) ==
A collaboration between Kamalini Mukherji (vocal) and Shubhayu Sen Majumdar (esraj), this compilation presents eight songs of Tagore based on eight ragas chronologically from morning (Bhairavi) till late night (Malkauns), each preceded or followed by an esraj piece based on the same raga.

Din-Rajani

Studio album by Kamalini Mukherji
- Released: 2013
- Genre: Rabindra Sangeet, World Music
- Length: 55:07
- Label: Saregama

All tracks are written by Rabindranath Tagore

No.	Title	Raga / Tala	Length
1.	"Bandhu, Kon Aalo Laglo Chokhe (বঁধু, কোন্‌ আলো লাগল চোখে)" (Chitrangada (Dance Drama) 8)	Bhairavi / Keherwa	8:00
2.	"Tomarei Praner Asha Kahibo (তোমারেই প্রাণের আশা কহিব)" (Puja O Prarthana (Devotional and Love) 16)	Asavari-Bhairav / Keherwa	5:28
3.	"Kar Milan Chao Birahi (কার মিলন চাও বিরহী)" (Puja (Devotional) 428)	Shree / Tevra	7:21
4.	"Ei Korechho Bhalo (এই করেছ ভালো)" (Puja (Devotional) 223)	Yaman Kalyan / Ektal	7:11
5.	"Aaj Jyotsnaraate (আজ জ্যোৎস্নারাতে)" (Puja (Devotional) 146)	Bihag / Tevra	6:14
6.	"Amar Kantha Hote (আমার কণ্ঠ হতে)" (Prem (Love) 13)	Khamaj-Baul / Dadra-Khemta	6:46
7.	"E Parobase (এ পরবাসে)" (Puja (Devotional) 435)	Mishra-Kafi / None	6:12
8.	"Anandadhara Bohichhe Bhubane (আনন্দধারা বহিছে ভুবনে)" (Puja (Devotional))	Mishra-Malkaush / Trital	7:55

== Hothat Khushi (2014) ==
This album is a compilation of ten songs from primarily the Puja (devotional songs) and Prem (love songs) sections of Tagore's work, and includes classics such as Krishnakoli Ami Tarei Boli, which also provides the title of the album.

Hothat Khushi

Studio album by Kamalini Mukherji
- Released: 2014
- Genre: Rabindra Sangeet, World Music
- Length: 45:27
- Label: Saregama

All tracks are written by Rabindranath Tagore

No.	Title	Raga / Tala	Length
1.	"Amar Matha Nato Kore Dao Hey (আমার মাথা নত করে দাও হে)" (Puja (Devotional) 492)	Yaman Kalyan / Tevra	4:26
2.	"Tomar Katha Hetha Keho To Bole Na (তোমার কথা হেথা কেহ তো বলে না)" (Puja (Devotional) 395)	Yaman-Bhopali / Ektal	4:59
3.	"More Bare Bare Phirale (মোরে বারে বারে ফিরালে)" (Puja (Devotional) 430)	Nat Malhar / Ektal	4:06
4.	"Bahe Nirantar Ananta Anandadhara (বহে নিরন্তর অনন্ত আনন্দধারা)" (Puja (Devotional) 324)	Lachchasakh-Bilaval / Jhaptal	3:29
5.	"Krishnakoli Ami Tarei Boli (কৃষ্ণকলি আমি তারেই বলি)" (Bichitra (Miscellaneous) 75)	Kirtan / Ardha Jhap	6:02
6.	"Tomar Khola Haowa Lagiye Paale (তোমার খোলা হাওয়া লাগিয়ে পালে)" (Puja (Devotional) 553)	Folk / Keherwa	4:02
7.	"Amar Praner Pare Chole Gelo Ke (আমার প্রাণের 'পরে চলে গেল কে)" (Prem (Love) 192)	Pilu-Kalingada-Paraj-Kirtan/ Adhkhemta	4:13
8.	"Biraho Madhur Holo Aji Madhurate (বিরহ মধুর হল আজি মধুরাতে)" (Prem (Love) 262)	Bihag / Trital	5:01
9.	"Khelar Sathi, Bidaydwar Kholo (খেলার সাথি, বিদায়দ্বার খোলো)" (Puja O Prarthana (Devotional and Love) 77)	Pilu-Barwa / None	5:36
10.	"Anandagan Uthuk Tabe Baaji (আনন্দগান উঠুক তবে বাজি)" (Puja (Devotional) 309)	Bahar-Khamaj / Dadra	3:33

== Best of Kamalini (2016) ==
This double-CD album is a compilation released by Saregama, containing some of Mukherji's most popular songs.

Best of Kamalini

Compilation album by Kamalini Mukherji
- Released: 2016
- Genre: Rabindra Sangeet, World Music
- Length: 74:42 (Vol. I); 82:08 (Vol. II)
- Label: Saregama

All tracks are written by Rabindranath Tagore

Volume 1
No.	Title	Raga / Tala	Length
1.	"Amar Praner Manush Aacche Prane (আমার প্রাণের মানুষ আছে প্রাণে)" (Puja (Devotional) 549)	Baul / Dadra	3:31
2.	"Aaj Bujhi Aailo Priyotamo (আজ বুঝি আইল প্রিয়তম)" (Puja O Prarthana (Devotional and Love) 51)	Sahana / Trital	3:43
3.	"Aha, Tomar Sange Praner Khela (আহা তোমার সঙ্গে প্রাণের খেলা)" (Prem (Love) 88)	Pilu / Dadra	5:48
4.	"Amar Mon Maane Na (আমার মন মানে না)" (Prem (Love) 58)	Pilu-Bhimpalasi-Kirtan / Ektal	4:54
5.	"Bhenge Mor Gharer Chabi (ভেঙে মোর ঘরের চাবি)" (Puja (Devotional) 58)	Baul / Dadra	4:26
6.	"Amar Moner Koner Baire (আমার মনের কোণের বাইরে)" (Prem (Love) 158)	Kafi / Dadra	3:11
7.	"Aji Jharer Raate (আজি ঝড়ের রাতে)" (Prakriti (Nature) 95)	Malhar / Jhampak	5:28
8.	"Ami Takhan Chihilem Magan (আমি তখন ছিলেম মগন)" (Prakriti (Nature) 105)	Kirtan / Dadra	4:57
9.	"Emono Dine Taare Bola Jay (এমন দিনে তারে বলা যায়)" (Prakriti (Nature) 248)	Des / Rupak	4:14
10.	"Swapne Amar Mone Holo (স্বপ্নে আমার মনে হল)" (Prakriti (Nature) 131)	Hameer / Shashthi	4:28
11.	"Krishnakoli Ami Tarei Boli (কৃষ্ণকলি আমি তারেই বলি)" (Bichitra (Miscellaneous) 75)	Kirtan / Ardha Jhap	6:02
12.	"Tomar Khola Haowa Lagiye Paale (তোমার খোলা হাওয়া লাগিয়ে পালে)" (Puja (Devotional) 553)	Folk / Keherwa	4:02
13.	"Biraho Madhur Holo Aji Madhurate (বিরহ মধুর হল আজি মধুরাতে)" (Prem (Love) 262)	Bihag / Trital	5:01
14.	"Anandadhara Bohichhe Bhubane (আনন্দধারা বহিছে ভুবনে)" (Puja (Devotional))	Mishra Malkaush / Trital	7:55
15.	"Bahe Nirantar Ananta Anandadhara (বহে নিরন্তর অনন্ত আনন্দধারা)" (Puja (Devotional) 324)	Lachchasakh-Bilaval / Jhaptal	3:29
16.	"Anandagan Uthuk Tabe Baaji (আনন্দগান উঠুক তবে বাজি)" (Puja (Devotional) 309)	Bahar-Khamaj / Dadra	3:33

Volume 2
No.	Title	Raga / Tala	Length
1.	"Baaje Korun Shure (বাজে করুণ সুরে)" (Prem (Love) 197)	Simhendramadhyamam / None	7:26
2.	"Tumi Kon Bhanganer Pathe (তুমি কোন্‌ ভাঙনের পথে)" (Prem (Love) 221)	Kafi Kanada / 2 + 2 Beat	5:07
3.	"Deep Nibe Gechhe Mamo (দীপ নিবে গেছে মম)" (Prem (Love) 287)	Bihag / Ardha Jhap	5:59
4.	"Mone Rabe Ki Na Rabe Amare (মনে রবে কি না রবে আমারে)" (Prem (Love) 10)	Khamaj / Keherwa	4:14
5.	"Baro Bedonar Mato (বড়ো বেদনার মতো)" (Prem (Love) 57)	Kalingada / Ektal	3:26
6.	"Amar Jwaleni Aalo Andhakare (আমার জ্বলে নি আলো অন্ধকারে)" (Prem (Love) 257)	Bihag-Khamaj / Shashthi	5:59
7.	"More Bare Bare Phirale (মোরে বারে বারে ফিরালে)" (Puja (Devotional) 192)	Nat Malhar / Ektal	4:06
8.	"Amar Praner Pare Chole Gelo Ke (আমার প্রাণের 'পরে চলে গেল কে)" (Prem (Love) 192)	Pilu-Kalingada-Paraj-Kirtan / Adhkhemta	4:13
9.	"Amar Bhanga Pather Ranga Dhulay (আমার ভাঙা পথের রাঙা ধুলায়)" (Puja (Devotional) 573)	Bihag / Dadra	4:39
10.	"Sukhoheen Nishideen (সুখহীন নিশিদিন)" (Puja (Devotional) 439)	Nat Malhar / Trital	3:56
11.	"Jibonmaraner Seemana Chharaye (জীবনমরণের সীমানা ছাড়ায়ে)" (Puja (Devotional) 13)	Bihag / Rupkada	4:24
12.	"Ei Korechho Bhalo (এই করেছ ভালো)" (Puja (Devotional) 223)	Yaman Kalyan / Ektal	7:11
13.	"Aaj Jyotsnaraate (আজ জ্যোৎস্নারাতে)" (Puja (Devotional) 146)	Bihag / Tevra	6:14
14.	"Kotha Je Udhao Holo (কোথা যে উধাও হল)" (Prakriti (Nature) 80)	Malhar / Addha Theka	5:06
15.	"Amar Din Phuralo (আমার দিন ফুরালো)" (Prakriti (Nature) 36)	Desh-Malhar / Dadra	4:32
16.	"Khelar Sathi Bidaydwar Kholo (খেলার সাথি, বিদায়দ্বার খোলো)" (Puja O Prarthana (Devotional and Love) 77)	Pilu-Barwa / None	5:36
