= Tabla =

Pair of hand drums from South Asia

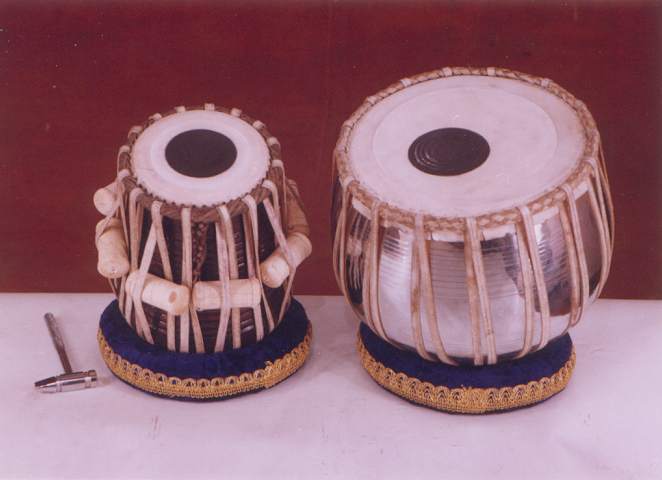

Percussion instrument
- Classification: Membranophone percussion instrument
- Hornbostel–Sachs classification: 211.12 (Sets of instruments in which the body of the drum is dish- or bowl-shaped)
- Developed: 18th century, India

Playing range
- One octave (variable)

Related instruments
- Pakhavaj, mridangam, khol, dholak, nagara, madal, tbilat, jori, bongos

A demo of tabla playing

The tabla (Note: In other languages: Assamese: তবলা, Bengali: তবলা, Dari: طبلا, Gujarati: તબલા, Hindi: तबला, Kannada: ತಬಲಾ, Malayalam: തബല, Marathi: तबला, Nepali: तबला, Odia: ତବଲା, Pashto: طبله, Punjabi: ਤਬਲਾ, Sinhala: තබ්ලාව, Tamil: தபலா, Telugu: తబలా, Urdu: طبلہ) is a pair of hand drums from South Asia, particularly the Indian subcontinent. Since the 18th century, it has been the principal percussion instrument in Hindustani classical music, where it may be played solo, as an accompaniment with other instruments and vocals, or as a part of larger ensembles. It is frequently played in traditional, popular and folk music performances in India, Bangladesh, Afghanistan, Pakistan, Nepal, and Sri Lanka. The tabla is an essential instrument in the bhakti devotional traditions of Hinduism and Sikhism, such as during bhajan and kirtan singing. It is one of the main qawwali instruments used by Sufi musicians. The instrument also features in dance performances such as kathak.

The word tabla likely comes from tabl, the Arabic word for drum. The ultimate origin of the musical instrument is contested by scholars, though the earliest evidence traces its evolution from indigenous musical instruments of the Indian subcontinent; drum-like structure is mentioned in Vedic-era texts.

The tabla consists of two small drums of slightly different sizes and shapes. Each drum is made of hollowed-out wood, clay, or metal. The smaller drum (dayan / tabla) is used to create treble and tonal sounds, while the larger drum (baya / dagga) primarily produces bass. They are laced with hoops, thongs, and wooden dowels on their sides, which adjust the tension of the membranes to tune the drums.

The playing technique is complex and involves extensive use of the fingers and palms in various configurations to create a wide variety of different sounds and rhythms, reflected in mnemonic syllables (bol).

== Origins ==
=== Traditions ===
According to legend, the tabla was derived from the ancient barrel drum known as mridana, which the deity Krishna is said to have cut in half to create the tabla. The history of the tabla is unclear and there are multiple theories regarding its origin. There are two groups of theories; the first theorizes that the instrument had indigenous origins while the other traces its origins to the Muslim and Mughal invaders of the Indian subcontinent. While the 2nd-century BCE carvings in Bhaja Caves support the theory that the instrument had indigenous origins, clear pictorial evidence of the drum emerges only from about 1745; the drum continued to develop in shape until the early 1800s.

=== Indian origins ===
According to one theory, the origin of the tabla is traced to an ancient indigenous civilization. The stone carvings in the Bhaja Caves depict a woman playing a pair of drums, which have been cited as evidence of the tabla's ancient origin in India. A different version of this theory states that the tabla acquired a new Arabic name during the Islamic rule, having evolved from ancient Indian puśkara drums. Evidence of the hand-held puśkara appears in many temple carvings, such as at the 6th- and 7th-century Muktesvara and Bhuvaneswara temples in India. These carvings show seated drummers, with two or three separate small drums, with their palm and fingers positioned as if they are playing those drums. However, it is not apparent in any of these ancient carvings that those drums were made of the same material and skin, or played the same music, as the modern tabla.

Sanskrit texts provide textual evidence of instruments of similar material and construction methods as the tabla. The earliest discussion of tabla-like musical instrument building methods is found in the Hindu text Natyashastra. This text also includes descriptions of paste-patches (syahi) such as those found on a tabla. The Natyashastra also discusses how to play these drums. The South Indian text Silappatikaram, likely composed in the early centuries of the 1st millennium CE, describes thirty types of drums along with many other instruments. These are, however, called pushkara; the name tabla appears in later periods.

=== Muslim and Mughal origins ===
This theory is based on the etymological link between the word tabla and the Arabic word tabl, which means "drum". Beyond the root of the word, this proposal points to the documentary evidence that the Muslim armies had hundreds of soldiers on camels and horses carrying paired drums as they invaded the Indian subcontinent. They would beat these drums to scare the residents, the non-Muslim armies, their elephants and chariots, whom they intended to attack. However, the war drums did not look or sound anything like tabla; they were large, paired drums called naqqara ('noise, chaos makers').

Another version states that Amir Khusraw, a musician patronized by Sultan Alauddin Khalji, invented the tabla by cutting a hourglass-shaped awaj drum in half. However, no painting, sculpture, or document dated to his period supports this claim, nor was it found in the list of musical instruments recorded by Muslim historians. For example, Abul Fazi included a long list of musical instruments in his Ain-i-akbari written during the time of the 16th-century Mughal Emperor Akbar, the generous patron of music. Abul Fazi's list makes no mention of tabla.

The third version credits the invention of the tabla to the 18th-century musician with a similarly sounding name, Amir Khusru, who is said to have cut a pakhavaj in half to create a tabla. Miniature paintings of this era depict instruments that somewhat resemble the tabla. This theory implies that tabla emerged from within the Muslim community of Indian subcontinent and were not an Arabian import. However, scholars such as Neil Sorrell and Ram Narayan state that this legend of cutting a pakhawaj drum into two to make tabla drums "cannot be given any credence".

== History ==
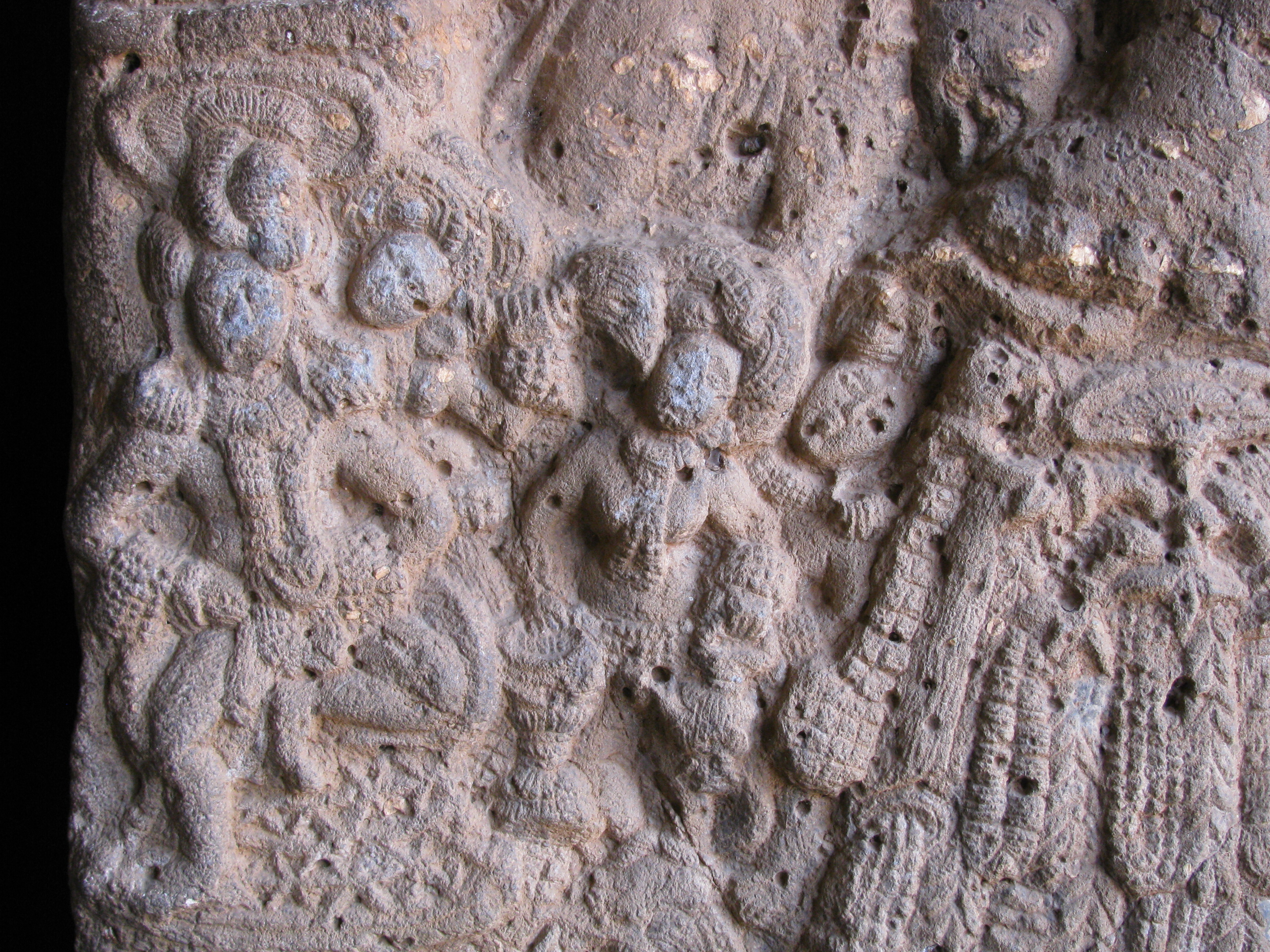
Stone carvings at Bhaja Caves, Maharashtra, showing a woman playing a pair of drums and another dancer performing (200 BCE)

Drums and talas are mentioned in Vedic-era texts. A percussion musical instrument with two or three small drums, held with strings, called pushkara (also spelled pushkala) existed in the pre-5th century Indian subcontinent, along with other drums such as the mridang; however, these were not called 'tabla' at the time. The pre-5th century paintings in the Ajanta Caves, for example, show a group of musicians playing small tabla-like upright seated drums, a kettle-shaped mridang drum, and cymbals. Similar artwork with seated musicians playing drums is found carved in stone at the Ellora Caves and elsewhere.

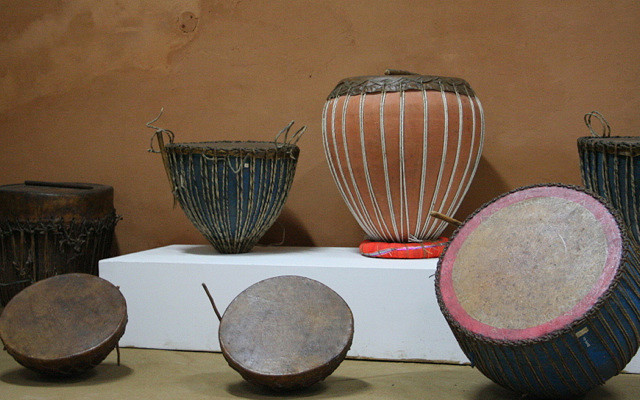
Some drums of central India that look like tabla but lack syahi, which creates the unique tabla sound

A type of small Indian drum, along with many other musical instruments, is also mentioned in Tibetan and Chinese memoirs written by Buddhist monks who visited the Indian subcontinent in the 1st millennium CE. The pushkala are called rdzogs pa (pronounced 'dzokpa') in Tibetan literature. The pushkara drums are also mentioned in many ancient Jainism and Buddhism texts, such as Samavayasutra, Lalitavistara, and Sutralamkara.

Tabla-like drums were spread widely across ancient India. Various Hindu and Jain temples—such as the Eklingji in Udaipur, Rajasthan—feature stone carvings of a person playing a small pair of tabla-like drums; some of these temple carvings date back to 500 BCE. A Hoysaleshwara temple in Karnataka features a carving of a woman playing the tabla during a dance performance. Small drums were popular during the Yadava rule (1210–1247) in the south, at the time when the Sangita Ratnakara was written by Sarangadeva. Madhava Kandali, a 14th century Assamese poet and writer of the Saptakanda Ramayana, lists several instruments in his version of Ramayana, such as tabal, jhajhar, dotara, vina, bīn, and vipanchi—meaning that these instruments already existed in the 14th century or earlier. There is recent iconography of the drum-like structure dating back to 1799.

According to classifications of musical instruments defined in the Natyashastra, the tabla is classified in the Avanadha Vadya category of rhythm instruments, which are made by capping an empty vessel with a stretched skin.

== Construction and features ==
The tabla consists of two single-headed, barrel-shaped small drums of slightly different sizes and shapes: the baya and daya for the left and right drums, respectively.

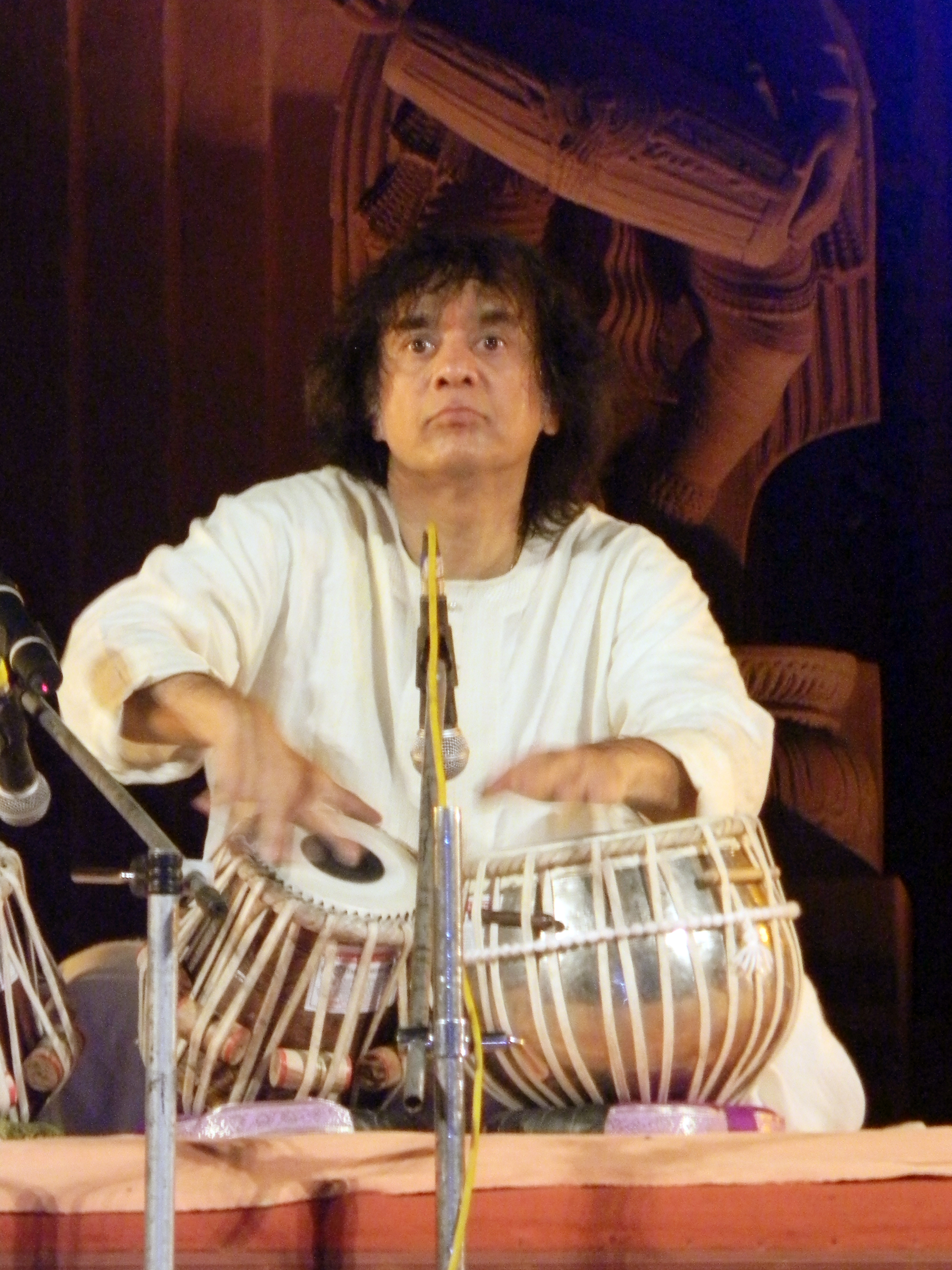
Ustad Zakir Hussain performing at Konark, Odisha. This illustrates the common sitting position used by tabla players.

The smaller drum, played with the dominant hand, is called dayan (literally "right" side), dāhina, siddha, or chattū, but is correctly called the "tabla". It is made from a conical piece of mostly teak and rosewood hollowed out to approximately half of its total depth. The daya tabla is played by the musician's right hand (dominant hand), and is about 15 centimetres (5.9 in) in diameter and 25 centimetres (9.8 in) high. The drum is tuned to a specific note, usually either the tonic, dominant, or subdominant of the soloist's key and thus complements the melody. This is the ground note of the raga called Sa (the tonic in Indian music). The tuning range is limited, although different dāyāñs are produced in different sizes, each with a different range. Cylindrical wood blocks, termed gatta, are inserted between the strap and the shell, allowing tension to be adjusted by their vertical positioning. Fine-tuning is achieved while striking vertically on the braided portion of the head using a small, heavy hammer. While tabla usually features two drums, a tabla tarang may consist of 10–16 dayas for performing melodies based on several ragas.

The baya tabla is a bit bigger and kettledrum-shaped, about 20 centimetres (7.9 in) in diameter and 25 centimetres (9.8 in) in height. Played with the non-dominant hand, it is called bāyāñ (literally "left"), duggī, or dhāmā (correctly called "dagga"), and has a much deeper bass tone, much like its distant cousin, the kettle drum. The bāyāñs consist of many different materials. Brass is the most common; copper is more expensive but generally considered the best; aluminum and steel are often found in inexpensive models. Sometimes wood is used, especially in old bāyāñs from the Punjab. Clay is also used, although not favored for durability; these are generally found in the North-East region of Bengal. The baya construction and tuning is about a fifth to an octave below that of the daya drum. The musician uses the heel pressure of their hand to change the pitch and tone color of each drum during a performance.

The head of each drum has a central area of black "tuning paste" called the syahi (lit. 'ink'; a.k.a. shāī or gāb). Syahi is common on many Indian-origin drums. This method allows these drums to produce harmonic overtones and is responsible for their unique sound. Syahi is constructed using multiple layers of a paste made from starch (rice or wheat) mixed with a black powder of various origins. The precise construction and shaping of this area are responsible for modifying the drum's natural overtones, resulting in pitch clarity (see inharmonicity) and a variety of tonal possibilities unique to this instrument, which has a bell-like sound. The skill required for the proper construction of this area is highly refined and the main differentiating factor in an instrument's quality. The earliest discussion of these paste-patches is found in the Hindu text Natyashastra.

For stability while playing, each drum is positioned on a toroidal bundle called chutta or guddi, consisting of plant fiber or another malleable material wrapped in cloth. They are commonly played while sitting cross-legged on the floor.

== Musical notation ==
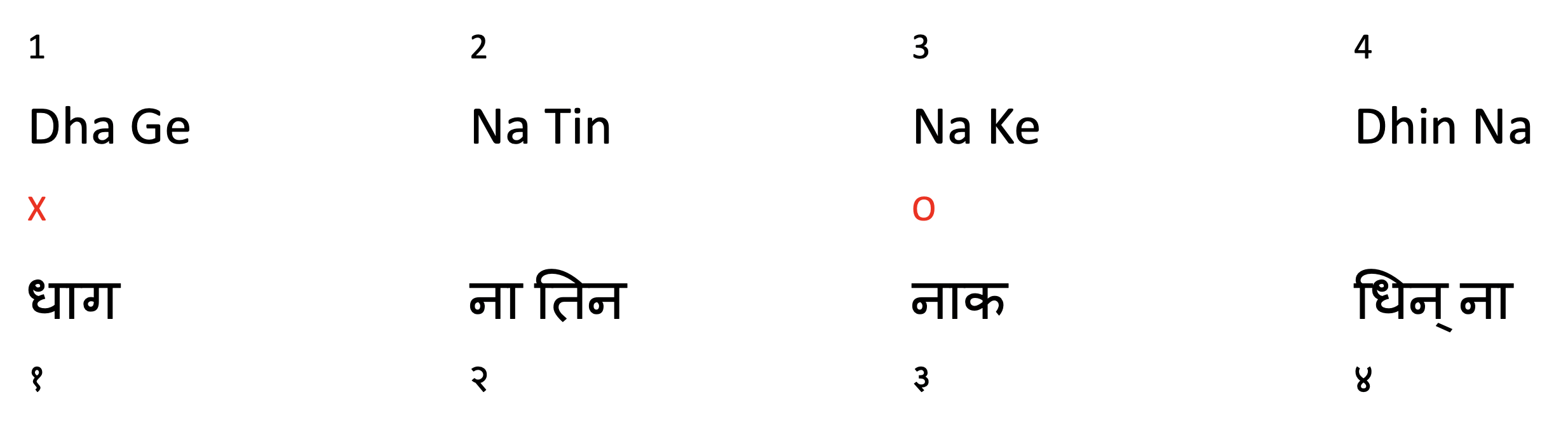
Keharwa Taal written in Vishnu Narayan Bhatkhande notation. The bols are written in both Latin and Devanagari. The matras (beat measure) are specified using numerals. 'X' indicates sum (first beat) and 'O' indicates khaali.

Indian music is traditionally practice-oriented and, until the 20th century, did not employ written notation as the primary medium of instruction, understanding, or transmission. The rules of Indian music and compositions themselves are taught in person from a guru to a shishya. Thus, oral notation for tabla strokes and compositions is highly developed and precise. These are made up of onomatopoetic syllables and are known as bols.

Written notation is regarded as a matter of taste and is not standardized. Thus, there is no universal system of written notation for the rest of the world to study Indian music. The two popular systems for writing notations were created by Vishnu Digambar Paluskar and Vishnu Narayan Bhatkhande. These notations are named after their respective creators. Both of these systems have bols written in scripts such as Latin or Devanagari. The differences arise in the representation of various concepts of a composition, such as taali, khaali, sum (the first beat in a rhythmic cycle), and khand (divisions). Another difference is the use of numerals in the Vishnu Narayan Bhatkande system to represent matras and beat measures, whereas more sophisticated symbols are used in the Vishnu Digambar Paluskar system to denote one matra, its fractions, and combinations.

== Basic strokes ==
Tabla's repertoire and techniques draw many elements from the pakhavaj and mridangam, both of which are played sideways with the palms. The physical structure of these drums also shares similar components: the smaller pakhavaj head for the dayan, the naqqara kettledrum for the bayan, and the flexible use of the bass of the dholak. Tabla is played from the top and uses "fingertip and hand percussive" techniques, allowing more complex movements. The rich language of tabla is made up of permutations of some basic strokes. These basic strokes are divided into five major categories along with a few examples:

1. Bols played on the daya (right/treble drum)
  - Na: striking the edge of the syahi with the last two fingers of the right hand
  - Ta or Ra: striking sharply with the index finger against the rim while simultaneously applying gentle pressure to the edge of the syahi with the ring finger to suppress the fundamental vibration mode
  - Tin: placing the last two fingers of the right hand lightly against the syahi and striking on the border between the syahi and the maidan (resonant)
  - Te: striking the center of the syahi with the middle finger in Delhi gharana, or using middle, ring, and little fingers together in Varanasi style (non-resonant)
  - Ti: striking the center of the syahi with the index finger (non-resonant)
  - Tun: striking the center of the syahi with the index finger to excite the fundamental vibration mode (resonant)
  - TheRe: striking of syahi with palm
2. Bols played on baya (left / bass drum)
  - Ghe: holding wrist down and arching the fingers over the syahi; the middle and ring-fingers then strike the maidan (resonant)
  - Ga: striking the index finger
  - Ka, Ke, or Kat: (on bayan) striking with the flat palm and fingers (non-resonant)
3. Bols played on both the drums on unison
  - Dha: combination of Na and (Ga or Ghe)
  - Dhin: combination of Tin and (Ga or Ghe)
4. Bols played one after another in a successive manner
  - Ti Re Ki Ta
  - TaK = Ta + Ke
5. Bols played as flam
  - Ghran: Ge immediately followed by Na
  - TriKe: Ti immediately followed by Ke and Te

== Tabla talas ==
Tala defines the musical meter of a composition. It is characterized by groups of matras in a defined time cycle. Talas are composed of basic elements, bols. Matra defines the number of beats within a rhythm. Talas can be of 3 to 108 matras. They are played in repeated cycles. The starting beat of each cycle is known as sum, and often represented by a special symbol such as 'X'. This is the most emphasized beat of the cycle. Other emphasized parts of the tala are represented by taali (clap), often marked by a numeral representing its beat measure. Khali (empty) portions are played in a relaxed manner. They are represented by an 'O' in Vishnu Narayanan Bhatkhande notation. Separate sections or stanzas of a tala are called vibhagas.

Three main types of tempos or layas are used in playing tabla talas: (1) slow (vilambit) or half speed, (2) medium (madhya) or reference speed, and (3) fast (drut) or double speed. Keeping these three tempos as a reference, other variations of these tempos are also defined, such as aadi laya, where bols are played at one and a half times the medium tempo. Another example is Ati Ati drut laya, which stands for a very fast tempo. Modern tabla players often use beats per minute measures as well.

There are many talas in Hindustani music. Teental (or Trital) is one of the most popular talas played on the tabla. It has 16-beat matras (measures), and can be written down as 4 sections of 4 matras each. Teental can be played at both slow and fast speeds. Other talas, such as Dhamaar, Ek, Jhoomra, and Chau, are better suited to slow and medium tempos. In contrast, some talas flourish at faster speeds, such as Jhap and Rupak. Some of the popular talas in Hindustani classical music include:

Name	Beats	Division	Vibhag
Teental (or Trital or Tintal)	16	4+4+4+4	X 2 0 3
Jhoomra	14	3+4+3+4	X 2 0 3
Tilwada	16	4+4+4+4	x 2 0 3
Dhamar	14	5+2+3+4	X 2 0 3
Ektal and Chautal	12	2+2+2+2+2+2	X 0 2 0 3 4
Jhaptal (or Japtal)	10	2+3+2+3	X 2 0 3
Keherwa	8	4+4	X 0
Rupak (Mughlai/Roopak)	7	3+2+2	0 X 2
Dadra	6	3+3	X 0

=== Rare Hindustani talas ===
Name	Beats	Division	Vibhaga
Adachoutal	14	2+2+2+2+2+2+2	X 2 0 3 0 4 0
Brahmtal	28	2+2+2+2+2+2+2+2+2+2+2+2+2+2	X 0 2 3 0 4 5 6 0 7 8 9 10 0
Dipchandi	14	3+4+3+4	X 2 0 3
Shikar	17	6+6+2+3	X 0 3 4
Sultal	10	2+2+2+2+2	x 0 2 3 0
Teevra	7	3+2+2	x 2 3
Ussole e Fakhta	5	1+1+1+1+1	x 3
Farodast	14	3+4+3+4	X 2 0 3
Pancham Savari	15	3+4+4+4	x 2 0 3
Gaj Jhampa	15	5+5+5	x 2 0 3

== Tabla gharanas ==
Tabla gharanas (musical lineages) are responsible for developing a variety of new bols, characteristic playing techniques, compositional styles, and rhythmic structures. Gharanas acted as a means of preserving these styles between generations of tabla players. The earliest recorded history of gharanas dates to the early 18th century. Delhi gharana is considered the first and oldest traditional tabla tradition. Its students were responsible for the spawn of other gharanas as well. Each of these gharanas includes a handful of prominent players and maestros. They carry the honorific titles 'Pandit' and 'Ustad' for Hindu and Muslim tabla players, respectively. Modernization and accessible means of travel have reduced the rigid boundaries between these gharanas in recent times.

The different tabla gharanas include:

- Delhi Gharana
- Lucknow Gharana
- Ajrada Gharana
- Farukhabad Gharana
- Benares Gharana
- Punjab Gharana

== Kayda ==
A kayda or kaida is a type of tabla composition. There are two major types of tabla compositions: fixed (pre-composed) and improvised (composed and improvised at the time of practicing or performing). A rhythmic seed (theme) is introduced, which is then used as a basis for elaboration through improvisation and composition. The word kayda is an Arabic or Hindi word which means 'rule' or a 'system of rules'. The rules for playing a kayda are complex, but in short, one must only use the bols that are in the original theme. This original theme is known as a mukh. The kayda form originated in the Delhi Gharana of tabla playing and serves three fundamental roles for tabla players. The dayan (right-side tabla) and bayan (left-side tabla) are used in synchronization to form a kayda.

Kaydas can be played in any talas. But, Teental and their kaydas are played often at most concerts. Note that in talas like Dadra and Keherwa or in thekas like Bhajani, laggis are played, kaydas are not played. The reason for this is that these talas/thekas are specifically played for semi-classical and light music (Bhajans, Kirtans, Thumris, etc.) and not for Hindustani classical music. Different Gharanas have their own kaydas.

Basic structure of a kayda:

1. Mukh – Basic bol that is the 'face' of the particular kayda. The kayda's bols are structured out of the Mukh.
2. Dohara ('to repeat') – The repetition of the Mukh three times. In Hindi, it is called 'Doharana'.
3. Adha Dohara – The repetition of the first bol of the Mukh.
4. Vishram ('taking rest') – As the name suggests, a minute of pause is taken from the bol.
5. Adha Vishram – The repetition of taking a pause, i.e., repetition of the bol that was repeated in Vishram.
6. Palta ('section') – A variation of bols, either fixed or from only those in the Mukh. Palta is a section of the whole kayda. Strictly speaking, the five previous forms (Mukh, Dohara, Adha Dohara, Vishram, and Adha Vishram) are not themselves repeated. They are played only once. A Palta joins these forms in various combinations to create a section.
7. Tihai – The musical phrase sung or played three times to arrive at the sum. It is the last part of a kayda. The Mukh's last part is played three times and then the particular kayda is ended.

== Notable players ==
- Ustad Ahmed Jan Thirakwa
- Ustad Alla Rakha
- Pandit Kishan Maharaj
- Ustad Zakir Hussain
- Pandit Yogesh Shamsi
- Pandit Suresh Talwalkar
- Pandit Anindo Chatterjee
- Pandit Kumar Bose
- Pandit Nayan Ghosh
- Pandit Shubhankar Banerjee
- Pandit Swapan Chaudhuri

== See also ==
- Damaru
- Dangdut
- Doumbek – Arabian drum also known in Egypt as "tabla", "Egyptian tabla", or "Alexandrian tabla"
- Drum
- Madal
- Mridanga
- Mridangam
- Pakhavaj
- Tbilat
