= Vibhag =

Concept in Indian classical music

Vibhag (in music) represents a duration of rhythmic phrasing in Indian classical music made up of a certain number of beats. They are the rough equivalent of bars in western music, but instead of always being equal subdivisions of the tala (the rhythmic cycle - think 12 bar blues), they can be uneven. In certain traditions of Indian music, any number of [beat (music)|beats] may form a 'Vibhag'. Usually the beats will be in two, three, or four. They should be designated either with a clap or a wave of the hand. The meaning of the word Bhag from is parts. The actual measure of the Vibhag is borders or boundaries or boundary lines, in short not in continuity or not continuous. The talas in Tabla or in any other percussion instrument in classical music have Vibhagas to get a track of the beats on Matras on which the singer or player is singing or playing on. For example taking different talas,

Tala Teental has 16 matras in it. It has 4 Vibhags. So Teental with Vibhags is written as

The Theka for Teental
dha	dhin	dhin	dha	|	dha	dhin	dhin	dha	|
^{x}					^{2}
dha	tin	tin	Na	|	Tetey	dhin	dhin	dha	|
^{o}					^{3}

This can also be shown using the following figure

Taal signs	X				2				0				3			
Maatra	1	2	3	4	5	6	7	8	9	10	11	12	13	14	15	16
Bols	dha	dhin	dhin	dha	dha	dhin	dhin	dha	dha	tin	tin	ta	ta	dhin	dhin	dha

If you see both the tables then you may realize that after every 4 syllables i.e. considering the 1st line so Dha Dhin Dhin Dha after this is a line like this | . This is the symbol of Vibhag. And after the 4 syllables Dha Dhin Dhin Dha is the Vibhag. Now it is simple Maths that if there are 16 matras and if there is a Vibhag after every 4 matras, 2 conclusions are taken out. Those conclusions are that there will be 4 more vibhags after every 4 matra like it was there in the 1st line of Teental which was seen above. The 2nd one will be that after every vibhag there will be 4 matras. So in each Vibhag there will be 4 matras and in total it becomes 4×4 i.e. 16 which are the matras of Teental.

Bols	dha dhin dhin dha	dha dhin dhin dha	dha tin tin ta	ta dhin dhin dha

The line which you see in the table is the Vibhag and in each Vibhag there are 4 matras and so when multiply 4 and 4, we get 16 which is the matras of Teental.

== Other Talas and Vibhags ==
In the following table is the information of the Vibhags, the matras of the tala and the division of how the matras are divided in each Vibhags.

Likewise, Teental has 4 Vibhags,

Name	Beats	Division	Vibhaga
Tintal (or Trital or Teental)	16	4+4+4+4	X 2 0 3
Jhoomra	14	3+4+3+4	X 2 0 3
Tilwada	16	4+4+4+4	X 2 0 3
Dhamar	14	5+2+3+4	X 2 0 3
Ektal and Chautal	12	2+2+2+2+2+2	X 0 2 0 3 4
Jhaptal	10	2+3+2+3	X 2 0 3
Keherwa	8	4+4	X 0
Rupak (Mughlai/Roopak)	7	3+2+2	X 2 3
Dadra	6	3+3	X 0
Adachoutal	14	2+2+2+2+2+2+2	X 2 0 3 0 4 0
Brahmtal	28	2+2+2+2+2+2+2+2+2+2+2+2+2+2	X 0 2 3 0 4 5 6 0 7 8 9 10 0
Dipchandi	14	3+4+3+4	X 2 0 3
Shikar	17	6+6+2+3	X 0 3 4
Savari	15	3+4+4+4	
Sultal	10	2+2+2+2+2	x 0 2 3 0
Teevra	7	3+2+2	x 2 3
Ussole e Fakhta	5	1+1+1+1+1	x 3
Farodast	14	3+4+3+4	X 2 0 3
Pancham Savari	15	3+4+4+4	x 2 0 3
Gaj jhampa	15	5+5+5	x 2 0 3

== See also ==
- Tala
- Teental
- Matra
