= Ektal =

Ektaal

Ektal or Ektaal is a tala in Indian music. It is commonly used in classical music like kheyal, and semi-classical forms like Rabindra Sangeet. In ektal the 12 matras are divided into 6 vibhags of two matras each. Ektal is played in Drut gatti ( fast speed ). This tala is mostly played by the use of tabla. One more tala similar to Ektal is Chowtal which is played with the use of Pakhavaj, Ektaal is the tabla counterpart of Chowtaal. Many beautiful Kaida are played in Ektal. But Ektal is mostly played for Vilambit (slow pace of any Tal) .

Basic information on tal Ektal :

Name - Ektal

Sum - 1st matra

Tali (claps) - 1, 5, 9, 11 matras

Khali (wave) - 3, 7 matras

Similar talas - Chowtal, Dadra, Garba (tal)

Related instruments - Tabla

Related to - Hindustani music

The form of Ektal is as follows:

clap, tap, wave, tap, clap, tap, wave, tap, clap, tap, clap, tap

It has a characteristic pattern of bols (theka) which goes as follows:

The Theka for Ektal
Dhin	Dhin	|	DhaGe	TiR KiTa	|
^{x}			^{0}
Tu	Na	|	Kat	Tin	|
^{2}			^{0}
DhaGe	TiR KiTa	|	Dhin	Na	|
^{3}			^{4}

It is very important in Indian Classical music and many compositions are based on it. The 'Tirkita' is played as 'Traka' in the drut gatti or fast laya.
