= Madhyalaya =

Madhya laya or Madhyalaya is a medium tempo of a rhythm in Indian classical music.

Medium tempo, a speed between 80 and 160 mātrās per minute. While Madhya laya is sometimes confused with Vilambit and vice versa, it is about two beats per second. According to some scholars like Subhajit Mandal, Madhya laya is visible in three phase:

Madhya + Vilambit, Madhya + Madhya, Madhya + Drut.

It could be said that what is characterized as Chhanda in first felt in Madhya tempo. Chhanda can be defined as generations of a definite, repetitive line of recognizable duration that bestows a definite length on the concerned tonal phase.

Madhya + Vilamvit = Known as ‘Dagur ki badhat’ consists of embellishments and chikari works.

Madhaya + Madhya = Also known as ‘Madhya Jod’ or ‘Barabar ki jod’ abundantly consists of musical embellishment known as ‘Gamaka’. In ‘tata’ instruments, fretwork is on the increase in the phase.

Madhya + Drut= The phase is also known as ‘Ladi ki jod’. It has a faster tempo than the Madhaya + Madhya.

Taals used in madhya laya include Jhaptal, Teental, Tilwada, Rupak and Keherwa.
