= Vishwanath Rao Ringe =

Pt. Acharya Vishwanath Rao Ringe
- Also known as: Tanarang
- Born: Vishwanath Rao Ringe; 6 December 1922
- Origin: Sagar, Madhya Pradesh, India
- Died: 10 December 2005 (aged 83)
- Genres: Hindustani classical music - Khyal and light forms
- Occupation: Hindustani classical vocalist
- Website: Pt. Vishwanath Rao Ringe

Late Pt. Acharya Vishwanath Rao Ringe 'Tanarang' (6 December 1922 – 10 December 2005) was a Hindustani classical music vocalist and composer. He belonged to Gwalior Gharana of Hindustani Classical Music. He composed more than 2000 bandishs in about 200 ragaas, for which he has been enlisted in Limca Book of Records. He wrote couple of books in past named 'Sangitanjali' and 'Swaranjali' and a recent book `Aacharya "Tanarang" ki Bandishen` was published.

Pt. Ringe was the disciple of late Pandit Krishnarao Pandit of Gwalior gharana. He started learning music from his childhood. He received rigorous and intensive training and full guidance as a performer Khyal Gayakee, in Gwalior Gharana style. In 1939, he established a music school named Bhartiya Sangeet Kala Mandir.

More than 2000 compositions in about 200 raagas, have been composed in various Talas. Viz... Ektal, Deepchandi, Tritala, Tilwada, Chanchar, Dadra, Keharva, Jhaptala, Ada-Choutal, Roopak etc. Pt Ringe had himself composed a Raga Hemashri, which he has Rendered in All India Radio (AIR) Programme.

His compositions include Bada Khyal, Chota Khyal, Chaturang, Tarana, Sadra, Sargam, Tillana, Sur Sagar. Sur Sagar is a unique composition, in which the lyrics are same as the notes.

Pt. Ringe died at the age of 83 at his residence in Indore, Madhya Pradesh in 2005.

== Awards and recognitions ==
Limca Book of Records for Most Compositions in Year 1999; Page # 222
Indo American Who's Who Vol II - for Most Compositions in Year 1999; Page # 493
Reference Asia Vol II for Most Compositions in year 1986; Page # 143
Indo European Who's Who Vol I for Most Compositions in year 1996; Page # 524
Biography International Vol III and Vol IV for Most Compositions in year 1992 - Page # 810
Sangeet Praveen from Shankar Gandharv Mahavidyalaya, Gwalior.
Sangeet Bhaskar from Shankar Gandharv Mahavidyalaya, Gwalior.
