= Yaman (raga) =

Hindustani raga

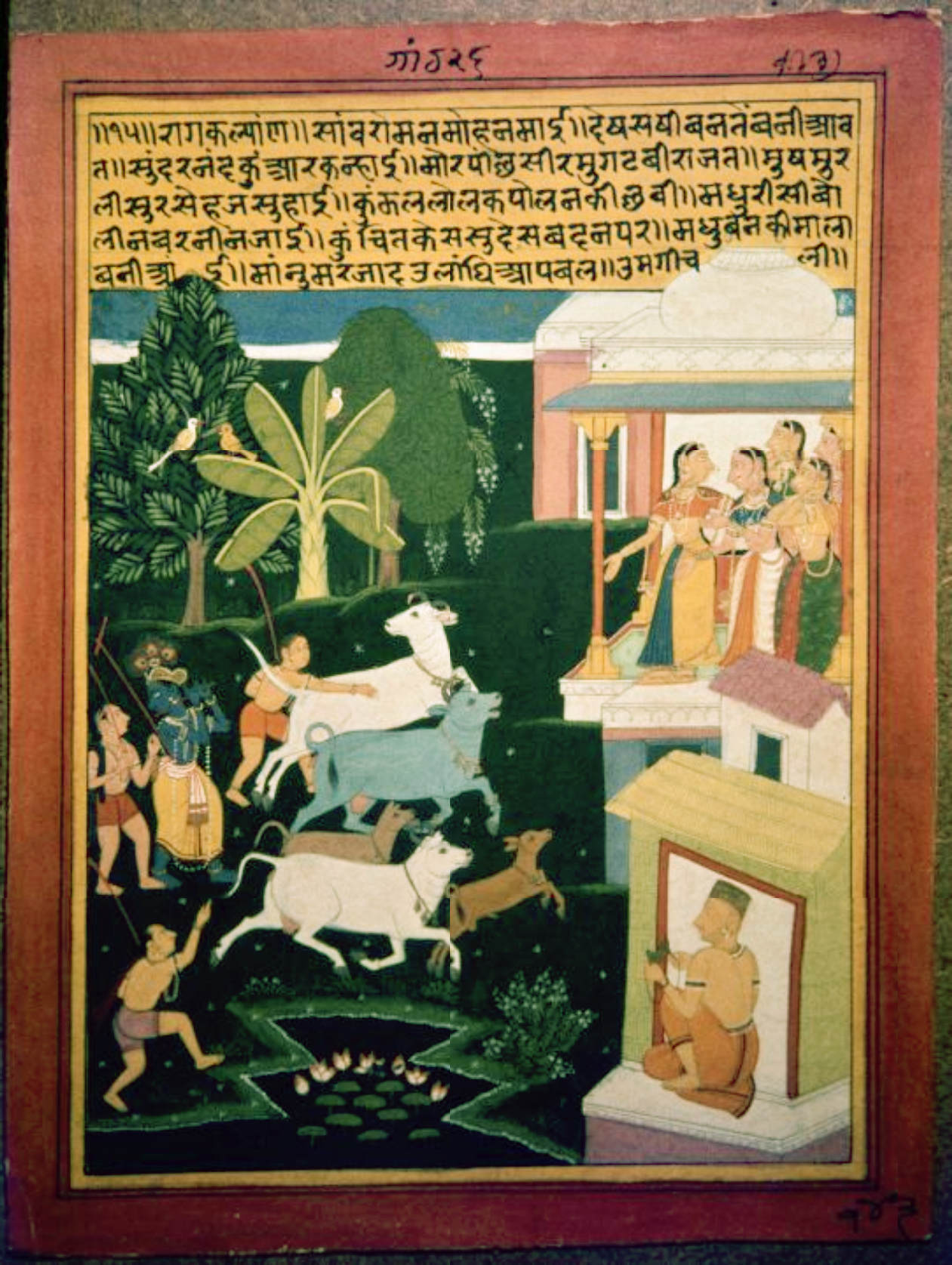
- Arohana: S R G m P D N S'
- Avarohana: S' N D P m G R S
- Pakad: .N R G R S P m G R S
- Vadi: G
- Samavadi: N
- Equivalent: Kalyani; Lydian mode
- Similar: Yaman Kalyan, Kalyani

Yaman (also known as Kalyan, Iman, Aiman, and Eman) is a heptatonic (sampurna) raga of the Hindustani classical music tradition, belonging to the Kalyan thaat. Regarded as one of the fundamental ragas of Hindustani music, it is traditionally performed during the first quarter of the night and is associated with a soothing and auspicious character.

Yaman uses all seven notes of the octave, with a sharp fourth (tivra Ma) as its only altered note. Its melodic identity is defined not simply by its scale, but by characteristic zigzag (vakra) movements and the treatment of individual notes, particularly in ascending passages. Ga is its principal note (vadi) and Ni its secondary note (samvadi). Although its scale is heptatonic, Sa and Pa are frequently omitted or treated as weak notes in ascending passages in contemporary practice.

Yaman is generally taught at an early stage of Hindustani musical training and is often regarded as the first raga taught to students. It is traditionally performed in the evening and is often associated with the beginning of concerts. The Karnatik classical music equivalent is Kalyani.

Sample music in Sitar
A 1 min 43-second sample of Sitar sound, playing Yaman

== Theory ==
Yaman is classified under the Kalyan thaat (parent scale) and is a heptatonic (sampurna) raga. It uses all seven notes, with tivra Ma as its only altered note. Its melodic identity is defined not simply by its scale, but by characteristic movements, including the treatment of Sa and Pa in ascending passages.

=== Mechanics ===
Vishnu Narayan Bhatkhande notes that Sa and Pa are often avoided in the ascent (arohana), and that many singers therefore classify Yaman in practice as pentatonic-heptatonic (audav-sampurna). The descent (avarohana) uses all seven notes.

Raga Yaman is distinct from Raga Yaman Kalyan, although the two are closely related. Yaman Kalyan employs both forms of Ma whereas Yaman only uses teevra ma. The shuddha Ma commonly occurs in the phrase G M G R S, which is sufficient to distinguish Yaman Kalyan from Yaman.

=== Arohana and avaroha ===
Raga Yaman utilizes all natural (shuddha) notes except for the fourth degree, which is played exclusively as teevra Ma.

- Arohana (ascent): S R G m P D N S'
- Avaroha (descent): S' N D P m G R S

=== Vadi and samavadi ===
The principal note (vadi) of Raga Yaman is Ga, and its secondary note (samvadi) is Ni. The vadi is the note given particular prominence in a raga, while the samvadi is a secondary prominent note traditionally related to the vadi by a perfect fourth or fifth. In Yaman, Ga and Ni form a perfect fifth.

- Vadi (principal): G
- Samvadi (secondary): N

=== Pakad ===
Yaman is characterized by a zigzag (vakra) melodic movement, with certain notes omitted or weakened in particular passages. In contemporary performance practice, Sa and Pa are frequently omitted or treated as weak notes in the ascent (arohana), although this convention was not necessarily followed in earlier practice. The ascent may also begin on the lower Ni or Dha.

- Pakad: .N R G R S P m G R S

=== Behavior ===
Yaman is regarded as one of the fundamental ragas of the Hindustani classical tradition. It is traditionally taught at an early stage of musical training, while its sampurna (heptatonic) structure and characteristic melodic movements provide considerable scope for improvisation. The Oxford Encyclopedia of the Music of India describes it as generally the first raga taught to students of Hindustani music and notes its vast scope for elaboration in alap and taan.

Yaman's melodic elaboration commonly extends through the lower (mandra) and middle (madhya) registers. Its ascent (arohana) may begin from the lower Ni or Dha, rather than from the tonic Sa. The raga's characteristic phrases and movements play an important role in establishing its melodic identity. The Raga Guide identifies Ga and Ni as the most important notes in the raga and illustrates ascending movements that specifically begin from the lower register.

=== Samay ===
Yaman is traditionally performed during the first quarter of the night. The Raga Guide gives its performance time as approximately 9 pm to midnight, while the Oxford Encyclopedia of the Music of India classifies it as a post-sunset raga and gives its traditional time as the first quarter of the night.

Yaman has traditionally been associated with the beginning of evening concerts and is regarded as a soothing, auspicious raga. It is typically performed in the evening, often at the beginning of a concert or theatrical performance.

=== Rasa ===
Historical sources associate Yaman with a range of emotional and iconographical descriptions. In the ragamala tradition, Meshakarna's 16th-century description depicts Yaman as a lord dressed in white garments and a pearl necklace, seated on a lion throne beneath a royal umbrella. Other historical sources give different personifications: the Raga-Sagara associates Yaman with the goddess Yamuna, while the Raga-Kalpadruma describes a red, martial figure carrying a sword onto a battlefield.

Kalyan is also associated with love in some historical descriptions. A ragamala description reproduced in The Raga Guide identifies Yaman with Kamdeva, the god of love, and describes him as having a voice like a cuckoo. These associations provide historical evidence for an association between Yaman and romantic expression, although they should not be treated as a fixed or exclusive emotional character of Yaman. The emotional interpretation of a raga may vary with its musical treatment and performance context.

=== Yaman and Yaman-Kalyan ===
The names Yaman and Kalyan are treated as synonyms by some authorities, with Kalyan described as the Indian (Sanskrit) name and Yaman as the Persian name. Other musicologists distinguish between Yaman and Kalyan according to their melodic treatment.

The raga Yaman-Kalyan is distinguished from Yaman by the occasional use of shuddha Ma alongside the tivra Ma characteristic of Yaman. When shuddha Ma is added in a concluding figure leading to Sa, the raga is known as Yaman-Kalyan, while also observing that some musicians do not recognize Yaman-Kalyan as an independent raga. In Yaman-Kalyan, a characteristic use of shuddha Ma between two Gandhara (Ga) notes, as in the phrase Ga Ma Ga Re Sa, is common.

Experts disagree on the impact of shuddha Ma on the raga's classification. Vishnu Narayan Bhatkhande stated that when shuddha Ma is used sparingly in Yaman, it is called Yaman-Kalyan. Govindrao Tembe stated that the introduction of the phrase Ga Ma Ga Re, which contains shuddha Ma, is sufficient to convert Yaman into Yaman-Kalyan. Manik-bua Thakurdas identified Re, Pa, and Dha as important notes (svaras) related to Yaman-Kalyan, while Ga, Ni, and tivra Ma characterize it as purely Yaman.

== Historical information ==
The historical development of Yaman is difficult to trace as a continuous tradition because the names Iman, Yaman, and Kalyan have not always referred to the same musical form. Many modern musicologists have compared Yaman with ancient Indian musical structures, but these comparisons do not establish an uninterrupted historical lineage.

The name Iman is documented in Locana Kavi's Raga-tarangini which dates back to the late 14th or early 15th century. Locana lists Iman among twelve basic or parent melodies (samstitiyah) and places Shuddha-Kalyana, along with Puriya-Kalyana and Jayat-Kalyana, among its derivative (janya) ragas. In this classification, Iman and Kalyana were related but not interchangeable names for the same raga.

By the late 16th century, sources provide more explicit evidence of a relationship between Yaman and Kalyan. Pundarik Vitthala's Ragamanjari includes Yaman among melodies designated as melodies (parada) received from elsewhere, and a passage in his Shadraga-chandrodaya states, "Yaman is sung in Kalyan". Gangoly believes that Yaman and Kalyan were not identical, but were based on the same scale. Therefore, the source provides some evidence for an association between the Persian-associated name Yaman and the Indian Kalyan tradition, rather than establishing that the two names were exact synonyms.

The relationship between the names continued to vary among different theoretical systems in the 17th century. In Hrdayanarayana Deva's Hrdaya-kautuka (1646), Iman is treated as a parent scale (samsthanam), with Shuddha-Kalyana and other Kalyan-named melodies among its derivatives. Somanatha's Raga-vivodha (1609) includes Kalyana among its principal parent scales (melas).

The musical form associated with the name also appears to have changed. M. R. Gautam identifies historical examples of audava (pentatonic) compositions associated with Kalyan/Yaman and contrasts them with the modern sampurna (heptatonic) form of Yaman. He argues that the modern form cannot simply be derived from these earlier pentatonic examples by adding or removing individual notes without a corresponding change in their overall melodic character. This suggests that the modern Yaman should not automatically be projected backward onto every historical composition or theoretical description bearing the name.

== Compositions ==
A number of traditional bandishes, or compositions, in Raga Yaman have been documented by musicologists and performers. Vishnu Narayan Bhatkhande collected several Yaman compositions in different tempo (laya) and rhythmic cycle (tala) settings. The Oxford Encyclopaedia of the Music of India notes the following compositions associated with the raga:

Bandish	Laya	Tala
Eri ali piya bin	Madhya	Teental
Piyaki nazariya jadu bhari	Madhya	Teental
Langaratura kaji na chhuvo	Madhya	Teental
Sumarana karu mai to	Vilambit	Teental
Kesara ghorake anga lagaoor	-	Dhamar
Sughar banari tero bhagan mein	Drut	Teental
Terohi dhyan dharata	Dhrupad	Chautal

=== Film Songs ===
Following is the list of film songs based on Yaman.

Song	Movie	Composer	Singer
Jiya Le Gayo Ji Mora	Anpadh	Madan Mohan	Lata Mangeshkar
Rasik Balma	Chori Chori	Shankar–Jaikishan	Lata Mangeshkar
Chandan Sa Badan	Saraswatichandra	Kalyanji–Anandji	Lata Mangeshkar, Mukesh
Zindagi Bhar Nahi Bhulegi	Barsaat Ki Raat	Roshan	Lata Mangeshkar, Mohammed Rafi
Jab Deep Jale Aana	Chitchor	Ravindra Jain	Hemlata (singer), K. J. Yesudas
Ehsan Tera Hoga Mujhpar	Junglee	Shankar–Jaikishan	Lata Mangeshkar, Mohammed Rafi
Kabhi Kabhi Mere Dil Mein	Kabhi Kabhie	Khayyam	Lata Mangeshkar, Mukesh
Beeti Na Beetayi Raina	Parichay	R.D.Burman	Lata Mangeshkar, Bhupinder Singh
Hothon Se Chulo Tum	Prem Geet	Jagjit Singh	Jagjit Singh
Abhi Na Jao Chhodakar	Hum Dono	Jaidev	Asha Bhosle, Mohammed Rafi

== Literature ==
Bor, Joep (1997), The Raga Guide, Charlottesville, Virginia: Nimbus Records.
Kaufmann, Walter (1968), The Ragas of North India, Calcutta: Oxford and IBH Publishing Company.
Bagchee, Sandeep (1998), Nād, Understanding Rāga Music, Mumbai: Eshwar (Business Publications Inc.).
Bhatt, Balvantray (1964–1974), Bhāvaranga, Varanasi: Motilal Barnasidas.
Gandharva, Kumar (1965), Anūparāgavilāsa, Bombay: Mauj Prakashan.
Patwardhan, Vinayak Rao (1961–74), Rāga Vijñāna, Poona: Sangeet Gaurav Granthamala.
Srivastava, Harichandra (1973–79), Rāga Paricaya, Allahabad: SangeetSadan Prakashan.
Telang, Gokulanand; Bhartendu, Banwari Lal (1962), Sangīta Rāga Aṣṭachāpa, Hathras: Sangeet Karyalaya.
Thakar, Vasant Vaman, Sangīta Rāga Darśana, Prayag: Gandharva Mahavidyalaya Mandal Prakashan.
Rao, B. Subba (1964–66), Raganidhi, Madras: Music Academy.
Bhatt, Jivanlal (1950), Sangeet Parichay, Delhi: Atmaram & Sons.
