= Rupak Tala =

Tala in Hindustani music

Rupak Tala (rupak taal) or also known as Roopak Taal is a popular tala in Hindustani music that is common in Bhajans and Geets. It has seven matras (beats) in three vibhags (divisions). Unlike the popular Tintal, the vibhags of Rupak Tala are not of equal length. Also, both the khali and sam of Rupak Tala fall on the first matra.

== Aavartan ==
The aavaratan (cycle) of Rupak Tala has three vibhags (divisions). The first vibhag has three matras and both the second and third vibhags have two matras. Sam is on the first matra of the first vibhag. The aavaratan of Rupak Taal may be written as follows:

1	2	3	4	5	6	7
Tin Tin Na			Dhin Na		Dhin Na	

== Examples ==
There are numerous examples of Rupak Tala that differ based upon the instrument used. The following examples apply for the tabla.

=== Theka ===
The most common theka for Rupak tala contains the bols 'Tin', 'Na', and 'Dhin' (the transliteration of these bols may differ quite a lot among individuals). This theka is composed in the following manner

Tin Tin Na X| Dhin Na 2| Dhin Na 3

=== Prakar ===
Prakars are fairly open to the individual performer's flair. That being said, however, the following is an example of three common Rupak Tala prakars.

Tin Tin Na | Dhin NaNa | Dhin NaNa

Tin Tin Na | Dha Dha Tirkit | Dha Dha Tirkit

Tin Tin Nana | Dhirkt NaNa | Dhirkt NaNa

Tin Tin Nana | Dhirkt tktk | Dhirkt tktk

=== Tihai ===
A tihai for Rupak Tala must begin on either the third or the sixth matra to end on sam. The following is an example of a simple tihai for Rupak Tala that begins on matra three.

X X Tr | kt Tr | kt Tr
Da X X | X X | X X
