= Radhavallabh Chaturvedi =

Indian Classical Singer and Composer (1917 – 1974)

Pandit Radhavallabh Chaturvedi
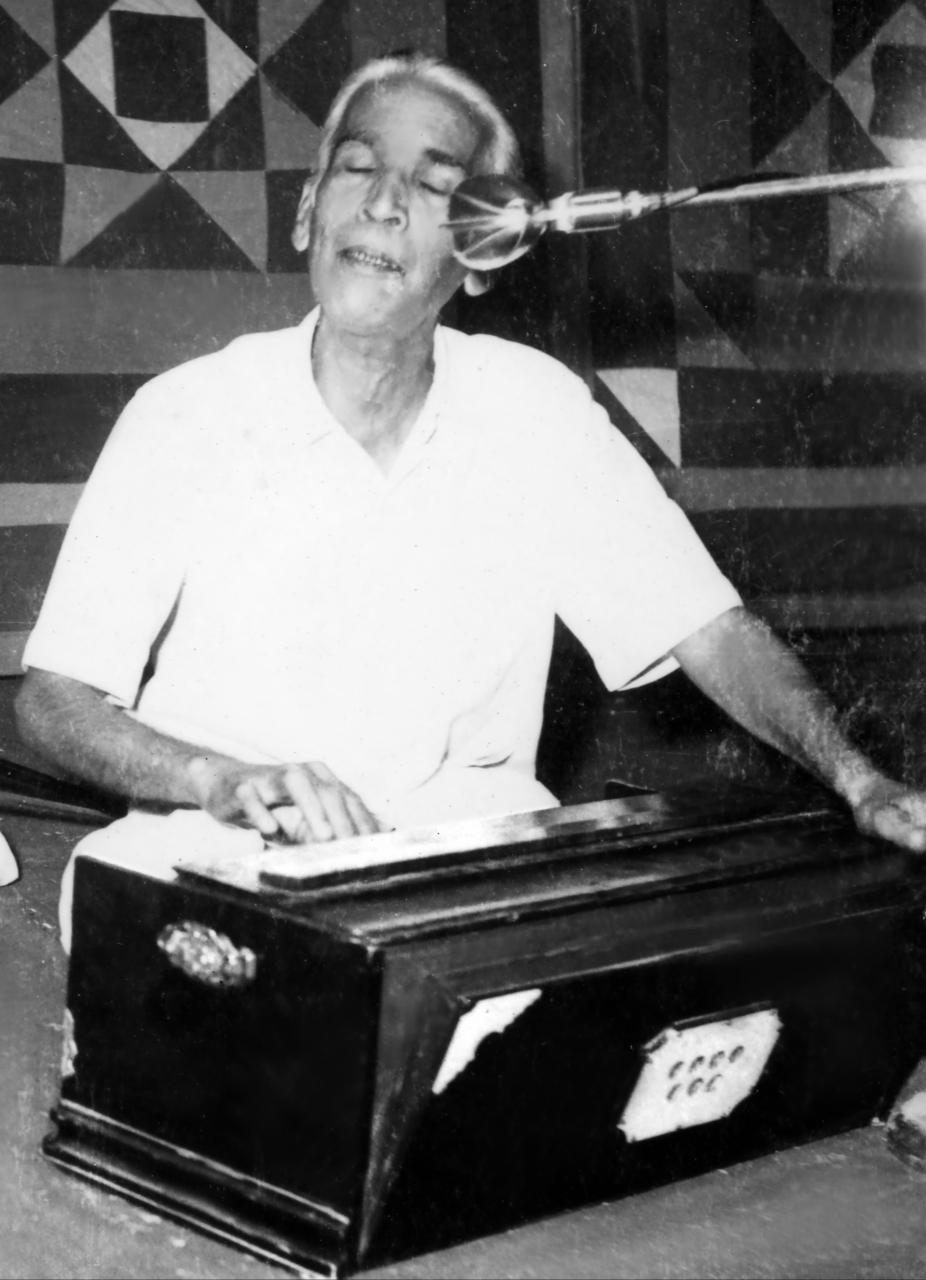
- Pandit Radhavallabh Chaturvedi in 1967 during a stage performance

Background information
- Born: 1917; Moradabad, India
- Died: 1974 (aged 56–57)
- Genres: khyal, Dadra, thumri, Dhrupad, Tappa, Tarana
- Occupations: Singer, composer
- Years active: 1942 – 1974
- Website: panditradhavallabhchaturvedi.com

Pandit Radhavallabh Chaturvedi (12 January 1917 – 10 June 1974) was an Indian singer, music composer of Hindustani classical music, scholar and conservator. His repertoire includes the genres of khyal, Dadra, thumri, Dhrupad, Tappa and Tarana.

== Early life and career ==
Pandit Radhavallabh Chaturvedi was born in 1917 in Moradabad, Uttar Pradesh, India. At the age of 18, he left his home and came to Lucknow to learn music and completed his music education from Bhatkhande Sangeet Mahavidyalaya in 1936. He dedicated his life for conservation of local songs in Braj, Bhojpuri, Awadhi and Bundeli dialects. He was married in 1930 with Rambha Chaturvedi, they have one daughter Neelam Chaturvedi, who is former deputy director of program on Doordarshan.

In 1942, as a music composer, he joined All India Radio in Lucknow and worked there till 1974. He composed about 5000 rare folk songs at Akashvani studio and made notations for each. He became the savior of folk music of Uttar Pradesh, India.

His book "Unchi Atariya Rang Bhari" consists of 106 compositions of folk songs like Sariya, Sohar, Janeu, Tona, Jhoola, Kajri, Chaiti, Rasiya, Jhoomar, Dhamaar, Devigeet etc.

== In popular culture ==
Bhajan Samraat Anup Jalota's mother was a student of pandit Radhavallabh Chaturvedi. In 2017, on his birth centenary, Indian classical singer Shubha Mudgal paid tribute to Pandit Radhavallabh Chaturvedi by organizing a program in the India Habitat Centre titled "khazane lok sangeet ke". He dedicated his life to the preservation and promotion of the Indian traditional folk music.

In 2017, Uttar Pradesh Sangeet Natak Akademi dedicated its magazine "Chayanat" to Pandit Radhavallabh Chaturvedi and organised an event titled Awadh Sandhya.

== Bibliography ==
- Sa Re Ga Ma, re-published by Sangeet Natak Akademi, 2019, p: 148, ISBN 9788193165799
- "Unchi Atariya Rang Bhari" a collection of 106 folk songs, re-published by Sangeet Natak Akademi, 2018, ISBN 9788193165782
