= Mogal Tamsa =

Traditional theatrical form of Odisha, India

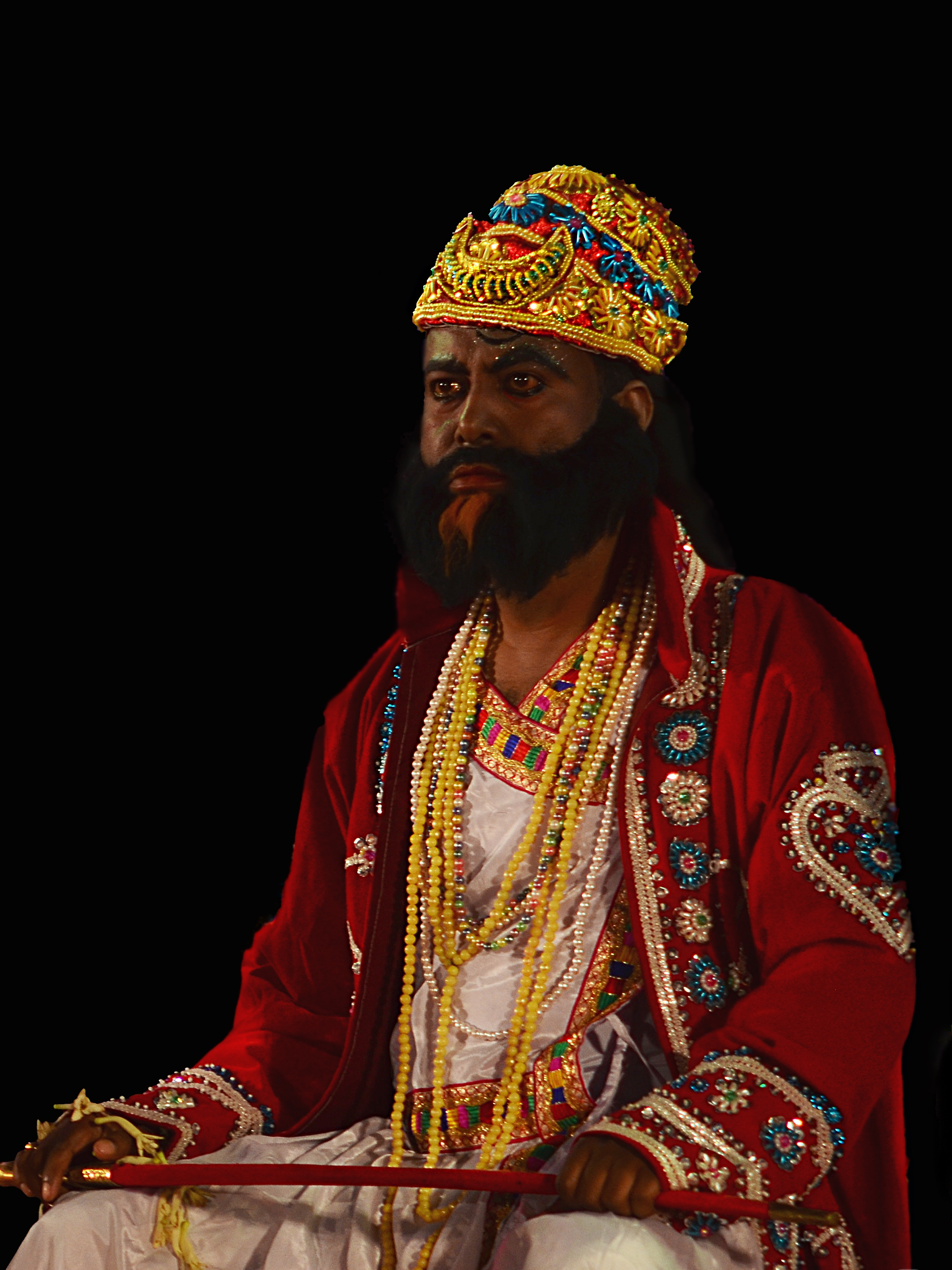
- Mirza Sahib, a character in Mogal Tamsa
- Medium: Song, drama and dialogue
- Originating culture: Odia
- Originating era: Mughal period

Mogal Tamsa is a traditional theatrical form practiced in Bhadrak district of Odisha, India. It developed as a form of folk theatre intended to promote harmony between Hindu and Muslim communities.

== History ==
Mogal Tamsa emerged in the early 18th century, when Odisha was under the administration of Bengal. At the time, Murshid Quli Khan was the ruler of Bengal, and his son-in-law served as the Naib Nazim, the highest administrative authority in Odisha. Murshid Quli Khan is described as a comparatively liberal ruler who discontinued several policies directed against Hindus that had been introduced during the reign of Aurangzeb. During his administration, efforts were made to promote social harmony between Hindu and Muslim communities. Mogal Tamsa was one such cultural initiative.

Banshiballabh Goswami is credited with conceiving and staging the theatrical form. According to accounts preserved in the tradition, Goswami wrote Mogal Tamsa in 1728. He staged the plays and preserved their texts in palm-leaf manuscripts.

== Characteristics ==
Mogal Tamsa is a humorous and entertainment-oriented form of folk theatre. One of its distinctive features is the presentation of both Hindu and Muslim religious traditions, while also satirizing the social prestige and lifestyle of the feudal elite.

The performances traditionally include characters such as Hindu ascetics, Muslim fakirs, Mirza Sahib, and rural Odia people. The form combines elements of different religious and cultural traditions and also demonstrates considerable linguistic diversity. In addition to Odia, performances may use Persian, Urdu, Arabic, Bengali, and Sanskrit.

The language used by a character is not necessarily determined by the character's social or religious identity. For example, a servant may speak Sanskrit, a Muslim fakir may sing a hymn in praise of Shiva, and Mirza Sahib, despite representing an aristocratic character, may speak in both Persian and Odia.

A number of musical instruments are used in Mogal Tamsa performances, including the violin, pakhawaj, jodi-tarang, ghini, harmonium, and tabla.

== Revival ==
A podcast with Gaurang Chandra Barik regarding the history and revival of Mogal Tamsa

The theatrical tradition, which originated in the first half of the 18th century, gradually declined over time. In 1966, cultural researcher Krushnacharan Behera, while teaching at Bhadrak College, documented the tradition by recording dialogues remembered by Mogal Tamsa performers. He also had palm-leaf manuscripts transcribed onto paper. These efforts helped preserve and revive a folk-art tradition that was then approximately 250 years old.
