= Tihai =

Tihai (pronounced ti-'ha-yi) is a polyrhythmic technique found in Indian classical music, and often used to conclude a piece. Tihais can be either sung or played on an instrument. Tihais are sometimes used to distort the listeners’ perception of time, only to reveal the consistent underlying cycle at the sam.

== Definition ==
Tihai is the repetition of specific group of BOL or BEATS by three times.

=== Usage ===
Typically, a tihai is used as a rhythmic cadence, i.e., a rhythmic variation that marks the end of a melody or rhythmic composition, creating a transition to another section of the music.

=== Structure ===
The basic internal format of the tihai is three equal repetitions of a rhythmic pattern (or rhythmo-melodic pattern), interspersed with 2 (usually) equal rests.

The ending point of the tihai is calculated to fall on a significant point in the rhythmic cycle (called tala), most often the first beat (called sum and pronounced "some"). The other most common ending point of a tihai is the beginning of the gat or bandish, which is often found several beats before the sum.

If the three groupings are played with two groupings of rests, which are equally long, then the tihai is called Dumdaar.

Otherwise, if there are no rests between the three groupings, then the tihai is called Bedumdaar (or for short, Bedum).

Sometimes, a pattern is played on the tabla that is almost identical to a tihai, except for the fact that it ends on the beat just before the sum. Such patterns are known as anagat.

== Examples ==
• If the phrase is 16 beats long,
like in the rhythmic cycle called Teental,
the outline of a Anagat Tihai might look like 4 2 4 2 4.

Each "4" represents a rhythmic pattern that is 4 beats long,
and each "2" represents a rest that is 2 beats long.
(4+2+4+2+4 = 6+6+4 = 12+4 = 16).

The start of the next phrase fall exactly on the downbeat.

• Another example of Anagat Tihai in a 16 beat phrase might be 2 5 2 5 2 :
Two beats of rhythm with 5 beats of rest between them.
(2+5+2+5+2 = 7+7+2 = 14+2 = 16).

• In a '10 beat taal, such as jhaptaal, a Tihai may be structured as 6 1 6 1 6 1 (this last beat falling on the sum).
(6+1+6+1+6+1 = 7+7+7 = 21 = 10x2 + 1).

More complicated patterns may be formulated.

For example, for the 16 beat Teentaal, a Tihai of Tihais may be formed. This is known as the Chakradhar Tihai.

One structure of Chakradhar Tihai may be implemented as the following, where the last 1 lands on the Sum.

4 1 1 1 4 1 1 1 4 1 1 1 Rest
4 1 1 1 4 1 1 1 4 1 1 1 Rest
4 1 1 1 4 1 1 1 4 1 1 1

[(4+1+1+1)x3x3]+1+1 = (7x3x3)+2 = (21x3)+2 = 63+2 = 65 = 64+1 = (16x4)+1

Following is a possible rhythmic composition based this structure (written in bols syllables).

dhatirakita takatirakita dhatirakita tak'tirakita dha dha dha
dhatirakita takatirakita dhatirakita takatirakita dha dha dha
dhatirakita takatirakita dhatirakita takatirakita dha dha dha
'''S''' ''(Silent, Rest)''
dhatirakita takatirakita dhatirakita tak'tirakita dha dha dha
dhatirakita takatirakita dhatirakita takatirakita dha dha dha
dhatirakita takatirakita dhatirakita takatirakita dha dha dha
'''S''' ''(Silent, Rest)''
dhatirakita takatirakita dhatirakita takatirakita dha dha dha
dhatirakita takatirakita dhatirakita takatirakita dha dha dha 
dhatirakita takatirakita dhatirakita takatirakita dha dha dha.

The last dha is the Sum.

== See also ==
- Tala (music)
