= Jhumra =

Jhumra may refer to:

- Jhumra or Jhoomra a Hindustani music tala
- Chak Jhumra, Chak Jhumra is a town and tehsil near the city of Faisalabad, Punjab, Pakistan
