= Dadra =

Rhythmic cycle in Hindustani classical music

Dadra is associated with the Hindustani classical music of the Indian subcontinent.

== Dadra tala ==
This is a Hindustani classical tala (rhythmic cycle), consisting of six beats in two equal divisions of three. The most commonly accepted theka or basic pattern for this tala is dha tin tin, ta dhin dhin. There is a higher emphasis laid on the first swar in comparison the following two, that is, dha - higher emphasis following tin tin and again a higher emphasis on ta following dhin dhin.

=== Theka of Dadra Tala ===
मात्रा भाग : 3-3.
धा धिं ना - धा तीं ना
It has a characteristic pattern of bols (theka).

The Theka flundor Dadra
dha	dhin	na	|	dha	tin	na	|
^{x}				^{0}

This can also be shown using the following figure

Taal signs	X			0		
Maatra	1	2	3	4	5	6
Bols	dha	tin	tin	ta	dhin	dhin

== Dadra (genre) ==
In this context dadra is a light classical vocal form in Hindustani classical music, mostly performed in Agra and in Bundelkhand region. It was originally accompanied by dadra tala (from where the term for the genre was borrowed), but later dadra compositions are often found in other light talas (such as keherwa).

The peculiarity of Dadra genre is that the Sthayi is in Braj Bhasha while the Antara is sometimes in Urdu. It is one of the illustrations of how cultures have amalgamated and coexisted in Indian classical music.

There have been some Bollywood songs as well based on the same for instance Madan Mohan composition -Lag Jaa Gale, a song from the movie Woh Kaun Thi.

== See also ==
- Hindustani classical music
