= Pakhavaj =

Two-headed drum

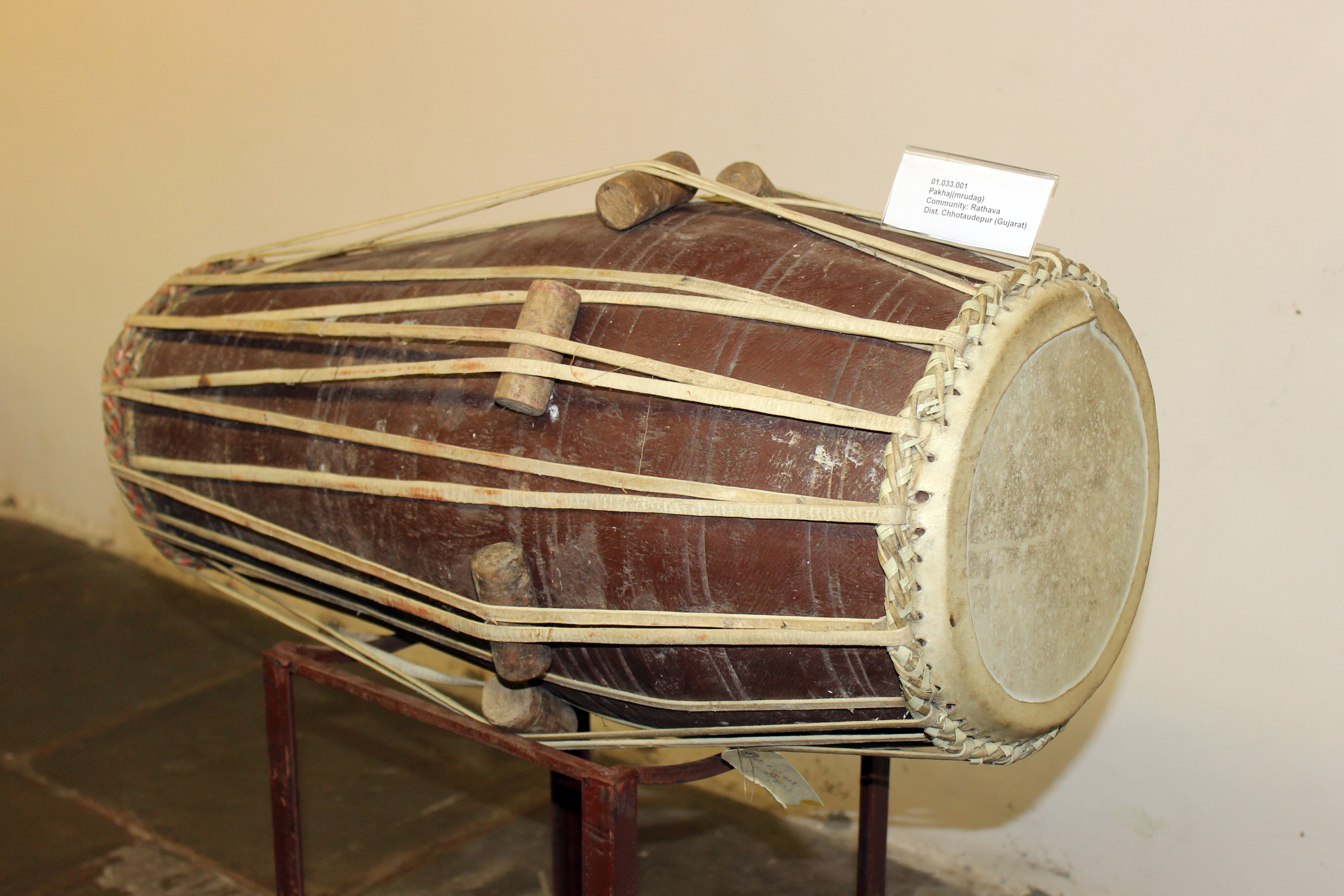

Percussion instrument

Related instruments
- Mridangam, khol, tabla, kendang, jori (instrument)

More articles or information
- Hindustani music

The pakhavaj or pakhawaj is a barrel-shaped, two-headed drum, originating from the Indian subcontinent, kendang of Maritime Southeast Asia and other Indian double-headed drums. Its older forms were made with clay.

It is the percussion instrument most commonly used in the dhrupad style of Indian classical music and less often used as a rhythm accompaniment for various other sub-forms of music and dance performances (e.g. kathak, odissi, marathi). It has a low, mellow tone that is quite rich in harmonics. The sides of the pakhawaj are made with animal skin (often goat skin). The pakhavaj players place the instrument horizontally in front of themselves as they sit on the floor with legs crossed. The players may sometimes place a cushion under the narrower treble face to lift it slightly. A right-handed person places the larger bass-skin on the left side and the treble skin on the right. The bass face tends to be smeared with some fresh wheat dough which acts as the kiran and gives a vivid bass sound to the pakhavaj.

The tuning of Pakhavaj is similar to that of the tabla – with the wooden wedges placed under the tautening straps. Due to the varied thickness of the skin that covers the treble face, the treble face can produce at least two tones that are a semitone apart. For example, if hitting the centre (the bol दिन din) is tuned to produce the note C then hitting closer to the edge (with the bol ता for example) could produce the note C#. The fine tuning can be done with the woven outer ring (गजरा – gajra) which is an extension of the skin that the face is made of. It is only on the bass skin where a freshly made batter (or dough) of (wheat) flour and water is applied to provide enhance the low-pitched sound. While the options to use a polymer-based substitute are available but are not commonly used.

== Etymology ==
The word पखावज – pakhāvaja or pakhavāja is of Prakrit origin, whose equivalent in Sanskrit is पक्षवाद्य pakṣavādya – where it is formed with the words पक्ष pakṣa ("a side"), and वाद्य vādya ("a musical instrument"). Telugu pakkavāyidyam (పక్క వాయిద్యం), Tamil pakkavadyam and Kannada pakkavādya (ಪಕ್ಕವಾದ್ಯ) are cognates. It is said that during the 14th century, the great mridangists experimented with the materials used in mridang construction and finally started using wood for the main body as opposed to the original clay. Thus, a new name pakhavaj emerged, whilst the older name, mridang was still used.

== Technique ==
As with the tabla, the pakhavaj rhythms (or tala) are taught by a series of mnemonic syllables known as bol. The playing technique varies from that of tabla in many aspects. Most remarkably, the artist hits the bass face – which would be the left side of pakhavaj for a right-handed person – with the whole palm instead of with the finger tips as is done with a tabla. The treble face – which would be the right side of the pakhavaj for a right-handed person – is played with varied configurations of the fingers to produce different bols according to a given rhythm, whereas the traditional mode is to use the whole hand in order to produce the pure and perfect sound, called 'chanti'.

In traditional pakhavaj styles a student would learn a number of different strokes which produce a specific sound. These are remembered and practised with corresponding syllables i.e. mnemonics. This memorisation is often referred to as पढ़न्त (paḍhanta) in Hindi. While the pakhavaj mnemonics share some similarity with the tabla mnemonics, the interpretation of the same mnemonics may be different in pakhavaj and also vary according to the respective gharana – e.g. the Nana Panse gharana and the Nathdwara gharana.

Indian classical music tradition encourages the percussionist to verbally recite the rhythm as expressed in these mnemonics. Unlike the Konnakol notation(s) in Carnatic classical music, however, such recitals are hardly presented as independent performances. In the Hindustani classical traditions, the recitals are instead presented in a conversational manner to the audience before demonstrating the composition on the instrument. As the percussionists are expected to improvise their own rhythms, having a good knowledge of mnemonics helps finding a common ground with the co-performing musician – a singer or an instrumentalist whom the percussionist accompanies. Since the percussionist is required to play the rhythm quite fast at times (i.e. the drut laya) – these mnemonics are designed to assist fast recital by the percussionist – often with alternative names to allow the composition to be easy on the tongue.

=== Mnemonics ===
The following are some mnemonics that are popular.

1. दिन (din) – This sound is made by gently hitting the centre of the treble face with all fingers except the thumb and leaving the hand quickly enough to allow a resonating sound. The resonant sound thus produced often serves as a bridge to the next mnemonic in the rhythm. The bol is also referred to as धुम.
2. ता (ta) – This sound is made by waving the hand from down to up while brushing the top of the treble face with the part of the hand slightly below the little finger. This produces a resonating sound which often serves as the last mnemonic of the rhythm's sub-cycle.
3. घे (ghe) – This sound is made by hitting the bass part with all fingers except the thumb closed.
4. धा (dha) – This is a compound mnemonic composed of घे and ता and is thus played with both hands simultaneously on the pakhavaj.
5. तिट (tiTa) – This sound is produced on the treble face in two parts. Both parts are muted hits and are produced by leaving the hand on the face to suppress the resonance that would have been caused if the hand were to quickly hit the face (i.e. taken away immediately). The first part is a muted hit with the middle, ring and little finger and the second part is a muted hit with just the index finger. The bol can also be referred to as किट in some compositions.
6. क (ka) – This sound is produced on the bass face with a muted hit with all fingers of the hand.
7. न (n) – This is a muted sound made on the treble face with the middle and ring fingers.
8. ना (na) – This is similar to the equivalent sound in tabla. The ring finger needs to be on the border separating the syahi (black center of the treble face) while the index finger is used hit the edge and lifted immediately to produce a resonating tone (higher than that of the center).
9. तिन (tin) – This sound is similar to ना(na) but the index finger is used to hit the मैदान (maidan) – the area between the outermost ring and the inner circle (syahi).
10. कत (kata) – This is a compound sound produced made by playing क(ka) and ता (ta) in succession (not simultaneously like in धा – dha).
11. गन (gan) – This is a compound sound produced made by playing क(ka) and न (n) in succession.
12. गदि (gadi) – This is a compound sound produced made by playing क(ka) and दिन (din) in succession.

Alternative names are sometimes used for some of the mnemonics (bol) in order to assist fast recital. For example, घे (ghe) could also be pronounced थुन् (thun) and तिट (tiTa) could also be pronounced as किट(kiTa).

=== Rhythms or tala ===
A basic exercise that a beginner is expected to learn is playing a theka (pattern) in a particular tala or rhythmic cycle. For example, the simple bols for chautal or chartal (unrelated to chowtal – the folksong style from the Bhojpuri-speaking region) in 12 beats are as follows:

|धा धा | दिन ता | तिट धा | दिन ता

| तिट कत | गदि गन |

| dha dha | din ta || tiTa dha | din ta

| tiTa kata | gadi gana |

Learners typically advance to practising relas (which are compositions performed at high tempo/laya). In the Hindustani system, the basic theka e.g. for chowtal above remains as a pulse while elaborations or vistāra (विस्तार) continue with higher tempos. For example, a rela that corresponds to the above chowtal is the following

| धा दिन धा किट तकिट तकाकिट । तक तक धुम किट तकिट तकाकिट । तक तक धुम किट तक तक धुम किट । तक तक धुम किट तकिट तकाकिट

। तक धुम किट तक गदि गन धा किट । तक गदि गन धा किट तक गदि गन ।

| dhā dina dhā kiṭa takiṭa takākiṭa । taka taka dhuma kiṭa takiṭa takākiṭa । taka taka dhuma kiṭa taka taka dhuma kiṭa । taka taka dhuma kiṭa takiṭa takākiṭa

। taka dhuma kiṭa taka gadi gana dhā kiṭa । taka gadi gana dhā kiṭa taka gadi gana ।

Here, four bols correspond to every bol of the theka. Players often start the performance with the theka – playing just the one bol at every pulse (particularly when not performing as accompaniments to singing or instrumental pieces) and then go on to present their compositions with higher or lower speeds. Increasing the speed(tempo) up or down is acceptable in Indian classical music – which has more temporal rather than harmonic complexity (unlike the Western system of music).

Another tala used often in compositions is Dhamaar tala(14 beats) – which follows the scheme of 3-2-2-3-4 and sometimes 3-2-2-3-2-2 – varying according to the particular correspondence. The theka for Dhamara tala is |Ka dhi ta | dhi ta| dha S |Ga di na | di na ta S | Another impressive tala is Sultala(10 beats) or Sur-fank tala following the scheme of 2-2-2-2-2 notable by the theka of | Dha kete | Nak Dhi | Ghere Nak | Gad Di | Ghere Nak |

A few other talas used in the pakhavaj are the Therwa (7 beats/3-2-2) tala, Matta tala(9 beats/4-2-3 and sometimes 4-1-4), Teentala (16 beats/4-4-4-4) and Pancham Sawari(15 beats/3-4-4-4). These are not as common.

== Notable traditions ==
Nana Panse, Nathdwara and Kudai Singh may be the primary surviving gharanas of pakhawaj but there are at least 11 styles that can be traced in recent history – Jaawli, Mathura, Punjab, Kudau Singh, Nana Saheb Panse, Naathdwara, Bishnupur, Gurav parampara, Mangalvedhekar, Gwalior, Raigarh, Gujarat, Jaipur and Jodhpur.

== See also ==
- Mridangam
- Dhol
- Khol
