= Antara (music) =

Antarā is the equivalent of a verse in Hindustani classical music.

In Hindustani classical music, the fixed (dhrupad/bandish) section is in four parts of which only the first two are performed regularly: Sthāyī (pallavi in Carnatic music) - the first line of the Sthāyī serves as a cadence (music), while the section itself serves as a base for the singer returns to the Sthāyī time and again after each part; Antarā (Anupallavi in Carnatic music) - the intermediate part sung in a high register focusing on the tar shadja, with a good deal of text manipulation and repeated forays into sthāyī; the third section Sanchari (charanam in Carnatic music) - created by the division of the Abhoga and it remains a free-moving section; the fourth and concluding section Abhoga (Pallavi in Carnatic music because this section is often replaced by the Sthāyī) includes notes from all three registers, and in present-day performances, may well be sung with the Sanchari, if these two sections are included.

== See also ==
- Sthayi
