= Sthayi =

Initial phrase or line of a Hindustani musical composition

Sthayi or Asthaayi is an initial phrase or line of a fixed, melodic composition in Hindustani music. It is a way of having the parts of a composition. The Sthayi part of a Dhrupad is the first of four stanzas and uses the middle octave's first tetrachord and the lower octave notes.

Sthayi means an octave.

== See also ==
- Antara (music)
