= Jhaptal =

Non-symmetrical tala of Hindustani classical music

Jhaptal (Hindi: झपताल) is a tala used in Hindustani music. It presents quite a different rhythmical structure from teental in that it is not symmetrical. It is used in madhyalay (medium-tempo) khyal.

== Arrangement ==
Jhaptal is a 10-beat pattern used in raga exposition. It has ten beats in four divisions (vibhag), of 2-3-2-3, the third of which is the khali, or open division. To follow the tal the audience clap on the appropriate beat, which in jhaptal is beats 1, 3 and 8 (the first beat in each full division). A wave of the hand indicates beat 6, the first beat of the khali section.

Series of Claps and Waves: clap, 2, clap, 2, 3, wave, 2, clap, 2, 3

== Theka ==
There are 4 vibhags: The split for Jhaptaal : 2 / 3 / 2 / 3

Theka:

x Dhi Na | 2 Dhi Dhi Na |0 Tin Na | 3Dhi Dhi Na |
In Devanagari : धी ना - धी धी ना -- ती ना - धी धी ना .
It has a characteristic pattern of bols (theka).

Note the bols used for the first beat of each division: Dhi, is played at the beginning of the first, second and final divisions; for the khali section, Na - a right hand bol - is used to indicate that the division is open.
