= Tilwada =

Taal in Hindustani Classical Music

Tilwada or tilwara (Hindi: तिलवाडा, tilvāḍā) (Punjabi: ਤਿਲਵਾੜਾ, tilvāḍā) is a tala of Hindustani music. Like tintaal, tilwada tala also has 16 beats. Tilwada is often used in Kheyal.

== Arrangement ==
Cyclical series of equally periodical beats consisted of recurring claps and waves:

- clap, 2, 3, 4, clap, 2, 3, 4, wave, 2, 3, 4, clap, 2, 3, 4

or counted out as:

- clap, 2, 3, 4, clap, 6, 7, 8, wave, 10, 11, 12, clap 14, 15, 16

== Theka ==
This tala has the following arrangement:

Taal signs	X				2				0				3			
Maatra	1	2	3	4	5	6	7	8	9	10	11	12	13	14	15	16
Bols	Dha	TiRiKaTa	Dhin	Dhin	Dha	Dha	Tin	Tin	Ta	TiRiKaTa	Dhin	Dhin	Dha	Dha	Dhin	Dhin
Clap/Wave	Clap	2	3	4	Clap	2	3	4	Wave	2	3	4	Clap	2	3	4
