= Jhoomra =

Tala of Hindustani music

Jhoomra is a tala of Hindustani music. Jhoomra tala has 14 beats. Jhoomra is often used in the vilambit or ati-vilambit (slow) Khyal.

== Arrangement ==
Jhoomra tala can be counted like this:

- clap, 2, 3, clap, 2, 3, 4, wave, 2, 3, clap, 2, 3, 4

Or can be counted like this:

- clap, 2, 3, clap, 5, 6, 7 wave, 9, 10, clap, 12, 13, 14

== Theka ==
This is arrangement of Jhoomra:

Dhin | -Dha | TiRiKaTa
Dhin | Dhin | Dha Ge | TiRiKaTa
Tin | -Ta | TiRiKaTa
Dhin | Dhin | Dha Ge | TiRiKaTa

Theka of Jhoomra can be arranged like this:

Maatra	1	2	3	4	5	6	7	8	9	10	11	12	13	14
Bols	Dhin	-Dha	TiRiKaTa	Dhin	Dhin	Dha Ge	TiRiKaTa	Tin	-Ta	TiRiKaTa	Dhin	Dhin	Dha Ge	TiRiKaTa
Clap/Wave	Clap	2	3	Clap	2	3	4	Wave	2	3	Clap	2	3	4
