= Keherwa =

8 beat tala of Hindustani music

Keharwa or Kaharva is an 8 beat tala of Hindustani music. Keherwa has many variations including dhumaali, "bhajani", and qawwali.

== Arrangement ==
Keharwa is an 8-beat pattern used in ragas. It has eight beats in two equal divisions (vibhag). The period between every two beats is equal. The first beat out of 8 beats is called "sam" and it denotes the start of the first division. The fifth beat out of 8 beats is called "khali" and denotes the start of the second division. To exhibit the Keherwa, the performer claps on the first beat and fifth beat is waved.

== Theka ==
It has a characteristic pattern of bols (theka).

The Theka for Keharwa
dha	ge	na	ti	|	na	ka	dhi	na	|
^{x}					^{0}

== In popular culture ==
The popular Hindi film song, Rang Barse Bhige Chunar Wali from Silsila (1981), is also set in Keherwa by film's music composers duo, Shiv-Hari, who are noted classical musicians. The contemporary traditional Eid al-Fitr song for Bengali Muslims, O Mon Romzaner Oi Rozar Sheshe, is also set in Keherwa rhythm.
