= Chowtal =

Chowtal or Chautal or Chawtal, aside from being the name of a "taal"/"tala" or meter in Hindustani classical music, is a form of folksong of North India's Bhojpuri region, sung during the Phagwa or Holi festival.

In chowtal, two rows of singers face each other (semi-circle), with a "dholak" drummer at one end, and sing lines of Hindi text antiphonally. While the melodies are relatively simple, the song undergoes various modulations of rhythm and tempo, alternating between subdued passages and exciting climaxes. Chowtal is generally sung by enthusiasts for their own pleasure, rather than for an audience. "Chowtal" is an umbrella term for the format, which comprises various subgenres including chowtal proper, jhumar, ulara, lej, baiswara, dhamar, rasiya, kabir, jogira, and others. Chowtal is performed today in various parts of the Bhojpuri region, but is in decline.

During 1838–1917, chowtal was one of the Bhojpuri folk music genres transmitted by indentured workers to the Caribbean (primarily Trinidad and Tobago, Guyana, and Suriname), Fiji, Jamaica, Mauritius and South Africa. In these sites it has flourished vigorously—in spite of the decline of the Bhojpuri language in Trinidad and Guyana. It also flourished in secondary diaspora communities of Indo-Caribbeans in New York and Florida in the United States, Canada, the United Kingdom, the Netherlands, and elsewhere, Indo-South Africans in the United Kingdom and the United States, Indo-Mauritians in the United Kingdom, France, United States, Canada, Australia and New Zealand, and of Indo-Fijians in Australia, New Zealand, the west coast of the United States, Canada, the United Kingdom and elsewhere.
