= Matra (music) =

Beat in Indian classical music

In Indian classical music, a Matra is a beat, the smallest rhythmic sub-unit of a tala - the musical meter. It is one of the three levels of structure for tala along with Vibhag (measure) and Avartan (cycle). The significance of beats depends on their occurrence in a cycle. However, the value of the beats may be stretched or contracted depending on various factors.

== See also ==
- Hindustani classical music
- Tala
- Vibhag
