= Bol (music) =

Rhythm-defining syllable in North Indian classical music

A bol is a standardized mnemonic syllable used in North Indian classical music to define the tala, or rhythmic pattern. Bol is derived from the Hindi word bolna (बोलना), which means "to speak." One who learns to play the tabla or pakhavaj (or pakhawaj) drum is taught to recite the rhythms as bols, which can be quite complex.

Bol is analogous to konnakol, which is used to recite rhythms for the mridangam drum in Carnatic music, which is South Indian classical music.

== See also ==
- Konakkol – South Indian Carnatic musical art
- Kuchi shōga – System of notation for traditional Japanese drums
- Counting (music) – Musical system of regularly occurring sounds
- Morse code#Operator-led change from graphical to audible code – Transmission of language with brief pulses
