= Teental =

16-beat Tala in Hindustani music

Teentaal (alternatively spelled tintal, teental, or tintaal, and also called trital; Hindi: तीन ताल) is the most common taal of Hindustani music, and is used for drut (fast tempo). It is symmetrical and presents a very simple rhythmic structure against which a performance can be laid. It is of 16 beats with 4/4/4/4/ pattern and 4 divisions.There are 3 claps(tali) and 1 gap(khali).

== Arrangement ==
Teentaal has sixteen (16) beats in four equal divisions (Vibhag). The period between every two beats is equal. The first beat out of 16 beats is called sam and the 9th beat is called khali ('empty'). To count the Teentaal, the audience claps on the first beat, claps on the 5th beat, then waves on the 9th beat and lastly again claps on the 13th beat; these three claps (Hindi teen 'three' + taal 'clap') give the rhythm its name.

== Uses ==
Teentaal can be used for both accompaniment and solo. There are various Kaidas and Parans based on it. Teentaal is the most widely used taal. Teentaal is mostly used in the drut laya and Zhalas.

Theka:

DHA DHIN DHIN DHA |

DHA DHIN DHIN DHA |

DHA TIN TIN TA |

TA DHIN DHIN DHA |

== Theka ==
मात्रा भाग : ४-४-४-४.
धा धिं धिं धा - धा धिं धिं धा - धा तिं तिं ता - ता धिं धिं धा
It has a characteristic pattern of bols (theka).

The Theka for Tintal
dha	dhin	dhin	dha	|	dha	dhin	dhin	dha	|
^{x}					^{2}
dha	tin	tin	ta	|	Ta	dhin	dhin	dha	|
^{o}					^{3}

This can also be shown using the following figure

Taal signs	X				2				0				3			
Maatra	1	2	3	4	5	6	7	8	9	10	11	12	13	14	15	16
Bols	dha	dhin	dhin	dha	dha	dhin	dhin	dha	dha	tin	tin	ta	ta	dhin	dhin	dha

Note the bols used for the first beat of each division: Dha, a bol involving both hands, is played at the beginning of the first, second and final divisions; for the khali section, Naa – a right hand bol – is used to indicate that the division is open. There are some pedagogical variations as to the actual syllables pronounced when reciting the bol, most of which occur in the final two vibhags. Also note that this variation is from the Lucknow Gherana.
