= Within You Without You =

1967 song by the Beatles

- Cover of the Northern Songs sheet music

Song by the Beatles

from the album Sgt. Pepper's Lonely Hearts Club Band
- Released: 26 May 1967
- Recorded: 15 and 22 March, 3 April 1967
- Studio: EMI, London
- Genre: Indian classical; psychedelia; raga rock
- Length: 5:05
- Label: Parlophone
- Songwriter: George Harrison
- Producer: George Martin

Audio sample
- "Within You Without You": file; help

"Within You Without You" is a song by the English rock band the Beatles from their 1967 album Sgt. Pepper's Lonely Hearts Club Band. Written by lead guitarist George Harrison, it was his second composition in the Indian classical style, after "Love You To", and inspired by his stay in India in late 1966 with his mentor and sitar teacher Ravi Shankar. Recorded in London without the other Beatles, it features Indian instrumentation such as sitar, tambura, dilruba and tabla, and was performed by Harrison and members of the Asian Music Circle. The recording marked a significant departure from the Beatles' previous work; musically, it evokes the Indian devotional tradition, while the overtly spiritual quality of the lyrics reflects Harrison's absorption in Hindu philosophy and the teachings of the Vedas.

The song was Harrison's only composition on Sgt. Pepper, although his endorsement of Indian culture was further reflected in the inclusion of yogis such as Paramahansa Yogananda among the crowd depicted on the album's cover. With the worldwide success of the album, "Within You Without You" presented Indian classical music to a new audience in the West and contributed to the genre's peak in international popularity. It also influenced the philosophical direction of many of Harrison's peers during an era of utopian idealism marked by the Summer of Love. The song has traditionally received a varied response from music critics, some of whom find it lacklustre and pretentious, while others admire its musical authenticity and consider its message to be the most meaningful on Sgt. Pepper. Writing for Rolling Stone, David Fricke described the track as "at once beautiful and severe, a magnetic sermon about materialism and communal responsibility in the middle of a record devoted to gentle Technicolor anarchy".

For the Beatles' 2006 remix album Love, the song was mixed with the John Lennon-written "Tomorrow Never Knows", creating what some reviewers consider to be that project's most successful mashup. Sonic Youth, Rainer Ptacek, Oasis, Patti Smith, Cheap Trick and the Flaming Lips are among the artists who have covered "Within You Without You".

== Background and inspiration ==
George Harrison began writing "Within You Without You" in early 1967 while at the house of musician and artist Klaus Voormann, in the north London suburb of Hampstead. Harrison's immediate inspiration for the song came from a conversation they had shared over dinner about the metaphysical space that prevents individuals from recognising the natural forces uniting the world. Following this discussion, Harrison worked out the song's melody on a harmonium and came up with the opening line: "We were talking about the space between us all".

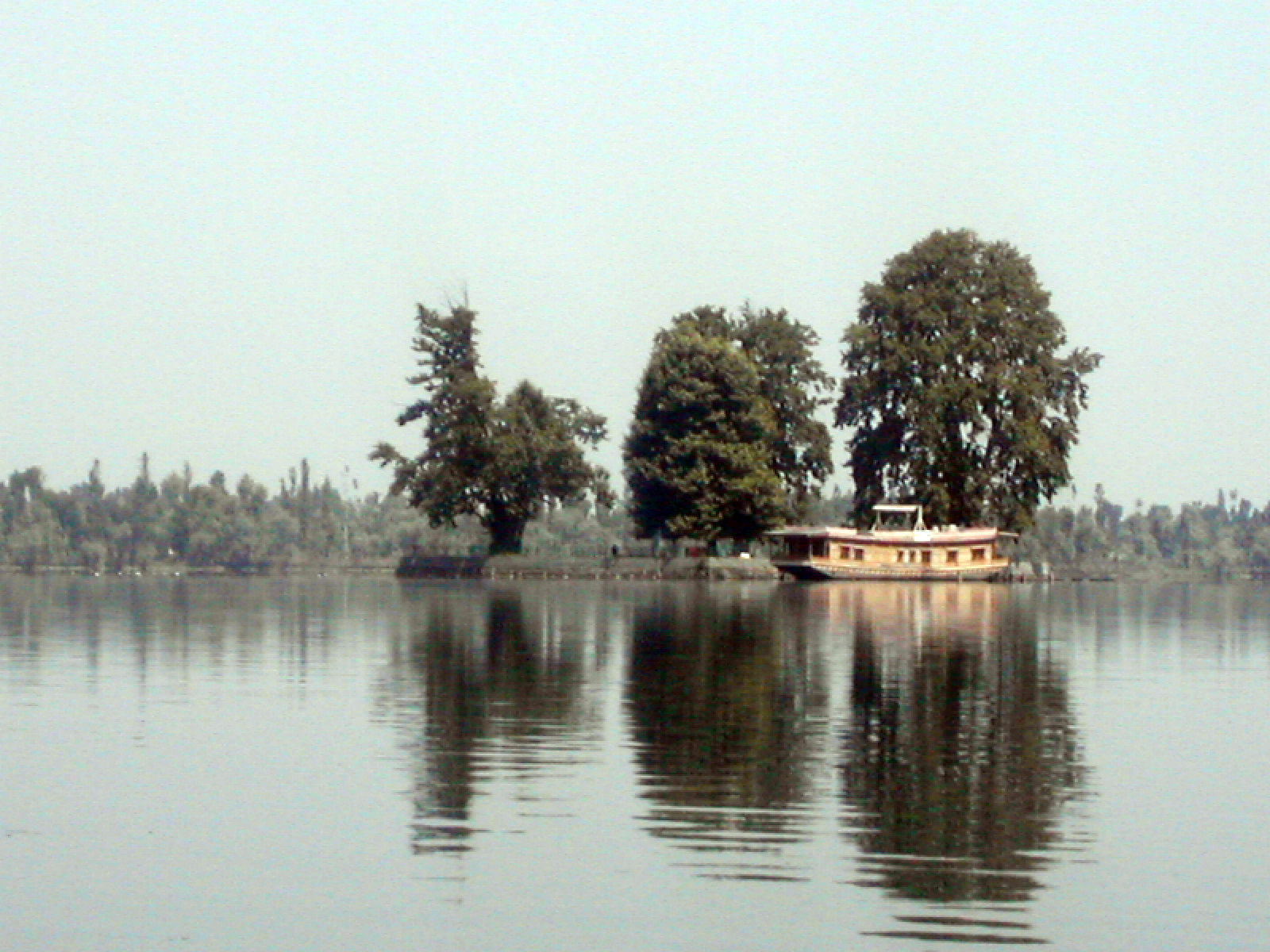
Dal Lake in Kashmir – part of the "pure essence of India" that Harrison said he experienced in 1966 and inspired the song.

The song was Harrison's second composition to be explicitly influenced by Indian classical music, after "Love You To", which featured Indian instruments such as sitar, tabla and tambura. Since recording the latter track for the Beatles' Revolver in April 1966, Harrison had continued to look outside his role as the band's lead guitarist, further immersing himself in studying the sitar, partly under the tutelage of master sitarist Ravi Shankar. Harrison said that the tune for "Within You Without You" came about through his regularly performing musical exercises known as sargam, which use the same scales as those found in Indian ragas.

"Within You Without You" is the first of Harrison's many songs to include Hindu spiritual concepts in his lyrics. Having incorporated elements of Eastern philosophy in "Love You To", Harrison became fascinated by ancient Hindu teachings after he and his wife, Pattie Boyd, visited Shankar in India in September–October 1966. Intent on mastering the sitar, Harrison first joined other students of Shankar's in Bombay, until local fans and the press learned of his arrival. (Note: In an attempt to disguise his identity, at Shankar's suggestion, Harrison had grown a moustache – a change of image that the other Beatles would follow by the end of 1966.) Harrison, Boyd, Shankar and the latter's partner, Kamala Chakravarty, then relocated to a houseboat on Dal Lake in Srinagar, Kashmir. There, Harrison received personal tuition from Shankar while absorbing religious texts such as Paramahansa Yogananda's Autobiography of a Yogi and Swami Vivekananda's Raja Yoga. (Note: Shankar entrusted much of Harrison's tuition in Bombay to his protégé Shambhu Das, who also accompanied the party to Dal Lake.) This period coincided with his introduction to meditation and, during their visit to Vrindavan, he witnessed communal chanting for the first time.

Harrison and Boyd returned to England on 22 October, and continued to adhere to a Hindu-aligned lifestyle of yoga, meditation and vegetarianism at their home in Esher. (Note: On 26 October that year, at Heathrow Airport, the British press reported on the incongruous sight of Harrison, in traditional Indian clothes, greeting the newly arrived Shankar, who was dressed in a Western suit.) The education Harrison received in India, particularly regarding the illusory nature of the material world, resonated with his experiences with the hallucinogenic drug LSD (commonly known as "acid"), and informed his lyrics to "Within You Without You". Having considered leaving the Beatles after the completion of their third US tour, on 29 August 1966, he instead gained a philosophical perspective on the effects of the band's international fame. (Note: Referring to Harrison's maturation, music journalist Neil Spencer wrote in 2002: "It wasn't just India, its music, and his new-found enthusiasm for religion and philosophy. Now he knew how it felt not to be a Beatle. None of the others had that.") He later attributed "Within You Without You" to his having "fallen under the spell of the country" after experiencing the "pure essence of India" through Shankar's guidance.

== Composition ==
=== Music ===
"Within You Without You" was a song that I wrote based upon a piece of music of Ravi [Shankar]'s that he'd recorded for All-India Radio. It was a very long piece – maybe thirty or forty minutes ... I wrote a mini version of it, using sounds similar to those I'd discovered on his piece.

— George Harrison discussing the composition in 2000

The song follows the pitches of Khamaj thaat, the Indian equivalent of Mixolydian mode. Written and performed in the tonic key of C (but subsequently sped up to C♯ on the official recording), it features what musicologist Dominic Pedler terms an "exotic" melody over a constant C-G "root-fifth" drone, which is neither major nor minor in mode. Based on a piece that Shankar had written for All India Radio, the structure of the composition adheres to the Hindustani musical tradition and demonstrates Harrison's advances in the Indian classical genre since "Love You To".

Following a brief alap, which serves to introduce the song's main musical themes, "Within You Without You" comprises three distinct sections: two verses and a chorus; an extended instrumental passage; and a final verse and chorus. The alap consists of tambura drone, over which the main melody is outlined on dilruba, a bow-played string instrument that Boyd began learning in India. Throughout the vocal section of the song – the gat, in traditional Indian terms – the rhythm is a 16-beat tintal in madhya laya (medium tempo). The vocal line is supported throughout by dilruba, in the manner of a sarangi echoing the melody in a khyal piece. The first three words of each verse ("We were talking") have a tritone interval (E to B♭), which, in Pedler's view, enhances the spiritual dissonance that Harrison expresses in his lyrics.

Over the instrumental passage, the tabla rhythm switches to a 10-beat jhaptal cycle. A musical dialogue ensues in 5/4 time, first between the dilruba and sitar, then between a Western string section and sitar. The interplay between these instruments follows the call-and-response tradition of Indian classical music, known as jawab-sawal. The passage resolves in melodic unison as the instruments together state a rhythmic cadence, or tihai, to close the middle segment. After this, the drone is again prominent as the rhythm returns to 16-beat tintal for the final verse and chorus. On the finished recording, the tonal and spiritual tension is relieved by the inclusion of muted canned laughter.

In his book Indian Music and the West, Gerry Farrell writes of "Within You Without You": "The overall effect is of several disparate strands of Indian music being woven together to create a new form. It is a quintessential fusion of pop and Indian music." Peter Lavezzoli, author of The Dawn of Indian Music in the West, describes the song as "a survey of Indian classical and semiclassical styles" in which "the diverse elements ... are skillfully woven together into an interesting hybrid. If anything, the closest comparison that might be made is to the Hindu devotional song form known as bhajan."

=== Lyrics ===
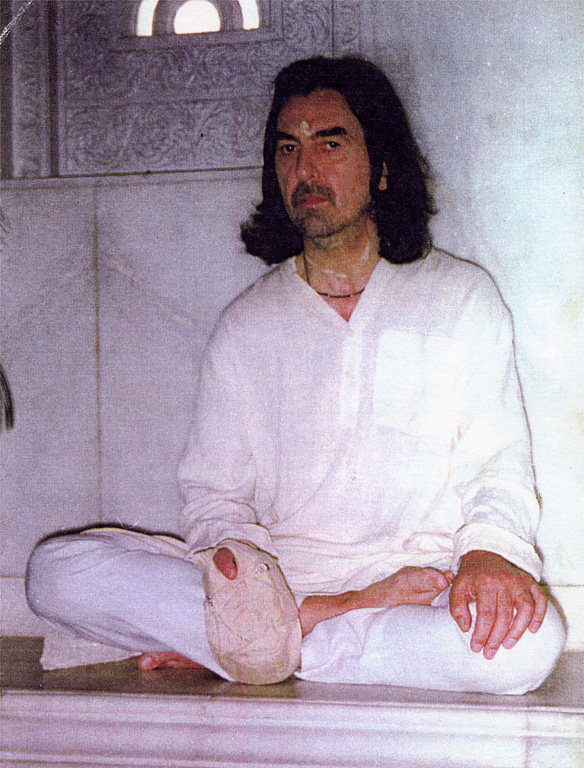
Harrison (pictured in the Hindu holy city of Vrindavan in 1996) drew from Vedanta philosophy for the first time in his lyrics to "Within You Without You".

According to Religion News Service writer Steve Rabey, "Within You Without You" "contrast[s] Western individualism with Eastern monism". The lyrics convey basic tenets of Vedanta philosophy, particularly in Harrison's reference to the concept of maya (the illusory nature of existence), in the lines "And the people who hide themselves behind a wall of illusion / Never glimpse the truth". Author Joshua Greene paraphrases the song-wide message as: "A wall of illusion separates us from each other ... which only turns our love for one another cold. Peace will come when we learn to see past the illusion of differences and come to know that we are one ..." The solution espoused by Harrison is for individuals to see beyond the self and each seek change within, further to Vivekananda's contention in Raja Yoga that "Each soul is potentially divine. The goal is to manifest that divinity ..." According to ethnomusicologist David Reck, aside from the reference to maya, the lyrics convey Indian philosophical concepts such as advait (the one essential reality), satya (perception of truth) and, in the line "With our love we could save the world", universal love.

At times in the song, Harrison distances himself from those who live in ignorance of these apparent truths – saying, "If they only knew" and asking the listener, "Are you one of them?" In the final verse, he quotes from the gospels of St Matthew and St Mark, lamenting those who "gain the world and lose their soul". Author Ian MacDonald defends the "accusatory finger" behind such statements, saying that, within the ideology of the emerging 1960s counterculture, "this is a token of what was then felt to be a revolution in progress: an inner revolution against materialism".

The transcendental theme of Harrison's lyrics aligned with the philosophy behind the 1967 Summer of Love – namely, the search for universality and an ego-less existence. Author Ian Inglis considers the line "With our love we could save the world" to be a "cogent reflection" of the Summer of Love ethos, anticipating the utopian message of Harrison's composition "It's All Too Much" and the John Lennon-written "All You Need Is Love". (Note: At the Beatles' press conference in New York on 22 August 1966, Harrison was asked to name the most important aspect of life, to which he replied, "Love." When then asked for his "personal goal", he said: "To do as well as I can at whatever I attempt and, someday, to die with a peaceful mind.") Inglis adds, with reference to the chorus: "The lyrics are given greater depth by the double meaning of without – 'in the absence of' and 'outside' – each of which is perfectly applicable to the song's sentiments."

== Production ==
=== Recording ===
Harrison recorded "Within You Without You" for the Beatles' Sgt. Pepper's Lonely Hearts Club Band, an album based around Paul McCartney's vision of a fictitious band that would serve as the Beatles' alter egos after their decision to quit touring. Harrison had little interest in McCartney's concept; he later admitted that, following his return from India, "my heart was still out there", and working with the Beatles again "felt like going backwards". He presented the song after it was decided to exclude his composition "Only a Northern Song", which the Beatles recorded in February 1967. In contrast to his prominence as a songwriter on Revolver, "Within You Without You" was Harrison's sole composition on Sgt. Pepper.

George has done a great Indian one. We came along one night and he had about 400 Indian fellas playing there ... it was a great swinging evening, as they say.

— John Lennon recalling the recording of "Within You Without You", 1967

The recording features musical contributions from only Harrison, Beatles aide Neil Aspinall, and a group of London-based Indian musicians. As with his Indian accompanists on "Love You To", Harrison sourced these contributors through the Asian Music Circle in north London. Harrison missed a Beatles recording session to attend one of Shankar's London concerts, an absence that served as part of his preparation for recording "Within You Without You".

MacDonald describes the song as "Stylistically ... the most distant departure from the staple Beatles sound in their discography". (Note: Lavezzoli similarly considers the 5/4-time instrumental segment to be "by far the most radical departure from the normal stylistic parameters of a Beatles recording".) The basic track was recorded on 15 March 1967 at EMI's Abbey Road studio 2 in London. The participants sat on a carpet in the studio, which was decorated with Indian tapestries on the walls, with the lights turned low and incense burning. Harrison and Aspinall each played a tambura, while the Indian musicians contributed on tabla, dilruba and tambura. (Note: The identity of the Indian players remained unknown for several decades. Research undertaken by the Department of Music at the University of Liverpool has since identified four of the musicians as Anna Joshi, Amrit Gajjar (both dilruba), Buddhadev Kansara (tambura) and Natwar Soni (tabla).) Musicologist Michael Hannan comments that, relative to standard Indian practice, the use of three tamburas produces "a denser-than-usual, pulsating jivari" (or "buzzing sound"), highlighting the naturally rich harmonics of the instrument.

The session was also attended by Lennon, artist Peter Blake, and John Barham, an English classical pianist and student of Shankar who shared Harrison's desire to promote Indian music to Western audiences. In Barham's recollection, Harrison "had the entire structure of the song mapped out in his head" and sang the melody that he wanted the dilruba player to follow. The twin hand-drums of the tabla were close-miked by recording engineer Geoff Emerick, in order to capture what he later described as "the texture and the lovely low resonances" of the instrument.

=== Overdubbing and mixing ===
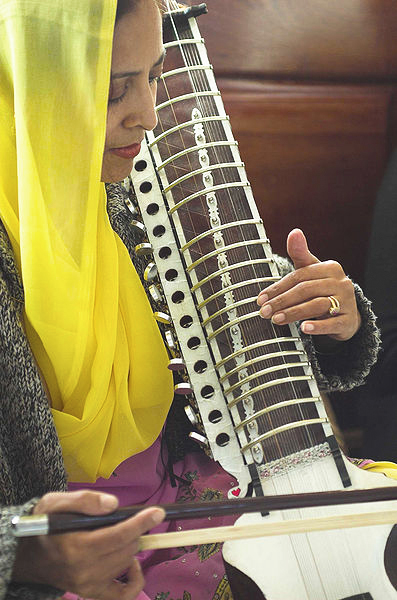
The bow-played dilruba features prominently throughout the song.

The first of two overdubbing sessions for "Within You Without You" took place at Abbey Road on 22 March. Two more dilruba parts were added that day, after which a reduction mix was carried out, to allow for further overdubs onto the four-track recording. The completed track also includes an Indian zither or harp, known as a swarmandal. Played by Harrison, the swarmandal provides the glissando flourishes that introduce the tabla during the song's alap and signal the return to 16-beat tintal before the final verse. (Note: While his contribution as a songwriter was minimal, Harrison added Indian musical styling to several other songs during the sessions for Sgt. Pepper. These include swarmandal on "Strawberry Fields Forever" and sitar and tambura on "Lucy in the Sky with Diamonds", which also features a lead guitar part where he imitates a sarangi behind Lennon's vocal line.)

Producer George Martin then arranged the string orchestration, for eight violins and three cellos, based on Harrison's instructions. The pair worked hard together on the arrangement, ensuring that Martin's score imitated the slides and bends of the dilrubas. (Note: In the opinion of music journalist Mark Prendergast, the Western strings suggest a Carnatic (or South Indian) quality, contrasting with the song's adherence to the Hindustani (North Indian) musical tradition.) The orchestral parts, performed by members of the London Symphony Orchestra, were added on 3 April. During the same session, Harrison recorded his vocal and a sitar part, the solo of which, in the description of music critic David Fricke, "sings and swings with the clarity and phrasing of his best rockabilly-fired guitar work". (Note: While discussing "Within You Without You" in a 1979 interview, Harrison reflected that the song "sounds a bit dopey now in retrospect" but expressed satisfaction with his sitar solo.) Harrison also overdubbed occasional interjections on acoustic guitar.

On 4 April, while preparing the final mixes of the song, in stereo and mono, Harrison added crowd laughter taken from a sound effects tape in the Abbey Road library. Martin and Emerick were both opposed to this addition but deferred to Harrison, who later said that the laughter provided "some light relief", adding: "You were supposed to hear the audience anyway, as they listen to Sergeant Pepper's Show." The completed recording was enhanced in the mixes through the liberal application of automatic double tracking. Before Harrison had recorded his vocals the previous day, the track had been edited and then sped up so that its length was reduced from 5:25 to 5:05. In the process, the song's key was raised a semitone, to C♯.

== Release ==
Harrison's Māyan discourse [in "Within You Without You"] establishes the firmament for the Beatles' utopian sentiments that ultimately propel the Summer of Love into being: "With our love we could save the world," Harrison sings.

— Kenneth Womack, 2014

Sgt. Pepper's Lonely Hearts Club Band was released on 26 May 1967, with "Within You Without You" sequenced as the opening track on side two of the LP. Greene notes that for many listeners at the time, the song provided their "first meaningful contact with meditative sound". In his 1977 book The Beatles Forever, Nicholas Schaffner likened "Within You Without You" to Hermann Hesse's Siddhartha – an influential novel among the counterculture during the Summer of Love – in terms of the song's evocation of Hesse's "idealization of individuality" and "vision of a mysterious East". Eager to separate the song's message from the LSD experience at a time when the drug had grown in popularity and influence, Harrison told an interviewer: "It's nothing to do with pills ... It's just in your own head, the realisation."

Although Harrison later spoke dismissively of the Sgt. Pepper project and its legacy, (Note: Speaking in the 1980s about the album's impact, Harrison described it as "a milestone and a millstone in music history".) he conceded that he had enjoyed working on the record's iconic cover. For this, he asked Blake to include pictures of four Indian yogis – Yogananda, Mahavatar Babaji, Lahiri Mahasaya and Sri Yukteswar – among the crowd surrounding the Beatles; as a further Indian detail, a four-armed idol of the Hindu goddess Lakshmi was placed in the garlands of flowers at the bottom of the image. Among the song's lyrics, printed on the back cover, the positioning of the words "Without You" beside McCartney's head served as a clue in the Paul Is Dead rumour, which grew in the United States partly as a result of the Beatles' failure to perform live after 1966.

In 1971 the song was issued as the title track of an EP release in Mexico. Part of a series of Beatles releases sequenced by Lennon, the EP also included the Harrison-written tracks "Love You To", "The Inner Light" and "I Want to Tell You". In 1978 "Within You Without You" appeared as the B-side to the "Sgt. Pepper's Lonely Hearts Club Band"/"With a Little Help from My Friends" medley, on singles released in West Germany and some other European countries. An instrumental version of the track, at the original speed and in the key of C, appeared on the Beatles' 1996 outtakes compilation Anthology 2.

== Critical reception ==
=== Contemporary reviews ===
Recalling the song's release in his book The Beatles Diary, Barry Miles writes: "Some thought it a masterpiece, some a prime example of mock-philosophical babble. Either way, it was pure Harrison." David Griffiths of Record Mirror praised the album's musical and lyrical scope, which included "life-enhancing philosophy", and added: "George Harrison's 'Within You Without You' is a beautifully successful and adventurous statement in song of a Yoga truth." The Times of India's music critic similarly admired the Beatles for "explor[ing] farther reaches in the musical firmament" and described Harrison's composition as a "memorable" track. In one of the few unfavourable reviews for Sgt. Pepper, Richard Goldstein, writing in The New York Times, said the song was "remarkable" musically and a highlight of the album, yet he considered the lyrics "dismal" and full of "the very clichés the Beatles helped bury". (Note: According to Robert Christgau, in his December 1967 column for Esquire magazine, Goldstein was vilified for his views on Sgt. Pepper. Among the many letters sent to The New York Times, one of the most frequent complaints concerned Goldstein's dismissal of the lyrics to "Within You Without You".) Allen Evans of the NME found the "deep, rich rhythm" of the tabla "most appealing", although he bemoaned that it was difficult to decipher the lyrics "because they merge with the sitar music so closely".

According to the Beatles' official biographer, Hunter Davies, writing in 1968, some contemporary reviewers speculated that the burst of laughter at the end of "Within You Without You" was inserted by Harrison's bandmates to mock the song. Davies corrected this misconception, saying: "It was completely George's idea." (Note: MacDonald cites Harrison's use of laughter as a key example of the Beatles' propensity for an "undertone of irony ... even in their moments of ostensible decorum". He suggests that this especially Liverpudlian trait was often misunderstood by the band's listeners outside England, particularly those in America.) In a review published five months after the release of Sgt. Pepper, Hit Parader considered that the album had not endured as well as the Beatles' previous works, and opined: "Harrison has produced a soothing, sinuous, exotic sound for 'Within You Without You'. But even though his repetitious recitation of elementary Far Eastern philosophy is probably intended to reflect the infinity of the universe, it soon becomes a bit monotonous. The laughter at the end seems to be deflating the pretentiousness of the lyrics."

=== Retrospective assessment ===
The song has continued to invite widely diverse opinions. Among the most unfavourable assessments, author and critic Tim Riley, writing in 1988, dismissed "Within You Without You" as "directionless", adding that it was difficult to conceive how "lines such as 'Life flows on within you and without you' were taken seriously". He also said that the song was "the most dated piece on the record ... [and] could easily have been left off with little to no effect" on the album. In a 2009 review, Alex Young of Consequence of Sound grouped it with the "major clunkers" on Sgt. Pepper. Conversely, Ian Inglis considers the song to be "absolutely central to the form and content" of its parent album, and Ian MacDonald views it as the "conscience" of Sgt. Pepper and "the necessary sermon that comes with the community singing". (Note: While comparing the song with "All You Need Is Love" – a "transcendental statement" from the Summer of Love that would similarly be misinterpreted in "the materialistic Eighties" – MacDonald opines: "Described by those with no grasp of the ethos of 1967 as a blot on a classic LP, 'Within You Without You' is central to the outlook that shaped Sgt. Pepper – a view justifiable then, as it is justifiable now.") Musicologist Russell Reising writes that Harrison's song provides the exception on Sgt. Pepper, where the Beatles otherwise "retreated lyrically into predominantly banal, occasionally schmaltzy, and often trivial vignettes". Author and critic Kenneth Womack terms it "quite arguably, the album's ethical soul".

Writing for Rough Guides, Chris Ingham admires the track as "beautifully put together"; he describes it as both "some of the most exotic music released under the Beatles' name" and a "philosophical meditation on life and love beyond self ... [that], once surrendered to, is a central part of the Pepper experience". In his book on the history of ambient music, Mark Prendergast includes "Within You Without You" among the album's "three outstanding cuts" and deems it to be "the most timeless piece of dronal psychedelia ever recorded". AllMusic critic Richie Unterberger admires the melody, but he considers the track overlong and notes the potential for offence in this, "the first Beatles song where [Harrison's] Indian religious beliefs affected the lyrics with full force".

Musicologist Allan Moore says that Harrison's "command of the quasi-Indian medium is of a very high order" and, with regard to the song's message, he writes: "In its explicit, prescient call to the me-generation, perhaps 'Within You Without You' is a key track [on the album] ... expressing the deepest commitment to the counter-culture." PopMatters' Ross Langager has attributed a similar significance to the track:

Sgt. Pepper is about Britain, and the Summer of Love was always about America. The only song on the album that approaches the ideology and rhetoric of the hippie counterculture was George Harrison's sole contribution, the lush sitar-washed "Within You Without You", and it follows that Harrison was the only Beatle to have visited Haight-Ashbury at the peak of the scene. Even then, Eastern philosophy informed the lyric more deeply than did acid culture, and it's still a dense and stunning composition no matter its ideology.

Writing for Rolling Stone in 2002, David Fricke included "Within You Without You" on his list of the "25 Essential Harrison Performances". He described it as, variously, the Beatles' "purest excursion ... into raga", and "at once beautiful and severe, a magnetic sermon about materialism and communal responsibility in the middle of a record devoted to gentle Technicolor anarchy". In his review of the 50th anniversary edition of Sgt. Pepper for the same publication, Mikal Gilmore said that only "Within You Without You" and Lennon's "A Day in the Life" transcend the album's legacy as "a gestalt: a whole that was greater than the sum of its parts". In 2017, "Within You Without You" was ranked at number 50 on a list of the best Beatles songs, as compiled by the music staff of Time Out London.

== Cultural influence and legacy ==
Sgt. Pepper's "Within You, Without You" exemplified the transformation – a transfusion of Indian melody and instrumentation that captured the zeitgeist of millions of freaky young 'uns sitting around discussing consciousness. Needless to say, sitar sales skyrocketed, as did the demand for gurus.

— Michael Simmons, Mojo, 2011

Harrison's interest in Indian culture was swiftly adopted by his peers as well as their audience. Author Simon Leng writes that "'Within You Without You', and Harrison's leadership of the Beatles into Vedic philosophy, sparked the entire fashion for Indian music and a million backpackers' pilgrimages to Kashmir ..." Juan Mascaró, a professor in Sanskrit studies at Cambridge University, wrote to Harrison after the song's release, saying: "it is a moving song, and may it move the souls of millions. And there is more to come, as you are only beginning on the great journey." (Note: In the same letter, Mascaró enclosed a copy of his book Lamps of Fire and suggested that a passage he had translated from the Tao Te Ching might make a suitable subject for a song. Harrison duly used this passage in the lyrics to "The Inner Light", his third fully Indian-styled Beatles track.)

According to New Yorker journalist Mark Hertsgaard, the lyrics to "Within You Without You" "contained the album's most overt expression of the Beatles' shared belief in spiritual awareness and social change". Harrison's espousal of Eastern philosophy dominated the group's extracurricular activities by mid 1967, and his influence within the band continued to increase. This led to the Beatles' endorsement of Transcendental Meditation and their highly publicised attendance at Maharishi Mahesh Yogi's spiritual retreat in Rishikesh, India, early the following year.

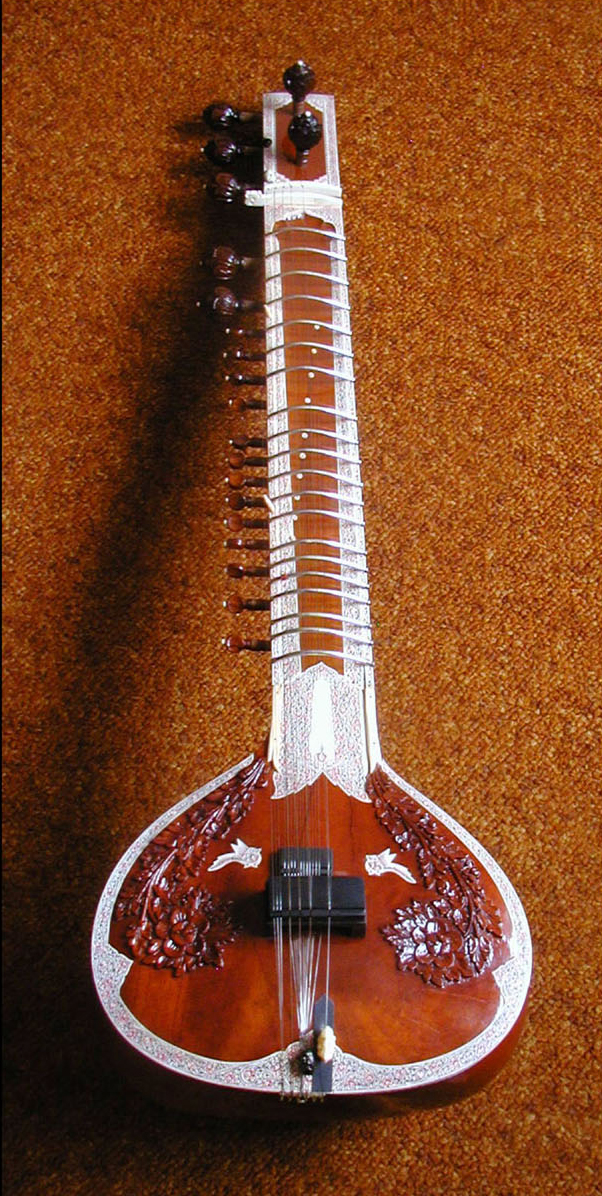
Aided by the Beatles' song, the sitar, and Indian classical music generally, reached its peak in popularity in the West in 1967.

Among other contemporary rock musicians, Stephen Stills was so taken with the song that he had its lyrics carved on a stone monument in his yard. Lennon also admired the track, saying of Harrison: "His mind and his music are clear. There is his innate talent, he brought that sound together." (Note: In a 1973 interview, Lennon said it was his favourite song of Harrison's. Similarly impressed, Ringo Starr said in 2000: "'Within You Without You' is brilliant. I love it.") David Crosby, who introduced Harrison to Shankar's music in 1965, described Harrison's fusion of ideas as "utterly brilliant", adding: "He did it beautifully and tastefully ... He did it at absolutely the highest level that he could, and I was extremely proud of him for that." Writing in the "100 Rock Icons" issue of Classic Rock, in 2006, singer Paul Rodgers cited the track to support Harrison's standing as what the magazine called "the Beatles' musical medicine man". Rodgers said: "He introduced me and a generation of people worldwide to the wisdom of the East. His thought-provoking 'Within You Without You' – with sitars, tablas and deep lyrics – was something completely different, even in a world full of unique music." (Note: American musician Gary Wright recalls listening to "Within You Without You" repeatedly in the summer of 1967 while touring Europe for the first time, and he says: "I was transported to another place of consciousness. I'd never heard such sound textures before.")

Music critic Ken Hunt describes the song as an "early landmark" in Harrison's championing of Shankar, and Indian classical music generally, which gained "real global attention" for the first time through the Beatle's commitment. (Note: In his autobiography, Raga Mala, Shankar cites the media's discovery that he was teaching Harrison sitar in Bombay as the cause for his elevated status to that of a "superstar", leading to his high-profile appearances at US rock music festivals such as Monterey (in June 1967) and Woodstock (August 1969).) Peter Lavezzoli also highlights the effect of Sgt. Pepper and its "spiritual centerpiece ['Within You Without You']" on Shankar's popularity, during a year that served as "the annus mirabilis" for Indian music and "a watershed moment in the West when the search for higher consciousness and an alternative world view had reached critical mass". In his Harrison obituary for Salon, in December 2001, Ira Robbins considered "Within You Without You" to be "the song that most clearly articulated his devotion, both artistic and philosophical, to India", with a lyric that "pairs worldview and personality in lines that now seem prophetic".

Writing in 2013, ethnomusicologist Jeffrey Cupchik said that Harrison's Indian-influenced songs, particularly "Within You Without You", "marked the inception of a new 'hybridic' East–West style of music composition – a style that is immensely widespread today". Musicologist Walter Everett lists Spirit's "Mechanical World" and the Incredible String Band's "Maya", both released in 1968, and much of the Moody Blues' 1969 album To Our Children's Children's Children as works that were directly influenced by the song. Dead Can Dance's 1996 album Spiritchaser includes the track "Indus", the melody of which was found to be very similar to that of "Within You Without You". The duo's singer, Lisa Gerrard, told The Boston Globe that they had obtained Harrison's blessing but "the [record company] pushed it", with the result that they were forced to give the former Beatle a partial songwriting credit. In their 1978 television film satirising the Beatles' history, All You Need Is Cash, the Rutles parodied "Within You Without You" on the track "Nevertheless", performed by Rikki Fataar in the role of Stig O' Hara. (Note: Made with input from Harrison, the film also satirised his spiritual preoccupations as, following the Rutles' break-up, Stig withdraws from the limelight to become a female flight attendant with Air India.) Harrison himself included musical quotations from "Within You Without You" in his 1987 song "When We Was Fab" and in the instrumental "Marwa Blues", released in 2002 on his final studio album, Brainwashed.

Coinciding with the 50th anniversary of Sgt. Pepper's Lonely Hearts Club Band, the Royal Liverpool Philharmonic Orchestra (RLPO) staged an event titled "George Harrison 'Within You Without You': The Story of The Beatles and Indian Music" at the Liverpool Philharmonic Hall. While carrying out research for this project, academics from the University of Liverpool and the University of Sheffield discovered the identity of the Indian musicians on the 1967 recording. The two surviving players, Buddhadev Kansara and Natwar Soni, were among the performers at the RLPO event.

== Love remix ==
"Within You Without You" was included on the soundtrack remix album Love (2006), which was created for the Cirque du Soleil stage show of the same name. Harrison's vocal appears over the rhythm section from "Tomorrow Never Knows", after the track opens with Lennon's lyric from the latter song. Reviewing the album for PopMatters, Zeth Lundy writes: "The 'Within You Without You'/'Tomorrow Never Knows' mash-up, perhaps the most thrilling and effective track on the entire disc, fuses two especially transcendental songs into one: ... a union of two ambiguous, open-ended declarations of spiritual pursuit." (Note: The tabla part from "Within You Without You" was used again on Love, mixed into the start of "Here Comes the Sun". The track then segues into a transition piece featuring Indian instrumentation from "The Inner Light".) Paul Moody of Uncut similarly considers it to be the "best of all" the mashups on Love, with the two tracks' "cosmic drones ... fitted together like a glove". In their chapter on the Beatles' psychedelic period in The Cambridge Companion to the Beatles, authors Russell Reising and Jim LeBlanc describe "Within You Without You/Tomorrow Never Knows" as "the most musically and visually stunning segment" of the Cirque du Soleil show.

Remixed and remastered by George Martin and his son Giles, "Within You Without You"/"Tomorrow Never Knows" was the first track prepared for Love. Speaking to Mojo magazine in December 2006, Giles Martin said that he had first created a demo combining the two songs, which he then nervously presented to McCartney and Ringo Starr for their approval. In Martin's recollection, "they loved it", which allowed the project to proceed. A video clip of the completed track was made to promote the album and was included on the 2015 DVD 1+. The Love remix is one of the songs in The Beatles: Rock Band.

== Cover versions ==
Big Jim Sullivan, a British session guitarist who became proficient on the sitar, included "Within You Without You" on his album of Indian music-style recordings, titled Sitar Beat and first released in 1967. In the same year, the Soulful Strings recorded the song for their album Groovin' with the Soulful Strings, a version that also appeared on the B-side of their most successful single, "Burning Spear".

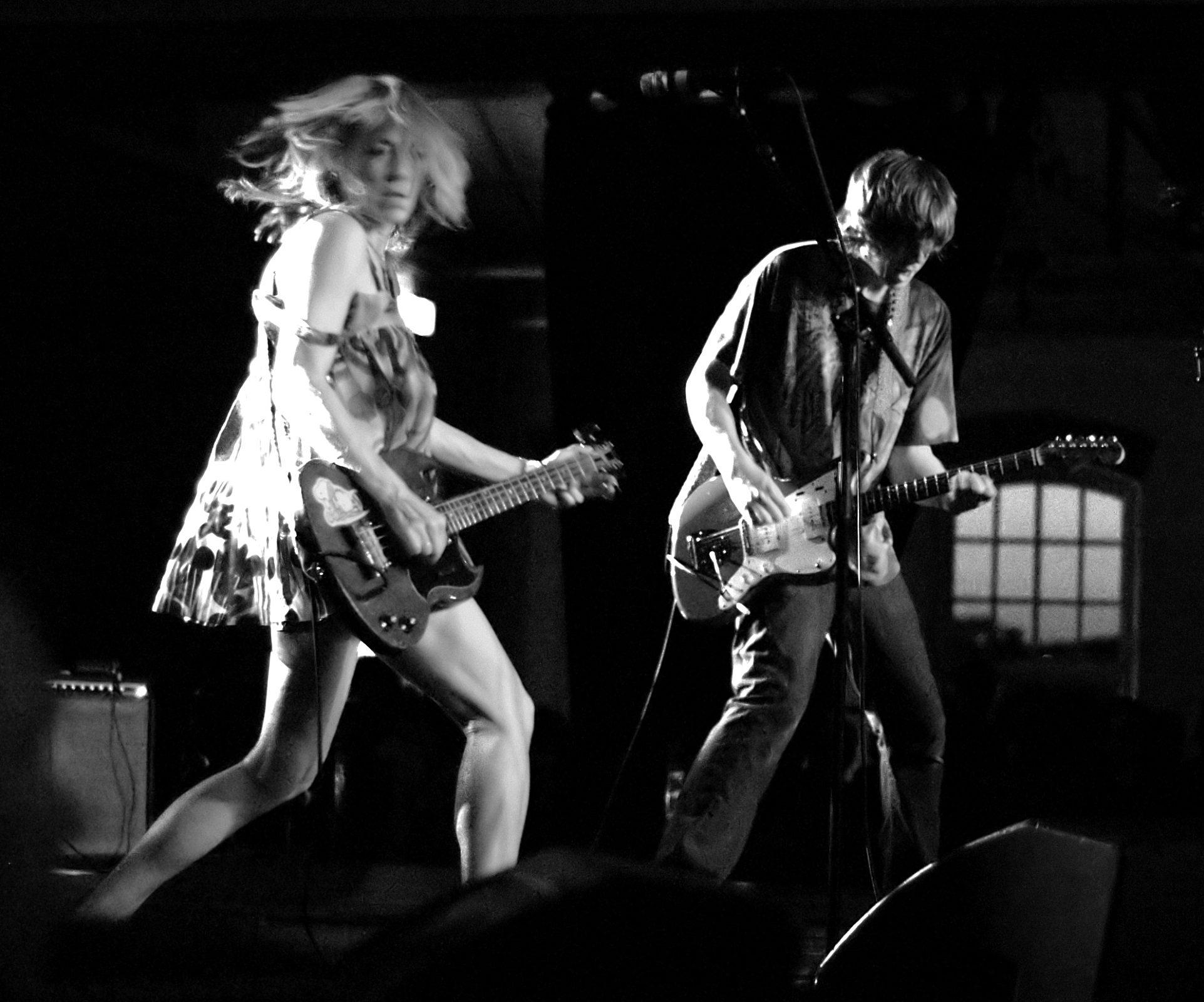
A 1988 cover version by Sonic Youth (pictured performing in 2005) transformed "Within You Without You" into a rock song, complete with guitar feedback.

In 1988, Sonic Youth recorded "Within You Without You" for the NME's multi-artist tribute Sgt. Pepper Knew My Father. Fricke highlights this recording as an example of how, regardless of its Indian origins, the composition can be interpreted on electric guitar effectively and "with transportive force". In 2007, the staff of the pop culture website Vulture placed Sonic Youth's version at number 2 in their list titled "Our Ten Favorite Beatles Covers of All Time".

Big Daddy covered the song on their 1992 Sgt. Pepper tribute album, a release that Moore recognises as "the most audacious" of the many interpretations of the Beatles' 1967 LP. Moore says that "Within You Without You" serves as the album's "cleverest pastiche", performed in a free jazz style reminiscent of Ornette Coleman or Don Cherry. Other acts who have covered the song for Sgt. Pepper tributes include Oasis, on a BBC Radio 2 project celebrating the album's 40th anniversary (2007); Easy Star All-Stars (featuring Matisyahu), on Easy Star's Lonely Hearts Dub Band (2009); Cheap Trick, on their Sgt. Pepper Live DVD (2009); and the Flaming Lips, with featured guests Birdflower and Morgan Delt, on With a Little Help from My Fwends (2014). A recording by Big Head Todd and the Monsters appeared on the 2003 Harrison tribute Songs from the Material World.

Guitarist Rainer Ptacek opened his 1994 album Nocturnes with what AllMusic critic Bob Gottlieb describes as a "stunning instrumental" reading of the song, recorded live in a chapel in Tucson, Arizona. Writing for the same website, Brian Downing considers a 1997 version by Ptacek, released on his posthumous album Live at the Performance Center, to be "perhaps one of the best unheralded Beatles covers of all time". Patti Smith included it on her 2007 covers album Twelve, a version that, according to BBC music critic Chris Jones, "sounds like [the song] could have been written for her". Other artists who have recorded "Within You Without You" include Peter Knight and his Orchestra, Firefall, Glenn Mercer of the Feelies, Angels of Venice and Thievery Corporation.

== Personnel ==
According to Ian MacDonald and details released by the University of Liverpool in June 2017 (except where noted):

The Beatles

- George Harrison – lead vocals, tambura, sitar, swarmandal, acoustic guitar

Additional musicians

- Anna Joshi – dilruba
- Amrit Gajjar – dilruba
- Natwar Soni – tabla
- Buddhadev Kansara – tambura
- Neil Aspinall – tambura
- Erich Gruenberg, Alan Loveday, Julien Gaillard, Paul Scherman, Ralph Elman, David Wolfsthal, Jack Rothstein, Jack Greene – violins
- Reginald Kilbey, Allen Ford, Peter Beavan – cellos

== Sources ==
- Allison, Dale C. Jr. (2006). The Love There That's Sleeping: The Art and Spirituality of George Harrison. New York, NY: Continuum. ISBN 978-0-8264-1917-0.
- Bagirov, Alex (2008). The Anthology of the Beatles Records. Rostock: Something Books. ISBN 978-3-936300-44-4.
- The Beatles (2000). The Beatles Anthology. San Francisco, CA: Chronicle Books. ISBN 0-8118-2684-8.
- Boyd, Pattie; with Junor, Penny (2007). Wonderful Today: The Autobiography. London: Headline Review. ISBN 978-0-7553-1646-5.
- Brend, Mark (2005). Strange Sounds: Offbeat Instruments and Sonic Experiments in Pop. San Francisco, CA: Backbeat Books. ISBN 9-780879-308551.
- Clayson, Alan (2003). George Harrison. London: Sanctuary. ISBN 1-86074-489-3.
- Davies, Hunter (2009) [1968]. The Beatles (rev. edn). New York, NY: W.W. Norton. ISBN 978-0-393-33874-4.
- The Editors of Rolling Stone (2002). Harrison. New York, NY: Rolling Stone Press. ISBN 978-0-7432-3581-5.
- Emerick, Geoff; Massey, Howard (2006). Here, There and Everywhere: My Life Recording the Music of the Beatles. New York, NY: Gotham Books. ISBN 978-1-59240-269-4.
- Everett, Walter (1999). The Beatles as Musicians: Revolver Through the Anthology. New York, NY: Oxford University Press. ISBN 0-19-512941-5.
- Farrell, Gerry (1997). Indian Music and the West. London: Oxford University Press. ISBN 978-0-19-816717-4.
- Greene, Joshua M. (2006). Here Comes the Sun: The Spiritual and Musical Journey of George Harrison. Hoboken, NJ: John Wiley & Sons. ISBN 978-0-470-12780-3.
- Hannan, Michael (2016) [2008]. "The Sound Design of Sgt. Pepper's Lonely Hearts Club Band". In Julien, Olivier (ed.). Sgt. Pepper and the Beatles: It Was Forty Years Ago Today. Abingdon, UK: Routledge. ISBN 978-0-7546-6708-7.
- Harrison, George (2002) [1980]. I, Me, Mine. San Francisco, CA: Chronicle Books. ISBN 978-0-8118-5900-4.
- Hertsgaard, Mark (1996). A Day in the Life: The Music and Artistry of the Beatles. London: Pan Books. ISBN 0-330-33891-9.
- Huntley, Elliot J. (2006). Mystical One: George Harrison – After the Break-up of the Beatles. Toronto, ON: Guernica Editions. ISBN 1-55071-197-0.
- Ingham, Chris (2006). The Rough Guide to the Beatles (2nd edn). London: Rough Guides/Penguin. ISBN 978-1-84836-525-4.
- Inglis, Ian (2010). The Words and Music of George Harrison. Santa Barbara, CA: Praeger. ISBN 978-0-313-37532-3.
- Kruth, John (2015). This Bird Has Flown: The Enduring Beauty of Rubber Soul Fifty Years On. Milwaukee, WI: Backbeat Books. ISBN 978-1-61713-573-6.
- Lavezzoli, Peter (2006). The Dawn of Indian Music in the West. New York, NY: Continuum. ISBN 0-8264-2819-3.
- Leng, Simon (2006). While My Guitar Gently Weeps: The Music of George Harrison. Milwaukee, WI: Hal Leonard. ISBN 978-1-4234-0609-9.
- Lewisohn, Mark (2005) [1988]. The Complete Beatles Recording Sessions: The Official Story of the Abbey Road Years 1962–1970. London: Bounty Books. ISBN 978-0-7537-2545-0.
- MacDonald, Ian (1998). Revolution in the Head: The Beatles' Records and the Sixties. London: Pimlico. ISBN 978-0-7126-6697-8.
- Miles, Barry (2001). The Beatles Diary Volume 1: The Beatles Years. London: Omnibus Press. ISBN 0-7119-8308-9.
- Moore, Allan F. (1997). The Beatles: Sgt. Pepper's Lonely Hearts Club Band. Cambridge, UK: Cambridge University Press. ISBN 978-0-521-57484-6.
- Pedler, Dominic (2003). The Songwriting Secrets of the Beatles. London: Omnibus Press. ISBN 978-0-7119-8167-6.
- Prendergast, Mark (2003). The Ambient Century: From Mahler to Moby – The Evolution of Sound in the Electronic Age. New York, NY: Bloomsbury. ISBN 1-58234-323-3.
- Reck, David (2016) [2008]. "The Beatles and Indian Music". In Julien, Olivier (ed.). Sgt. Pepper and the Beatles: It Was Forty Years Ago Today. Abingdon, UK: Routledge. ISBN 978-0-7546-6708-7.
- Reising, Russell (2006). "Vacio Luminoso: 'Tomorrow Never Knows' and the Coherence of the Impossible". In Womack, Kenneth; Davis, Todd F. (eds.). Reading the Beatles: Cultural Studies, Literary Criticism, and the Fab Four. Albany, NY: State University of New York Press. ISBN 0-7914-6716-3.
- Reising, Russell; LeBlanc, Jim (2009). "Magical Mystery Tours, and Other Trips: Yellow submarines, newspaper taxis, and the Beatles' psychedelic years". In Womack, Kenneth (ed.). The Cambridge Companion to the Beatles. Cambridge, UK: Cambridge University Press. ISBN 978-0-521-68976-2.
- Reising, Russell; LeBlanc, Jim (2016) [2008]. "Within and Without: Sgt. Pepper's Lonely Hearts Club Band and psychedelic insight". In Julien, Olivier (ed.). Sgt. Pepper and the Beatles: It Was Forty Years Ago Today. Abingdon, UK: Routledge. ISBN 978-0-7546-6708-7.
- Riley, Tim (1988). Tell Me Why: The Beatles: Album By Album, Song By Song, The Sixties And After. New York, NY: Alfred A. Knopf. ISBN 978-0-394-55061-9.
- Rodriguez, Robert (2012). Revolver: How the Beatles Reimagined Rock 'n' Roll. Milwaukee, WI: Backbeat Books. ISBN 978-1-61713-009-0.
- Schaffner, Nicholas (1978). The Beatles Forever. New York, NY: McGraw-Hill. ISBN 0-07-055087-5.
- Shankar, Ravi (1999). Raga Mala: The Autobiography of Ravi Shankar. New York, NY: Welcome Rain. ISBN 1-56649-104-5.
- Spizer, Bruce (2003). The Beatles on Apple Records. New Orleans, LA: 498 Productions. ISBN 0-9662649-4-0.
- Tillery, Gary (2011). Working Class Mystic: A Spiritual Biography of George Harrison. Wheaton, IL: Quest Books. ISBN 978-0-8356-0900-5.
- Turner, Steve (2016). Beatles '66: The Revolutionary Year. New York, NY: HarperLuxe. ISBN 978-0-06-249713-0.
- Womack, Kenneth (2007). Long and Winding Roads: The Evolving Artistry of the Beatles. New York, NY: Continuum. ISBN 978-0-8264-1746-6.
- Womack, Kenneth (2014). The Beatles Encyclopedia: Everything Fab Four. Santa Barbara, CA: ABC-CLIO. ISBN 978-0-313-39171-2.
- World Music: The Rough Guide (Volume 2: Latin and North America, Caribbean, India, Asia and Pacific). London: Rough Guides/Penguin. 2000. ISBN 1-85828-636-0.
- Wright, Gary (2014). Dream Weaver: A Memoir; Music, Meditation, and My Friendship with George Harrison. New York, NY: Tarcher/Penguin. ISBN 978-0-399-16523-8.
