= Por Siempre Beatles =

Compilation album by the Beatles
- Released: 8 October 1971
- Recorded: 1964–1968
- Genre: Rock, pop
- Label: Odeon
- Producer: George Martin

The Beatles chronology
| The Beatles' Christmas Album (1970) | Por Siempre Beatles (1971) | 1962–1966 (1973) |

Por Siempre Beatles is a compilation album by the English rock group the Beatles, released in 1971 in Spain (as EMI/Odeon J060-04973) and Latin America. It contains various songs from 1964 to 1968 that had not appeared on a British studio album by the Beatles.

== Background and song selection ==
Por Siempre Beatles – the title of which translates as Forever Beatles or Beatles Forever – was notable for the inclusion of the songs "The Inner Light" and "I'm Down", the B-sides to "Lady Madonna" and "Help!", respectively. By 1971, these two tracks, together with the 1970 B-side "You Know My Name (Look Up the Number)" (which was not included on Por Siempre), were the only Beatles songs that had not appeared on one of the group's UK or US albums. The Spanish compilation therefore became highly sought after by Beatles collectors.

While "I'm Down" was included on the 1976 Capitol Records compilation Rock 'n' Roll Music, Por Siempre continued to be the only album among all the Beatles LP releases around the world to include "The Inner Light". The song subsequently appeared on a bonus disc in Parlophone's 1978 box set The Beatles Collection, and then on the spin-off release, Rarities, in 1979. As a result, interest in the Spanish compilation waned among collectors.

Although none of the twelve tracks on Por Siempre Beatles had appeared on an official British studio album by the Beatles, "Day Tripper" and "We Can Work It Out" were included on the 1966 UK compilation A Collection of Beatles Oldies, while "The Fool on the Hill", "Strawberry Fields Forever", "Your Mother Should Know", "Penny Lane", "Baby, You're a Rich Man" and "Blue Jay Way" all appeared on the American Magical Mystery Tour LP. The latter, while widely available as an import in Britain since 1967, received an official release there through Parlophone in 1976. "I Call Your Name" and "Yes It Is" had been issued on American albums during the 1960s – The Beatles' Second Album and Beatles VI, respectively.

== Track listing ==
All songs by Lennon–McCartney, except tracks 11 and 12 by George Harrison.

Side one

1. "Day Tripper"
2. "Yes It Is"
3. "I'm Down"
4. "The Fool on the Hill"
5. "Strawberry Fields Forever"
6. "We Can Work It Out"

Side two

7. "Your Mother Should Know"
8. "Penny Lane"
9. "Baby, You're a Rich Man"
10. "I Call Your Name"
11. "The Inner Light"
12. "Blue Jay Way"
