= Lamps of Fire =

Religious writings anthology

- Author: Juan Mascaró
- Publication date: 1958

Lamps of Fire - the Spirit of Religions is an anthology of religious writings compiled, and often translated, by Juan Mascaró.

== Synopsis ==
After a preface by Mascaró, the book is divided into four sections each filled with numbered selections. The first section, The Spirit of Religions, contains selections from the scriptures of each of the major world religions: Hinduism, Zoroastrianism, Buddhism, Jainism, Taoism, Confucianism, Shintoism, Judaism, Christianity, Islam and Sikhism. The other three chapters are based around the themes of Light, Love and Life.

In all there are 300 selections, each given a title. After the scriptures in the first chapter, the selections in the subsequent chapters broaden to include writings by mystics and poets. The Bible and the Tao De Ching are the two scriptures most fully represented, while the saint most frequently quoted is St John of the Cross.

== Composition and publication ==
Mascaró explains his selections in a preface where he maintains that all the passages are lamps of fire that all merge into what John of the Cross called "the lamp of the being of God" (a passage from the Spanish saint's poem The Living Flame of Love and the 108th selection in the book). The book, he writes, contains words of vision and faith which can become "a light in deep darkness and a refuge in the storm". Many of the passages are translated or rendered by the author. Mascaró's obituary in The Times explained that a collection of mystical poetry was entirely natural product from one who "believed that the poetic and the spiritual were one; that religious truth could only be expressed through poetry."

The first edition of Lamps of Fire was limited to 200 copies in 1958 retailing at 4 guineas. In 1961 Methuen & Co. Ltd. published a cheaper version at 21 shillings. There was a reprint of the book in 1972 and a later edition was published in Mascaro's native Catalan shortly before his death in 1986.

== Reception ==
The Times Literary Supplement gave the book a positive review. The review commented on the combination of art and scholarship in Mascaró's translations and the depth of spiritual insight that ensured every passage would enrich readers' understanding. The reviewer also commended Mascaró on the range of his selections across history and geography and the inclusion of lesser known names.

== Lamps of Fire and George Harrison ==
The 48th selection, entitled "The Inner Light", was used by George Harrison as the lyrics for a song by The Beatles of the same name. Mascaró had sent George Harrison a copy of the book in mid-November 1967 in response to a letter from Harrison. Mascaró's accompanying letter explained that he had recently been introduced to The Beatles song "Within You Without You" by friends and had been moved by the song's message. In a post script, Mascaró wonders if it "might not be interesting to put into your music a few words of Tao" before suggesting selection 48 from his book (rendered by Mascaró). Harrison travelled to Bombay, India in January 1968 to record Indian musicians for the soundtrack of a film, Wonderwall. During these sessions he also set Mascaró's suggested passage to music. After some additional work in London the following month, the song was released as a B-side to the single "Lady Madonna" on 15 March 1968.

Mascaró had first met Harrison on 4 October 1967 when they both appeared on The Frost Programme television show. Harrison and John Lennon were brought in to discuss Transcendental Meditation (TM) with a panel of experts that included Mascaró, Dr. John Allison, a group of Quakers and the author and lawyer John Mortimer, who took the atheistic side of the debate.
