= Groovin' with the Soulful Strings =

Studio album by the Soulful Strings
- Released: October 1967
- Recorded: June–July 1967; Ter Mar Studios, Chicago
- Genre: Soul-jazz, psychedelic rock
- Length: 34:44
- Label: Cadet
- Producer: Esmond Edwards

Singles from Groovin' with the Soulful Strings
- 1. "Burning Spear"

Groovin' with the Soulful Strings is the second album by the American soul-jazz instrumental group the Soulful Strings. It was released in October 1967 on the Cadet record label, a subsidiary of Chess Records. The album includes the hit single "Burning Spear", written by the group's leader, musical arranger Richard Evans, and interpretations of popular songs by the Beatles, the Temptations, Burt Bacharach and Hal David, and others.

Groovin' was the most commercially successful of the Soulful Strings' releases. In the United States, it peaked at number 59 on the Billboard Top LP's chart, and number 6 and number 2, respectively, on Billboard's best-selling R&B and Jazz LP listings. Although the album was nominally produced by Cadet Records senior executive Esmond Edwards, its success led to Evans' promotion to head up the creative direction of the label. In addition to the string orchestration, the recording features contributions from jazz musicians such as Phil Upchurch, Charles Stepney, Lenny Druss, Cleveland Eaton and Morris Jennings.

== Recording ==
The Soulful Strings recorded the album at Ter Mar Studios in Chicago in June and July 1967. Although the Strings were Richard Evans' project, Edwards was credited for "production and supervision" on the LP sleeve.

As on the group's debut, Paint It Black (1966), the musical content favored cover versions of popular songs. On Groovin', these included "Within You Without You", "Groovin'", "All Blues", "Alfie" and "(I Know) I'm Losing You". The musicians on the sessions were selected by Evans from the Cadet Records house band. Among the contributors, guitarist Ron Steele played the sitar on "Within You Without You".

The sole original composition on Groovin' was "Burning Spear", written by Evans. The song's arrangement features a kalimba, tribal-style drumming, and a prominent flute part (played by Lenny Druss), along with sections led by vibraphone and guitar.

== Release and reception ==
Groovin' with the Soulful Strings was released in the United States in October 1967, with the Cadet catalog number LPS-796. The LP sleeve included a liner note essay written by WSDM-FM (Chicago) DJ Yvonne Daniels. "Burning Spear", backed with "Within You Without You", was issued as a single from the album. It became the group's only single release to chart on the Billboard Hot 100, peaking at number 64, and placed at number 36 on Billboard's R&B Singles listings. The album reached number 59 on the Billboard Top LP's chart, and number 6 and number 2, respectively, on Billboard's best-selling R&B and Jazz LP listings.

Reviewing the album for AllMusic, Ryan Randall Goble writes: "The Soulful Strings set out to prove that strings can swing, and here they certainly do … Richard Evans' fresh arrangements hold the listeners' interest." Goble describes "All Blues" as "a stellar, albeit truncated, version" and concludes: "George Harrison's 'Within You Without You' … is the strangest yet most interesting track on the album. Some of The Soulful Strings' Groovin' sounds a bit banal and kitschy, but it's a lot of fun."

== Track listing ==
Side one

1. "Burning Spear" (Richard Evans) – 4:17
2. "All Blues" (Miles Davis) – 2:53
3. "What Now My Love" (Carl Sigman, Gilbert Bécaud, Pierre Delanoë) – 3:00
4. "Within You Without You" (George Harrison) – 4:20
5. "Our Day Will Come" (Bob Hilliard, Mort Garson) – 3:19

Side two

6. "Soul Prelude" (J.S. Bach) – 2:45
7. "Groovin'" (Felix Cavaliere, Eddie Brigati) – 3:08
8. "Alfie" (Burt Bacharach, Hal David) – 4:05
9. "Comin' Home Baby" (Ben Tucker, Bob Dorough) – 3:38
10. "(I Know) I'm Losing You" (Norman Whitfield, Eddie Holland, Cornelius Grant) – 3:19

== Personnel ==
- Richard Evans – musical arrangements, direction
- Sol Bobrov – viola
- David Chausow – viola
- Arthur Ahlman – violin
- Harold Kupper – violin
- Karl B. Fruh – cello
- Emil Mittermann – cello
- Theodore Ratzer – cello
- Charles Stepney – organ, vibraphone
- Lenny Druss – saxophone, flute
- Vernice Green – saxophone, flute
- Ronald Steele – guitar, sitar
- Phil Upchurch – guitar
- Cleveland Eaton – bass
- Louis Satterfield – bass
- Philip R. Thomas – bongos, congas
- Morris Jennings – drums
