= The Soulful Strings =

American soul-jazz instrumental group

- Origin: Chicago, Illinois
- Genres: Soul-jazz, psychedelic rock, funk
- Years active: 1966–1971
- Label: Cadet
- Past members: Richard Evans; Phil Upchurch; Charles Stepney; Lenard Druss; Cleveland Eaton; Morris Jennings; Bobby Christian; Sol Bobrov; Bruce Hayden; Billy Wooten

The Soulful Strings were an American soul-jazz instrumental group formed in Chicago in 1966. Predominantly a studio band, the project was created and led by Richard Evans, a staff producer and musical arranger with the Chess Records subsidiary Cadet Records.

The group comprised various members of Cadet's house band – such as Phil Upchurch (on guitar), Charles Stepney (organ, vibraphone), Lenny Druss (flute), Cleveland Eaton (bass, cello), Morris Jennings (drums), Bobby Christian (vibraphone, percussion) and, later, Billy Wooten, in place of Stepney. Sol Bobrov and Bruce Hayden were among the eponymous string players. Other contributors included Johnny Griffith and Donny Hathaway, both on keyboards, and jazz harpist Dorothy Ashby.

Between 1966 and 1971, the Soulful Strings released six studio albums, all recorded at Chess's Ter Mar Studios, and one live album. This period coincided with the peak of Cadet Records' influence, during which Green continued to produce other acts, including Ashby, Woody Herman and Marlena Shaw. Simultaneously, Stepney – often assisted by Upchurch, Christian and Jennings – also worked with the group Rotary Connection, recording for Chess's Cadet Concept label. As of October 2014, the Strings' catalog remained out of print, although their biggest US hit, "Burning Spear", was included on the 2004 Chess compilation Chicago Soul.

== Concept ==
The Soulful Strings' repertoire consisted mainly of cover versions, often given a musical interpretation that combined soul, jazz, funk and psychedelia. Speaking to an interviewer from Berklee College of Music, where he later worked as a professor teaching jazz arrangements, Evans attributed the ensemble's distinctive sound to his use of violas (rather than any violins) as lead string instruments, beside the cellos. He described the combination of two violas and four cellos as "a very dark sound".

In a 2009 interview with Wax Poetics magazine, Evans credited Chess co-founder Leonard Chess with initiating the strings-based concept; however, he added that the flute and guitar parts became a "driving force" as much as the string section. Larry Grogan, founding editor of the soul music website Funky16Corners, writes that although superficially the project might appear to be in the "easy listening/kitsch" category, their music reveals "[not] a Mantovani-esque vibe, but rather an energetic soul/funk/jazz rhythm section augmented (not overpowered) by strings".

== Career ==
The Soulful Strings' debut album, Paint It Black (1966), included covers of contemporary rock and pop songs such as the Rolling Stones' "Paint It Black", the Mamas & the Papas' "California Dreamin'" and the Byrds' "Eight Miles High". While commenting on the prominence of viola and flute in the arrangements, Billboard magazine's reviewer wrote: "The result is a surprise. Instead of harming the feel of the music, a new dimension is added."

The ensemble made its concert debut, as a thirteen-piece, with a series of shows at Chicago's London House nightclub in mid 1968. By the time the concerts were announced, the group's second album, Groovin' with the Soulful Strings (1967), had been on the US Billboard Top LP's chart for 33 weeks. It included the Evans-composed "Burning Spear", which was a top 40 hit on the Billboard R&B Singles listings. Among the other songs on the LP were covers of the Beatles' Indian-styled "Within You Without You", Miles Davis's "All Blues" and the Temptations' "(I Know) I'm Losing You". Their most successful album, Groovin' peaked at number 59 on the Top LP's chart and at number 6 and number 2, respectively, on Billboard's best-selling R&B and Jazz LPs.

Released in June 1968, Another Exposure featured interpretations of George and Ira Gershwin's "It Ain't Necessarily So", Otis Redding's "(Sittin' On) The Dock of the Bay", and three recent songs by the Beatles: "Hello, Goodbye", "Lady Madonna" and "The Inner Light". The album also included three Evans compositions, among them "The Stepper" and "Soul Message". Evans later said that the decision to issue "The Stepper" as a single, rather than the Stepney-arranged cover of Aretha Franklin's "Since You've Been Gone", led to difficulties in their working relationship.

In November that year, the Strings released The Magic of Christmas, a collection of traditional holiday-season songs. Back by Demand: The Soulful Strings in Concert (1969) was recorded live at London House over two nights in November 1968. Composed solely of cover versions, it included the Temptations' hit "I Wish It Would Rain", a reworking of Debussy's "Clair de Lune", as well as songs by Marvin Gaye and James Brown.

Breaking the pattern of their two previous releases, the group's 1969 studio LP, String Fever (often mis-titled as Spring Fever), focused on original material, producing tracks such as "Zambezi" and "Chocolate Candy". Aside from Evans' compositions, the album featured songs written by or with Hathaway and Upchurch. Grogan describes String Fever as, variously, "by far the best of the Soulful Strings albums" and "the group's masterpiece". Producer and DJ Kirk Degiorgio, in his role as an educator with the Red Bull Music Academy, similarly included "Zambezi" and "Chocolate Candy" on his playlist reflecting the best music from Evans' career.

The group's final LP, Play Gamble-Huff, consisted of cover versions of songs by Kenneth Gamble and Leon Huff. The album appeared in early 1971, by which point the Chess brothers had sold Chess Records and its subsidiaries to General Recorded Tape (GRT). In 1972, the GRT-owned Cadet label issued a compilation album by the group, a two-disc set titled The Best of the Soulful Strings.

== Discography ==
Release information per Both Sides Now Publications' Cadet Records discography (albums) and Funky16Corners (singles); all chart peaks from US charts compiled by Billboard magazine.

Albums

- Paint It Black – Cadet LPS-776 (1966); US #166, US R&B #25
- Groovin' with the Soulful Strings – Cadet LPS-796 (1967); US #59, US R&B #6, US Jazz #2
- Another Exposure – Cadet LPS-805 (1968); US #189, US R&B #43
- The Magic of Christmas – Cadet LPS-814 (1968); US Christmas #35
- Back by Demand: The Soulful Strings in Concert – Cadet LPS-820 (1969); US #125, US R&B #47
- String Fever – Cadet LPS-834 (1969); US #183, US Jazz #19
- Play Gamble-Huff – Cadet LPS-846 (1971)

Singles

- "The Sidewinder" / "Message to Michael" – Cadet 5540 (1966)
- "Paint It Black" / "Love Is a Hurtin' Thing" – Cadet 5559 (1967)
- "Burning Spear" / "Within You Without You" – Cadet 5576 (1967); US #64, US R&B #36
- "The Stepper" / "The Dock of the Bay" – Cadet 5607 (1968)
- "Jericho" / "The Who Who Song" – Cadet 5617 (1968)
- "I Wish It Would Rain" / "Listen Here" – Cadet 5633 (1969)
- "Zambezi" / "A Love Song" – Cadet 5654 (1969)
