= Love You To =

1966 song by the Beatles

- Cover of the Northern Songs sheet music

Song by the Beatles

from the album Revolver
- Released: 5 August 1966
- Recorded: 11 and 13 April 1966
- Studio: EMI, London
- Genre: Raga rock; Indian music; psychedelic rock
- Length: 3:09 (mono); 3:00 (stereo)
- Label: Parlophone
- Songwriter: George Harrison
- Producer: George Martin

"Love You To" is a song by the English rock band the Beatles from their 1966 album Revolver. The song was written and sung by George Harrison and features Indian instrumentation such as sitar and tabla. Following Harrison's introduction of the sitar on "Norwegian Wood (This Bird Has Flown)" in 1965, it was the first Beatles song to fully reflect the influence of Indian classical music. The recording was made with minimal participation from Harrison's bandmates; instead, he created the track with tabla player Anil Bhagwat and other Indian musicians from the Asian Music Circle in London.

The composition adheres to the pitches of the Indian equivalent of Dorian mode and emulates the khyal vocal tradition of Hindustani classical music. For musical inspiration, Harrison drew from the work of master sitarist Ravi Shankar, who became his sitar tutor shortly after the recording was completed. In its lyrical themes, "Love You To" is partly a love song to Harrison's wife, Pattie Boyd, while also incorporating philosophical concepts inspired by his experimentation with the hallucinogenic drug LSD. In the context of its release, the song served as one of the first examples of the Beatles expressing an ideology aligned with that of the emergent counterculture.

"Love You To" has been hailed by musicologists and critics as groundbreaking in its presentation of a non-Western musical form to rock audiences, particularly with regard to authenticity and avoidance of parody. Author Jonathan Gould describes the song's slow sitar introduction as "one of the most brazenly exotic acts of stylistic experimentation ever heard on a popular LP". Ronnie Montrose, Bongwater, Jim James and Cornershop are among the artists who have covered "Love You To".

== Background and inspiration ==
To me, [Indian classical music] is the only really great music now, and it makes Western three-or-four-beat type stuff seem somehow dead. You can get so much more out of it if you are prepared really to concentrate and listen.

— George Harrison, 1966

On the 1965 album Rubber Soul, George Harrison had led the Beatles towards Indian classical music through his use of the Indian sitar on John Lennon's song "Norwegian Wood (This Bird Has Flown)", while his own composition "If I Needed Someone" reflected the genre's influence in its melody and suggestion of drone. He subsequently wrote "Love You To" as a way to showcase the sitar, and to feature the tabla, a pair of Indian hand drums, for the first time. Music critic Richie Unterberger describes the song as the Beatles' "first all-out excursion" in raga rock, a genre that author Nicholas Schaffner says was "launched" by Harrison's use of sitar on "Norwegian Wood".

Harrison wrote "Love You To" in early 1966 while the Beatles were enjoying an unusually long period free of professional commitments, due to their inability to find a suitable film project. He used the available time to further explore his interest in Indian music and the sitar, which, journalist Maureen Cleave noted in a contemporary article, "has given new meaning to [his] life". Aside from honeymooning in Barbados with his wife, English model Pattie Boyd, Harrison's activities included receiving sitar tuition from an Indian musician at the Asian Music Circle (AMC) in north London, where he also attended music recitals, and seeing Indian sitarist Ravi Shankar perform at the Royal Festival Hall. As reflected in "Love You To", Harrison continued to immerse himself in recordings by Shankar, who, when the pair met in June 1966, would agree to take Harrison as his student. This meeting took place at the home of the AMC's founders, Ayana and Patricia Angadi, whose network of friends and visitors added to Harrison's self-education in new forms of art, culture and politics.

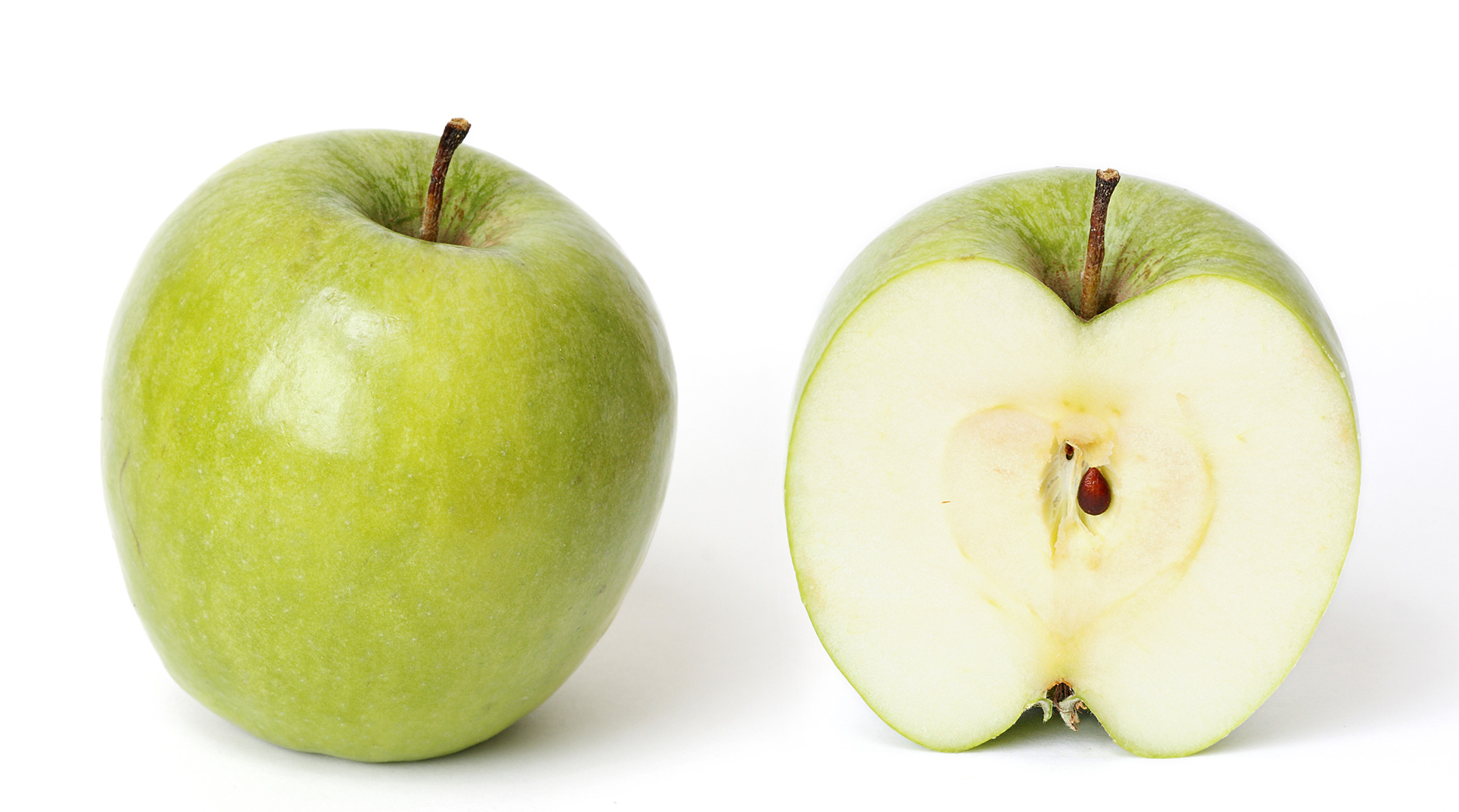
The song's working title, "Granny Smith", referenced the same variety of apple that the Beatles later adopted for the logo of their company Apple Corps.

Typically of his songs over this period, Harrison was unable to commit to naming the new composition. At the start of the sessions for the Beatles' Revolver album, Geoff Emerick, the band's recording engineer, gave the song the working title of "Granny Smith", after the variety of apple. (Note: This temporary title remained in place until the completion of Revolver, on 22 June 1966.) The song was partly inspired by Harrison's experimentation with the hallucinogenic drug LSD, which he credited as a catalyst for increased awareness and his interest in Eastern philosophical concepts. Author Ian MacDonald views the subject matter as "part philosophical" and "part love-song" to Boyd.

== Composition ==
=== Musical form ===
"Love You To" is in the key of C and adheres to the pitches of Kafi thaat, the Indian equivalent of Dorian mode. The composition emulates the khyal vocal tradition of Hindustani (or North Indian) classical music. Structurally, it comprises an opening alap; a gat section, which serves as the main portion of the song; and a short drut (fast) gat to close the piece.

The alap consists of sitar played in free tempo, during which the song's melody is previewed in the style of an Indian raga. Described by Harrison biographer Simon Leng as "essentially an adaptation of a blues lick", the seven-note motif that closes the alap serves as a recurring motif during the ensuing gat. The change of metre following the alap marks the first such example in the Beatles' work; it would shortly be repeated in Lennon's composition "She Said She Said", which Harrison helped complete by joining together three separate pieces that Lennon had written.

The gat is set in madhya laya (medium tempo) and features a driving rock rhythm accentuated by heavy tambura drone. This portion of the composition consists of eight-bar "A" sections and twelve-bar "B" sections, structured in an A-B-A-B pattern. The alap's lack of a distinct time signature is contrasted with a temporal reference in the lyrics to the opening verse: "Each day just goes so fast / I turn around, it's past". Throughout, the vocal line avoids the melodic embellishment typical of khyal, apart from the use of melisma over the last line in each of the A sections. In keeping with the minimal harmonic movement of Indian music, the composition's only deviation from its I chord of C is a series of implied ♭VII chord changes, which occur in the B sections.

During the mid-song instrumental passage, the melody line of the sitar incorporates aspects of the alap, raising the melody previewed there by an octave. The song then returns to verses sung over the A and B sections, culminating in the line "I'll make love to you, if you want me to." The arrival of the drut gat follows Hindustani convention by ending the composition at an accelerated tempo, although the brevity of this segment marks a departure from the same tradition.

=== Lyrical interpretation ===
As with all of the songs written by Harrison or Lennon and recorded by the Beatles in 1966, the lyrics to "Love You To" marked a departure from the standard love-song themes that had defined the group's previous work. Harrison presents a worldview that variously reflects cynicism, sardonic humour and a degree of detachment with regard to personal relationships. According to music critic John Harris, the lines "There's people standing round / Who'll screw you in the ground / They'll fill you in with all the sins you'll see" serve as one of the first examples of the Beatles' ideology aligning with that of the emerging 1960s counterculture, by highlighting the division between traditional mores and an LSD-inspired perspective. (Note: Harris cites Lennon's similar demarcation between "groovers and squares" in "Rain" as the other example of the Beatles first espousing countercultural principles.) Authors Russell Reising and Jim LeBlanc recognise this and other statements in "Love You To" as part of the Beatles' espousal of anti-materialism from 1966 onwards, a message that, inspired by the LSD experience, suggested a "psychedelic vision of society".

Among other commentators discussing the lyrical themes, Mark Hertsgaard writes that Harrison's "response to the fleetingness of time was to affirm and celebrate life: 'make love all day long / make love singing songs'", while Robert Rodriguez describes "Love You To" as "a somewhat oblique expression of love directed toward his bride, along with larger concerns regarding mortality and purpose". (Note: In his interview with Cleave in February 1966, Harrison said that Boyd had been urging him to "write more beautiful words". Referring to a couplet in "Love You To", a demo of which Harrison played during their meeting, Cleave wrote: "'Love me while you can; before I'm a dead old man.' George was aware that these words were not beautiful.") In Ian Inglis' estimation, the lyrics "remind us that in a world of material dissatisfaction and moral disharmony, there is always the solace of sexual pleasure".

== Recording ==
"Love You To" was the third track the Beatles recorded for Revolver, after "Tomorrow Never Knows" and "Got to Get You into My Life". Rodriguez comments that "Love You To" "[made] explicit the Indian influence implicit throughout the entire album", as songs such as "Tomorrow Never Knows" and "Got to Get You into My Life", together with the non-album single tracks "Paperback Writer" and "Rain", all incorporate drone sounds or otherwise display the limited harmonic movement that typifies the genre. (Note: In addition, "Rain" and "I Want to Tell You" include the vocal melismas commonly used in Indian composition. Indian musical stylings similarly feature in the guitar solos on "I'm Only Sleeping" and "Taxman".) In a 1997 interview, Harrison said that the song's inclusion reflected the band's willingness to experiment during this period, adding: "We were listening to all sorts of things, Stockhausen, avant-garde music, whatever, and most of it made its way onto our records."

The basic track for "Love You To" was taped in London at EMI Studios (now Abbey Road Studios) on 11 April 1966. According to Beatles historian Mark Lewisohn, Harrison initially sang and played acoustic guitar, accompanied by Paul McCartney on backing vocals. By the end of the first session that day, three takes of the song had been made, with Harrison introducing his sitar on the last of these takes. Work resumed at 8 pm, with the participation of Anil Bhagwat, a tabla player that Harrison had sourced through Patricia Angadi. Other outside contributors, also from the AMC, included musicians on tambura and sitar.

A chap called [Ayana] Angadi called me and asked if I was free that evening to work with George ... he didn't say it was Harrison. It was only when a Rolls-Royce came to pick me up that I realised I'd be playing on a Beatles session. When I arrived at Abbey Road there were girls everywhere with Thermos flasks, cakes, sandwiches, waiting for the Beatles to come out.

— Anil Bhagwat, 1988

According to Inglis, "Love You To" is "defined" by the interplay between sitar and tabla. Bhagwat later recalled of his involvement: "George told me what he wanted and I tuned the tabla with him. He suggested I play something in the Ravi Shankar style, 16-beats, though he agreed that I should improvise. Indian music is all improvisation." After rehearsing the song together many times, Harrison and Bhagwat recorded the sitar and tabla parts onto the vocal and guitar performance taped earlier that day. (Note: A portrait artist, Patricia Angadi sketched the pair as they rehearsed, having painted Harrison and Boyd's wedding portrait earlier in the year.)

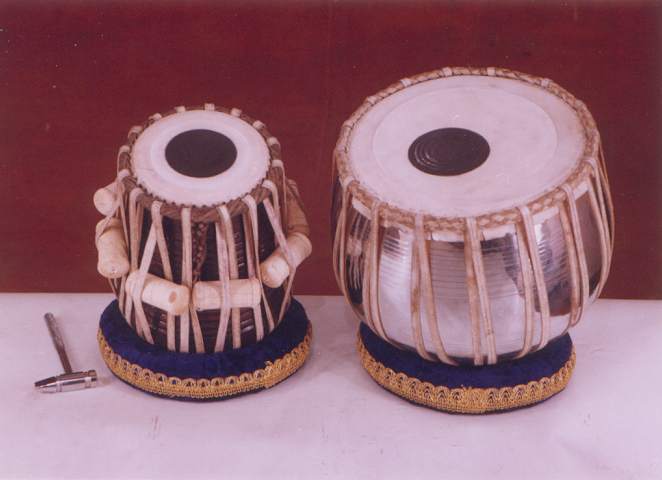
The track makes extensive use of the double hand-drum tabla, along with sitar.

With take 6 selected as the best performance, a reduction mix was carried out on 13 April, freeing up space for more overdubs on the four-track tape. Harrison added another vocal part onto what was now referred to as take 7, and Ringo Starr played tambourine. McCartney contributed a high harmony vocal over the words "They'll fill you in with all their sins, you'll see", but this part was omitted from the final mix. (Note: McCartney's singing was retained elsewhere in the verses, however. Although Lennon shared Harrison's interest in Indian music, he is not thought to have participated in the recording of "Love You To".) Harrison also overdubbed fuzz-tone electric guitar, controlling the output via a volume pedal. Producer Tony Visconti has marvelled at the guitar sounds the Beatles introduced on Revolver, particularly Harrison's part on "Love You To", which he says "sounds like a chainsaw cutting down a tree in Vermont".

Credit for the main sitar part on "Love You To" has traditionally been the subject of debate among commentators. While MacDonald says that, rather than Harrison, it was the sitarist from the AMC who played this part, Rodriguez writes that "others point to [Harrison's] single-minded diligence in mastering the instrument, as well as his study through private lessons, proximity to accomplished musicians, and close listening to pertinent records." In his official history of the Beatles' recording career, The Complete Beatles Recording Sessions, Lewisohn states: "George played the sitar but an outside musician, Anil Bhagwat, was recruited to play the tabla." Musicologist Walter Everett also identifies Harrison as the main sitar player on the recording, as does Peter Lavezzoli, author of The Dawn of Indian Music in the West. Leng comments that, as on "Norwegian Wood", Harrison "is still playing the sitar like a guitar player [on the recording], using blues and rock 'n' roll bends rather than the intensely intricate Indian equivalents". (Note: In Everett's estimation, the part on "Love You To" "would have required knowledge of no rag[a]s and only an elementary understanding of Hindustani formal patterns, easily attainable by a good guitarist within a few weeks". Harrison said he had "made some strides" as a sitarist since the recording of "Norwegian Wood".) Speaking to author Steve Turner, Bhagwat has dismissed the idea that the sitarist was not Harrison, saying: "I can tell you here and now – 100 percent it was George on sitar throughout."

Final mixing for the song took place on 21 June as the Beatles rushed to complete Revolver before beginning the first leg of their 1966 world tour. Harrison discussed "Love You To" with Shankar when the two musicians met that month, at a social event hosted by the Angadi family. Although he was unaware of the band's popularity and had yet to hear "Norwegian Wood", Shankar was impressed with Harrison's humility as the guitarist downplayed his sitar recordings with the Beatles as merely "experiments". (Note: Shankar was later dismissive of the link made during the 1960s between Indian music and the prevailing liberal attitude towards sex and drugs. After "Love You To", according to Lavezzoli, Harrison "took greater care" when writing the lyrics to his next Indian-style song, "Within You Without You", which was influenced by his introduction to Vedic philosophy while in India with Shankar over September–October 1966.) Soon after this meeting, Shankar gave Harrison his first sitar lesson at Kinfauns, his and Boyd's home in Surrey, and later, with tablist Alla Rakha, performed a private recital there for Harrison, Lennon and Starr. Harrison subsequently recalled of his first lesson with Shankar: "I felt I wanted to walk out of my home that day and take a one-way ticket to Calcutta. I would even have left Pattie behind in that moment."

== Release ==
Revolver was released on 5 August 1966, with "Love You To" sequenced as the fourth track. (Note: On the abbreviated US version of Revolver, it appeared as the third track, since Capitol Records had already issued "I'm Only Sleeping" on the North American release Yesterday and Today. American pressings of Revolver also differed by mis-titling the song "Love You Too".) In advance of the release, EMI had issued the songs to radio stations throughout July, in increments, to prepare the Beatles' audience for the progression the band had made with their latest work. According to cultural historian Simon Philo, the album represented "pop's most sustained deployment of Indian instruments, musical form and even religious philosophy thus far – which all came together most notably on ['Love You To']". By that point, the Beatles' association with Indian music had been firmly established, after, at Harrison's suggestion, the band stopped over in Delhi on the return flight from their concerts in the Far East. During the highly publicised visit, all four members of the group bought musical instruments from Rikhi Ram & Sons in Connaught Place. (Note: Having used a cheap model purchased from the Indiacraft store in London for "Norwegian Wood" and "Love You To", Harrison bought a top-quality sitar in Delhi, along with some other Indian instruments.) Bhagwat's name appeared on the LP's back cover, one of the few times that an outside musician received an official credit on a Beatles album.

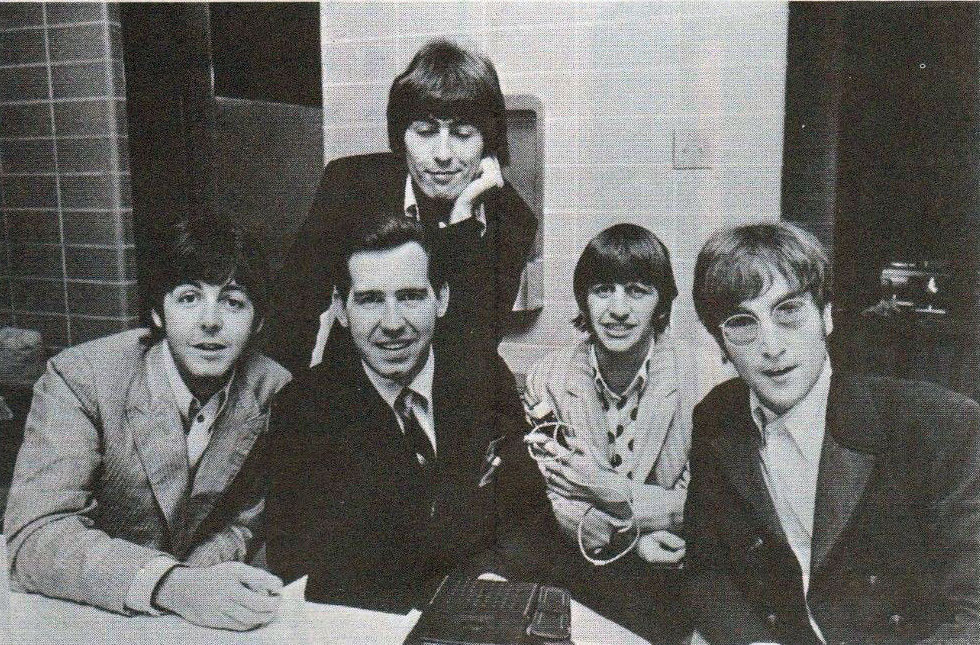
Harrison (top) in August 1966 with his Beatles bandmates and American disc jockey Jim Stagg

Among commentators recalling the song's release, Peter Doggett describes "Love You To" as having "sounded astonishing next to the electrifying pop of the Revolver album". Hertsgaard writes: "what caught most people's interest was the exotic rhythm track. The opening descent of shimmering harplike notes beckoned even those who resisted Indian music, while the lyrics melded the mysticism of the East ... with the pragmatism of the West, and the hedonism of youth culture." (Note: Author Jonathan Gould describes the song's introduction as "filled with croaking drones, pregnant pauses and softly elasticized notes", and highlights it as "one of the most brazenly exotic acts of stylistic experimentation ever heard on a popular LP".)

In his 1977 book The Beatles Forever, Schaffner wrote that, next to the dominant Lennon–McCartney songwriting partnership, Harrison's three compositions on Revolver – "Love You To", "Taxman" and "I Want to Tell You" – "offered ample indication that there were now three prolific songwriting Beatles". Schaffner also commented that, through his championing of the sitar and Shankar's music, Harrison came to be seen as "the maharaja of raga-rock" among Western musicians. (Note: Schaffner considered "Love You To" to be "sprawling and listless", however, in comparison to other examples of "Beatle raga-rock" – namely, "Norwegian Wood" and Harrison's later compositions "Within You Without You" and "The Inner Light".) In the Beatles' 1968 animated film Yellow Submarine, a brief portion of the song is used to introduce Harrison's character, as a guru-like figure, standing on a hill.

== Critical reception ==
In a joint album review with Peter Jones for Record Mirror, Richard Green enthused about "Love You To", saying: "Starts like a classical Indian recital ... This is great. So different. Play it again! Best [track] so far." As an example of what Turner views as older pop journalists being unable to evaluate the new progressive music of 1966, Allen Evans of the NME described the song as an "Oriental-sounding piece" with "sitar jangles" and a "Kama Sutra-type lyric". Melody Maker's reviewer lauded Harrison's sitar playing as "stunning" and "tremendous" before concluding: "Fascinating mixture of minor melody with Indian accompaniment. One of the most striking tracks."

Disc and Music Echo's review of Revolver took the form of a track-by-track rundown by Ray Davies of the Kinks, whose July 1965 single "See My Friends" became widely viewed as one of the first pop songs to incorporate Eastern elements. In his comments on "Love You To", Davies said that Harrison "must have quite a big influence on the group now", adding that "it's well performed which is always true of a Beatles track." Davies also said: "This sort of song I was doing two years ago – now I'm doing what the Beatles were doing two years ago." (Note: Turner writes that this last comment, as with several others in the Disc article, reflected the bitterness Davies had felt towards the Beatles since 1964, and that Harrison was the only Beatle to publicly recognise the Kinks as equals. In a 1988 interview, Davies recalled the 1960s music scene as "incredible ... The Beatles were waiting for the next Kinks album while the Who were waiting for the next Beatles record.")

Writing in the recently launched Crawdaddy!, Paul Williams "heaped praise" on "Love You To", according to Rodriguez. The majority of contemporary US reviews were lukewarm towards Revolver, however, in reaction to the publication of Lennon's comment to Maureen Cleave that the Beatles had become more popular than Christ. An exception was New York critic Richard Goldstein, who praised the album as "a revolutionary record", and later wrote that the song's lyrics "exploded with a passionate sutra quality". While bemoaning the initial lack of recognition for Revolver, KRLA Beat's reviewer said that Harrison had "created a new extension of the music form which he introduced in Rubber Soul", and described "Love You To" as "Well done and musically valid. Also musically unrecognized."

== Retrospective assessment and legacy ==
While it was the songs and voices of Lennon and McCartney that led the Beatles to enduring influence, Harrison's embrace of Indian music added a welcome, if wholly unexpected, note to the proceedings, instantly and forever changing Western awareness of the Asian subcontinent.

— Ira Robbins, 2001

Writing in the journal Asian Music, ethnomusicologist David Reck has cited "Love You To" as being revolutionary in Western culture, adding: "One cannot emphasise how absolutely unprecedented this piece is in the history of popular music. For the first time an Asian music was not parodied utilising familiar stereotypes and misconceptions, but rather transferred in toto into a new environment with sympathy and rare understanding." Reck views it as the first in "a series of finely crafted Indian-based songs" by Harrison that would extend through his solo career, and while admiring the range of authentic Hindustani musical elements in the composition, he concludes: "All of this in a three-minute song!" Peter Lavezzoli describes "Love You To" as "the first conscious attempt in pop to emulate a non-Western form of music in structure and instrumentation", while Reck calls it "the first song in the Euro-American pop music canon that is scored predominantly for Asian musical instruments, [with] sitar, tabla and tambura replacing rock band guitars, keyboards, bass and drums". Lavezzoli says of the sitar part: "[Harrison's] playing throughout the song is an astonishing improvement over 'Norwegian Wood'. In fact, 'Love You To' remains the most accomplished performance on sitar by any rock musician."

Music critic Lester Bangs termed "Love You To" "the first injection of ersatz Eastern wisdom into rock", while Peter Doggett credits Harrison's spiritual concerns with inspiring "an entire [new] genre of songwriting". The song has been recognised as a precursor to the world music genre. Through the success of Revolver in 1966, it was a key factor in the rise in popularity of Indian classical music among contemporary Western youth. In addition, the song inspired other rock musicians to experiment with non-Western instruments and tones, and so helped expand the scope of raga rock, while its mix of Indian instrumentation and distorted electric guitar was highly influential in the development of 1960s psychedelic music.

Reviewing Harrison's musical career in a 2002 issue of Goldmine magazine, Dave Thompson wrote that "Love You To" "opened creative doors through which Harrison's bandmates may not – and [George] Martin certainly would not – have ever dreamed of passing". Rolling Stone contributor Greg Kot pairs it with "Taxman" as two "major contributions" that saw Harrison "[come] into his own as a songwriter" on Revolver. Kot describes "Love You To" as "a boldly experimental track" and "the first full-scale incorporation of Eastern instruments on a Beatles album". (Note: Reviewing Martin Scorsese's 2011 documentary George Harrison: Living in the Material World, Joseph Jon Lanthier of Slant Magazine described "Love You To" as a "groundbreaking Eastern homage" and rued that Scorsese had overlooked the song in favour of discussing "Within You Without You".)

AllMusic editor Stephen Thomas Erlewine considers "Love You To" to be Harrison's "first and best foray into Indian music", while Bruce Eder, also writing for AllMusic, views it as "exquisite". In his song review for the same website, Richie Unterberger is unimpressed with the track; while acknowledging that "Love You To" was "Undoubtedly ... another indication of the group's rapidly broadening barriers", he cites a lead vocal that "drone[s] on in a rather lugubrious way", Harrison's slightly "disheveled" sitar playing, and lyrics that constitute "a rather muddled mix of free love advocacy, meditations on the transience of life on Earth, and chip-on-the-shoulder wariness of people out to exploit him". Although he finds the melody "sourly repetitious", Ian MacDonald writes that the track is "distinguished by the authenticity of its Hindustani classical instrumentation and techniques", and admires Harrison's understanding of the genre. In a 2009 review for Paste magazine, Mark Kemp described Revolver as the album on which the Beatles "completed their transformation from the mop tops of three years earlier into bold, groundbreaking experimental rockers", and added: "Harrison's 'Love You To' is pure Indian raga – sitar and tablas punctuated by the occasional luminous guitar riff jolting through the song's paranoid, drug-fueled lyrics like a blinding ray of sun into a dark forest."

== Cover versions ==
The Trypes, an offshoot of the Feelies, covered "Love You To" on their 1984 EP The Explorers Hold. A version of the song was covered by Ronnie Montrose, that included a rare vocal performance by the guitarist, on his 1986 album Territory. The song has also been covered by experimental rock band Bongwater on their 1988 debut album Double Bummer.

My Morning Jacket singer Jim James performed "Love You To" on a banjo for his 2009 EP Tribute To, a collection of Harrison songs that James recorded shortly after the former Beatle's death in November 2001. Mojo included James's version on Harrison Covered, a tribute CD accompanying the November 2011 issue of the magazine. In 2012, Cornershop recorded it for Mojo's multi-artist compilation Yellow Submarine Resurfaces.

== Personnel ==
According to Kenneth Womack and Ian MacDonald: (Note: Consistent with his querying the extent of Harrison's sitar playing on the track, MacDonald includes a question mark after the sitar credit he gives Harrison, as he does for McCartney's vocal credit. In his list of personnel, Womack adds bass guitar to Harrison's sitar and guitar contributions.)

The Beatles

- George Harrison – lead and backing vocals, acoustic guitar, sitar, rhythm guitar, fuzz-tone lead guitar
- Paul McCartney – backing vocal
- Ringo Starr – tambourine

Additional musicians

- Anil Bhagwat – tabla
- Unnamed musicians from the Asian Music Circle – sitar, tambura

== Sources ==
- The Beatles (2000). The Beatles Anthology. San Francisco, CA: Chronicle Books. ISBN 0-8118-2684-8.
- Castleman, Harry; Podrazik, Walter J. (1976). All Together Now: The First Complete Beatles Discography 1961–1975. New York, NY: Ballantine Books. ISBN 0-345-25680-8.
- Clayson, Alan (2003). George Harrison. London: Sanctuary. ISBN 1-86074-489-3.
- The Editors of Rolling Stone (2002). Harrison. New York, NY: Rolling Stone Press. ISBN 978-0-7432-3581-5.
- Everett, Walter (1999). The Beatles as Musicians: Revolver Through the Anthology. New York, NY: Oxford University Press. ISBN 0-19-512941-5.
- Gould, Jonathan (2007). Can't Buy Me Love: The Beatles, Britain and America. London: Piatkus. ISBN 978-0-7499-2988-6.
- Greene, Joshua M. (2006). Here Comes the Sun: The Spiritual and Musical Journey of George Harrison. Hoboken, NJ: John Wiley & Sons. ISBN 978-0-470-12780-3.
- Harrison, George (2002) [1980]. I, Me, Mine. San Francisco, CA: Chronicle Books. ISBN 978-0-8118-5900-4.
- Hertsgaard, Mark (1996). A Day in the Life: The Music and Artistry of the Beatles. London: Pan Books. ISBN 0-330-33891-9.
- Inglis, Ian (2010). The Words and Music of George Harrison. Santa Barbara, CA: Praeger. ISBN 978-0-313-37532-3.
- Kruth, John (2015). This Bird Has Flown: The Enduring Beauty of Rubber Soul Fifty Years On. Milwaukee, WI: Backbeat Books. ISBN 978-1-6171-3573-6.
- Lavezzoli, Peter (2006). The Dawn of Indian Music in the West. New York, NY: Continuum. ISBN 0-8264-2819-3.
- Leng, Simon (2006). While My Guitar Gently Weeps: The Music of George Harrison. Milwaukee, WI: Hal Leonard. ISBN 978-1-4234-0609-9.
- Lewisohn, Mark (2005) [1988]. The Complete Beatles Recording Sessions: The Official Story of the Abbey Road Years 1962–1970. London: Bounty Books. ISBN 978-0-7537-2545-0.
- MacDonald, Ian (1998). Revolution in the Head: The Beatles' Records and the Sixties. London: Pimlico. ISBN 978-0-7126-6697-8.
- Miles, Barry (2001). The Beatles Diary Volume 1: The Beatles Years. London: Omnibus Press. ISBN 0-7119-8308-9.
- Mojo Special Limited Edition: 1000 Days That Shook the World (The Psychedelic Beatles – April 1, 1965 to December 26, 1967). London: Emap. 2002.
- Pedler, Dominic (2003). The Songwriting Secrets of the Beatles. London: Omnibus Press. ISBN 978-0-7119-8167-6.
- Philo, Simon (2015). British Invasion: The Crosscurrents of Musical Influence. Lanham, MD: Rowman & Littlefield. ISBN 978-0-8108-8626-1.
- Reck, David (2016) [2008]. "The Beatles and Indian Music". In Julien, Olivier (ed.). Sgt. Pepper and the Beatles: It Was Forty Years Ago Today. Abingdon, UK: Routledge. ISBN 978-0-7546-6708-7.
- Reck, David B. (2009). "India/South India". In Titon, Jeff Todd (ed.). Worlds of Music: An Introduction to the Music of the World's Peoples (5th edn). Belmont, CA: Schirmer Cengage Learning. ISBN 978-0-534-59539-5.
- Reising, Russell; LeBlanc, Jim (2009). "Magical Mystery Tours, and Other Trips: Yellow submarines, newspaper taxis, and the Beatles' psychedelic years". In Womack, Kenneth (ed.). The Cambridge Companion to the Beatles. Cambridge, UK: Cambridge University Press. ISBN 978-0-521-68976-2.
- Rodriguez, Robert (2012). Revolver: How the Beatles Reimagined Rock 'n' Roll. Milwaukee, WI: Backbeat Books. ISBN 978-1-61713-009-0.
- Schaffner, Nicholas (1978). The Beatles Forever. New York, NY: McGraw-Hill. ISBN 0-07-055087-5.
- Shankar, Ravi (1999). Raga Mala: The Autobiography of Ravi Shankar. New York, NY: Welcome Rain. ISBN 1-56649-104-5.
- Shankar, Ravi (2007) [1968]. My Music, My Life (updated edn). San Rafael, CA: Mandala Publishing. ISBN 978-1-60109-005-8.
- Tillery, Gary (2011). Working Class Mystic: A Spiritual Biography of George Harrison. Wheaton, IL: Quest Books. ISBN 978-0-8356-0900-5.
- Turner, Steve (2016). Beatles '66: The Revolutionary Year. New York, NY: HarperLuxe. ISBN 978-0-06-249713-0.
- Womack, Kenneth (2014). The Beatles Encyclopedia: Everything Fab Four. Santa Barbara, CA: ABC-CLIO. ISBN 978-0-313-39171-2.
