= Juan Mascaró =

Spanish translator

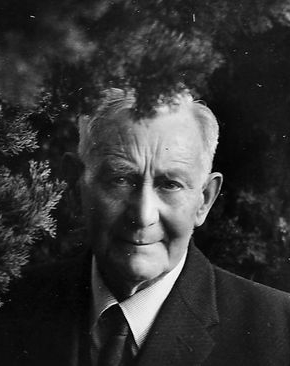
- Born: 8 December 1897; Santa Margarita, Mallorca, Spain
- Died: 19 March 1987 (aged 89); Comberton, Cambridge, UK
- Occupation: Translator
- Known for: Translations of classic books from Sanskrit to English, Spanish and Catalan
- Spouse: Kathleen Ellis (1951)
- Children: 2

Joan Mascaró (Catalan pronunciation: [ʒuˈam məskəˈɾo]), generally known as Juan (Spanish for Joan) (8 December 1897 – 19 March 1987) was a Spanish translator. He used the Spanish spelling of his name (Juan) because the Catalan spelling (Joan) is the same as that of the female English name "Joan".

== Biography ==
He was born in Santa Margalida, Mallorca to a farming family and took interest in spirituality at the early age of 13. Mascaró is responsible for one of the most popular English translations of the Hindu text Bhagavad Gita (1962), and of some of the major Upanishads (1965). He also translated, from Pāli into English, a key Buddhist text, Dhammapada (1973). His first work, Lamps of Fire (1958), was a collection of religious and spiritual wisdom from across the world; a selection from the book inspired the Beatles song "The Inner Light" (1968). Though his native tongue was Catalan, he translated into English. Mascaró's obituary in The New York Times said he had, "achieved the unique feat of translation from languages not his own (Sanskrit and Pali) into another language not at first his own (English)."

His interest in religion started from the age of 13 when he studied a book on occultism. After finding this spiritually misleading, he discovered an older English translation of the Bhagavad Gita. This inspired him to study Sanskrit in order to gain a better understanding of the text, as the available translation was quite poor.

Mascaró studied modern and oriental languages at Cambridge University and spent some time lecturing on the Spanish Mystics. He then went to Ceylon where he was Vice-Principal of Parameshwara College at Jaffna. Later, he became Professor of English at the Autonomous University of Barcelona. He settled in England after the Spanish Civil War and there made his translations of the Bhagavad Gita and Upanishads, as well as returning to Cambridge University, where he was a supervisor of English and lectured on "Literary and Spiritual Values in the Authorized Version of the Bible." He was made doctor honoris causa by the University of the Balearic Islands.

He married Kathleen Ellis in 1951 and had a twin son and daughter. He died in 1987 at his home in Comberton, Cambridge.

== Bibliography ==
- Lamps of Fire/Lámparas de fuego (1958) ISBN 9788449325601.
- The Bhagavad Gita (1962) ISBN 9780140449181.
- The Upanishads (1965) ISBN 0-14-044163-8.
- Dhammapada (1973) ISBN 9780141915920
- The Creation of Faith (1993) ISBN 9781896209296.
- Himalayas of the Soul (1938) ISBN 9333468641.
- A Star from the East, An Appreciation of Bhagavad Gita (1954).
- El ser y el amor (Ensayos sobre el Apocalipsis) (1973).
- Cartes d'un mestre a un amic (1993) ISBN 8487685358.
