= Ravi Shankar discography =

Ravi Shankar had numerous solo recordings published, including these:

== Studio and live albums ==
- Three Ragas (1956)
- The Sounds of India (1957)
- India's Master Musician (1959)
- Ragas & Talas (1959)
- Music of India (1962)
- Improvisations (1962)
- In Concert (1962)
- Ravi Shankar (Odeon Records, India catalogue) (1963)
- In London (1964)
- The Master Musicians of India (with Ali Akbar Khan) (1964)
- Portrait of Genius (1964)
- Ravi Shankar and Ali Akbar Khan (1965)
- Sound of the Sitar (1965)
- West Meets East with Yehudi Menuhin (also titled Menuhin Meets Shankar) (1967)
- In San Francisco (1967)
- The Exotic Sitar and Sarod (1967)
- Two Raga Moods (1967)
- Live: Ravi Shankar at the Monterey International Pop Festival (1967)
- A Morning Raga / An Evening Raga (1968)
- In New York (1968)
- West Meets East, Volume 2 with Yehudi Menuhin (1968)
- Music from India serie no.8 (1968)
- A Sitar Recital (1968)
- Ravi Shankar Improvisations & theme from Pather Panchali (1968)
- Ravi Shankar's Festival from India (1968)
- Chappaqua (1968)
- Ravi Shankar (1969)
- At the Woodstock Festival (1969)
- Music of India A Dhun and a Raga with Ali Akbar Khan (1969)
- Ravi Shankar Raga Parameshwari (1970)
- Six Ragas (1970)
- The Exciting Music of Ravi Shankar (1970)
- Four Raga Moods (1971)
- PBP Ravi Shankar and PBU Ahmedjan Thirakhwa (1971)
- Joi Bangla EP (1971)
- Concerto for Sitar & Orchestra with the London Symphony Orchestra and André Previn (1971)
- The Concert for Bangladesh (1971) – side one only, with Ali Akbar Khan
- The Genius of Ravi Shankar (1972)
- Ravi Shankar (1972)
- Ravi Shankar Ragas (1972)
- The Masters of Indian Music (1972) (double album with Ali Albar Khan)
- In Concert 1972 with Ali Akbar Khan (1973)
- Ragas with Ali Akbar Khan – contains The Master Musicians of India (1964) and the Ali Akbar Khan album The Soul of Indian Music (1965) (released as a double album in 1973)
- Shankar Family & Friends (1974) – available as part of Shankar and George Harrison box set Collaborations (2010)
- Ravi Shankar's Music Festival from India (1976) – available as part of Collaborations box set (2010)
- Improvisations – West Meets East 3 – with Yehudi Menuhin and Jean-Pierre Rampal (1976)
- Ravi Shankar (1979)
- Shankar in Japan (1979)
- Jazzmine (1980) – with George Adams and others
- The Spirit of India (Deutsche Grammophon, 1980)
- Homage to Mahatma Gandhi (1981)
- Raga-Mala (Sitar Concerto No. 2) (1982)
- Raga Mishra Piloo: duet for sitar & sarod (1983) – with Ali Akbar Khan
- Pandit Ravi Shankar (1986)
- Tana Mana (1987)
- Ravi Shankar: the Doyen of Hindustani Music (1988)
- Inside the Kremlin (1988)
- Passages with Philip Glass (1990) (Atlantic Records)
- Concert for Peace: Royal Albert Hall (1995)
- Genesis (1995)
- Towards the Rising Sun (1996)
- Ravi Shankar: In Celebration (1996)
- Chants of India (1997) – available as part of Collaborations box set (2010)
- Raga Tala (1997)
- Shankar: Sitar Concertos and Other Works (1998)
- Shankar: Raga Jogeshwari (1998)
- Vision of Peace: The Art of Ravi Shankar (2000)
- Full Circle: Carnegie Hall 2000 (2001)
- Between Two Worlds (documentary directed by Mark Kidel) (2001)
- Flowers of India (2007)
- More Flowers of India (2008)
- Collaborations box set, with George Harrison (2010)
- Symphony with London Philharmonic Orchestra and David Murphy (2012)
- The Living Room Sessions Part 1 (2012)
- The Living Room Sessions Part 2 (2013)
- A Night at St. John the Divine (2014)
- Live In Bangalore (2015) 2CD/DVD (with Anoushka Shankar; music and audio/visual performance recorded live on February 7, 2012 at the Bengaluru Palace Grounds in Bangalore, India, as part of the Premanjali Festival)
- In Hollywood, 1971 (2016)
- Ghanashyam: A Broken Branch (2017)
- Live in Copenhagen (2020)

== Film music ==
Year	Title	Director	Note
1946	Neecha Nagar	Chetan Anand	
1955–1959	The Apu Trilogy	Satyajit Ray	
1957	A Chairy Tale	Norman McLaren	
1958	Parash Pathar	Satyajit Ray	
1960	Anuradha	Hrishikesh Mukherjee	
1961	Sandhyarag	Jiban Gangopadhyay	
1963	Godaan	Trilok Jetley	
1966	Alice in Wonderland	Jonathan Miller	composer of original score
1966	Chappaqua	Conrad Rooks	
1968	Monterey Pop	D.A. Pennebaker	
1968	Charly	Ralph Nelson	
1971	Raga	Howard Worth	
1972	The Concert for Bangladesh	Saul Swimmer	Organized by George Harrison with Ravi Shankar
1973	Viola		Produced by R. Davis, British art film; soundtrack album: Transmigration Macabre; Spark Records SRLM 2002
1974	Forbidden Image	Jeremy Marre	
1979	Meera	Gulzar	
1982	Gandhi	Richard Attenborough	Academy Award nomination for Shankar and George Fenton
1986	Genesis		
2003	Concert for George	David Leland	
