= Living Room (disambiguation) =

A living room is a room in a residential house or apartment for relaxing and socializing.

Living Room may also refer to:

== Arts and entertainment ==
=== Music ===
- The Living Room EP, a 2003 EP by Seldon Plan
- Living Room (AJR album), 2015
- Living Room, a 2010 album by Ali Baba's Tahini
- Living Room, a 1984 album by Mark Murphy

=== Theatre ===
- The Living Room (play), a 1953 play by Graham Greene
- Living Room (1943 play), a 1943 work by Esther McCracken
- Living Room (2015 play), an Indian play written and directed by Kalki Koechlin

=== Other uses ===
- The Living Room (TV series), an Australian lifestyle program
- Living Room (sculpture), an outdoor 2001 sculpture by Tamsie Ringler
- Living Room Games, an American company that produced role-playing games

== Other uses ==
- The Living Room, a former New York music venue

== See also ==
- The Living Room Sessions (disambiguation), title of a number of albums
- Living Room Music, a 1940 composition by John Cage
- Living Room Suite, a 1978 album by Harry Chapin
- The Complete Living Room Tapes, a 2003 album by Lenny Breau and Brad Terry
- Live in the Living Room, a 2008 album by John Craigie
- The Living Room Tour, a 2005 album by Carole King
  - "Welcome to My Living Room", a ballad written and sung by Carole King
- "Living Room Song", a bonus track on the 2011 album Suburbia I've Given You All and Now I'm Nothing by The Wonder Years
- Family room, an informal, all-purpose room in a house
