= India's Most Distinguished Musician in Concert =

India's Most Distinguished Musician In Concert

Live album by Ravi Shankar
- Released: 1962 (LP); April 6, 1999 (CD)
- Recorded: November 19, 1961
- Genre: Hindustani classical music
- Length: 42:01
- Label: World Pacific (LP) Angel (CD)

Ravi Shankar chronology
Improvisations (1962)	India's Most Distinguished Musician In Concert (1962)	India's Master Musician (1963)

Professional ratings
Review scores
Source	Rating
Allmusic	link

India's Most Distinguished Musician In Concert is a 1962 live album released by Ravi Shankar. It was recorded 19 November 1961 during one of Shankar's early seminal American performances, at UCLA. It was later digitally remastered and released in CD format through Angel Records. The digital remastering was by Squires Productions.

Supporting musicians are Kanai Dutt on tabla and Nodu Mullick on Tamboura.

== Track listing ==
1. "Madhuvanti" – 23:53
2. "Dhun in Mishra Mand" – 18:08
