= Shambhu Das =

Indian classical musician and educator (born 1934)

- Born: 1934 (age 91–92); Benares, India
- Genres: Hindustani classical, Indo jazz
- Occupations: Musician, teacher
- Instrument: Sitar
- Website: shambhudas.com

Shambhu Das (born 1934) is an Indian classical musician and educator. He is best known for his long association with Ravi Shankar, on whose behalf Das has acted as an ambassador for Indian music in Canada since the early 1970s, and his friendship with George Harrison of the Beatles, whom Das helped teach sitar in 1966. His assistance in Harrison's immersion in Indian culture helped inspire the Beatles' career direction and, due to the band's popularity and influence, the direction of the 1960s counterculture. In 1970, Das established the Indian Music Department at Toronto's York University, where he taught for four years.

Das recruited the Indian musicians and played sitar on Harrison's 1968 solo album Wonderwall Music, which was partly recorded in Bombay. He occasionally accompanied Shankar at his concerts and has performed himself throughout North America, Europe and India. From the 1990s, Das's work has increasingly drawn on the connection between music and meditation as a means of physical and spiritual healing. In the early 2000s, he formed the Indo jazz ensemble Shanti. A 24-hour sitar recital he gave in Toronto in October 2004, undertaken as a benefit for those affected by floods in India and Bangladesh, is recognised by Guinness World Records as the longest non-stop sitar performance.

== Early years and musical apprenticeship ==
Das was born in the Hindu holy city of Benares, in the north Indian state of Uttar Pradesh. He was brought up in the Bengali Hindu tradition. His father was a restaurateur who supplied food to the Allied forces during World War II. Das says his first memory of hearing an Indian classical raga was a performance by a shehnaist outside a temple.

Das was first taught sitar by a music tutor who visited his home. He then attended Theosophical college, where his studies continued under the Dagar brothers. He also studied tabla and vocal technique. During a concert held at the college, Das met Ravi Shankar, whom Das asked to accept him as a sitar student. He attended Benares Hindu University, graduating with a master's degree in music in 1959. That year, Das joined Shankar in Bombay, where he became part of Shankar's household, occasionally accompanied his guru in concert, and also served as his personal assistant. He studied sitar under Shankar in the strict guru–shishya tradition in which Shankar had trained under Allauddin Khan.

== Kinnara School of Music ==
By the early 1960s, Das was one of Shankar's most advanced students, or protégés, along with Shamim Ahmed Khan, Kartick Kumar and Amiyo Das Gupta. He was among the musicians selected to teach instrumental classes when Shankar founded his Kinnara School of Music in Bombay, which opened in July 1962. The school staged recitals and productions of Shankar's orchestral works, such as Nava Rasa Ranga in 1964, performed by the teachers and students.

In September 1966, Das assisted in teaching sitar to George Harrison of the Beatles. After fans and the press learnt of Harrison's presence in Bombay, prompting scenes of Beatlemania outside his hotel, Das accompanied Shankar and Harrison to Dal Lake in Kashmir, where Harrison's training continued. He and Das struck up a friendship as the majority of Harrison's musical education involved learning Indian scales, a task that Shankar delegated to Das. During this visit by Harrison, Das escorted him to Benares and other sites of cultural significance. (Note: According to the history supplied with the India-related memorabilia on display at the 2009 For George exhibition in Liverpool, Harrison's hometown in Britain, Harrison was so grateful to Das that he gave him his sitar.) There, Harrison saw first-hand the aspects of Hindu culture and religiosity that would inform his work with the Beatles, including their 1967 album Sgt. Pepper's Lonely Hearts Club Band, and influence the direction of the 1960s counterculture in the West.

When Shankar moved to Los Angeles in 1967 and set up a branch of the Kinnara school there, Das took over the running of the Bombay school. In January 1968, he played sitar on Harrison's Wonderwall Music album, which was recorded at the His Master's Voice studios in Bombay. Das recruited the other local musicians for the sessions, which also produced the Beatles' 1968 B-side "The Inner Light". He appeared in the film Raga, a documentary on Shankar that includes scenes filmed over 1967–68 at the two Kinnara centres. In an interview in 2005, Das told The New Indian Express that he recalled visiting Chennai (formerly Madras) in 1968 to film the scenes there for Raga.

Writing in 2013 in the journal Popular Music History, ethnomusicologist Jeffrey Cupchik said that Das's contribution to Harrison's musical and spiritual development, and its considerable influence on Western culture, had arguably been overlooked, as historians tend to focus only on the enduring association between Harrison and Shankar. He described Das and Harrison's friendship as "a relationship that has yet to be addressed fully by popular music historians".

== Toronto ==
In 1970, Shankar organised for Das to move to Canada to help promote Indian classical music in North America, through a program of lectures, public performances and private tuition. Between 1970 and 1974, Das taught at York University in Toronto, where he co-founded the Indian Music Department. (Note: York University went on to adopt a full study program in "world music". The university's professor emeritus R. Sterling Beckwith, who initiated the program from his arrival there in 1969, recalled discussing with Shankar the idea of introducing applied Indian music studies: "He was intrigued and recommended his sitar disciple Shambhu Das, who as it turned out, was already living in Toronto.") He then taught sitar and vocal technique at Sangeet, a private music school.

Continuing his association with his guru, Das helped organise Shankar's concerts in Canada. He also acted as Shankar's business manager, negotiating fees for private recitals for celebrities such as Peter Sellers. In August 1976, Das played tambura at Shankar's dusk-to-dawn recital at the Cathedral of St. John the Divine in New York City, a concert celebrating the twentieth anniversary of his first public appearance in the US. (Note: The concert was released on a live album, titled Nine Decades Vol. IV: A Night at St. John the Divine, by the Ravi Shankar Foundation's East Meets West Music label in 2014.) Das himself performed concerts in India, North America and Europe, and made appearances on CBC television and radio.

In 1994, Das made two cassette recordings, titled Dhyanam and Shanti Vani, of musical pieces designed to accompany yoga and meditation practice. The two collections were endorsed by Sri Chinmoy of the United Nations Meditation Centre in New York, and became popular among practitioners throughout Canada and the United States. In 1996, Das published the book Music and Meditation, written with Samprasad Majumdar. The book sought to further understanding of the connection between Indian classical music and meditation incorporating Vedic mantras. It introduced a musical–spiritual concept termed DH3M (deep hypnosis music-meditation method), which Das espoused as a cure for psychological and physical pain. In the book, he describes DH3M as a "combination of Western science and Eastern wisdom, of ancient philosophy and collaboration of celestial music".

In the early 2000s, Das formed the band Shanti, an Indo jazz ensemble. The name was taken from the Sanskrit word for peace, since the band's music was intended to "raise one's sense of inner divine peace". In 2003, the ten-piece ensemble comprised three sitars, tambura, two tablas, electric keyboard, soprano saxophone, electric guitar, bass guitar and vocals. Das credited Harrison and the Wonderwall Music project with inspiring his move towards Indo jazz. (Note: In Cupchik's view, working with Harrison on Wonderwall Music in 1968 also inspired Das's subsequent forays into "bridging the spiritual–musical aspects of Indian and Western music in a more explicitly eschatological vein".)

In 2004, Das responded to an initiative launched by the Ontario premier, Dalton McGuinty, to contribute humanitarian aid to citizens of India, Bangladesh and Nepal after the region had been subject to devastating floods. On 8–9 October, Das performed a 24-hour sitar marathon at the University of Toronto's William Doo Auditorium to raise awareness and funds for those affected in India and Bangladesh. Das overcame poor health to complete the day-long performance; as stipulated beforehand, he left the stage only for toilet breaks, during which his place was taken by one of his students. The performance was recognised by Guinness World Records as the longest sitar recital. In September 2005, the Federation of Bangladeshi Associations in North America (FOBANA) presented him with an award for "his outstanding contribution in promoting Bengali culture to the new generation".

After debuting the work in Chicago in 2007, Das presented In Search of Peace – Music and Meditation, a combination of performance and lecture, in Chennai in February 2008. A solo presentation, it included an alap (based on raga Komal Rishabh Asavari) that incorporated aspects of Hindustani classical, fusion, and Indo jazz, accompanied by a video projection of scenes from Benares and the Ganges.

The Toronto Star has described Das as "one of India's most distinguished musicians". When asked in a 2010 interview for Canada's National Post why he had never attempted to become a commercial recording artist, Das replied: "I love to perform, but I am not sure that what I have to offer is as good as or better than my guru ... If my guru's work is a work of gold, perhaps I can compare my style to silver, with a few glints of gold that I have received from my teacher."

== Personal life ==
Since the late 1970s, Das has lived with him family in Scarborough in the east of Toronto. In 1992, his only son died in an automobile accident. As a result of this loss, Das returned to India and lived in monasteries there, a period of reflection and re-energising that led to his meditation-based recordings and book later in the 1990s.

Several years after his return to Toronto, Das suffered a major heart attack. He was persuaded to re-engage with his passion for music by Shankar, whose son Shubho had also died in 1992, and who himself has begun to suffer serious heart problems at this time.

According to Cupchik, who interviewed Das at his Toronto home in 2003, Das was intending to write an autobiography at that time. With reference to Das's stated wish that he be more widely recognised for his contribution to Harrison's introduction to Indian culture, Cupchick said that, rather than opportunism on Das's part, such an account would be more "a way of affirming his own identity". (Note: Cupchik added that, had Das been searching for greater recognition in "Beatles historiography" in 2003, his standing had since risen through the 2004 Guinness World Book feat and his international concert schedule.)
