= Angadi (surname) =

Angadi is an Indian surname, from Kannada (ಅಂಗಡಿ) angaḍi meaning 'store' or 'shop'. Notable people with the surname include:

- Ashwini Angadi, global ambassador and advocate of disability rights
- Darien Angadi (1949–1981), British singer and actor, son of Patricia
- Patricia Angadi (1914–2001), British portrait painter and novelist
- Suresh Angadi (1955–2020), Indian politician
