= In New York =

In New York may refer to:

- In New York (Ravi Shankar album), 1968 American release
- In New York (Steve Grossman album), 1991 American release also with McCoy Tyner Trio

== See also ==
- The Cannonball Adderley Sextet in New York, a live album of 1962
