= Asian Music Circle =

English organisation that promoted Indian cultures

The Asian Music Circle (sometimes abbreviated to AMC) was an organisation founded in London, England, in 1946, that promoted Indian and other Asian styles of music, dance and culture in the West. The AMC is credited with having facilitated the assimilation of the Indian subcontinent's artistic traditions into mainstream British culture. Founded by Indian writer and former political activist Ayana Angadi and his English wife, Patricia Fell-Clarke, a painter and later a novelist, the organisation was run from their family home in the north London suburb of Finchley. The Asian Music Circle was the subject of a BBC Radio 4 programme Mr and Mrs Angadi broadcast on 13 January 2026.

In the 1950s, with Yehudi Menuhin as its president, the AMC organised the first Western performances by Indian classical musicians Ravi Shankar and Ali Akbar Khan, as well as Vilayat Khan's debut concerts in Britain. During the following decade, the Angadis introduced George Harrison of the Beatles to Shankar, initiating an association that saw Indian music reach its peak in international popularity over 1966–68. The Music Circle had its own London-based musicians, some of whom played on Harrison's Indian-style compositions for the Beatles, including "Within You Without You" from the album Sgt. Pepper's Lonely Hearts Club Band.

The AMC is recognised as having introduced yoga into Britain, through the Angadis' hosting of classes by visiting guru B.K.S. Iyengar. The organisation had ceased operation by 1970, when Ayana and Patricia Angadi separated.

== Background and early years ==
=== Ayana and Patricia Angadi ===
Asian Music Circle co-founder Ayana Deva Angadi came to London from Bombay, India, in 1924, to gain the qualifications necessary for a top position in the Indian Civil Service, under what was then British imperial rule. Instead, he embraced Trotskyist political philosophy and became an outspoken critic of British imperialism. During the 1930s and 1940s, Angadi wrote journal articles (often as Raj Hansa) and gave public and school lectures throughout the UK; having joined the Labour Party, he discovered that his views were too extreme for the party's more moderate sensibilities. Angadi's 1942 treatise Japan's Kampf impressed Britain's wartime Ministry of Information, but following the war, the authorities suspected him of being an agent for Soviet Russia's Cominform bureau.

Late in 1939, Angadi met Patricia Fell-Clarke at a social event held at London's Dorchester Hotel. The daughter of a wealthy English industrialist, Patricia had similarly rejected societal norms, finding her identity as a portrait painter. Despite strong objections from her family and peers, the couple were married on May 1 1943. Patricia would draw inspiration from this disapproval during her later career as a successful novelist, beginning with 1985's The Governess.

=== Founding ===
The Angadis lived on the top floor of the Fell-Clarke family residence, in the north London suburb of Hampstead, before Patricia's inheritance allowed them to purchase their own home, a large house at 116 Fitzalan Road, Finchley. She and her husband founded the Asian Music Circle (AMC) in 1946, with the aim of promoting Asian arts and culture in Britain. With the Fitzalan Road property as their headquarters, the couple went on to organise music recitals, dance performances and cultural lectures throughout the West.

Visiting performers often stayed with the family, which had grown to include four children by 1949. The third of these was Darien Angadi, later a choral soloist and an actor in Shakespearean productions by Trevor Nunn, Jonathan Miller and Herbert Wise. In his book Azaadi!: Stories and Histories of the Indian Subcontinent After Independence, author and journalist Reginald Massey writes that all the Angadi children were "brilliant and beautiful", with the youngest, Chandrika (or Clare), becoming the first Asian model to appear in Vogue magazine.

== 1950s ==
=== Yehudi Menuhin ===
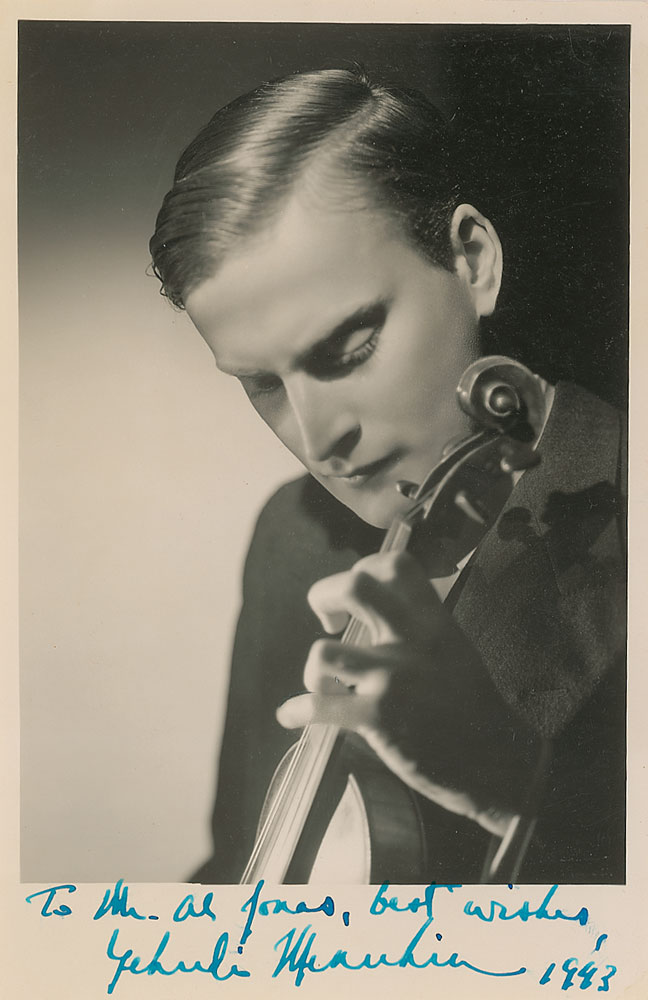
AMC president Yehudi Menuhin (pictured in 1943)

The Asian Music Circle's activities increased during the 1950s, such that some sources give 1953 or the mid-decade period as the date of its founding. Patricia was appointed chairperson of the Hampstead Artists Council in 1953, and among her portrait subjects were Labour MP Fenner Brockway and the American classical violinist Yehudi Menuhin. Another notable connection was Benjamin Britten, the English classical composer, who served as the AMC's vice-president. That same year, the AMC announced that its mission was to "[foster] the appreciation and study of the Music and Dances of all Asian countries, thereby creating greater understanding of Asian peoples and cultures".

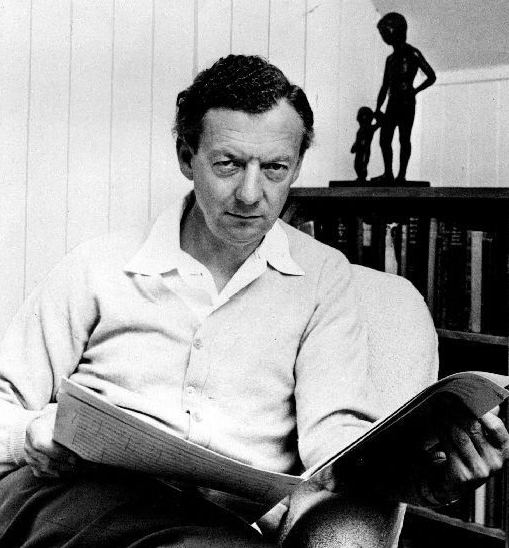
English composer Benjamin Britten in 1968

Also in 1953, Menuhin became the Music Circle's president, having made a visit to India, early the previous year, that had inspired him to enlighten Western listeners to the country's musical and cultural heritage. In his 2006 book The Dawn of Indian Music in the West, author Peter Lavezzoli writes of the violinist's role in the AMC: "Menuhin was the ideal candidate for its leadership. In light of his relentless work schedule, he set about achieving his aim with remarkable speed." Britten also made a tour of India, in 1956, and began incorporating Indian and other Asian influences in his composing. In June 1958, the AMC presented an Indian music and dance program as a part of the Aldeburgh Festival, an annual event co-founded by Britten in the late 1940s.

Following Menuhin's second Indian tour, in 1954, he invited yoga teacher B.K.S. Iyengar to Europe. According to Massey, the popularity of yoga in the UK originates from the day that the Angadis hosted a demonstration by Iyengar at their north London home, attended by some of their friends. Massey also credits the Asian Music Circle, and specifically Ayana Angadi, with "making the arts of the subcontinent a part of British cultural life". The Open University's Making Britain project has similarly written of the AMC's achievements: "This organization introduced Indian music, dance and yoga to the British public, paving the way for musicians such as Ravi Shankar and Ali Akbar Khan."

=== First Western performances by Ali Akbar Khan and Ravi Shankar ===
In 1955, through his role as AMC president, Menuhin gained funding from the Ford Foundation and John D. Rockefeller's Asia Society to stage the Living Arts of India Festival, in New York. His original choice for the festival's featured musical performer was Ravi Shankar, after Menuhin had attended a private concert by the sitar virtuoso while in Delhi, in February 1952. Shankar was forced to turn down the opportunity, in an effort to save his failing marriage to Annapurna Devi, and instead recommended his brother-in-law, master sarod player Ali Akbar Khan.

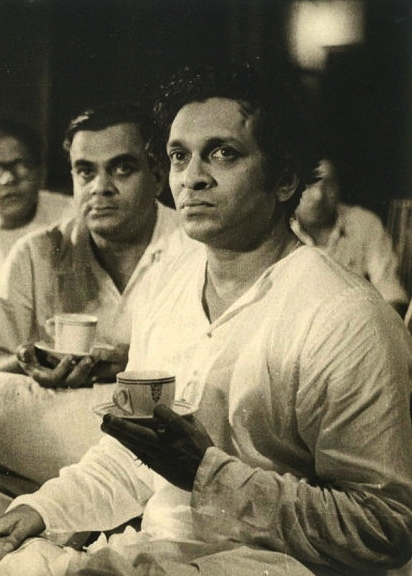
Ravi Shankar, pictured in Bombay during the recording of his score for the 1955 film Pather Panchali

The Living Arts festival, held in April 1955, marked both the first formal recital of Indian classical music in America, when Khan played at the Museum of Modern Art (MoMA), and the first appearance on US television by Indian classical artists, after Khan and his accompanists, as well as Bharat Natyam dancer Shanta Rao, performed on the arts and sciences show Omnibus. While in New York, Khan recorded Music of India: Morning and Evening Ragas (1955), the debut album release for Indian classical music. In addition to concerts at the MoMA – Khan's first outside India – Menuhin and the Asian Music Circle arranged other recitals for what amounted to a short US tour.

Menuhin subsequently organised for Khan to play in London later that year, at St Pancras Town Hall. The AMC then brought Ravi Shankar to Britain, where the sitarist made his Western concert debut in October 1956 with a performance at London's Friends House. After Shankar's 1956 visit, arrangements for his annual UK concert tours were shared between the Music Circle and promoter John Coast. The AMC also brought sitarist Vilayat Khan to the UK for the first time, a musician considered to be the era's leading exponent of sitar, together with Shankar.

=== AMC's local music network ===
The Music Circle maintained a list of London-based Indian musicians, who were available to visiting Indian artists, as backing players. In addition, these musicians performed locally themselves, as a group, and the Angadis offered their services for film and recording work. One such musician was Keshav Sathe, a tabla player from Bombay who was with the AMC over 1957–59 before going on to accompany sitarist Bhaskar Chandavarkar, a student of Shankar's.

== 1960s ==
=== Iyengar Yoga, South Asian dance, and the growth in Indian cultural influence ===
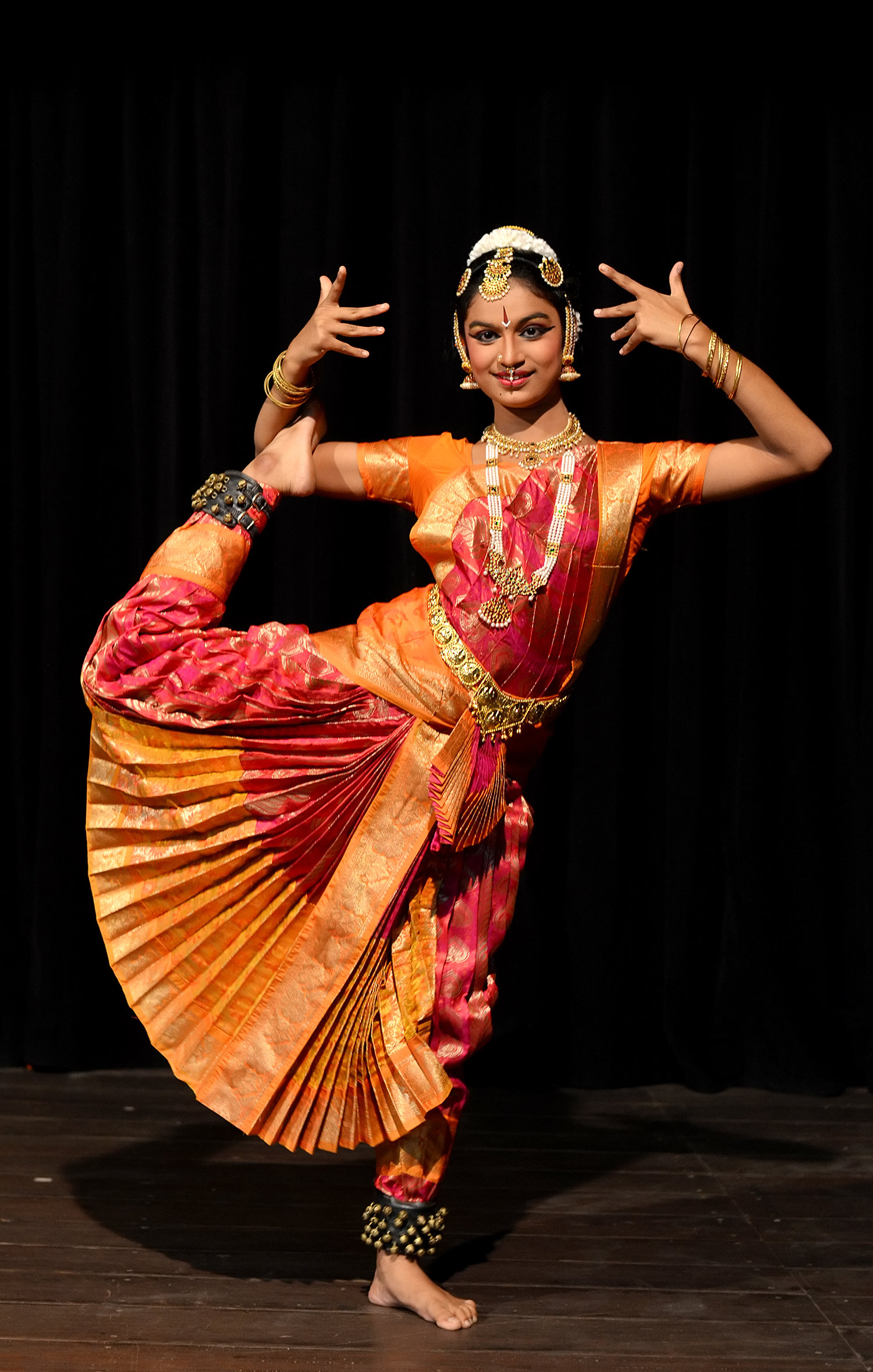
Bharat Natyam, a traditional dance form, was one of several aspects of Asian culture that the Music Circle helped to assimilate into Britain.

On one of B.K.S. Iyengar's visits to London in the early 1960s, he began holding instruction classes at the Fitzalan Road house, with future author and yoga practitioner Silva Mehta in attendance. The date for when these evening classes continued in Iyengar's absence, 18 July 1961, has been cited as the birth of Iyengar Yoga.

Among activities by the Angadis' pool of local musicians, George Martin, a staff producer with EMI-owned Parlophone Records, employed members of the AMC on a recording by comedian Peter Sellers in the early 1960s. EMI continued to use Ayana Angadi as a consultant of sorts on matters relating to Indian music.

In 1962, Martin began working with a new Parlophone signing, the Beatles, whose second feature film, Help! (1965), reflected the West's increased interest in Indian culture. While discussing the extent of this influence by the middle of that decade, author Ray Newman quotes from the book The New London Spy by Hunter Davies, who wrote: "Indian restaurants, Indian food, Indian shops, Indian cinemas, Indian concerts, Indian plays, yoga, gurus and contemplation are now all so much part of the London scene that when a grey Bentley drew into a Swiss Cottage petrol station recently and a 6 ft. 6 in. Sikh stepped out wearing a purple turban, green raw silk coat, white jodhpurs, gold slippers and an oriental dagger with a gem-studded hilt, the Irish attendant did not bother to take more than a passing glance."

South Asian dance also achieved lasting popularity and influence in the UK for the first time. British audiences had been introduced to the discipline by Uday Shankar's troupe during the 1920s, but South Asian dancers had struggled for recognition over the ensuing decades. According to cultural historian Naseem Khan, a "new story" began in 1966 when the Asian Music Circle presented the country's first formal Indian dances classes. The enduring success of these classes rested on the Angadis' decision to bring over, from South India, two instructors who had studied Bharat Natyam in the authentic guru–kula tradition. The instructors – a married couple named Krishna Rao and Chandrabhaga Devi – went on to form a dance company with their students and tour throughout Britain, Ireland and Belgium.

=== Association with the Beatles ===
George Harrison at a Beatles press conference in 1964

In October 1965, Martin was producing a session for the Beatles song "Norwegian Wood", which featured George Harrison playing sitar, an instrument that the guitarist had never before used on a recording. When Harrison broke a string during the session, Martin suggested that the band contact Angadi to get a replacement. Ringo Starr then telephoned the Fitzalan Road house and made the request. According to the Angadis' eldest son, Shankara, the whole family delivered the new string to EMI's Abbey Road Studios and watched the recording being made.

Keen to progress on the instrument, Harrison received tuition from one of the Music Circle's sitar players. Harrison then became a regular visitor to Fitzalan Road, attending recitals held there with his wife, Pattie Boyd. Harrison and Boyd also had their portrait painted by Patricia during this time. The proximity to the Angadis and their network furthered Harrison's interest in Indian music and culture, which he immediately absorbed into the Beatles' work.

When recording his first Indian-styled composition for the Beatles, "Love You To", in April 1966, Harrison used a tabla player, Anil Bhagwat, at the recommendation of Patricia Angadi. Other AMC musicians appeared on the recording, playing tambura and sitar. Bhagwat, who was funding his university education through his musical activities, received £35 for the session and later described it as "one of the most exciting times of my life". In the pop milieu, the song marked the first example of an artist capturing a non-Western musical form authentically, in its structure and arrangement, and of Asian music being adapted without parody. Bhagwat received a credit on the band's Revolver album sleeve, a rare acknowledgement for an outside musician on a Beatles release.

=== Shankar and George Harrison ===
While also crediting the AMC with introducing Shankar, Ali Akbar Khan and other leading Indian classical musicians to British audiences, Massey writes of Ayana Angadi having a "seminal" influence on Western culture, due to his role in introducing George Harrison to Ravi Shankar. The meeting occurred on 1 June 1966 when the Angadi family hosted a dinner to honour Shankar, who was in the UK for a series of performances that would include his historic duet with Menuhin at the Bath Musical Festival. Although not invited, Paul McCartney also attended the dinner, since he was eager to meet the sitarist. Shankar agreed to accept Harrison as his sitar student, so beginning an association that, music critic Ken Hunt writes, "brought Indian music real global attention".

Harrison's friendship with the sitarist – already the best-known Indian classical musician internationally – increased Shankar's standing to that of a rock star and initiated Indian music's peak in popularity in the West, during the second half of the 1960s. The meeting at Fitzalan Road is covered in Ajoy Bose's 2021 documentary The Beatles and India, in which Shankara Angadi describes McCartney as seeming out of his depth, but not Harrison, who Boyd says must have known Shankar "in a past life". In his review of the film for Uncut, Pete Paphides terms this initial meeting at the AMC a "momentous encounter", given the cultural impact of the Beatles' association with India.

The Asian Music Circle's cause also profited from Harrison's involvement and the heightened interest in Indian culture during this period. His visits to Fitzalan Road ended in late 1966, however. Speaking to Newman, Shankara recalled: "My father was a difficult character, in some ways. He was chaotic, and never really pulled anything off he set out to do. He probably asked George for money, and that was the end of that relationship."

=== Further Indian music recordings by Harrison ===
In March 1967, Harrison again consulted the Music Circle to find suitable musicians for one of his recordings. The song, "Within You Without You", features AMC members on instruments such as dilruba and tabla, and appeared on the Beatles' seminal album Sgt. Pepper's Lonely Hearts Club Band. Aside from the Western string orchestration arranged and overdubbed by Martin, and Beatles assistant Neil Aspinall playing one of the tambura parts, Harrison and the Indian players were the only musicians on the track. None of the Music Circle personnel were credited by name, a situation that Lavezzoli finds regrettable, given the quality of the tabla and dilruba playing. Research undertaken by the University of Liverpool's Department of Music has since identified the four musicians as Anna Joshi, Amrit Gajjar (both dilruba), Buddhadev Kansara (tambura) and Natwar Soni (tabla).

Talking to Hunter Davies, Harrison bemoaned how, although the AMC's musicians played "much better than any Western musicians could do", the fact that they had daytime jobs and only played music part-time was reflected in their abilities in some cases. Harrison's next recordings in the genre were for the soundtrack to Joe Massot's film Wonderwall, part of which was issued as his first solo album, Wonderwall Music (1968). Harrison started the sessions in November 1967, again at Abbey Road, with an unnamed tabla player among the line-up of contributors. Looking for greater authenticity, he then travelled to Bombay in January 1968 and recorded at His Master's Voice's studios with musicians including Shivkumar Sharma, Aashish Khan and Hariprasad Chaurasia.

== Disbandment ==
By 1970 the Asian Music Circle had ceased operating, as the Angadis separated. That year, Angadi returned to India, and Patricia moved to a house in Hampstead's Flask Walk.

In December 1992, George Harrison became the first recipient of the Billboard Century Award, partly through the former Beatle's "critical role in laying the groundwork for the modern concept of world music" with his Indian-influenced songs, and for his having "advanced society's comprehension of the spiritual and altruistic power of popular music". In an interview coinciding with the award, Harrison said the AMC's work had continued through the larger and more professionally organised Asian Music Circuit.

== Sources ==
- Humphrey Carpenter, Benjamin Britten: A Biography, Faber and Faber (London, 1992; ISBN 0-571-14324-5).
- Ian Carr, Digby Fairweather & Brian Priestley, The Rough Guide to Jazz, Rough Guides (London, 2004; ISBN 978-1-84353-256-9).
- Mervyn Cooke, Britten and the Far East: Asian Influences in the Music of Benjamin Britten, The Boydell Press (Woodbridge, UK, 1998; ISBN 0-85115-830-7).
- Hunter Davies (ed.), The New London Spy, Anthony Blond (London, 1966; ISBN 978-0-218-51438-4).
- Ian Inglis, The Words and Music of George Harrison, Praeger (Santa Barbara, CA, 2010; ISBN 978-0-313-37532-3).
- B.K.S. Iyengar with Kofi Busia, Iyengar: The Yoga Master, Shambhala Publications (Boston, MA, 2007; ISBN 978-1-59030-524-9).
- Ashley Kahn (ed.), George Harrison on George Harrison: Interviews and Encounters, Chicago Review Press (Chicago, IL, 2020; ISBN 978-1-64160-051-4).
- Naseem Khan, "South Asian Dance in Britain 1960–1995", in Alessandra Iyer (ed.), South Asian Dance: The British Experience, Taylor & Francis (Abingdon, UK, 1997; ISBN 978-9-057-02043-8), pp. 25–30.
- Peter Lavezzoli, The Dawn of Indian Music in the West, Continuum (New York, NY, 2006; ISBN 0-8264-2819-3).
- Ian MacDonald, Revolution in the Head: The Beatles' Records and the Sixties, Pimlico (London, 1998; ISBN 0-7126-6697-4).
- Reginald Massey, Azaadi!: Stories and Histories of the Indian Subcontinent After Independence, Abhinav Publications (New Delhi, NCT, 2005; ISBN 81-7017-469-4).
- Barry Miles, The Beatles Diary Volume 1: The Beatles Years, Omnibus Press (London, 2001; ISBN 0-7119-8308-9).
- Ray Newman, "Chapter 2: Hunting Tigers Out in Indiah", Abracadabra! The Complete Story of the Beatles' Revolver, Popkult Books (London, 2006), pp. 11–32.
- Robert Rodriguez, Revolver: How the Beatles Reimagined Rock 'n' Roll, Backbeat Books (Milwaukee, WI, 2012; ISBN 978-1-61713-009-0).
- Ravi Shankar, My Music, My Life, Mandala Publishing (San Rafael, CA, 2007 [1968]; ISBN 978-1-60109-005-8).
- Ravi Shankar, Raga Mala: The Autobiography of Ravi Shankar, Welcome Rain (New York, NY, 1999; ISBN 1-56649-104-5).
- Gary Tillery, Working Class Mystic: A Spiritual Biography of George Harrison, Quest Books (Wheaton, IL, 2011; ISBN 978-0-8356-0900-5).
- Steve Turner, Beatles '66: The Revolutionary Year, HarperLuxe (New York, NY, 2016; ISBN 978-0-06-249713-0).
- Rozina Visram, Asians in Britain: 400 Years of History, Pluto Press (London, 2002; ISBN 978-0-7453-1373-3).
- Kenneth Womack, The Beatles Encyclopedia: Everything Fab Four, ABC-CLIO (Santa Barbara, CA, 2014; ISBN 978-0-313-39171-2).
- World Music: The Rough Guide (Volume 2: Latin and North America, Caribbean, India, Asia and Pacific), Rough Guides/Penguin (London, 2000; ISBN 1-85828-636-0).
