= Ragas & Talas =

Studio album by Ravi Shankar
- Released: 1959 (Vinyl); February 29, 2000 (CD)
- Genre: Hindustani classical music
- Label: World Pacific (vinyl) Angel Records (CD)

Ravi Shankar chronology
India's Master Musician (1959)	Ragas & Talas (1959)	Portrait of Genius (1964)

Professional ratings
Review scores
Source	Rating
Allmusic	4.5/5 stars

Ragas & Talas is an album by Hindustani classical musician Ravi Shankar, first released in 1959 by His Master's Voice. It was later digitally remastered and released in CD format through Angel Records.

== Track listing ==
1. "Rupak Tal" – 5:12
2. "Raga Madhu-Kauns" – 21:03
3. "Raga Jogiya" – 16:00
4. "Dhun" – 10:32
