= The Living Room Sessions =

The Living Room Sessions may refer to:

- The Living Room Sessions (David Grisman, Frank Vignola, Robin Nolan and Michael Papillo album), 2007
- The Living Room Sessions (B. J. Thomas album), 2013
- The Living Room Sessions Part 1, a 2012 album by Ravi Shankar
- The Living Room Sessions Part 2, a 2013 album by Ravi Shankar
