= Ravi Shankar's Festival from India =

Studio album by Ravi Shankar
- Released: December 1968
- Recorded: mid 1968; World Pacific Studio, Los Angeles
- Genre: Indian classical
- Label: World Pacific
- Producer: Richard Bock

Ravi Shankar's Festival from India is a double album by Indian musician and composer Ravi Shankar, released on World Pacific Records in December 1968. It contains studio recordings made by a large ensemble of performers, many of whom Shankar had brought to the United States from India. Among the musicians were Shivkumar Sharma, Jitendra Abhisheki, Palghat Raghu, Lakshmi Shankar, Aashish Khan and Alla Rakha. The project presented Indian classical music in an orchestral setting, so recalling Shankar's work as musical director of All India Radio in the years before he achieved international fame as a soloist during the 1960s.

After recording the album in Los Angeles, Shankar's ensemble – also titled the Festival from India – toured America during June and July 1968. Some of the performers subsequently taught at Shankar's Kinnara School of Music, instructing Western students in the intricacies of Indian music. Shankar revisited the Festival from India concept in 1974, when George Harrison sponsored a program of European concerts titled Ravi Shankar's Music Festival from India.

== History ==
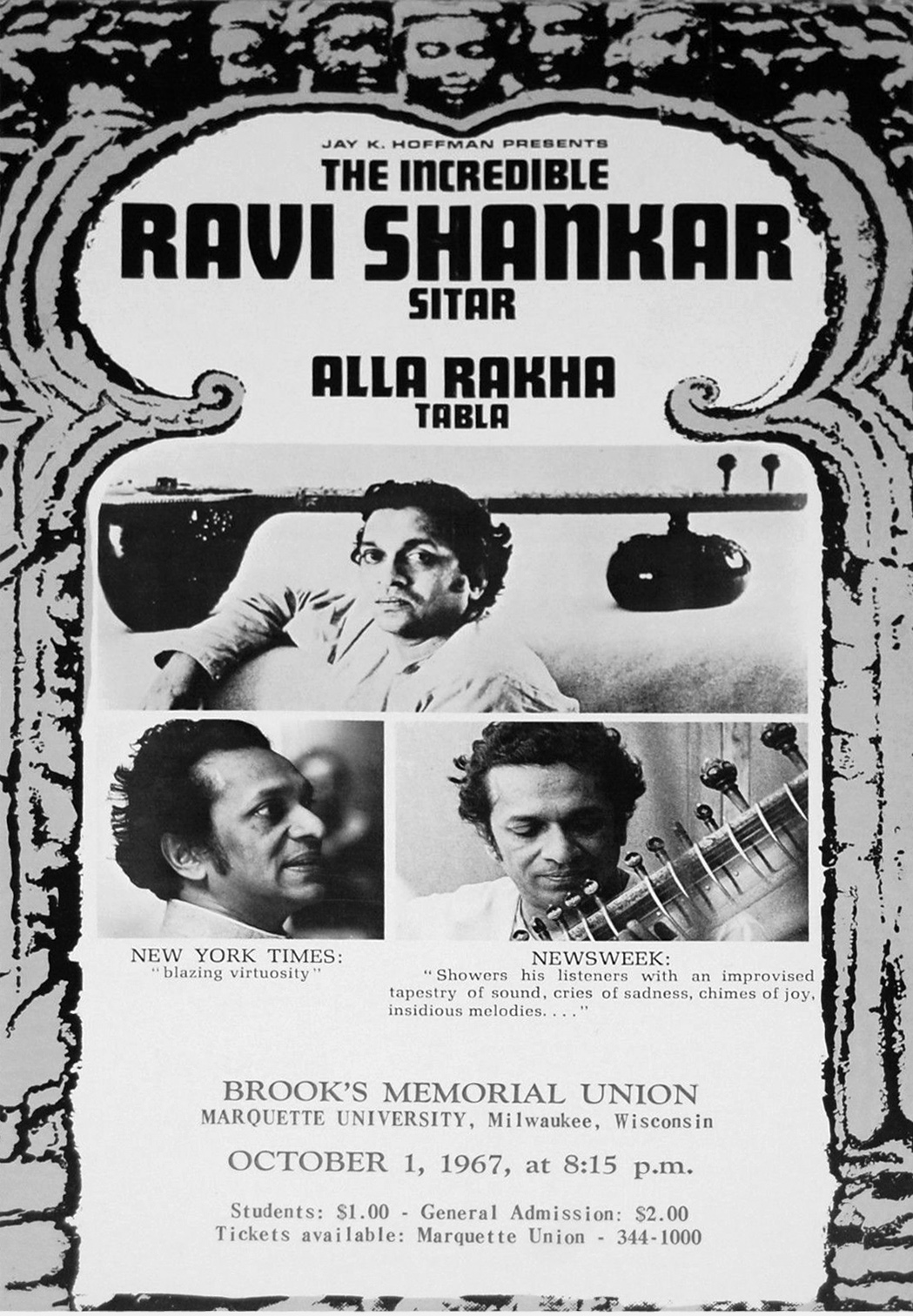
Flyer for an October 1967 concert by Shankar and Alla Rakha, held four months after their performance at the Monterey Pop Festival

Having achieved international fame over 1966–67, Ravi Shankar spent the early part of 1968 in India filming a documentary of his life, Raga, and writing his first autobiography, My Music, My Life. Both of these projects allowed him to reflect on his status as an ambassador for Indian culture and on the criticism that he received from purists and some fellow musicians in India, who accused him of betraying his roots and commercialising Indian classical music. In a 2007 interview, Shankar continued to refute such criticism, citing his adherence to the guru-shishya tradition, whereby he had nurtured the development of his protégés Harihar Rao, Amiyo Das Gupta, Kartick Kumar and Shamim Ahmed after moving to the United States. He also highlighted the 1968 Festival from India revue as one of many musical ventures where he had brought over other Indian classical performers that were little known in the West.

Before beginning his international career in 1956, Shankar had been musical director of All India Radio and head of the national orchestra, the Vadya Vrinda. Subsequently, in between his engagements in the West, he had continued to compose and perform orchestral productions, such as Nava Rasa Ranga in 1964. While in India making Raga, Shankar was filmed rehearsing with a large cast of musicians in a Bombay studio. For his Festival from India orchestra, Shankar then asked the following performers to join him in California: his sister-in-law Lakshmi Shankar (vocals), Shivkumar Sharma (santoor), Sharad Kumar (shehnai and flute), Sabri Khan (sarangi), Miskin Khan (tabla and percussion), Jitendra Abhisheki (vocals) and Palghat Raghu (mridangam). His students Das Gupta and Ahmed contributed on tambura and sitar, respectively, while Rao's brother Taranath, although a skilled tablist, played tambura.

In his second autobiography, Raga Mala, Shankar writes that for most of these players, the 1968 Festival from India was "their first big break in the West". (Note: Lakshmi had toured internationally earlier in the 1960s, however, as part of Uday Shankar's dance troupe. Sharma had also begun to establish himself in the West, through the popularity of his album Call of the Valley, a 1967 collaboration with bansuri player Hariprasad Chaurasia and lap slide guitarist Brij Bhushan Kabra.) According to Shankar's recollection, the other personnel were Aashish Khan (sarod) and Fakir Mohammad (dholak and tambura), together with musicians who had regularly accompanied Shankar during his raga recitals in the West: Alla Rakha (tabla), Nodu Mullick (tambura and swarmandel) and Kamala Chakravarty (vocals). The ensemble's instrumentation also included veena and kanjira. Some of the performers would subsequently teach at Shankar's Kinnara School of Music, the students of which included rock musicians Jim Morrison and Robbie Krieger of the Doors, Collin Walcott and Russ Titelman.

== Recording ==
With his orchestra assembled in Los Angeles, Shankar recorded a double album, titled Ravi Shankar's Festival from India. The sessions took place at World Pacific's studio and were produced by Richard Bock, the record label's founder. (Note: Shankar's piece "V 7½" was also recorded at a Bock-produced session in 1968, featuring jazz flautist Bud Shank and percussionist Emil Richards, along with Festival from India musicians Rakha, Sharma, Aashish Khan, Kumar, Sabri Khan, Miskin Khan, Raghu and Ahmed. The track remained unreleased until its inclusion on the 1996 four-disc compilation Ravi Shankar: In Celebration.) Shankar later admired the album as "a highly satisfactory recording" with "many varied items, ranging from classical to folk in style".

Following the opening "Vedic Hymn" (sung by Abhisheki), its content included Shankar's orchestral adaptations of ragas such as Kirwani, Malkauns and Vasanta; thumri and bhajan vocal pieces; and dhun and other traditional folk tunes. The range of instruments also allowed for a blending of the two disciplines of Indian classical music, with sitar, sarod and tabla being the mainstays of the Hindustani (or North Indian) system, while veena, mridangam and kanjira are commonly associated with the Carnatic (South Indian) system.

== US tour ==
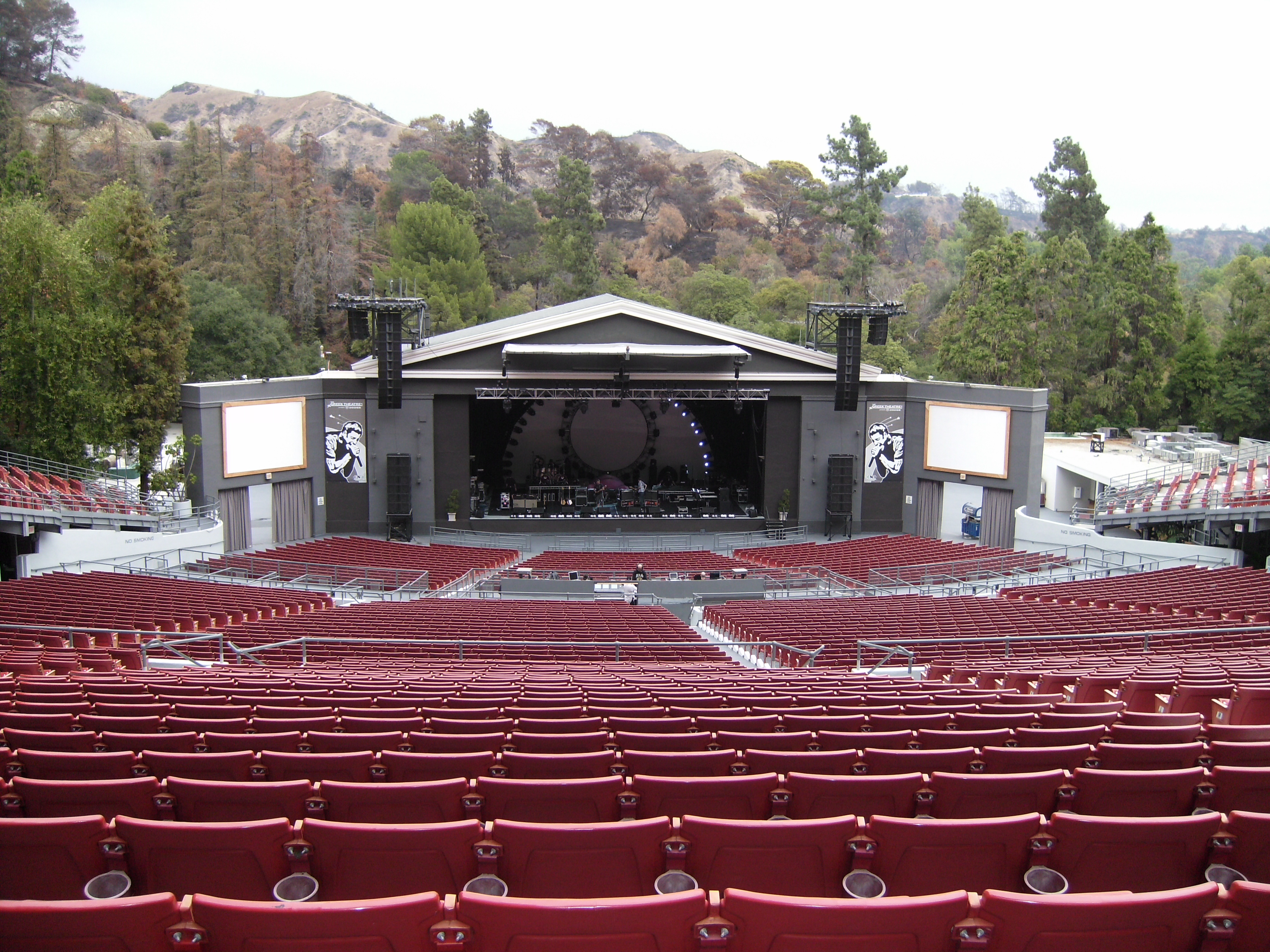
The Festival from India orchestra performed at the Greek Theatre in Los Angeles at the start of the tour.

After the completing the recording, the ensemble undertook a US tour. Among their first engagements, the Festival from India performed at the Greek Theatre in Los Angeles over 24–30 June. Although Shankar lists Aashish Khan as the only sarodya in the ensemble, a report in the Van Nuys News included Khan's father (and Shankar's brother-in-law) Ali Akbar Khan among the performers at the Greek Theatre. The newspaper's reviewer, Stephen Braitman, also wrote that, with the sitar "probably the most familiar [instrument]" to the audience, the orchestra's music "spanned nearly every conceivable combination of sound", and following the inspired interplay between Shankar's sitar and Ali Akbar Khan's sarod, the performers received "a screaming, shouting, standing ovation". The opening concert marked the first time that Shankar and Khan performed together in the US.

The ensemble played at Stanford University's Frost Amphitheater on 5 and 6 July, as part of the university's Summer Festival. The Stanford Daily reported that Shankar had gathered "some of the finest musicians of India for this tour" and gave the total number of players as 22. While detailing the varied program, the newspaper highlighted Ali Akbar Khan's presence, along with that of flautist N. Ramani and veena player Doraiswamy Iyengar. (Note: In an interview for Peter Lavezzoli's 2006 book The Dawn of Indian Music in the West, Shankar said that Collin Wallcott, whom he considered the most promising of his Western students, was also among the performers on the 1968 tour.) Later in the year, the Festival from India played in New York, where their show was reviewed in The New York Times by Narayana Menon, head of All India Radio. Menon praised the energy created by Palghat Raghu and Alla Rakha, on mridangam and tabla, respectively, as the two drummers evoked a musical and cultural exchange between the two disciplines of Indian classical music.

== Release and legacy ==
World Pacific Records released Ravi Shankar's Festival from India in December 1968. Described by Shankar as "a beautiful cover jacket", the album's gatefold cover was designed by Jan Steward. Among other Shankar projects, Steward created the artwork for a book accompanying Anthology of Indian Music, a double LP issued by World Pacific in 1969 containing Shankar's spoken history of Indian classical music.

Reviewing the Festival from India album in December 1968, Billboard magazine said that after his past successes, Shankar was now "test[ing] his own market power with a double disk LP, featuring a festival of haunting, hypnotizing instrumentals". The reviewer added that while the price of the double album might adversely affect its commercial performance, "his influence will only grow." In his Raghu obituary, in 2009, music critic Ken Hunt noted that the Oxford English Dictionary had adopted a quote from the 1968 New York Times review in its definition of "mridangam or mridanga". He also admired Raghu's performance on the studio version of "Raga Mishra Gara" as "a North–South drum meeting with Alla Rakha". Following sitarist Shamim Ahmed's death in 2012, Hunt similarly cited his playing on Shankar's Festival from India – in this case, a duet with Aashish Khan – as a career highlight.

Shankar returned to the Festival from India concept in 1974, when he staged a similarly titled revue sponsored by George Harrison. The latter, whose introduction of Indian influences to the Beatles' sound had led to Shankar achieving mainstream popularity during the late 1960s, said that he had wanted to present such a revue since 1967, after hearing the sitarist's orchestral work Nava Rasa Ranga. (Note: An admirer of Call of the Valley also, Harrison worked with Festival from India musicians Shivkumar Sharma, Aashish Khan and Sharad Kumar on his 1968 solo album Wonderwall Music, recorded partly in Bombay.) Shankar's 1968 studio album was later issued on CD by the specialist reissue label BGO Records.

== Track listing ==
All selections traditional, adapted by Ravi Shankar.

Side one

1. "Vedic Hymn" – 2:38
2. "Raga Yemen in Teental (16 Beats)" – 4:40
3. "Raga Kirwani Alap-Jor-Gat in Teental (16 Beats)" – 12:57

Side two

4. "Raga Ragehwar Jhaptal (10 Beats), Teental (16 Beats)" – 7:45
5. "Raga Puryadhanashree Khyal in Slow Ektal (12 Beats) & Fast Teenal (14 Beats)" – 7:42
6. "Thumri in Manj Khamaj, Talchanghar (14 Beats)" – 4:45

Side three

7. "Thumri in Mishra Khamaj, Tal Keherwa (4 Beats)" – 3:30
8. "Raga Malkauns, Rupaktal (7 Beats)" – 6:06
9. "Raga Vasanta, Tal Rupakam (6 Beats)" – 5:40
10. "Raga Mishra Gara, Teental (16 Beats)" – 7:41

Side four

11. "Dhun, Tala Kaharva (8 Beats)" – 4:25
12. "Sur Das Bhajan Raga Desh in Dadra (3 Beats)" – 4:35
13. "Punjabi Folk Song" – 2:22
14. "Doh Bahar" – 10:50

== Personnel ==
- Ravi Shankar – sitar, direction
- Jitendra Abhisheki – vocal
- Lakshmi Shankar – vocal
- Kamala Chakravarty – vocal
- Shivkumar Sharma – santoor, tabla
- Aashish Khan – sarod
- Alla Rakha – tabla
- Sabri Khan – sarangi
- Palghat Raghu – mridangam
- Sharad Kumar – shehnai
- Shamim Ahmed – sitar
- Miskin Khan – tabla, percussion
- Nodu Mullick – tambura, swarmandel
- Amiyo Das Gupta – tambura
- Fakir Mohammad – tambura
- Taranath Rao – tambura

== Sources ==
- Dimery, Robert, ed. (2010). 1001 Album You Must Hear Before You Die (rev. edn). New York, NY: Universe. ISBN 978-0-7893-2074-2.
- Lavezzoli, Peter (2006). The Dawn of Indian Music in the West. New York, NY: Continuum. ISBN 0-8264-2819-3.
- Shankar, Ravi (2007). My Music, My Life (updated edn). San Rafael, CA: Mandala Publishing. ISBN 978-1-60109-005-8.
- Shankar, Ravi (1999). Raga Mala: The Autobiography of Ravi Shankar. New York, NY: Welcome Rain. ISBN 1-56649-104-5.
- World Music: The Rough Guide (Volume 2: Latin and North America, Caribbean, India, Asia and Pacific) (2000). London: Rough Guides/Penguin. ISBN 1-85828-636-0.
