= Sound of the Sitar =

Studio album by Ravi Shankar
- Released: 1965
- Genre: Hindustani classical music
- Label: World Pacific Records
- Producer: Richard Bock

Ravi Shankar chronology
Portrait of Genius (1964)	Sound of the Sitar (1965)	West Meets East (1967)

Professional ratings
Review scores
Source	Rating
Allmusic	link

Sound of the Sitar is an LP by Hindustani classical musician Ravi Shankar. It was released in 1965 on vinyl. It was later released on CD by BGO Records in 1993 and in a digitally remastered version through Angel Records in 2000.

== Track listing ==
1. "Raga Malkauns (Alap)" – 10:02
2. "Raga Malkauns (Jor)" – 10:46
3. "Tala Sawari" – 7:29
4. "Pahari Dhun (Instrumental)" – 12:30
