= Music of India: Morning and Evening Ragas =

Studio album by Ali Akbar Khan
- Released: 1955
- Recorded: 18 April 1955; MoMA guest house, New York City
- Genre: Hindustani classical
- Length: 47:31
- Label: Angel

Music of India: Morning and Evening Ragas is the debut album by Indian sarod master Ali Akbar Khan, released in 1955. Issued on Angel Records, it is considered a landmark recording, being the first album of Indian classical music ever released.

Khan recorded Music of India on 18 April 1955, while in New York for the Living Arts of India Festival – a cultural program initiated by American classical violinist Yehudi Menuhin and sponsored by the Ford Foundation. The recording session took place at a guest house attached to the Museum of Modern Art, the day before Khan and his accompanying musicians – Chatur Lal (tabla) and Shirish Gor (tambura) – played a well-received concert at the museum. During the same visit, Khan, Lal and dancer Shanta Rao performed live on the CBS Network's arts show Omnibus, marking the first appearance on US television by an Indian classical musician. In another of what music critic Ken Hunt identifies as "three historical firsts" associated with Khan's 1955 visit, his New York and Washington, DC concerts served as debut recitals for Indian classical music in North America.

As president of the Asian Music Circle in London, Menuhin had originally invited sitarist Ravi Shankar to be the main performer at the festival, having met him in India three years before. Shankar was forced to decline the invitation, hoping to save his marriage to musician and teacher Annapurna Devi, but he recommended that Khan, his brother-in-law, go instead. Menuhin subsequently lauded Khan as "an absolute genius, the greatest musician in the world".

The success of Music of India: Morning and Evening Ragas encouraged His Master's Voice to start producing LP-length classical recordings. It also inspired Shankar, who made his concert debut in the West in October 1956 with performances in Britain and Germany, again accompanied by Lal. Also in 1956, having established himself internationally, Khan founded the influential Ali Akbar College of Music in Calcutta. Music of India was reissued in 1995 as disc one of Khan's Grammy-nominated Then and Now album.

In 2025, Uncut ranked Music of India: Morning and Even Ragas at number 426 in their list of "The 500 Greatest Albums of the 1950s", with contributor Jon Dale highlighting the "combination of sarod, tabla and tampura" for remaining "revelatory".

== Content ==
As at the festival events, Menuhin acts as host on the recording, providing a brief introduction for each piece. Author Peter Lavazzoli writes that Menuhin carries out this role "[w]ith distinct enthusiasm" and serves as "the Western listener's guide" on Music of India. Menuhin asks Khan to play the scale to be used in the first raga, and Lal to demonstrate the tala (rhythm pattern) on the tabla, before the musicians perform Sindhu Bhairavi, a popular morning raga.

At the start of side two of the album, in its original LP format, Menuhin again asks Khan and Lal to outline the parameters of the upcoming piece. The musicians then play an evening raga, "Pilu Baroowa".

== Track listing ==
All selections by Ali Akbar Khan.

Side one

1. "Introduction" – 2:07
2. "Raga Sindhu Bhairavi" – 19:50

Side two

3. "Introduction" – 1:02
4. "Raga Pilu Baroowa" – 24:32

== Personnel ==
- Ali Akbar Khan – sarod
- Chatur Lal – tabla
- Shirish Gor – tambura
- Yehudi Menuhin – spoken introductions

== See also ==
- Hindustani music

== Sources ==
- Peter Lavezzoli, The Dawn of Indian Music in the West, Continuum (New York, NY, 2006; ISBN 0-8264-2819-3).
- Reginald Massey, The Music of India, Abhinav Publications (New Delhi, NCT, 1996; ISBN 81-7017-332-9).
- Ravi Shankar, Raga Mala: The Autobiography of Ravi Shankar, Welcome Rain (New York, NY, 1999; ISBN 1-56649-104-5).
- World Music: The Rough Guide (Volume 2: Latin and North America, Caribbean, India, Asia and Pacific), Rough Guides/Penguin (London, 2000; ISBN 1-85828-636-0).
