= India's Master Musician =

Studio album by Ravi Shankar
- Released: March 1959
- Genre: Hindustani classical music
- Length: 50:30
- Labels: World Pacific; WP-1248
- Producer: Richard Bock

Ravi Shankar chronology
| The Sounds of India (1958) | India's Master Musician (1959) | Improvisations (1962) |

Professional ratings
Review scores
| Source | Rating |
|---|---|
| Allmusic | link |
| DownBeat | 5/5 stars |

India's Master Musician is an album by the Hindustani classical musician Ravi Shankar released in March 1959. It was recorded in Hollywood, California. It was later digitally remastered and released in CD format through Angel Records, with digital remastering by Squires Productions.

Supporting musicians are Chatur Lal on tabla and Nodu Mullick on Tamboura.

== Track listing ==
1. "Kafi-Holi (Spring Festival of Colors)" – 7:13
2. "Dhun (Folk Airs)" – 5:53
3. "Mishra Piloo" – 10:37
4. "Raga Puriya Dhanashri" – 11:22
5. "Raga Charu Keshi" – 13:29
