= Kinnara School of Music =

Music school in Maharastra

Coordinates: 34.0735°N 118.3822°W

The Kinnara School of Music was a music school founded in Mumbai, India, in 1962 by Indian classical musician Ravi Shankar. With his increased popularity and influence in the West, he opened a second branch of the school at 8718 West 3rd Street in Los Angeles in May 1967. Shankar's concept for Kinnara was to further the strict guru–shishya tradition of musical education that he had experienced under his teacher, Allauddin Khan, in the 1940s. The Mumbai centre staged productions of orchestral works by Shankar, including Nava Rasa Ranga.

Due to Shankar's busy international schedule of concerts and recording, everyday tuition at Kinnara was delegated to protégés such as Shambhu Das and Amiyo Das Gupta. Among the students at Kinnara was Beatles guitarist George Harrison, who received sitar tuition from Shankar and Shambhu Das in Mumbai in late 1966. During a visit to London that year, Shankar said that, given the widespread fascination for Indian music at the time, he was concerned that "people who don't really understand the sitar will cash in on the sudden interest" by offering newcomers lessons on the instrument. Shankar added that he would consider opening a school in the UK, where his most advanced students could teach, but only if he was sure that the interest there was genuine.

Harrison attracted publicity for the Los Angeles school when he and Shankar gave a press conference there in August 1967, which helped promote Shankar's upcoming concert at the Hollywood Bowl. Other students attending the Los Angeles centre included Robby Krieger and John Densmore of the Doors, and American musicians Russ Titelman and Colin Walcott. Scenes filmed at both the Mumbai and Los Angeles schools over 1967–68 appeared in Howard Worth's 1971 documentary on Shankar, titled Raga.

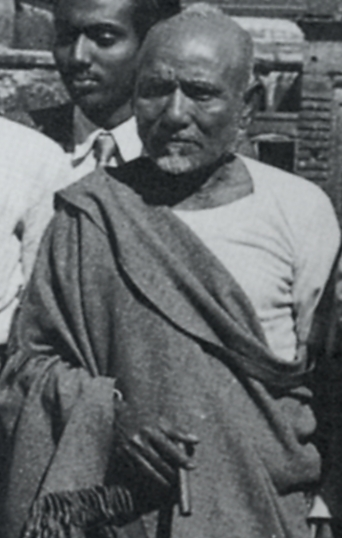
Shankar's teacher, or guru, Allauddin Khan

Shankar viewed the Los Angeles centre as a base from which he could also educate the American public about Indian music. When opening the school there, he emphasised the need to recognise the sacred aspect of Indian classical music, which was defined by Allauddin Khan's phrase "Nada Brahma" ("Sound is God"). He subsequently became disappointed with the impatience and lack of focus displayed by the majority of his Western students. He said that in many cases, as with his concert audiences in the United States, their motives were based on the misconception that Indian music was allied with the hippie movement's espousal of hallucinogenic drugs and free love. Shankar identified Colin Walcott as an exception, calling him "really serious" and "my first American disciple". He also said of Harrison, despite the Beatle eventually relinquishing the sitar: "[Indian music] was not a fad for him, he loved it until the end and became very very dear to me."

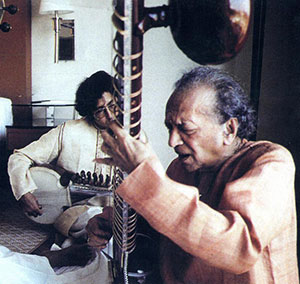
Shankar with one of his students, sarodiya Partho Sarothy, in January 1985

Along with his students and protégés from India, including Das Gupta, Shamim Ahmed and Taranath Rao, Walcott was one of the musicians Shankar selected for his 1968 Festival from India orchestra. Walcott also contributed to Shankar's Raga film soundtrack; titled "Frenzy and Distortion", his piece combined Western and Indian sounds, and evoked the clash of cultures and ideology that Shankar experienced during the height of his popularity in the West. Some of the musicians who participated in the Festival from India project stayed on to teach at Kinnara.

By 1969, Shankar was disillusioned with the Los Angeles school and entrusted its running to Das Gupta. Shankar continued to tutor Western musicians, having previously held temporary positions at the City College of New York and the University of California, Los Angeles, and having been a guest lecturer at other colleges and universities, including the Ali Akbar College of Music. In October 1970, Shankar became chair of the department of Indian music at the California Institute of the Arts. Later, he focused on teaching sitar to his daughter Anoushka Shankar, applying the traditional guru–shishya principles to her musical education. Among other educational projects, he founded the Ravi Shankar Institute of Music and the Performing Arts in New Delhi.

== Sources ==
- Baugess, James S.; DeBolt, Abbe Allen (eds) (2012). Encyclopedia of the Sixties: A Decade of Culture and Counterculture. Santa Barbara, CA: Greenwood Press. ISBN 978-0-313-32944-9.
- Ghosh, Dibyendu (1983). The Great Shankars. Kolkata: Agee Prakashani. OCLC 15483971.
- Kubernik, Harvey (2017). 1967: A Complete Rock Music History of the Summer of Love. New York, NY: Sterling. ISBN 978-1-4549-2052-6.
- Lavezzoli, Peter (2006). The Dawn of Indian Music in the West. New York, NY: Continuum. ISBN 0-8264-2819-3.
- Rough Guides (2000). World Music: The Rough Guide (Volume 2: Latin and North America, Caribbean, India, Asia and Pacific). London: Rough Guides/Penguin. ISBN 1-85828-636-0.
- Shankar, Ravi (2007). My Music, My Life (updated edn). San Rafael, CA: Mandala Publishing. ISBN 978-1-60109-005-8.
- Shankar, Ravi (1999). Raga Mala: The Autobiography of Ravi Shankar. New York, NY: Welcome Rain. ISBN 1-56649-104-5.
