= Dorle Soria =

- Born: 14 December 1900; New York, New York
- Died: 7 July 2002 (aged 101); New York, New York
- Education: Columbia University
- Occupations: Record producer; Talent manager; Journalist
- Organizations: New York Philharmonic; Cetra-Soria Records; Angel Records

Dorle Jarmel Soria (December 14, 1900 – July 7, 2002) was an American publicist, producer of classical music recordings, and journalist. With her husband, Dario Soria, she co-founded Cetra-Soria Records and Angel Records.

== Early career, artists' manager ==
Dorle Jarmel was born in New York City in 1900, a granddaughter of banker Sender Jarmulowsky. A graduate of Columbia University, she worked as a journalist before the concert manager Arthur Judson hired her to manage publicity for his company (which later became the talent management company Columbia Artists Management). She was press manager and publicist of the New York Philharmonic which Judson managed. She played a significant role in establishing the stature of Arturo Toscanini, then the music director, during the orchestra's 1930 European tour. She promoted events such as Leonard Bernstein's 1943 Philharmonic debut and the orchestra's 1951 European tour. In 1942, she married Dario Soria, who had emigrated to the United States from Italy several years earlier.

In 1946, as part of her efforts at promotion at Columbia Artist Management, she co-founded with Nelson Lansdale Artist Life, a magazine intended for managers and other heads of music organizations and agencies. Columbia's board of directors put an end to Artist Life in the fall of 1949, citing 6,000 readers but a deficit of between $6,000 and $7,000. When Boris Morros asked her opinion on which instrumentalist to include in his forthcoming film Carnegie Hall, Soria suggested the cellist Gregor Piatigorsky, not realizing that Morros had been one of Piatigorsky's teachers.

== Record producer ==
In 1948, Dario Soria established the Cetra-Soria label to press and distribute opera recordings from the Italian Cetra label in the United States. Taking advantage of what was available in Italy, the label distributed rarely performed operas in America for the first time. At Soria's insistence, Cetra-Soria releases included both complete Italian librettos and English translations, setting the standard to which fans of recorded opera are now accustomed.

In 1953, the Sorias launched Angel Records, producing and distributing acclaimed classical recordings for EMI, its corporate parent. During her time with Angel records, Dorle Soria used her promotional skills to spotlight their roster of artists. She produced opera balls highlighting Maria Callas at her Lyric Opera of Chicago and Metropolitan Opera debuts. The high quality of the series was noted, with one critic later describing it as "a classy product all the way."

Having produced nearly 500 albums, the Sorias left the company in 1958 after EMI merged it with its American subsidiary, Capitol Records. The Sorias then began producing a "deluxe" series of classical recordings for RCA Victor Red Seal under the title "Soria Series."

Soria received two Grammy nominations in 1963 for Best Album Cover.

In the 1960s, Dorle Soria wrote a weekly column for the Carnegie Hall concert programs. Never entirely abandoning her journalist training, she wrote for the magazines High Fidelity, Opera News, and Musical America for which she wrote a monthly column called "Artist Life" (the same name as her short-lived publication of the 1940s). In 1982 she authored a monograph titled The Metropolitan Opera: A Guide. A producer of the MET's "Historic Opera" series, she received an award in 1986 for her work on issuing the 1939 broadcast of Simon Boccanegra on long playing records.

Dorle Soria died in New York City on July 7, 2002, at the age of 101.

== Popular culture ==
In October 2023, literary press Outpost19 published a biography of Dorle Soria's life, Master Lovers, written by her great-nephew, American writer David Winner. The book was a Publishers Weekly Editors' Pick and chronicles Soria's romantic affairs with British Mandate Palestine governor Bill Barker, Syrian antiquities dealer Georges Asfar, suspected American Nazi John Carter, English conductor and composer Albert Coates, Indian geneticist JBS Haldane, and other men during the 1930s and beyond. The project began after Winner discovered letters between Soria and these men in Soria's Midtown Manhattan apartment after her death.
