= Passages (Ravi Shankar and Philip Glass album) =

1990 chamber music studio album

Studio album by Ravi Shankar and Philip Glass
- Released: 1990
- Genres: Contemporary classical, Hindustani classical, world
- Length: 55:21
- Labels: Private Music, 2074-2-P

Passages is a collaborative chamber music studio album co-composed by Ravi Shankar and Philip Glass, released in 1990 through Private Music. Consisting of arrangements by each of the composers around themes written by the other, the album's content is a hybrid of Hindustani classical music and Glass' distinct American minimal contemporary classical style. The album reached a peak position of number three on Billboard's Top World Music Albums chart.

== Reception ==
Professional ratings
Review scores
Source	Rating
AllMusic	4/5 stars
Pitchfork	7.5/10
Select	4/5 medals

AllMusic's Jim Brenholts called the music "brilliant". Benholts wrote that Shankar's "smooth" style and Glass' dissonant orchestrations mixed well, and recommended Passages to fans of other minimalist composers such as John Cage, Steve Reich and Terry Riley.

== Track listing ==
1. "Offering" (Philip Glass)– 9:47
2. "Sadhanipa" (Ravi Shankar) – 8:37
3. "Channels and Winds" (Philip Glass) – 8:00
4. "Ragas in Minor Scale" (Ravi Shankar) – 7:37
5. "Meetings Along the Edge" (Philip Glass) – 8:11
6. "Prashanti" (Ravi Shankar) – 13:40

== Personnel ==
- Tim Baker – violin
- S. P. Balasubrahmanyam – vocals
- Seymour Barab – cello
- Al Brown – viola
- Ashit Desai – conductor
- Blaise Dupuy – engineer
- Barry Finclair – viola, violin
- Mayuki Fukuhara – violin
- Jeannie Gagné – voices
- Jon Gibson – soprano saxophone
- Philip Glass – performer, producer
- Peter Gordon – French horn
- Regis Iandiorio – violin
- Rory Johnston – executive producer
- Karen Karlsrud – violin
- Abhiman Kaushal – tabla
- Jack Kripl – alto saxophone, flute
- Suresh Lalwani – arranger, conductor, mixing, orchestral assistant, producer
- Regis Landiorio – violin
- Beverly Lauridsen – cello
- Batia Lieberman – cello
- Ronu Mazumdar – flute
- Michael McGrath – assistant engineer
- Kurt Munkacsi – producer
- Keith O'Quinn – trombone
- Richard Peck – alto saxophone, tenor saxophone
- Melanie Penny – art direction
- Martin Perlich – liner notes
- Lenny Pickett – alto saxophone, tenor saxophone
- Alan Raph – trombone
- Michael Riesman – conductor, mixing, piano
- Ebet Roberts – photography
- Partha Sarathy – sarod, veena
- Sergiu Schwartz – violin
- Ron Sell – French horn
- Ravi Shankar – arranger, orchestration, performer, producer, vocals
- Shubho Shankar – sitar
- Richard Sortomme – viola
- T. Srinivasan – drum sounds, mridangam
- A.R. Swaminathan – engineer
- Masako Yanagita – viola, violin
- Frederick Zlotkin – cello

Credits adapted from AllMusic.

== Charts ==
In the United States, Passages reached a peak position of number three on Billboard's Top World Music Albums chart.

Chart (1990)	Peak position
US Top World Music Albums (Billboard)	3

== See also ==
- List of compositions by Philip Glass
- Ravi Shankar discography
