= Portrait of Genius =

Studio album by Ravi Shankar
- Released: 1964
- Recorded: 1964
- Genre: Hindustani classical music
- Length: 39:13
- Label: World Pacific (LP), Angel (CD)

Ravi Shankar chronology
Ragas & Talas (1964)	Portrait of Genius (1964)	Sound of the Sitar (1965)

Professional ratings
Review scores
Source	Rating
Allmusic	4/5 stars

Portrait of Genius is a 1964 LP album by Hindustani classical musician Ravi Shankar. It was digitally remastered and released in CD format by Angel Records in 1998. Matthew Greenwald of Allmusic described the album as "essential for any fan of Shankar or Indian music".

== Track listing ==
=== Side 1 ===
No.	Title	Length
1.	"Tala Rasa Ranga"	2:55
2.	"Dhun"	2:35
3.	"Tabla - Dhwani"	4:48
4.	"Song from the Hills"	3:00
5.	"Tabla - Tabla Tarang"	3:25
6.	"Gat Kirwani"	2:35

=== Side 2 ===
No.	Title	Length
1.	"Raga Multani"	19:50
