= Living Room Music =

1940 composition by John Cage

Living Room Music is a musical composition by John Cage, composed in 1940. It is a quartet for unspecified instruments, all of which may be found in a living room of a typical house, hence the title (Pritchett, 1993, 20).

Living Room Music is dedicated to Cage's then-wife Xenia. The work consists of four movements: "To Begin", "Story", "Melody", and "End". Cage instructs the performers to use any household objects or architectural elements as instruments and gives examples: magazines, cardboard, "largish books", floor, the wooden frame of a window, etc. The first and the last movements are percussion music for said instruments. In the second movement, the performers transform into a speech quartet: the music consists entirely of pieces of Gertrude Stein's short poem "The World Is Round" (1938) spoken or sung. The third movement is optional. It includes a melody played by one of the performers on "any suitable instrument."
