= Improvisations (Ravi Shankar album) =

Studio album by Ravi Shankar
- Released: 1962
- Recorded: 1962
- Genre: Hindustani classical, World fusion, Indo jazz
- Length: 39:42
- Label: World Pacific (LP), Angel (CD)
- Producer: Richard Bock

Ravi Shankar chronology
India's Master Musician (1959)	Improvisations (1962)	India's Most Distinguished Musician In Concert (1962)

Professional ratings
Review scores
Source	Rating
AllMusic	4/5 stars

Improvisations is a 1962 LP album by Ravi Shankar. The opening piece is based on music from Shankar's score for Satyajit Ray's 1955 movie Pather Panchali with flutist Bud Shank playing in Indian style. Shankar composed "Fire Night" influenced by the 1961 Los Angeles fires and the song features jazz musicians Shank (flute) and Gary Peacock (bass) improvising over Indian percussion instruments. There is a clear free jazz influence on tracks like Karnataki (Raga Kirvani). The concluding ragas are in classical Indian style: the first raga, Kirvani, with South Indian origin, and the second, Rageshri, with North Indian origin. The album was released in CD format by Angel Records in 1999 and has been described as a "visionary recording" by AllMusic reviewer Heather Phares.

== Track listing ==
1. "Improvisation on the Theme Music from Pather Panchali" – 7:07
2. "Fire Night" – 4:37
3. "Karnataki (Raga Kirvani)" – 6:43
4. "Raga Rageshri: Part 1 (Alap)" – 6:50
5. "Raga Rageshri: Part 2 (Jor)" – 11:01
6. "Raga Rageshri: Part 3 (Gat)" – 3:24

== Personnel ==
- Ravi Shankar - sitar
- Kanai Dulla - tabla
- Nodu C. Mullick - tampura
- Harihar Rao - tampura and dholak
- Bud Shank - flute

additional musicians on Track 2

- Dennis Budimir - guitar
- Gary Peacock - bass
- Louis Hayes - drums
