= The Sounds of India =

Studio album by Ravi Shankar
- Released: 1957 (LP), 1989 (CD)
- Recorded: 1957
- Genre: Hindustani classical music
- Length: 53:40
- Label: Columbia (CD)
- Producer: George Avakian

Ravi Shankar chronology
| Three Ragas (1956) | The Sounds of India (1957) | Improvisations (1962) |

The Sounds of India is an album by Ravi Shankar which introduces and explains Hindustani classical music to Western audiences. Released by Columbia Records in 1957, it was influenced by Ali Akbar Khan's The Sounds of India, and recorded and produced by George Avakian in 1957 at Columbia's New York studio.

It is regarded today as being of historical interest for showing both Shankar's musical skills and his interest in teaching the West about classical Indian music.

It was digitally remastered and released in CD format by Columbia Records in 1989.

== Recording ==
The album was recorded for Columbia Records in their New York studio in 1957, and produced by Miles Davis's producer George Avakian. It was influenced by and followed the style of Ali Akbar Khan's The Sounds of India album, in which Khan introduces and explains the music he is playing.

== Legacy ==
AllMusic reviewer Adam Greenberg feels that The Genius of Ravi Shankar (1990) is a better choice for listening to Shankar's earlier music, though regards this album as a useful historical document for both "Shankar's amazing abilities" and his love for teaching Western listeners about Hindustani classical music by using short lessons before each performance. Yoshi Kato, in 1001 Albums You Must Hear Before You Die, feels that as Shankar was already familiar to Western audiences, particularly via the interest shown by George Harrison, he was "the perfect musical ambassador", and this album is an "excellent way" into Shankar's music. For Christian Larrède, writing in Music Story, the album "reste une curiosité" (remains a curiosity), and the short lengths of the chosen music along with the spoken introductions "ne souffrent pas de l’entreprise ouvertement pédagogique" (do not [cause the album to] suffer from the obvious educational enterprise).

== Track listing ==
1. "An Introduction to Indian Music" – 4:13
2. "Dádrá" – 10:30
3. "Máru-Bihág" – 11:44
4. "Bhimpalási" – 12:13
5. "Sindhi-Bhairavi" – 15:00

== Personnel ==
- Ravi Shankar – sitar
- Chatur Lal – tabla
- N.C. Mullick – tambura
