= Patricia Angadi =

English novelist and painter (1914–2001)

- Born: Patricia Clare Fell-Clark; 23 September 1914; Hampstead, London, England
- Died: 26 June 2001 (aged 86)
- Known for: Painting
- Style: portraiture

Patricia Clare Angadi (née Fell-Clark; 23 September 1914 – 26 June 2001) was a British portrait painter and novelist, perhaps best remembered for introducing the Beatles to Ravi Shankar.

== Early life ==
She was born Patricia Clare Fell-Clark on 23 September 1914, at 68 Fitzjohns Avenue, Hampstead, in north London, the youngest of four children of Robert Fell-Clark (1872–1948), a paint businessman, and his wife, Hannah Clare Fell-Clark, née Williams (1877–1965). She was educated at Frognal School, Prior's Field School, and a Paris finishing school, followed by Heatherley School of Fine Art, London.

== Career ==
In 1939, at the age of 25, and already enjoying some success as a portrait painter, she was walking along London's Oxford Street when she saw Ayana Deva Angadi (1903–1993), an aspiring Indian writer and Trotskyist intellectual. She said to a friend: "He's gorgeous. I would really love to paint him." A few weeks later, they met by chance at a political rally, and a relationship developed.

On 1 May 1943 at Kensington Register Office, they married, and although her parents refused to attend, her governess "Portie" did. The couple were allowed to live on the top floor of her parents' house in Hampstead.

The Angadis established the Asian Music Circle, and introduced eastern culture to the UK, including yoga, Indian dancing and music, all quite novel at the time. Their visitors included Indian classical musician Ravi Shankar.

In 1953, Angadi became chair of the Hampstead Artists Council. She continued to paint, including portraits of Yehudi Menuhin and her friends Barbara Castle and Fenner Brockway.

In 1965, the Angadis attended a recording session for the Beatles' song "Norwegian Wood", where Patricia sketched John Lennon and George Harrison at work. The following year, she painted a wedding portrait of Harrison and his wife Pattie Boyd, and introduced Harrison, and by extension the Beatles, to Ravi Shankar.

In the 1970s, she was a teacher at Highgate Primary School, in London.

After the suicide of her youngest son Darien in 1981, she found a new direction, and published seven novels, The Governess (1985), which critics compared to the novels of Mary Wesley, followed by The Done Thing (1987), The Highly Flavoured Ladies (1988), Sins Of The Mothers (1989), Playing For Real (1990), Turning The Turtle (1991) and My Mother Said (1992).

== Personal life ==
The couple "separated amicably" in 1970, and her husband returned to India, and she lived in a house in Hampstead's Flask Walk.

Their youngest son Darien Angadi (1949–1981) was a singer and actor, and killed himself in 1981.

== Later life ==
On 26 June 2001, she died at London's Royal Free Hospital, following a stroke. She was survived by three of her four children, Daniel (born 1944), Dominic (born 1946), and Chandrika (born 1953).
