= The Ambient Century =

2000 book by Mark Prendergast

- Author: Mark Prendergast
- Subject: Electronic music
- Publisher: Bloomsbury
- Publication date: 2000
- Pages: 512
- ISBN: 978-1-58234-134-7

The Ambient Century is a 2000 book by Mark Prendergast and published by Bloomsbury that traces the development of ambient music.

== Contents ==
Music journalist Mark Prendergast traces the development of the ambient music genre through vignettes on composers, musicians, and events in music history, beginning with Gustav Mahler.

== Reception ==
Kirkus Reviews described the work as "exceptional" music history and a standard reference work for ambient genre diehards.

== Bibliography ==
- Eberhart, John Mark (January 28, 2001). "Apostles of Ambience". The Kansas City Star. Kansas City, Missouri. pp. I–1, I-7. Also published in "Mahler to Eno, ambient music explored". The Boston Globe. Boston, Massachusetts. February 3, 2001. p. C2.
- Olsen, Eric (April 1, 2001). "Humor would heighten intense look at music". The Plain Dealer. Cleveland, Ohio. pp. 11–I.
- "Rev. of The Ambient Century". Kirkus Reviews. November 15, 2000. ISSN 1948-7428.
- Simon, Jeff (February 25, 2001). "Editor's Choice". The Buffalo News. Buffalo, New York. p. H5.
- Wolk, Douglas (February 4, 2001). "'Ambient' A Disaster Right from the Start". Hartford Courant. Hartford, Connecticut. p. G3.
