= In New York (Ravi Shankar album) =

Studio album by Ravi Shankar
- Released: 1968 (Vinyl); July 18, 2000 (CD)
- Venue: New York City, New York
- Genre: Hindustani classical music
- Label: Angel (CD)

In New York is an album by Hindustani classical musician Ravi Shankar. It was released in 1968 on vinyl. It was later digitally remastered and released in CD format through Angel Records.

== Track listing ==
1. "Raga Bairagi" – 5:37
2. "Nata Bhairavi" – 15:16
3. "Raga Marwa" – 25:12
