= Hem Bihag =

- Similar: Bihag

Hem-Behag is a late night (samay) raga in North Indian classical music that was composed by Ustad Baba Allauddin Khan.

== Origin ==
Hem-Behag has principal roots in a more common raga, Bihag. Hem-Behag or Bihag takes aspects of Raga Hemant. The raga centers around shudha Madhyam (vadi) and Ni (samavadi), but this is variable.

== Structure ==
- Arohana: Ni Sa Ga Ma(shuddh) Pa Ni Sa
- Avarohana: Sa Ni Dha Ma(shudha)Pa Ma Ga Ma Re Sa

Good sources for listening would be:

1. Ali Akbar Khan & Ravi Shankar performing an alaap (introduction) in their live In Concert 1972 album (released 1973 on Apple Records).
2. Nikhil Banerjee
