= Three Ragas =

Studio album by Ravi Shankar
- Released: 1956
- Recorded: 1956
- Genre: Hindustani classical music
- Length: 54:54
- Labels: World Pacific (LP), Angel (CD)

Ravi Shankar chronology
Three Ragas (1956)	The Sounds of India (1958)

Professional ratings
Review scores
Source	Rating
AllMusic	5/5 stars
Music Story	4.5/5 stars

Three Ragas is a 1956 LP album by the Hindustani classical musician Ravi Shankar. It was digitally remastered and released in CD format by Angel Records in 2000. AllMusic reviewer Matthew Greenwald praised the performance of the raga Jog and described the album as an "excellent introduction to the medium of Indian music".

== Track listing ==
1. "Raga Jog" – 28:21
2. "Raga Ahir Bhairav" – 15:36
3. "Raga Simhendra Madhyamam" – 10:57

== Personnel ==
Personnel taken from the 1967 World Pacific Records reissue liner notes:

- Ravi Shankar – sitar
- Chatur Lal – tabla
- Pradjot Sen – tamboura
