= The Living Room Sessions Part 1 =

Studio album by Ravi Shankar
- Released: April 10, 2012
- Recorded: October 2011
- Genre: World
- Length: 52:32
- Label: East Meets West

Ravi Shankar chronology
Symphony (2012)	The Living Room Sessions Part 1 (2012)	The Living Room Sessions Part 2 (2013)

The Living Room Sessions Part 1 is an album by Ravi Shankar released in 2012 through the record label East Meets West. The album earned Shankar the Grammy Award for Best World Music Album.

Accompanying musicians are tabla player Tanmoy Bose, treble tanpura player Kenji Ota, bass tanpura player Barry Phillips and an unidentified tamboura player.

== Track listing ==
1. "Raga Malgunji" – 17:18
2. "Raga Khamaj" – 18:57
3. "Raga Kedara" – 4:47
4. "Raga Satyajit" - 11:30

== See also ==
- The Living Room Sessions Part 2
- Ravi Shankar discography
