= At the Woodstock Festival =

Live album by Ravi Shankar
- Released: 1970
- Recorded: 15 August 1969
- Venue: Max Yasgur's dairy farm, Bethel, NY
- Genre: Indian classical music
- Length: 41:23
- Label: World Pacific
- Producer: Richard Bock

At the Woodstock Festival is a live album by Indian classical musician Ravi Shankar that was released in 1970 on World Pacific Records. It was recorded on 15 August 1969, during the first day of the Woodstock Festival in upstate New York. Shankar's set took place during a downpour and he later expressed his dissatisfaction with the event due to the prevalence of drugs among the crowd.

Having performed at the Monterey Pop Festival in June 1967, Woodstock was the last rock festival Shankar played, as he subsequently distanced himself from the 1960s hippie movement. He said he felt the music was only "incidental" to the party atmosphere and likened the vast rain-soaked crowd to "the water buffaloes you see in India, submerged in the mud".

The album includes an eight-minute tabla solo played by Alla Rakha. At the Woodstock Festival was issued on CD in 1991 by BGO Records.

== Track listing ==
Side one

1. "Raga Puriya–Dhanashri/Gat in Sawarital" (11 Beats) (adapted by Ravi Shankar) – 11:04
2. "Tabla Solo in Jhaptal" (10 Beats 2-3-2-3) (adapted by Alla Rakha) – 8:48

Side two

1. "Raga Manj Khamaj" (Alap, Jor, Dhun in Kaharwa Tal (8 Beats), Medium and Fast Gat in Teental (16 Beats)) (adapted by Shankar) – 21:31

"Raga Puriya–Dhanashri/Gat in Sawarital" was in fact a studio recording. The live version performed at Woodstock was released for the first time in 2009, on the six-CD box set Woodstock 40 Years On: Back to Yasgur's Farm.

== Personnel ==
- Ravi Shankar – sitar
- Alla Rakha – tabla
- Maya Kulkarni – tambura
- Richard Bock – producer
- Eddie Kramer – engineer
