= Shamim Ahmed Khan =

Indian classical music performer (1938-2012)

- Born: Shamim Ahmed Khan; 10 September 1938; Baroda, Gujarat, British India
- Died: 14 February 2012 (aged 73) Mumbai, Maharashtra, India
- Genres: Hindustani classical
- Occupations: Musician, composer
- Instrument: Sitar
- Years active: 1960 – 2012

Shamim Ahmed Khan
- Awards: Sangeet Natak Akademi award in 1994

Shamim Ahmed Khan (10 September 1938 – 14 February 2012) was a sitarist and composer, and notably, a student of Pandit Ravi Shankar of Maihar gharana.

His solo recording debut was at the age of 29. Shamim had performed in Carnegie Hall, at the Lincoln Center, at the Griffith Center, among other concert halls. Although an exponent of Indian classical music, he was also associated with western musicians such as Buddy Rich, and Paul Horn among others.

== Biography ==
Shamim Ahmed was born in Baroda, Gujarat, British India on 10 September 1938. At an early age Shamim Ahmed was introduced to Hindustani classical music by his father, Ustad Ghulam Rasool Khan, a renowned music composer and vocalist of the musical Agra Gharana and his grand uncle Ustad Faiyaz Khan.

However, after a bout of typhoid that resulted in him losing his vocal range, Shamim Ahmed steered away from singing to turn towards his true passion for the sitar. In 1951, while studying at the Baroda Music College (now referred to as the Faculty of Performing Arts at Maharaja Sayajirao University of Baroda, Khan met Pandit Ravi Shankar at a music conference in Ahmedabad. The day was memorable for the young musician also on account of his grand uncle's first death anniversary; grand uncle Ustad Faiyaz Khan was an eminent classical vocalist. His father introduced him to Pandit Ravi Shankar, informing the maestro about his son's interest in music. A few years later, the young Shamim Ahmed once again met Pandit Ravi Shankar at a music competition organized by All India Radio in 1955, where he played the sitar for him.

In later years, Shamim Ahmed characterized his teacher, Ravi Shankar briefly, in three words, "discipline", "devotion", "compassion". Those who knew Ustad Shamim Ahmed Khan, would consider him too as "humble" and "modest". Mourning the death of Shamim Ahmed Khan in 2012, Ravi Shankar reportedly said, "Shamim was a devoted and sincere disciple of mine. I will miss him very much".

In December 1955, Pandit Ravi Shankar had formally invited Ustad Ghulam Rasool along with his son Shamim Ahmed, to visit his home in Delhi. During this visit, Shamim Ahmed was formally enunciated as a student of the maestro, making him one of the early students of Ravi Shankar, at the time. A traditional formal thread ceremony had marked the occasion, binding the two men in a guru-shishya parampara i.e. 'teacher-student' relationship.

In 1958, he was a recipient of the Government of India music scholarship. In 1960, when Pandit Ravi Shankar moved to Mumbai (known as Bombay, at the time), Shamim Ahmed also moved to Mumbai to begin as a teacher at his guru's music institute, Kinnara School of Music. When Panditji moved to California in 1967, it wasn't long, before he invited the young teacher to visit Los Angeles.

In 1967-1968, for the recording of Rich á la Rakha, Shamim Ahmed played the sitar alongside tabla maestro Ustad Alla Rakha, and with renowned jazz drummer Buddy Rich. Shamim Ahmed Khan's US solo recording debut was along with then young Zakir Hussain as tabla accompanist.

== Death ==
Shamim Ahmed Khan died of a sudden heart attack on 14 February 2012 at age 73 in Mumbai, India.

== Awards ==
- Sangeet Natak Akademi award for his contributions to music and sitar playing in 1994.
