= Darien Angadi =

British actor (1949–1981)

Darien Robert Kabir Angadi (19 March 1949 – 5 December 1981) was an English singer and actor.

== Biography ==
Darien Angadi was the son of painter and novelist Patricia Angadi (née Patricia Clare Fell-Clarke), (who introduced George Harrison of the Beatles to Ravi Shankar) and Ayana Deva Angadi, an impecunious Indian writer, intellectual and Trotskyist.

He was born in Stoke Newington, and attended The Haberdashers' Aske's Boys' School where he was a prolific performer in school plays. In 1965 whilst at the school, he was a member of the school team for BBC Television's Television Top of the Form. He achieved some fame as a boy treble, recording Benjamin Britten's Noye's Fludde with the Wandsworth School Boys' Choir, and songs by Schubert and Schumann. He sang with the Finchley Children's Music Group and then the London Boy Singers.

After his voice broke he turned to acting, achieving success on the stage and in television drama productions, including I, Claudius and Blake's 7. From 1968 until 1971 he was a Choral Scholar at Trinity College, Cambridge. He married Irene Lenihan in 1977. He starred in the Horizon episode of the science fiction series Blake's 7.

Angadi hanged himself in 1981. He was 32 years old. His story was told during a BBC Four documentary on the schools' quiz programme Television Top of the Form on 17 April 2006.
