= Nodu Mullick =

Indian sitar maker

Nodu Mullick was a musician and instrument-maker from Calcutta, India. Pandit Ravi Shankar commissioned multiple sitars from him, and they were Shankar's primary performance instrument starting in 1961. Mullick accompanied Shankar on tanpura on his first western concert tour in Europe in 1956, and also on his American tour in 1961.
