= East Meets West Music =

Record label

- Founded: 2010
- Founder: The Ravi Shankar Foundation
- Distributor(s): Harmonia Mundi
- Genre: Classical; World music
- Country of origin: United States
- Location: Encinitas, CA
- Official website: Official web site

East Meets West Music (EMWMusic) is the official recording label of the Ravi Shankar Foundation. The label was launched in 2010, with the first release scheduled for Ravi Shankar's ninetieth birthday on April 7, 2010.

== Catalog ==
- Raga reissue: Released 2010.
- Tenth Decade In Concert: Live in Escondido: Released 2012.
- The Living Room Sessions Part 1: Released 2012.
- The Living Room Sessions Part 2: Released 2013.
- UTSAV Series: Released 2013.
  - Arghyam – The Offering
  - Raga & Raj
