= Angel Records =

American record label

- Parent company: Universal Music Group
- Founded: 1953
- Founder: Dorle Soria; Dario Soria
- Defunct: 2006
- Status: Inactive
- Genre: Classical music Broadway
- Country of origin: U.S.

Angel Records was a record label founded by EMI in 1953. It specialised in classical music, but also included an occasional operetta or Broadway score, and one Peter Sellers comedy disc. The famous Recording Angel trademark was used by the Gramophone Company, EMI and its affiliated companies from 1898. The label has been inactive since 2006, when it dissolved and reassigned its active artists and catalogue while retaining its recent catalogue to sister labels EMI Classics, Virgin Classics and Manhattan Records and its musical theatre artists and catalogue to another sister label, Capitol Records.

== Recording angel ==
A recording angel is a traditional figure that watches over people, marking their actions on a tablet for future judgment. Artist Theodore Birnbaum devised a modified version of this image, depicting a cherub marking grooves into a disc phonograph record with a quill. Beginning in 1898, the Gramophone Company in the United Kingdom used this angel as a trademark on its record labels and players, as did affiliated companies worldwide.

From 1909, Gramophone and related companies began replacing the angel with the famous "His Master's Voice" trademark depicting Nipper the dog listening to a gramophone. The recording angel was retained in countries where the depiction of a dog was deemed offensive, and in North and South America where the His Master's Voice trademark was controlled by RCA Victor.

== Angel Records ==
The Recording Angel as it appeared on early Gramophone discs

In 1953 Gramophone successor EMI lost its U.S. distribution arrangement with Columbia Records, which had elected to make Philips Records distributor of U.S. Columbia recordings outside North America. In response, EMI established Angel Records in New York City under the direction of record producers Dorle Soria (December 14, 1900 – July 7, 2002) and her husband Dario Soria (May 21, 1912 – March 28, 1980). The couple concentrated on distributing EMI classical recordings in the U.S. market. They departed the label in 1957, having already accumulated a catalog of about 500 titles, when EMI merged Angel into its recently acquired Capitol Records subsidiary and moved from imported discs to U.S. production. However, Angel recordings such as Sir Thomas Beecham's 1957 performance of Nikolai Rimsky-Korsakov's Scheherazade, made in England in stereo with the Royal Philharmonic, were still imported to the U.S.

In the 1960s, EMI introduced the budget Seraphim Records label, primarily in the United States, to compete with the low-priced RCA Victrola and Columbia Odyssey labels, which featured historic recordings issued by all three companies. In 1967, as RCA Victrola celebrated the centenary of Arturo Toscanini with the reissue of numerous recordings of the Maestro and the NBC Symphony Orchestra, Seraphim reissued some of Toscanini's EMI British recordings with the BBC Symphony Orchestra, made in London's Queen's Hall from 1937 to 1939; these recordings had formerly been distributed in the U.S. by RCA Victor. Several albums featured Sir Thomas Beecham and the Royal Philharmonic Orchestra, including Beecham's 1959 stereo recordings, which were switched from the Angel label to Seraphim. Some historic EMI recordings have appeared in the U.S. on the Seraphim label on CD in recent years.

Since 1990, international use of the Angel mark has been replaced by the EMI Classics label while it was retained in the U.S.

In 1992, Angel expanded into the musical theatre genre by adding the Angel Broadway imprint.

Angel achieved its first top 10 album on the Billboard 200 chart in 1994 with Chant, an album of Gregorian chants by the Benedictine Monks of Santo Domingo de Silos.

In 2001, Angel released newly remastered and expanded editions of the soundtracks of three Rodgers and Hammerstein films – Oklahoma!, Carousel and The King and I. The LP versions and original CD versions of these soundtracks had previously been released by Capitol Records.

In the mid-2000s the Angel label was used by Parlophone Records in the UK for a number of releases by American acts such as Diana Ross' I Love You album and rapper Mims' single "This Is Why I'm Hot"

The label has been dormant since 2006 when it was placed under the Blue Note Label Group, which dissolving and reassigning Angel Records' active artists and catalogue while retaining its recent catalogue to its sister labels EMI Classics, Virgin Classics and Manhattan Records which their also under the Blue Note Label Group and musical theatre artists and catalogue to its other sister label Capitol Records. EMI Classics and Virgin Classics were sold and absorbed into Warner Classics and Erato Records in 2013.

== See also ==
- List of record labels
